= List of state highways in Louisiana (1050–1099) =

The following is a list of state highways in the U.S. state of Louisiana designated in the 1050–1099 range.

== Louisiana Highway 1050 ==
Louisiana Highway 1050
- Location: Tangipahoa
- Length: 4.966 mi (7.992 km)
- Existed: 1955–present

Louisiana Highway 1050 (LA 1050) runs 4.97 miles (8.00 km) in a north–south direction from LA 440 in Tangipahoa to LA 38 west of Kentwood. The route's mileposts increase from the northern end contrary to common practice.

LA 1050 heads north on Dr. Martin Luther King Drive from LA 440 (Center Street). After exiting the village of Tangipahoa, the highway turns due west at a T-intersection with LA 1051 and crosses over without connecting to I-55. LA 1050 then curves to the northwest and proceeds across LA 1049 to its terminus at LA 38. LA 1050 is an undivided two-lane highway for its entire length.

In the pre-1955 state highway system, the majority of LA 1050 was designated as State Route 1056. However, the portion south of LA 1051 was part of pre-1955 Route 33-D and was the original alignment of both Route 33 and US 51 during the 1920s. LA 1050 was created in the 1955 Louisiana Highway renumbering, and its route has remained the same to the present day.

The entire highway is in Tangipahoa Parish.

Location	mi	km	Destinations	Notes
Tangipahoa	4.966	7.992	LA 440 (Center Street)	Southern terminus
	4.076	6.560	LA 1051 north	Southern terminus of LA 1051
	1.775	2.857	LA 1049	
	0.000	0.000	LA 38 – Kentwood, Clinton	Northern terminus
1.000 mi = 1.609 km; 1.000 km = 0.621 mi

== Louisiana Highway 1051 ==
Louisiana Highway 1051
- Location: Kentwood
- Length: 3.180 mi (5.118 km)
- Existed: 1955–present

Louisiana Highway 1051 (LA 1051) runs 3.18 miles (5.12 km) in a north–south direction from LA 1050 north of Tangipahoa to LA 1049 in Kentwood.

The route heads north from a T-intersection with LA 1050 located 0.4 miles (0.64 km) outside the village of Tangipahoa. It travels between I-55 to the west and US 51 to the east. After 1.8 miles (2.9 km), LA 1051 enters the town of Kentwood, where it becomes known as 9th Street. The highway continues to a junction with LA 1049, located at the intersection of 9th Street and Collis B. Temple Sr. Road. LA 1051 is an undivided two-lane highway for its entire length.

In the pre-1955 state highway system, LA 1051 was part of State Route 33-D and was the original alignment of both Route 33 and US 51 during the 1920s. LA 1051 was created in the 1955 Louisiana Highway renumbering, and its route has remained the same to the present day.

The entire highway is in Tangipahoa Parish.

Location	mi	km	Destinations	Notes
	0.000	0.000	LA 1050	Southern terminus
Kentwood	3.180	5.118	LA 1049 (9th Street, Collis B. Temple Sr. Road)	Northern terminus
1.000 mi = 1.609 km; 1.000 km = 0.621 mi

== Louisiana Highway 1052 ==
Louisiana Highway 1052
- Location: Tangipahoa Parish
- Length: 0.2 mi (320 m)
- Existed: 1955–2000

Louisiana Highway 1052 (LA 1052) ran 0.2 miles (0.32 km), consisting of an access road from US 51 to the Camp Moore Condederate Museum and Cemetery north of Tangipahoa.

The route headed east along Camp Moore Road from a point on US 51 located 0.1 miles (0.16 km) north of the village of Tangipahoa. It immediately crossed the Illinois Central Railroad (now the Canadian National Railway) line at grade then turned north alongside it. After passing the entrance to the Camp Moore Confederate Museum, the route terminated at a dead end next to the cemetery gates. LA 1052 was an undivided two-lane highway for its entire length.

In the pre-1955 state highway system, LA 1052 was designated as State Route C-2219. This replaced Route 406, an older access road to Camp Moore from what is now LA 440 rather than US 51. LA 1052 was created in the 1955 Louisiana Highway renumbering, and its route remained the same until it was returned to local control in 2000.

The entire route was in Tangipahoa Parish.

mi	km	Destinations	Notes
0.0	0.0	US 51 – Tangipahoa, Kentwood	Western terminus
0.2	0.32	Dead end at Camp Moore Confederate Cemetery	Eastern terminus
1.000 mi = 1.609 km; 1.000 km = 0.621 mi

== Louisiana Highway 1053 ==
Louisiana Highway 1053
- Location: Kentwood
- Length: 5.555 mi (8.940 km)
- Existed: 1955–present

Louisiana Highway 1053 (LA 1053) runs 5.56 miles (8.95 km) in a southeast to northwest direction from US 51 in Kentwood to the Mississippi state line west of Osyka.

LA 1053 heads northwest from US 51 (3rd Street) in Kentwood and crosses over without connecting to I-55. After exiting the town limits, LA 1053 curves to the north and proceeds 3.2 miles (5.1 km) to a point on the Mississippi state line at the boundary between Amite and Pike counties. The highway continues as MS 923, a short connector to MS 584 west of Osyka. LA 1053 is an undivided two-lane highway for its entire length.

In the pre-1955 state highway system, LA 1053 was designated as State Route 1057. LA 1053 was created in the 1955 Louisiana Highway renumbering, and its route has remained the same to the present day.

The entire highway is in Tangipahoa Parish.

Location	mi	km	Destinations	Notes
Kentwood	0.000	0.000	US 51 (3rd Street) – Kentwood, McComb	Southern terminus
	5.555	8.940	MS 923 north	Northern terminus; continuation in Mississippi
1.000 mi = 1.609 km; 1.000 km = 0.621 mi

== Louisiana Highway 1054 ==
Louisiana Highway 1054
- Location: Tangipahoa Parish
- Length: 33.267 mi (53.538 km)
- Existed: 1955–present

Louisiana Highway 1054 (LA 1054) runs 33.27 miles (53.54 km) in a general north–south direction from LA 40 east of Independence to US 51 at Greenlaw.

The entire highway is in Tangipahoa Parish.

Location	mi	km	Destinations	Notes
	0.000	0.000	LA 40 – Independence, Loranger	Southern terminus
	6.508	10.474	LA 16 east – Franklinton	South end of LA 16 concurrency
	7.688	12.373	LA 16 west – Amite City	North end of LA 16 concurrency
	11.569	18.619	LA 1061 north	Southern terminus of LA 1061
	13.200	21.243	LA 10 west – Arcola	South end of LA 10 concurrency
	13.560	21.823	LA 10 east – Franklinton	North end of LA 10 concurrency
Chesbrough	17.486	28.141	LA 1058 north	South end of LA 1058 concurrency
Chesbrough	17.586	28.302	LA 1058 south – Arcola	North end of LA 1058 concurrency
	19.392	31.208	LA 440 east – Bolivar	South end of LA 440 concurrency
	20.482	32.963	LA 440 west – Tangipahoa LA 1057 east – Tangipahoa	North end of LA 440 concurrency; western terminus of LA 1057
Spring Creek	24.023	38.661	LA 1061 south	South end of LA 1061 concurrency
	25.049	40.312	LA 38 – Kentwood, Mt. Hermon; LA 1061	North end of LA 1061 concurrency
	29.397	47.310	LA 1055 east	Western terminus of LA 1055
	31.757– 31.808	51.108– 51.190	Bridge over Tangipahoa River	
Greenlaw	33.267	53.538	US 51 – Kentwood, McComb	Northern terminus
1.000 mi = 1.609 km; 1.000 km = 0.621 mi: Concurrency terminus

== Louisiana Highway 1055 ==
Louisiana Highway 1055
- Location: Greenlaw–Mt. Hermon
- Length: 15.661 mi (25.204 km)
- Existed: 1955–present

Louisiana Highway 1055 (LA 1055) runs 15.66 miles (25.20 km) in an east–west direction from LA 1054 east of Greenlaw to LA 438 east of Mt. Hermon.

Parish	Location	mi	km	Destinations	Notes
Tangipahoa		0.000	0.000	LA 1054	Western terminus
Washington		6.557	10.552	LA 450 north	West end of LA 450 concurrency
Washington		7.127	11.470	LA 38 west / LA 450 south – Kentwood	East end of LA 440 concurrency; west end of LA 38 concurrency
Washington	Mt. Hermon	8.426	13.560	LA 438 east – Warnerton	Western terminus of LA 438
Washington	Mt. Hermon	9.157	14.737	LA 38 east – Clifton, Franklinton	East end of LA 38 concurrency
Washington		15.661	25.204	LA 438 – Warnerton, Mt. Hermon	Eastern terminus
1.000 mi = 1.609 km; 1.000 km = 0.621 mi: Concurrency terminus

== Louisiana Highway 1056 ==
Louisiana Highway 1056
- Location: Spring Creek–Richardson
- Length: 13.553 mi (21.811 km)
- Existed: 1955–present

Louisiana Highway 1056 (LA 1056) runs 13.55 miles (21.81 km) in an east–west direction from LA 38 east of Spring Creek to LA 440 at Richardson.

Parish	Location	mi	km	Destinations	Notes
Tangipahoa		0.000	0.000	LA 38 – Kentwood, Mt. Hermon	Western terminus
Washington		4.083	6.571	LA 450 north	West end of LA 450 concurrency
Washington		4.773	7.681	LA 450 south	East end of LA 450 concurrency
Washington	Richardson	13.553	21.811	LA 440 to LA 10 – Franklinton, Wilmer	Eastern terminus
1.000 mi = 1.609 km; 1.000 km = 0.621 mi: Concurrency terminus

== Louisiana Highway 1057 ==
Louisiana Highway 1057
- Location: Tangipahoa Parish
- Length: 10.226 mi (16.457 km)
- Existed: 1955–present

Louisiana Highway 1057 (LA 1057) runs 10.23 miles (16.46 km) in an east–west direction from the junction of LA 440 and LA 1054 east of Tangipahoa to LA 440 east of Bailey.

The entire route is in Tangipahoa Parish.

mi	km	Destinations	Notes
0.000	0.000	LA 440 west – Tangipahoa LA 440 east / LA 1054 – Chesbrough, Spring Creek	Western terminus
4.413	7.102	LA 1061	
10.226	16.457	LA 440	Eastern terminus
1.000 mi = 1.609 km; 1.000 km = 0.621 mi

== Louisiana Highway 1058 ==
Louisiana Highway 1058
- Location: Tangipahoa Parish
- Length: 5.425 mi (8.731 km)
- Existed: 1955–present

Louisiana Highway 1058 (LA 1058) runs 5.43 miles (8.74 km) in a north–south direction from LA 10 northeast of Roseland to LA 440 north of Chesbrough.

The entire highway is in Tangipahoa Parish.

Location	mi	km	Destinations	Notes
	0.000	0.000	LA 10 – Arcola, Franklinton	Southern terminus
	2.133	3.433	LA 1059 west	Eastern terminus of LA 1059
Chesbrough	3.828	6.161	LA 1054 north – Tangipahoa	South end of LA 1054 concurrency
Chesbrough	4.009	6.452	LA 1054 south	North end of LA 1054 concurrency
	5.425	8.731	LA 440 – Bolivar, Tangipahoa	Northern terminus
1.000 mi = 1.609 km; 1.000 km = 0.621 mi: Concurrency terminus

== Louisiana Highway 1059 ==
Louisiana Highway 1059
- Location: Tangipahoa Parish
- Length: 1.326 mi (2.134 km)
- Existed: 1955–2024

Louisiana Highway 1059 (LA 1059) ran 1.33 miles (2.14 km) in an east–west direction from a local road southwest of Chesbrough to LA 1058 south of Chesbrough. By 2024, LA 1059 had been removed from the state highway system and transferred to local control.

== Louisiana Highway 1060 ==
Louisiana Highway 1060
- Location: Tangipahoa Parish
- Length: 2.3 mi (3.7 km)
- Existed: 1955–c. 1957

Louisiana Highway 1060 (LA 1060) ran 2.3 miles (3.7 km) in a southeast to northwest direction from US 51 at Arcola to a dead end at Natalbany Creek northwest of Arcola.

The entire highway was in Tangipahoa Parish.

Location	mi	km	Destinations	Notes
Arcola	0.0	0.0	US 51 – Amite, Kentwood	Southeastern terminus
	2.3	3.7	Dead end at Natalbany Creek	Northwestern terminus
1.000 mi = 1.609 km; 1.000 km = 0.621 mi

== Louisiana Highway 1061 ==
Louisiana Highway 1061
- Location: Tangipahoa Parish
- Length: 17.569 mi (28.275 km)
- Existed: 1955–present

Louisiana Highway 1061 (LA 1061) runs 17.57 miles (28.28 km) in a general north–south direction from LA 1054 east of Roseland to the junction of LA 38 and LA 1054 north of Spring Creek.

The entire highway is in Tangipahoa Parish.

Location	mi	km	Destinations	Notes
	0.000	0.000	LA 1054	Southern terminus
Wilmer	7.660	12.328	LA 10 – Arcola, Franklinton	
Bolivar	12.203	19.639	LA 440 – Chesbrough, Richardson	
	13.847	22.285	LA 1057	
Spring Creek	16.510	26.570	LA 1054 south	South end of LA 1054 concurrency
	17.569	28.275	LA 38 – Kentwood, Mt. Hermon LA 1054 north	Northern terminus; north end of LA 1054 concurrency
1.000 mi = 1.609 km; 1.000 km = 0.621 mi: Concurrency terminus

== Louisiana Highway 1062 ==
Louisiana Highway 1062
- Location: Loranger–Husser
- Length: 6.034 mi (9.711 km)
- Existed: 1955–present

Louisiana Highway 1062 (LA 1062) runs 6.03 miles (9.70 km) in a southwest to northeast direction from LA 40 in Loranger to LA 445 south of Husser.

The entire highway is in Tangipahoa Parish.

Location	mi	km	Destinations	Notes
Loranger	0.000	0.000	LA 40 – Independence, Folsom	Southwestern terminus
	6.034	9.711	LA 445	Northeastern terminus
1.000 mi = 1.609 km; 1.000 km = 0.621 mi

== Louisiana Highway 1063 ==
Louisiana Highway 1063
- Location: Independence
- Length: 6.612 mi (10.641 km)
- Existed: 1955–present

Louisiana Highway 1063 (LA 1063) runs 6.61 miles (10.64 km) in a southwest to northeast direction from LA 442 west of Tickfaw to the junction of US 51 and LA 1065 in Independence.

Parish	Location	mi	km	Destinations	Notes
Livingston–Tangipahoa parish line		0.000	0.000	LA 442	Western terminus
Tangipahoa	Independence	6.612	10.641	US 51 (West Railroad Avenue) – Hammond, Amite LA 1065 south (Tiger Avenue)	Eastern terminus
1.000 mi = 1.609 km; 1.000 km = 0.621 mi

== Louisiana Highway 1064 ==
Louisiana Highway 1064
- Location: Tangipahoa Parish
- Length: 9.271 mi (14.920 km)
- Existed: 1955–present

Louisiana Highway 1064 (LA 1064) runs 9.27 miles (14.92 km) in an east–west direction from LA 43 north of Albany to LA 443 north of Hammond.

The route heads due east from LA 43 and crosses from Livingston Parish into Tangipahoa Parish. After 4.7 miles (7.6 km), LA 1064 crosses over without connecting to I-55. The highway proceeds through the small community of Natalbany, where it intersects US 51 (North Morrison Boulevard) between Hammond and Tickfaw. East of Natalbany, LA 1064 crosses the Canadian National Railway (CN) line at grade and intersects LA 1065 (North Cherry Street). The route proceeds two miles (3.2 km) further to a T-intersection with LA 443 (Morris Road) just north of Hammond Northshore Regional Airport. LA 1064 is an undivided two-lane highway for its entire length.

In the pre-1955 state highway system, LA 1064 was designated as State Route 1079. Upon its creation in the 1955 Louisiana Highway renumbering, LA 1064 also extended northeast concurrent with LA 443 then southeast along River Road, running parallel to the Tangipahoa River to a terminus at US 190 due east of Hammond. This leg of LA 1064 was transferred to local control in 2017 as part of the La DOTD Road Transfer Program.

Parish	Location	mi	km	Destinations	Notes
Livingston		0.000	0.000	LA 43 – Albany, Montpelier	Western terminus
Tangipahoa	Natalbany	6.049	9.735	US 51 (North Morrison Boulevard) – Hammond, Amite	
Tangipahoa		7.323	11.785	LA 1065 (North Cherry Street)	
Tangipahoa		9.271	14.920	LA 443 (Morris Road)	Eastern terminus
1.000 mi = 1.609 km; 1.000 km = 0.621 mi

== Louisiana Highway 1065 ==
Louisiana Highway 1065
- Location: Hammond–Independence
- Length: 10.990 mi (17.687 km)
- Existed: 1955–present

Louisiana Highway 1065 (LA 1065) runs 10.99 miles (17.69 km) in a north–south direction from US 190 in Hammond to the junction of US 51 and LA 1063 in Independence. The entire highway is located within Tangipahoa Parish.

== Louisiana Highway 1066 ==
Louisiana Highway 1066
- Location: Hammond
- Length: 1.7 mi (2.7 km)
- Existed: 1955–c. 1957

Louisiana Highway 1066 (LA 1066) ran 1.7 miles (2.7 km) in a southeast to northwest direction from the junction of US 51/US 190 and LA 36 to a second junction with US 51 in Hammond.

The entire highway was in Hammond, Tangipahoa Parish.

mi	km	Destinations	Notes
0.0	0.0	US 51 / US 190 / LA 36 (West Thomas Street) – Ponchatoula, Covington, Baton Rouge	Southern terminus
1.7	2.7	US 51 – Hammond, Amite	Northern terminus
1.000 mi = 1.609 km; 1.000 km = 0.621 mi

== Louisiana Highway 1067 ==
Louisiana Highway 1067
- Location: Tangipahoa Parish
- Length: 3.5 mi (5.6 km)
- Existed: 1955–2000

Louisiana Highway 1067 (LA 1067) ran 3.5 miles (5.6 km) in a general east–west direction from LA 3158 to US 190 east of Hammond.

The route headed due east on Old Covington Highway from LA 3158 (South Airport Road). After 2.5 miles (4.0 km), it curved north past the Louisiana State University Agricultural Experiment Station at Hammond to its terminus at US 190. LA 1067 was an undivided two-lane highway for its entire length.

LA 1067 originally encompassed all of Old Covington Highway, extending west to US 51 Bus. in Hammond. It was truncated to LA 3158 when that route was added to the state highway system during the 1970s. The remainder of LA 1067 was transferred to local control in 2000. Since then, the four-way stop intersection of Old Covington Highway and LA 3158 has been reconfigured as a roundabout without stop signs.

The entire route was in Tangipahoa Parish.

mi	km	Destinations	Notes
0.0	0.0	LA 3158 (South Airport Road)	Western terminus
3.5	5.6	US 190 – Hammond, Covington	Eastern terminus
1.000 mi = 1.609 km; 1.000 km = 0.621 mi

== Louisiana Highway 1068 ==
Louisiana Highway 1068
- Location: Baton Rouge
- Length: 1.035 mi (1.666 km)
- Existed: 1955–2018

Louisiana Highway 1068 (LA 1068) ran 1.04 miles (1.67 km) in a north–south direction from LA 73 to LA 426 in Baton Rouge.

The southern terminus was located at LA 73 (Jefferson Highway) between the two ramps of a half diamond interchange with I-12 (exit 1B). From there, LA 1068 proceeded northeast on Drusilla Lane to its terminus at LA 426 (Old Hammond Highway). It was an undivided two-lane highway for its entire length.

LA 1068 was deleted in 2018 as part of the La DOTD's Road Transfer program.

The entire highway was in Baton Rouge, East Baton Rouge Parish.

mi	km	Destinations	Notes
0.000– 0.159	0.000– 0.256	LA 73 (Jefferson Highway) to I-12	Southern terminus; eastbound entrance (via LA 73) and westbound exit
1.035	1.666	LA 426 (Old Hammond Highway)	Northern terminus
1.000 mi = 1.609 km; 1.000 km = 0.621 mi: Incomplete access

== Louisiana Highway 1069 ==
Louisiana Highway 1069
- Location: Franklinton
- Length: 0.630 mi (1,014 m)
- Existed: 1955–present

Louisiana Highway 1069 (LA 1069) runs 0.63 miles (1.01 km) in a north–south direction from LA 436 to LA 430 in Franklinton.

The route heads north on 11th Avenue, the continuation of Mott Street, from a four-way intersection where LA 436 turns east from Mott onto Greenlaw Street. After seven blocks, LA 1069 terminates at an intersection with Bene Street, and the roadway continues northward out of Franklinton as part of LA 430. Bene Street is signed as LA 430 Spur west of this intersection to its connection with LA 25 at Main Street. LA 1069 is an undivided two-lane highway for its entire length.

The entire highway is in Franklinton, Washington Parish.

mi	km	Destinations	Notes
0.000	0.000	LA 436 (Mott Street, Greenlaw Street)	Southern terminus
0.630	1.014	LA 430 north LA 430 Spur west (Bene Street)	Northern terminus
1.000 mi = 1.609 km; 1.000 km = 0.621 mi

== Louisiana Highway 1070 ==
Louisiana Highway 1070
- Location: Washington Parish
- Length: 2.851 mi (4.588 km)
- Existed: 1955–present

Louisiana Highway 1070 (LA 1070) runs 2.85 miles (4.59 km) in a north–south direction from LA 424 to LA 438 north of Pine.

The entire route is in Washington Parish.

mi	km	Destinations	Notes
0.000	0.000	LA 424	Southern terminus
2.851	4.588	LA 438	Northern terminus
1.000 mi = 1.609 km; 1.000 km = 0.621 mi

== Louisiana Highway 1071 ==
Louisiana Highway 1071
- Location: Washington Parish
- Length: 5.060 mi (8.143 km)
- Existed: 1955–present

Louisiana Highway 1071 (LA 1071) runs 5.06 miles (8.14 km) in a general northwest to southeast direction from LA 21 in Angie to the junction of two local roads northeast of Varnado.

The entire highway is in Washington Parish.

Location	mi	km	Destinations	Notes
Angie	0.000	0.000	LA 21 – Angie, Varnado	Western terminus
	5.060	8.143	End state maintenance at junction of Jones Creek Road and Highway 1071	Eastern terminus
1.000 mi = 1.609 km; 1.000 km = 0.621 mi

== Louisiana Highway 1072 ==
Louisiana Highway 1072
- Location: Franklinton–Plainview
- Length: 12.913 mi (20.781 km)
- Existed: 1955–present

Louisiana Highway 1072 (LA 1072) runs 12.91 miles (20.78 km) in a northwest to southeast direction from LA 16 south of Franklinton to LA 60 in Plainview.

The route provides access to Franklinton Airport near its western end. LA 1072 is an undivided two-lane highway for its entire length.

The entire highway is in Washington Parish.

Location	mi	km	Destinations	Notes
	0.000	0.000	LA 16 – Franklinton	Western terminus
Plainview	12.913	20.781	LA 60 – Bogalusa, Enon	Eastern terminus
1.000 mi = 1.609 km; 1.000 km = 0.621 mi

== Louisiana Highway 1073 ==
Louisiana Highway 1073
- Location: Washington Parish
- Length: 1.652 mi (2.659 km)
- Existed: 1955–present

Louisiana Highway 1073 (LA 1073) runs 1.65 miles (2.66 km) in a north–south direction from LA 16 to LA 60 east of Enon.

It is an undivided two-lane highway for its entire length.

The entire route is in Washington Parish.

mi	km	Destinations	Notes
0.000	0.000	LA 16 – Enon, Sun	Southern terminus
1.652	2.659	LA 60 – Enon, Bogalusa	Northern terminus
1.000 mi = 1.609 km; 1.000 km = 0.621 mi

== Louisiana Highway 1074 ==
Louisiana Highway 1074
- Location: Washington Parish
- Length: 5.845 mi (9.407 km)
- Existed: 1955–present

Louisiana Highway 1074 (LA 1074) runs 5.85 miles (9.41 km) in an east–west direction from LA 16 west of Sun to LA 1075 in Rio.

It is an undivided two-lane highway for its entire length.

The entire highway is in Washington Parish.

Location	mi	km	Destinations	Notes
	0.000	0.000	LA 16 – Sun, Enon	Western terminus
Rio	5.845	9.407	LA 1075	Eastern terminus
1.000 mi = 1.609 km; 1.000 km = 0.621 mi

== Louisiana Highway 1075 ==
Louisiana Highway 1075
- Location: Washington Parish
- Length: 6.145 mi (9.889 km)
- Existed: 1955–present

Louisiana Highway 1075 (LA 1075) runs 6.15 miles (9.90 km) in a north–south direction through unincorporated Washington Parish from LA 21 north of Sun to the Bogalusa city limit. It is an undivided two-lane highway for its entire length.

LA 1075 splits off from LA 21 north of Sun, a village located just across the St. Tammany Parish line. The route heads north and runs parallel to LA 21 through the small community of Rio, where it intersects LA 1074. LA 1075 proceeds to the Bogalusa city limit where a local road, Avenue F, continues into town toward an intersection with LA 60 (West 10th Street).

The LA 1075 designation originally extended north along Avenue F in Bogalusa to the junction with LA 60, but this portion of the route was transferred to the city of Bogalusa in 2015 as part of La DOTD's Road Transfer Program. The remainder of LA 1075 is proposed to be transferred to Washington Parish in the future.

The entire highway is in Washington Parish.

Location	mi	km	Destinations	Notes
	0.000	0.000	LA 21 – Sun, Bogalusa	Southern terminus
Rio	1.795	2.889	LA 1074 west	Eastern terminus of LA 1074
Bogalusa	6.145	9.889	End state maintenance at Bogalusa city limit	Northern terminus; road continues north as Avenue F
1.000 mi = 1.609 km; 1.000 km = 0.621 mi

== Louisiana Highway 1076 ==
Louisiana Highway 1076
- Location: Bogalusa
- Length: 0.7 mi (1,100 m)
- Existed: 1955–c. 1957

Louisiana Highway 1076 (LA 1076) ran 0.7 miles (1.1 km) in a southeast to northwest direction from LA 21 to LA 10 in Bogalusa.

The entire highway was in Bogalusa, Washington Parish.

mi	km	Destinations	Notes
0.0	0.0	LA 21 (Richmond Street)	Southern terminus
0.7	1.1	LA 10 (Carolina Avenue)	Northern terminus
1.000 mi = 1.609 km; 1.000 km = 0.621 mi

== Louisiana Highway 1077 ==
Louisiana Highway 1077
- Location: St. Tammany Parish
- Length: 20.612 mi (33.172 km)
- Existed: 1955–present

Louisiana Highway 1077 (LA 1077) runs 20.61 miles (33.17 km) in a general north–south direction from a dead end at Lake Pontchartrain in Madisonville to a junction with LA 25 south of Folsom, St. Tammany Parish.

== Louisiana Highway 1078 ==
Louisiana Highway 1078
- Location: St. Tammany Parish
- Length: 5.142 mi (8.275 km)
- Existed: 1955–present

Louisiana Highway 1078 (LA 1078) runs 6.26 miles (10.07 km) in an east–west direction from LA 1077 to LA 25 south of Folsom. Though signed in the field, the concurrency with LA 1077 at its western end is not counted in the official route mileage, resulting in a slightly shorter figure of 5.14 miles (8.27 km).

LA 1078 begins at a T-intersection near the St. Tammany–Tangipahoa parish line that is signed as LA 1077 in all directions. LA 1078 heads northeast concurrent with one branch of LA 1077 for 1.1 miles (1.8 km) then splits off to the southeast at Savannah Road. It continues east along Bennett Bridge Road to its terminus at LA 25 south of Folsom. LA 1078 is an undivided two-lane highway for its entire length.

The entire route is in St. Tammany Parish.

mi	km	Destinations	Notes
		LA 1077 (Turnpike Road)	Western terminus; west end of LA 1077 concurrency
1.120-mile (1.802 km) concurrency with LA 1077 not counted in route mileage
0.000	0.000	LA 1077 north (Savannah Road)	East end of LA 1077 concurrency
5.142	8.275	LA 25 – Folsom, Covington	Eastern terminus
1.000 mi = 1.609 km; 1.000 km = 0.621 mi: Concurrency terminus

== Louisiana Highway 1079 ==
Louisiana Highway 1079
- Location: Tensas Parish
- Length: 1.397 mi (2.248 km)
- Existed: 1955–present

Louisiana Highway 1079 (LA 1079) runs 1.40 miles (2.25 km) in a north–south direction along the east bank of the Tensas River from LA 888 at Westwood, Tensas Parish to a point near the Madison Parish line.

It is an undivided two-lane highway for its entire length.

The entire highway is in Tensas Parish.

Location	mi	km	Destinations	Notes
Westwood	0.000	0.000	LA 888	Southern terminus
	1.397	2.248	End state maintenance near Madison Parish line	Northern terminus
1.000 mi = 1.609 km; 1.000 km = 0.621 mi

== Louisiana Highway 1080 ==
Louisiana Highway 1080
- Location: St. Tammany Parish
- Length: 3.1 mi (5.0 km)
- Existed: 1955–2007

Louisiana Highway 1080 (LA 1080) ran 3.1 miles (5.0 km) in a north–south direction off of LA 40 east of Folsom. It was an undivided two-lane highway for its entire length.

From the south, LA 1080 began at a dead end near the Bogue Falaya River and headed northward along North Factory Road across LA 40. The route transitioned to a local road at a right-angle curve just beyond an intersection with Graci Road.

The entire route was in St. Tammany Parish.

mi	km	Destinations	Notes
0.0	0.0	Dead end at Bogue Falaya River	Southern terminus
1.3	2.1	LA 40 – Folsom	
3.1	5.0	End state maintenance on North Factory Road east of Graci Road	Northern terminus
1.000 mi = 1.609 km; 1.000 km = 0.621 mi

== Louisiana Highway 1081 ==
Louisiana Highway 1081
- Location: St. Tammany Parish
- Length: 5.722 mi (9.209 km)
- Existed: 1955–present

Louisiana Highway 1081 (LA 1081) runs 5.72 miles (9.21 km) in a general north–south direction, looping off of LA 437 (Lee Road) north of Covington.

It is an undivided two-lane highway for its entire length.

The entire route is in St. Tammany Parish.

mi	km	Destinations	Notes
0.000	0.000	LA 437 (Lee Road)	Southern terminus
5.722	9.209	LA 437 (Lee Road)	Northern terminus
1.000 mi = 1.609 km; 1.000 km = 0.621 mi

== Louisiana Highway 1082 ==
Louisiana Highway 1082
- Location: St. Tammany Parish
- Length: 8.321 mi (13.391 km)
- Existed: 1955–present

Louisiana Highway 1082 (LA 1082) runs 8.32 miles (13.39 km) in a north–south direction along Old Military Road from LA 21 northeast of Covington to LA 40 west of Bush.

It is an undivided two-lane highway for its entire length.

The entire route is in St. Tammany Parish.

mi	km	Destinations	Notes
0.000	0.000	LA 21 (Military Road) – Covington, Bogalusa	Southern terminus
8.321	13.391	LA 40 – Bush, Folsom	Northern terminus
1.000 mi = 1.609 km; 1.000 km = 0.621 mi

== Louisiana Highway 1083 ==
Louisiana Highway 1083
- Location: St. Tammany Parish
- Length: 8.300 mi (13.358 km)
- Existed: 1955–present

Louisiana Highway 1083 (LA 1083) runs 8.30 miles (13.36 km) in a north–south direction from the junction of two local roads south of Waldheim to LA 40 west of Bush.

From the south, LA 1083 begins on Allen Road at an intersection with Lowe Davis Road about midway between Abita Springs and Waldheim. The route heads north and intersects LA 21 (Military Road) at Waldheim. After a brief jog eastward onto LA 21, LA 1083 turns again to the north and follows a winding alignment until reaching its terminus at LA 40. LA 1083 is an undivided two-lane highway for its entire length.

The entire highway is in St. Tammany Parish.

Location	mi	km	Destinations	Notes
	0.000	0.000	Begin state maintenance at junction of Allen Road and Lowe Davis Road	Southern terminus
	0.918	1.477	LA 1084 west	Eastern terminus of LA 1084
Waldheim	2.648	4.262	LA 21 south (Military Road) – Covington	South end of LA 21 concurrency
Waldheim	2.868	4.616	LA 21 north (Military Road) – Bogalusa	North end of LA 21 concurrency
	8.300	13.358	LA 40 – Bush, Folsom	Northern terminus
1.000 mi = 1.609 km; 1.000 km = 0.621 mi: Concurrency terminus

== Louisiana Highway 1084 ==
Louisiana Highway 1084
- Location: St. Tammany Parish
- Length: 1.494 mi (2.404 km)
- Existed: 1955–present

Louisiana Highway 1084 (LA 1084) runs 1.49 miles (2.40 km) in an east–west direction from LA 21 northeast of Covington to LA 1083 south of Waldheim.

It is an undivided two-lane highway for its entire length.

The entire route is in St. Tammany Parish.

mi	km	Destinations	Notes
0.000	0.000	LA 21 (Military Road) – Covington, Bogalusa	Western terminus
1.494	2.404	LA 1083	Eastern terminus
1.000 mi = 1.609 km; 1.000 km = 0.621 mi

== Louisiana Highway 1085 ==
Louisiana Highway 1085
- Location: St. Tammany Parish
- Length: 4.409 mi (7.096 km)
- Existed: 1955–present

Louisiana Highway 1085 (LA 1085) runs 4.41 miles (7.10 km) in a southwest to northeast direction from LA 22 west of Madisonville to LA 1077 north of Madisonville. The route is bannered north–south.

LA 1085 initially heads north from LA 22 but then curves eastward, crossing over without connect to I-12. It proceeds a short distance further to a junction with LA 1077 just north of the latter's interchange with I-12. LA 1085 is an undivided two-lane highway for its entire length.

The entire route is in St. Tammany Parish.

mi	km	Destinations	Notes
0.000	0.000	LA 22 – Madisonville, Ponchatoula	Southern terminus
4.409	7.096	LA 1077 to I-12 – Goodbee, Madisonville	Northern terminus
1.000 mi = 1.609 km; 1.000 km = 0.621 mi

== Louisiana Highway 1086 ==
Louisiana Highway 1086
- Location: Covington
- Length: 0.6 mi (970 m)
- Existed: 1955–c. 1957

Louisiana Highway 1086 (LA 1086) ran 0.6 miles (0.97 km) in a general east–west direction, looping off of LA 21 in Covington.

The entire highway was in Covington, St. Tammany Parish.

mi	km	Destinations	Notes
0.0	0.0	LA 21 (South Tyler Street)	Western terminus
0.6	0.97	US 190 / LA 21 (West 21st Avenue)	Eastern terminus
1.000 mi = 1.609 km; 1.000 km = 0.621 mi

== Louisiana Highway 1087 ==
Louisiana Highway 1087
- Location: Mandeville
- Length: 2.3 mi (3.7 km)
- Existed: 1955–2007

Louisiana Highway 1087 (LA 1087) ran 2.3 miles (3.7 km) in a general east–west direction from North Causeway Boulevard to the junction of US 190 and LA 59 in Mandeville.

The route headed southeast on Monroe Street from North Causeway Boulevard. This intersection is located at a point where the East Causeway Approach branches off of that thoroughfare at the north end of the Lake Pontchartrain Causeway bridge across Lake Pontchartrain. After nearly two miles (3.2 km), the route turned northeast onto Girod Street and proceeded four blocks further to a junction with US 190 (Florida Street). Girod Street continues across US 190 as LA 59. LA 1087 was an undivided two-lane highway for its entire length.

The entire highway was in Mandeville, St. Tammany Parish.

mi	km	Destinations	Notes
0.0	0.0	North Causeway Boulevard	Western terminus
2.3	3.7	US 190 (Florida Street) LA 59 north (Girod Street) – Abita Springs	Southern terminus of LA 59; eastern terminus of LA 1087
1.000 mi = 1.609 km; 1.000 km = 0.621 mi

== Louisiana Highway 1088 ==
Louisiana Highway 1088
- Location: St. Tammany Parish
- Length: 9.750 mi (15.691 km)
- Existed: 1955–present

Louisiana Highway 1088 (LA 1088) runs 9.75 miles (15.69 km) in a southwest to northeast direction from LA 59 north of Mandeville to LA 36 west of Hickory. The route is bannered east–west.

It is an undivided two-lane highway for its entire length.

The entire route is in St. Tammany Parish.

mi	km	Destinations	Notes
0.000	0.000	LA 59 to I-12 – Mandeville, Abita Springs	Western terminus
3.097– 3.573	4.984– 5.750	I-12 – Slidell, Hammond	Exit 68 on I-12
9.750	15.691	LA 36 – Hickory, Abita Springs	Eastern terminus
1.000 mi = 1.609 km; 1.000 km = 0.621 mi

== Louisiana Highway 1089 ==
Louisiana Highway 1089
- Location: St. Tammany Parish
- Length: 1.5 mi (2.4 km)
- Existed: 1955–2008

Louisiana Highway 1089 (LA 1089) ran 1.5 miles (2.4 km) in a southwest to northeast direction through Fontainebleau State Park east of Mandeville. It extended from a point near the shore of Lake Pontchartrain to the park entrance on US 190.

LA 1089 was an undivided two-lane highway for its entire length and was not signed in the field.

The entire highway was in Fontainebleau State Park, St. Tammany Parish.

mi	km	Destinations	Notes
0.0	0.0	Begin state maintenance near Lake Pontchartrain	Southern terminus
1.5	2.4	US 190 – Mandeville, Slidell	Northern terminus
1.000 mi = 1.609 km; 1.000 km = 0.621 mi

== Louisiana Highway 1090 ==
Louisiana Highway 1090
- Location: St. Tammany Parish
- Length: 4.520 mi (7.274 km)
- Existed: 1955–present

Louisiana Highway 1090 (LA 1090) runs 4.52 miles (7.27 km) in a north–south direction from US 190 east of Slidell to the junction of I-59 and US 11 south of Pearl River. The route's mileposts increase from the northern end contrary to common practice.

The route heads north on Military Road from a T-intersection with US 190 at Gause Boulevard. It passes over without connecting to I-10 and parallels I-59 northward toward Pearl River. LA 1090 ends at a diamond interchange where US 11 joins the alignment of I-59 at exit 3. LA 1090 is an undivided two-lane highway for its entire length.

The entire route is in St. Tammany Parish.

mi	km	Destinations	Notes
4.520	7.274	US 190 (Gause Boulevard East, South Military Road) to I-10	Southern terminus
0.000	0.000	I-59 / US 11 north – New Orleans, Hattiesburg US 11 south (Concord Boulevard) – Pearl River	Northern terminus; exit 3 on I-59/US 11
1.000 mi = 1.609 km; 1.000 km = 0.621 mi

== Louisiana Highway 1091 ==
Louisiana Highway 1091
- Location: Slidell
- Length: 5.151 mi (8.290 km)
- Existed: 1955–present

Louisiana Highway 1091 (LA 1091) runs 5.15 miles (8.29 km) in a north–south direction from US 190 in Slidell to US 11 south of Pearl River.

LA 1091 heads northward from US 190 (Gause Boulevard) on Robert Boulevard, an undivided four-lane thoroughfare with a center turning lane. On the way out of Slidell, the roadway narrows to two lanes, and LA 1091 crosses over without connecting to I-12. The route continues north, traveling between I-59 and US 11 until reaching a T-intersection with the latter at the St. Joe Brick Works south of Pearl River.

The entire highway is in St. Tammany Parish.

Location	mi	km	Destinations	Notes
Slidell	0.000	0.000	US 190 (Gause Boulevard) to I-10	Southern terminus
	5.151	8.290	US 11 – Pearl River, Slidell	Northern terminus
1.000 mi = 1.609 km; 1.000 km = 0.621 mi

== Louisiana Highway 1092 ==
Louisiana Highway 1092
- Location: Slidell
- Length: 3.7 mi (6.0 km)
- Existed: 1955–1971

Louisiana Highway 1092 (LA 1092) ran 3.7 miles (6.0 km) in an east–west direction from the concurrent US 11/US 190 in Slidell to a junction with LA 1090 east of town. The route is now part of US 190.

The entire highway was in St. Tammany Parish.

Location	mi	km	Destinations	Notes
Slidell	0.0	0.0	US 11 / US 190 (Front Street)	Western terminus
Slidell	0.5	0.80	LA 1091 north (Robert Road)	Southern terminus of LA 1091
	3.7	6.0	LA 1090 (Military Road)	Eastern terminus
1.000 mi = 1.609 km; 1.000 km = 0.621 mi

== Louisiana Highway 1093 ==
Louisiana Highway 1093
- Location: Lacombe
- Length: 1.320 mi (2.124 km)
- Existed: 1955–present

Louisiana Highway 1093 (LA 1093) consists of two road segments with a total length of 1.32 miles (2.12 km) that are located in the St. Tammany Parish community of Lacombe. A third segment was deleted from the state highway system in 1987.

- LA 1093-1 runs 0.83 miles (1.34 km) along Davis Avenue from the junction of US 190 and LA 434 to an intersection with Jackson Street.
- LA 1093-2 ran 0.25 miles (0.40 km) along North 14th Street from US 190 to LA 1093-1.
- LA 1093-3 runs 0.50 miles (0.80 km) along North 18th, Beulah, and Jefferson Streets from US 190 to LA 1093-1.

== Louisiana Highway 1094 ==
Louisiana Highway 1094
- Location: Tensas Parish
- Length: 2.5 mi (4.0 km)
- Existed: 1955–c. 1957

Louisiana Highway 1094 (LA 1094) ran 2.5 miles (4.0 km) in a southeast to northwest direction from LA 573 at Mayflower to the junction of two local roads northwest of Mayflower.

The entire highway was in Tensas Parish.

Location	mi	km	Destinations	Notes
Mayflower	0.0	0.0	LA 573	Southern terminus
	2.5	4.0	End state maintenance at junction of Crooked Bayou Road and Doc Case Road	Northern terminus
1.000 mi = 1.609 km; 1.000 km = 0.621 mi

== Louisiana Highway 1095 ==
Louisiana Highway 1095
- Location: Rayne
- Length: 1.1 mi (1.8 km)
- Existed: 1955–1962

Louisiana Highway 1095 (LA 1095) ran 1.1 miles (1.8 km) in a north–south direction from LA 722 east of Rayne to LA 98 northeast of Rayne. The route is now part of LA 98.

The entire route was in Acadia Parish.

mi	km	Destinations	Notes
0.0	0.0	LA 722	Southern terminus
1.1	1.8	LA 98 – Rayne, Castille	Northern terminus
1.000 mi = 1.609 km; 1.000 km = 0.621 mi

== Louisiana Highway 1096 ==
Louisiana Highway 1096
- Location: Duson
- Length: 3.629 mi (5.840 km)
- Existed: 1955–present

Louisiana Highway 1096 (LA 1096) runs 3.63 miles (5.84 km) in a loop off of LA 95 from Duson, Lafayette to a point in Acadia Parish north of Duson.

Parish	Location	mi	km	Destinations	Notes
Lafayette	Duson	0.000	0.000	LA 95 (Austria Road) – Duson, Mire	Southern terminus
Acadia		3.629	5.840	LA 95 (Mire Highway) – Duson, Mire	Northern terminus
1.000 mi = 1.609 km; 1.000 km = 0.621 mi

== Louisiana Highway 1097 ==
Louisiana Highway 1097
- Location: Acadia Parish
- Length: 2.232 mi (3.592 km)
- Existed: 1955–present

Louisiana Highway 1097 (LA 1097) runs 2.23 miles (3.59 km) in an east–west direction along Heritage Road from LA 98 at Arceneaux to LA 95 south of Mire.

The entire highway is in Acadia Parish.

Location	mi	km	Destinations	Notes
Arceneaux	0.000	0.000	LA 98 (Grand Prairie Highway) – Castille, Rayne	Western terminus
	2.232	3.592	LA 95 (Mire Highway) – Mire, Duson	Eastern terminus
1.000 mi = 1.609 km; 1.000 km = 0.621 mi

== Louisiana Highway 1098 ==
Louisiana Highway 1098
- Location: Acadia Parish
- Length: 2.742 mi (4.413 km)
- Existed: 1955–present

Louisiana Highway 1098 (LA 1098) runs 2.74 miles (4.41 km) in a general southwest to northeast direction from LA 95 north of Mire to LA 365 east of Higginbotham.

The entire route is in Acadia Parish.

mi	km	Destinations	Notes
0.000	0.000	LA 95 (Mire Highway) – Mire, Church Point	Southern terminus
2.012	3.238	LA 1099 (Kayla Lane)	Western terminus of LA 1099
2.742	4.413	LA 365 (Mary Alice Drive)	Northern terminus
1.000 mi = 1.609 km; 1.000 km = 0.621 mi

== Louisiana Highway 1099 ==
Louisiana Highway 1099
- Location: Acadia Parish
- Length: 0.775 mi (1,247 m)
- Existed: 1955–present

Louisiana Highway 1099 (LA 1099) runs 0.78 miles (1.26 km) in an east–west direction along Kayla Lane from LA 1098 to LA 365 southeast of Higginbotham.

Parish	Location	mi	km	Destinations	Notes
Acadia		0.000	0.000	LA 1098 (Willow Cove Road)	Western terminus
Acadia–St. Landry parish line		0.775	1.247	LA 365 (Osage Trail)	Eastern terminus
1.000 mi = 1.609 km; 1.000 km = 0.621 mi
