= Louisiana Highway 40 =

State highway in Louisiana, United States

Louisiana Highway 40

- Route of LA 40 highlighted in red

Route information
- Maintained by Louisiana DOTD
- Length: 53.108 mi (85.469 km)
- Existed: 1955 renumbering–present

Major junctions
- West end: LA 43 south of Montpelier
- I-55 west of Independence; US 51 in Independence; LA 25 in Folsom; LA 21 in Bush
- East end: LA 41 in Bush

Location
- Country: United States
- State: Louisiana
- Parishes: Livingston, Tangipahoa, St. Tammany

Highway system
- Louisiana State Highway System; Interstate; US; State; Scenic
← LA 39	→ LA 41

Louisiana Highway 40 (LA 40) is a state highway located in southeastern Louisiana. It runs 53.11 miles (85.47 km) in an east–west direction from LA 43 south of Montpelier to LA 41 in Bush.

The route travels through the rural area between the parallel corridors of U.S. Highway 190 (US 190) and LA 21 to the south and LA 16 to the north. It connects several small population centers in Tangipahoa and St. Tammany parishes. These include the town of Independence, the village of Folsom, and the unincorporated communities of Loranger and Bush. LA 40 also connects Independence with Interstate 55 (I-55), the area's primary route to the New Orleans area. Further east, the highway provides access to the Global Wildlife Center, a popular wildlife and game preserve located west of Folsom.

LA 40 was designated in the 1955 Louisiana Highway renumbering from portions of several former routes, primarily State Route 408, State Route 1080, and State Route 189. Two portions of LA 40 are scheduled to be eliminated from the state highway system in the future as part of the Louisiana Department of Transportation and Development (La DOTD) Road Transfer Program.

== Route description ==
=== Livingston Parish to Folsom ===
From the west, LA 40 begins at a junction with LA 43 between Montpelier and Albany in the northeast corner of Livingston. The highway crosses into Tangipahoa Parish after a short distance and passes through an interchange with I-55 (exit 40) just west of Independence. I-55 connects with Hammond, Louisiana to the south and Jackson, Mississippi to the north. LA 40 heads into town and follows West 3rd Street to a junction with US 51 (West Railroad Avenue), which serves local traffic along the I-55 corridor.

Immediately after crossing US 51, LA 40 crosses the Canadian National Railway (CN) line at grade and zigzags south and east out of Independence. The highway then crosses a bridge over the Tangipahoa River and intersects LA 1054. In the community of Loranger, LA 40 turns south at a junction with LA 1062. Over the next 12 miles (19 km), the highway zigzags along section line roads but maintains a general eastward trajectory. During this stretch are intersections with minor rural routes, such as LA 442, LA 443, and LA 445, which connect to more populated areas along US 51 and US 190. Traveling through an area known as Uneedus, LA 40 passes the entrance to the Global Wildlife Center, a non-profit wildlife preserve open to the public.

=== Folsom to Bush ===
LA 40 crosses the Tchefuncte River into St. Tammany Parish and proceeds into the village of Folsom. The highway follows Garfield Street to a junction with LA 25 (Orange Street) in the center of town, connecting with the cities of Covington and Franklinton. LA 40 zigzags north onto LA 25 for two blocks before turning east onto Cleveland Street to exit the village. The highway then follows a more winding path for the remainder of its journey.

Heading southeast from Folsom, LA 40 begins a concurrency with LA 437 that ends when the latter turns south onto Lee Road in a populated rural area north of Covington. LA 40 makes a zigzag past Lee Road Junior High School then turns northeast for about five miles (8.0 km). Resuming its eastward course, LA 40 intersects two minor rural routes, LA 1082 and LA 1083. Near the end of its route, the highway makes a final zigzag via LA 21 in the unincorporated community of Bush. It then continues a short distance further to a T-intersection with LA 41, which turns north onto a divided-four lane alignment heading toward the city of Bogalusa.

=== Route classification and data ===
LA 40 is classified by the Louisiana Department of Transportation and Development (La DOTD) as a rural major collector west of Lee Road (LA 437 south) and as a rural minor collector between Lee Road and Bush. Daily traffic volume in 2013 peaked at 11,700 vehicles in Folsom and 8,200 vehicles between I-55 and Independence. The lowest figure was reported near the eastern terminus in Bush with an average of 1,460 vehicles daily. The posted speed limit is generally 55 mph (90 km/h) in rural areas, reduced as low as 35 mph (55 km/h) through town. LA 40 is an undivided two-lane highway for its entire length.

== History ==
In the original Louisiana Highway system in use between 1921 and 1955, the modern LA 40 was part of several different routes, primarily State Route 408 from the western terminus to Loranger; State Route 1080 from Loranger to the Tangipahoa–St. Tammany parish line; and State Route 189 from the parish line to Bush. All three routes were added to the state highway system between 1928 and 1930. The portion of LA 40 running one mile (1.6 km) south from Loranger was technically part of State Route 229, which was supposed to turn east across Chappapella Creek but was never completed. The next mile was taken into the system later as State Route C-2021. This provided a connection to Route 1080, which did exist, and completed a state-maintained route between Loranger and Tickfaw. Finally, the easternmost mile of LA 40 was actually a spur of State Route 484 created when State Route 7 (the modern LA 21) was straightened through Bush.

LA 40 was created in the 1955 Louisiana Highway renumbering, giving a single route number to the east–west corridor in Tangipahoa and St. Tammany parishes between LA 16 and US 190/LA 21.

Class "B": La 40—From a junction with La 43 at or near Georgeville through or near Independence and Loranger to a junction with La 25 at or near Folsom.
Class "C": La 40—From a junction with La 25 at or near Folsom through or near Blond and Pilgrims Rest to a junction with La 21 west of Bush and from a junction with La 21 to a junction with La 41 at or near Bush.

— 1955 legislative route description

With the 1955 renumbering, the state highway department initially categorized all routes into three classes: "A" (primary), "B" (secondary), and "C" (farm-to-market). This system has since been updated and replaced by a more specific functional classification system.

The route has seen only minor changes over the years. A small realignment occurred to accommodate the construction of the I-55 interchange west of Independence in 1969. The original path of LA 40 here exists as two dead-end local roads on either side of the interstate called Fontana Lane and Old Highway 40. Another realignment shifted the highway's zigzag in Folsom east two blocks, creating the concurrency with LA 25. Originally, LA 40 turned north from Garfield Street onto Olive Street, then followed Cleveland Street straight across LA 25.

== Future ==
La DOTD is currently engaged in a program that aims to transfer about 5,000 miles (8,000 km) of state-owned roadways to local governments over the next several years. Under this plan of "right-sizing" the state highway system, two portions of LA 40 are proposed for deletion as they no longer meet a significant interurban travel function. These include the portion from I-55 west of Independence to the junction with LA 442/LA 443 south of Loranger and the easternmost portion of the route between LA 21 and LA 41 in Bush.

== Major intersections ==
Parish	Location	mi	km	Destinations	Notes
Livingston		0.000	0.000	LA 43 – Montpelier, Albany	Western terminus
Tangipahoa		5.477– 5.938	8.814– 9.556	I-55 – Hammond, Jackson	Exit 40 on I-55
Tangipahoa	Independence	7.204	11.594	US 51 (West Railroad Avenue) – Hammond, Amite City	
Tangipahoa		8.513– 8.629	13.700– 13.887	Bridge over Tangipahoa River	
Tangipahoa		9.143	14.714	LA 1054 north	Southern terminus of LA 1054
Tangipahoa	Loranger	13.822	22.244	LA 1062 north – Husser	Western terminus of LA 1062
Tangipahoa		15.731	25.317	LA 442 west – Tickfaw LA 443 south – Hammond	Eastern terminus of LA 442; northern terminus of LA 443
Tangipahoa		20.816	33.500	LA 445 south – Robert	West end of LA 445 concurrency
Tangipahoa		21.806	35.093	LA 445 north – Husser	East end of LA 445 concurrency
Tangipahoa–St. Tammany parish line		25.742– 25.806	41.428– 41.531	Bridge over Tchefuncte River	
St. Tammany	Folsom	29.954	48.206	LA 25 south (Orange Street) – Covington	West end of LA 25 concurrency
St. Tammany	Folsom	30.094	48.432	LA 25 north (Orange Street) – Franklinton	East end of LA 25 concurrency
St. Tammany		34.751– 34.811	55.926– 56.023	LA 437 north (Middle Road) – Enon	West end of LA 437 concurrency
St. Tammany		38.298	61.635	LA 437 south (Lee Road) – Covington	East end of LA 437 concurrency
St. Tammany		38.670	62.233	LA 1129 north (Lee Road)	Southern terminus of LA 1129
St. Tammany		44.928	72.305	LA 1082 south (Old Military Road)	Northern terminus of LA 1082
St. Tammany		46.685	75.132	LA 1083 south (Ben Williams Road)	Northern terminus of LA 1083
St. Tammany	Bush	51.571	82.995	LA 21 south – Covington	West end of LA 21 concurrency
St. Tammany	Bush	52.071	83.800	LA 21 north – Bogalusa	East end of LA 21 concurrency
St. Tammany	Bush	53.108	85.469	LA 41 – Bogalusa, Pearl River	Eastern terminus
1.000 mi = 1.609 km; 1.000 km = 0.621 mi: Concurrency terminus
