= Ponchatoula Creek =

Main waterway that flows through Hammond

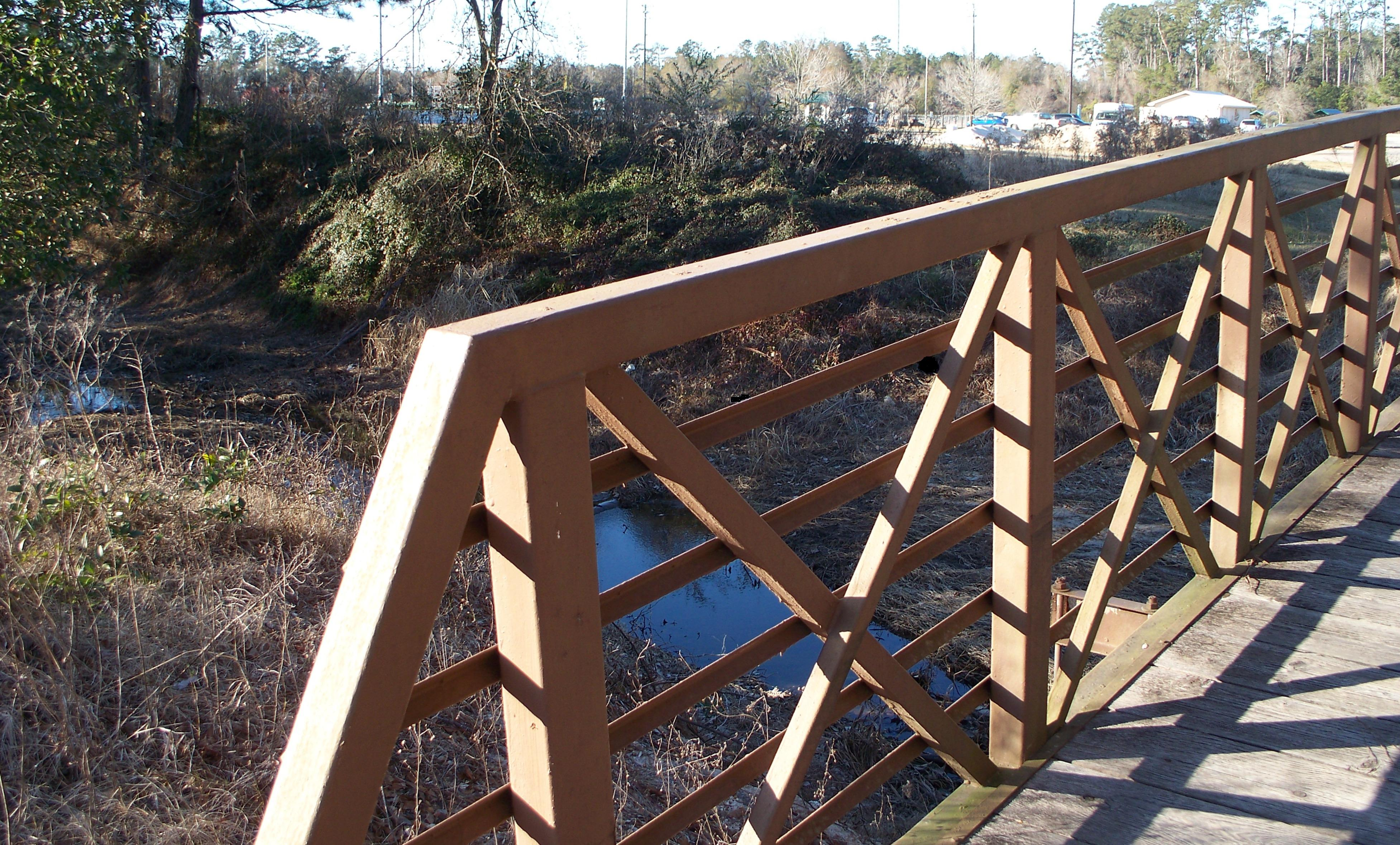
- Ponchatoula Creek tributary crossed by a footbridge on the Southeastern Louisiana University campus. Background: North Oak Street Park recreational area. The view is toward the north from the Southeastern Oaks student residential complex adjacent to the University Center.

Location
- Country: United States
- State: Louisiana
- Parish: Tangipahoa

Physical characteristics
- Source
  - location: Independence, Louisiana
  - coordinates: 30°39′40″N 90°30′43″W
- Mouth: Natalbany River
  - coordinates: 30°23′24″N 90°30′14″W
- Length: 26.1 miles (42.0 km)

Basin features
- Cities: Independence; Hammond; Ponchatoula

Ponchatoula Creek is a 26.1-mile-long (42.0 km) tributary of the Natalbany River in Tangipahoa Parish, Louisiana. The two waterways join where a section of the Natalbany forms the boundary between Tangipahoa Parish and Livingston Parish. Ponchatoula Creek originates west of Old US Highway 51, 1 mile (1.6 km) north of Independence. The creek is entirely within Tangipahoa Parish.

== Path ==
Ponchatoula Creek's cardinal direction is southwest (or south and west) as it meanders south around the west side of Independence and Tickfaw, and even southeast through Natalbany and the northeastern quadrant of Hammond, thence westward between Hammond and the city of Ponchatoula, and then south and west to join the Natalbany River between Springfield and Lake Maurepas.

Ponchatoula Creek is bridged by LA 40, LA 1063, LA 442, US 51, LA 1064 (Natalbany Road), North Oak Street, Canadian National Railway, LA 3234 (University Avenue), LA 1065 (North Cherry Street), US 190, US 51 Business, I-55 (in its concurrency with US 51), and LA 22 before emptying into the Natalbany River southwest of Ponchatoula. One tributary forms part of the northern perimeter of Southeastern Louisiana University's main campus, and another tributary flows under the campus in a tunnel starting on the south side of LA 3234 near the Southeastern University Center.

== Role ==
Native Americans found Ponchatoula Creek an earthly happy hunting ground, as even in the 21st century arrowheads are still occasionally found along the historic creek bed, a sign that deer frequented the stream.

Peter av Hammerdal (Peter Hammond), eponym of Hammond, Louisiana, settled along the Ponchatoula Creek in the early 19th century and used the stream for agricultural and logistical purposes as he supplied wood products to ocean-going vessels in New Orleans.

In modern times the chief use of Ponchatoula Creek is drainage, with much of its channel widened, deepened, and straightened by dredging. These practical enhancements to Ponchatoula Creek have reduced its scenic quality but greatly improved its efficiency and effectiveness in eliminating flooding. The tunnel under Southeastern's campus is throughout taller than the average man.

Ponchatoula Creek is eponymous with Ponchatoula, Louisiana, USS Ponchatoula (AOG 38), USS Ponchatoula (AO 148), and Ponchatoula High School. For etymology of the name "Ponchatoula" see Ponchatoula history.

== Fauna ==
Ponchatoula Creek forms a habitat for the introduced species Ctenopharyngodon idella, a grass carp fish also known as white amur, which was imported to the US in 1963 from Taiwan and Malaysia, and is often stocked to control vegetation.
