= Louisiana Highway 16 =

Highway in Louisiana

Louisiana Highway 16
- Route of LA 16 highlighted in red

Route information
- Maintained by Louisiana DOTD
- Length: 110.272 mi (177.466 km)
- Existed: 1955 renumbering–present

Major junctions
- West end: LA 22 south of French Settlement
- LA 42 in French Settlement / Port Vincent; US 190 in Denham Springs; LA 64 north of Denham Springs; LA 63 at Weiss; LA 43 in Montpelier; I-55 in Amite City; US 51 in Amite City; LA 10 / LA 25 in Franklinton; LA 60 at Enon
- East end: LA 21 in Sun

Location
- Country: United States
- State: Louisiana
- Parishes: Livingston, St. Helena, Tangipahoa, Washington, St. Tammany

Highway system
- Louisiana State Highway System; Interstate; US; State; Scenic
← LA 15	→ LA 17

Louisiana Highway 16 (LA 16) is a state highway located in southeastern Louisiana. It runs 110.27 miles (177.46 km) in a general east–west direction from LA 22 south of French Settlement to LA 21 in Sun.

The route makes a wide arc through the Florida Parishes region of the state, traveling east of Baton Rouge and avoiding the urban centers of Hammond and Covington. However, it passes through a number of the area's smaller towns and communities, such as Denham Springs, Montpelier, Amite City, and Franklinton. Some but not all of the signage south of Watson still bears north–south directionals rather than the standard east–west. Major junctions along the route include U.S. Highway 190 (US 190) in Denham Springs and Interstate 55 (I-55) in Amite City.

LA 16 was designated in the 1955 Louisiana Highway renumbering, stitched together from six shorter former routes, including State Route 131 south of Denham Springs; State Route 103 between Watson and Amite City; and State Route 35 between Amite City and Franklinton.

== Route description ==
From the west, LA 16 begins at a roundabout with LA 22 just west of Head of Island near the southern tip of Livingston Parish. After crossing the Amite River, the highway parallels the east bank of the river through the adjacent communities of French Settlement and Port Vincent, where it has a brief concurrency with LA 42. Continuing northeast, LA 16 follows Pete's Highway across I-12 and into the city of Denham Springs but does not intersect the interstate. Access is instead provided via the parallel LA 3002 (South Range Avenue). In the center of town, LA 16 makes a jog west along US 190 (Florida Avenue) before resuming its northward course. Heading due north from Denham Springs, LA 16 intersects LA 64 near Plainview and proceeds into Watson, where the route's directional banners change from north–south to east–west. Just before crossing into St. Helena Parish, LA 16 begins a concurrency with LA 63 at Weiss.

In St. Helena Parish, LA 16 begins an eastward trajectory away from the Amite River and splits from LA 63. The highway travels through Pine Grove and into the village of Montpelier, where it crosses the Tickfaw River and has a short concurrency with both LA 43 and LA 441. Shortly after crossing into Tangipahoa Parish, LA 16 enters Amite City and passes through an interchange with I-55 at exit 46, connecting with Hammond and Jackson, Mississippi. LA 16 proceeds through the downtown area and crosses both US 51 (Central Avenue) and the Canadian National Railway (CN) tracks at grade. East of Amite City, LA 16 crosses the Tangipahoa River and proceeds toward Washington Parish via Holton.

After crossing the Tchefuncte River into Washington Parish, LA 16 curves to the northeast and makes a loop through the city of Franklinton. This portion of the route overlaps both LA 10 and LA 25 and contains a bridge spanning the Bogue Chitto River that leads onto Washington Street, the city's main east–west thoroughfare. LA 16 turns south from Washington Street onto Main Street and separates from LA 10 and LA 25. South of town, LA 16 parallels the Bogue Chitto River and travels southeastward through Enon, where it intersects LA 60. Near the end of its route, LA 16 enters the northeast corner of St. Tammany Parish and curves due east into the village of Sun. Here, it reaches its eastern terminus at a junction with LA 21, connecting with Bush to the south and Bogalusa to the north.

== History ==
In the original Louisiana Highway system in use between 1921 and 1955, LA 16 was part of several different routes, including State Route 331 from the western terminus to Port Vincent; State Route 131 to Denham Springs; State Route 337 to Watson; State Route 103 to Amite City; State Route 35 to Franklinton; and State Route 469 to Sun. These highways were joined under the single designation of LA 16 when the Louisiana Department of Highways renumbered the state highway system in 1955.

La 16—From a junction with La 22 south of French Settlement through or near Port Vincent, Denham Springs, Pine Grove and Amite to a junction with La 25 at or near Franklinton and from a junction with La 10 at or near Franklinton through or near Enon to a junction with La 21 at or near Sun.

— 1955 legislative route description

Despite its length, the alignment of LA 16 has remained virtually the same since the 1955 renumbering. Alterations to the route have been limited to the smoothing of some curves, the replacement of bridges, and the addition of lanes in urban areas.

In 2008, an approximately 3–4-mile (4.8–6.4 km) stretch of LA 16 in the Denham Springs and Watson areas was widened from two to four lanes. This was in response to the large amount of daily traffic the area experienced in the past decade. (Watson was at one time in the early 2000s the largest growing area in the state of Louisiana).

== Future ==
La DOTD is currently engaged in a program that aims to transfer about 5,000 miles (8,000 km) of state-owned roadways to local governments over the next several years. Under this plan of "right-sizing" the state highway system, the portion of LA 16 that follows Pete's Highway on the south side of Denham Springs is proposed for deletion in favor of the parallel LA 3002 as it no longer meets a significant interurban travel function.

== Major intersections ==
Parish	Location	mi	km	Destinations	Notes
Livingston		0.000	0.000	LA 22 – Sorrento, Springfield	Western terminus
Livingston	French Settlement	1.171– 1.347	1.885– 2.168	Bridge over Amite River	
Livingston	French Settlement	3.018	4.857	LA 444 east	Western terminus of LA 444
Livingston	French Settlement	5.416	8.716	LA 42 east – Springfield	South end of LA 42 concurrency
Livingston	Port Vincent	8.571	13.794	LA 42 west – Gonzales	North end of LA 42 concurrency
Livingston	Port Vincent	10.445	16.810	LA 447 north (Walker South Road) to I-12 – Walker	Southern terminus of LA 447
Livingston		12.151	19.555	LA 1032 north	Southern terminus of LA 1032
Livingston		15.327	24.666	LA 1033 west	Eastern terminus of LA 1033
Livingston		17.877	28.770	LA 1026 north (Juban Road) to I-12	Southern terminus of LA 1026
Livingston		19.871	31.979	LA 1034 west (Vincent Road)	Eastern terminus of LA 1034
Livingston	Denham Springs	21.072	33.912	LA 3003 west (Rushing Road)	Eastern terminus of LA 3003
Livingston	Denham Springs	22.818	36.722	US 190 east (Florida Avenue) – Walker LA 1031 north (Hatchell Lane)	South end of US 190 concurrency
Livingston	Denham Springs	23.648	38.058	US 190 west (Florida Avenue) – Baton Rouge LA 3002 south (South Range Avenue) to I-12	Northern terminus of LA 3002; north end of US 190 concurrency
Livingston		25.527	41.082	LA 1028 west (Old River Road)	Eastern terminus of LA 1028
Livingston		26.833	43.184	LA 64 west (Magnolia Beach Road) – Greenwell Springs LA 1026 east (Lockhart Road)	Eastern terminus of LA 64; western terminus of LA 1026
Livingston		27.452	44.180	LA 1025 east (Arnold Road)	Western terminus of LA 1025
Livingston		28.441	45.771	LA 1024 west (Hunstock Road)	South end of LA 1024 concurrency
Livingston		29.148	46.909	LA 1024 east (Cane Market Road)	North end of LA 1024 concurrency
Livingston	Watson	30.016	48.306	LA 1019	
Livingston		32.683	52.598	LA 1022 south (Fore Road)	Northern terminus of LA 1022
Livingston	Weiss	36.119	58.128	LA 63 south (Weiss Road) – Livingston	West end of LA 63 concurrency
St. Helena		42.407	68.247	LA 63 north – Clinton	East end of LA 63 concurrency
St. Helena	Pine Grove	46.484	74.809	LA 449 south	West end of LA 449 concurrency
St. Helena	Pine Grove	46.546	74.909	LA 449 north – Greensburg LA 1041 south	Northern terminus of LA 1041; east end of LA 449 concurrency
St. Helena	Montpelier	52.988	85.276	LA 441 south	West end of LA 441 concurrency
St. Helena	Montpelier	53.137	85.516	LA 43 north – Greensburg	West end of LA 43 concurrency
St. Helena	Montpelier	53.465– 53.635	86.044– 86.317	Bridge over Tickfaw River	
St. Helena		55.050	88.594	LA 43 south – Albany LA 441 north	East end of LA 43 and LA 441 concurrencies
Tangipahoa		60.312– 60.356	97.063– 97.134	LA 1045 north	Eastern terminus of LA 1045
Tangipahoa	Amite City	60.803– 60.938	97.853– 98.070	I-55 – Hammond, Jackson	Exit 46 on I-55
Tangipahoa	Amite City	62.285	100.238	US 51 (Central Avenue) – Hammond, Kentwood	
Tangipahoa		63.744– 63.811	102.586– 102.694	Bridge over Tangipahoa River	
Tangipahoa		64.325	103.521	LA 1054 north	West end of LA 1054 concurrency
Tangipahoa		65.500	105.412	LA 1054 south	East end of LA 1054 concurrency
Tangipahoa	Holton	71.329	114.793	LA 445 south	Northern terminus of LA 445
Tangipahoa–Washington parish line		77.333– 77.402	124.455– 124.566	Bridge over Tchefuncte River	
Washington		78.300	126.012	LA 450	
Washington		84.514	136.012	LA 25 south – Folsom, Covington	West end of LA 25 concurrency; to Bogue Chitto State Park
Washington		85.744	137.992	LA 10 west – Wilmer	West end of LA 10 concurrency
Washington	Franklinton	86.386– 86.636	139.025– 139.427	Bridge over Bogue Chitto River	
Washington	Franklinton	86.914	139.875	LA 10 east (Washington Street) – Bogalusa LA 25 north (Main Street) – Tylertown	East end of LA 10 and LA 25 concurrencies
Washington		88.471	142.380	LA 1072 east	Western terminus of LA 1072; to Franklinton Airport
Washington	Enon	96.751	155.706	LA 437 south	Northern terminus of LA 437
Washington	Enon	97.414	156.773	LA 60 east – Bogalusa	Western terminus of LA 60
Washington		100.617	161.927	LA 1073 north	Southern terminus of LA 1073
Washington		104.657	168.429	LA 1074 east	Western terminus of LA 1074
St. Tammany	Sun	110.272	177.466	LA 21 – Bush, Bogalusa	Eastern terminus
1.000 mi = 1.609 km; 1.000 km = 0.621 mi: Concurrency terminus
