= Louisiana Highway 1065 =

State highway in Louisiana, United States

Louisiana Highway 1065

Route information
- Maintained by Louisiana DOTD
- Length: 11.1 mi (17.9 km)
- Existed: 1955 renumbering–present

Major junctions
- South end: US 190 in Hammond
- LA 3234 in Hammond; LA 1064 in Tickfaw; LA 442 in Tickfaw
- North end: US 51 / LA 1063 in Independence

Location
- Country: United States
- State: Louisiana
- Parishes: Tangiapahoa

Highway system
- Louisiana State Highway System; Interstate; US; State; Scenic
← LA 1064	→ LA 1067

Louisiana Highway 1065 (LA 1065) is a mostly rural highway in Tangipahoa Parish, Louisiana between Hammond and Independence. In its more trafficked southern end it is known as North Cherry Street and outside Hammond, North Cherry Street Extension. LA 1065 is a two-lane highway for the entirety of its 11.1-mile-length (17.9 km).

== Route description ==
From the south, LA 1065 begins at US 190 in Hammond's Historic District. Proceeding due north, it bridges Ponchatoula Creek and forms a T-intersection with LA 3234 (University Avenue) on the west. It leaves Hammond and enters Tickfaw, crossing crosses LA 1064 (Natalbany Road) and LA 442. North of LA 442, LA 1065 enters Independence and has six sharp turns, the last cosigning it with Cypress Street near central Independence. At the intersection of Cypress Street and Tiger Avenue (so named because the tiger is the mascot of adjacent Independence High School), LA 1065 turns west to follow Tiger Avenue in crossing the Canadian National Railway and immediately to end at the perpendicular US 51 (West Railroad Avenue); directly across that intersection, LA 1063 (cosigned with Fifth Street) assumes the trajectory of LA 1065 and Tiger Avenue.

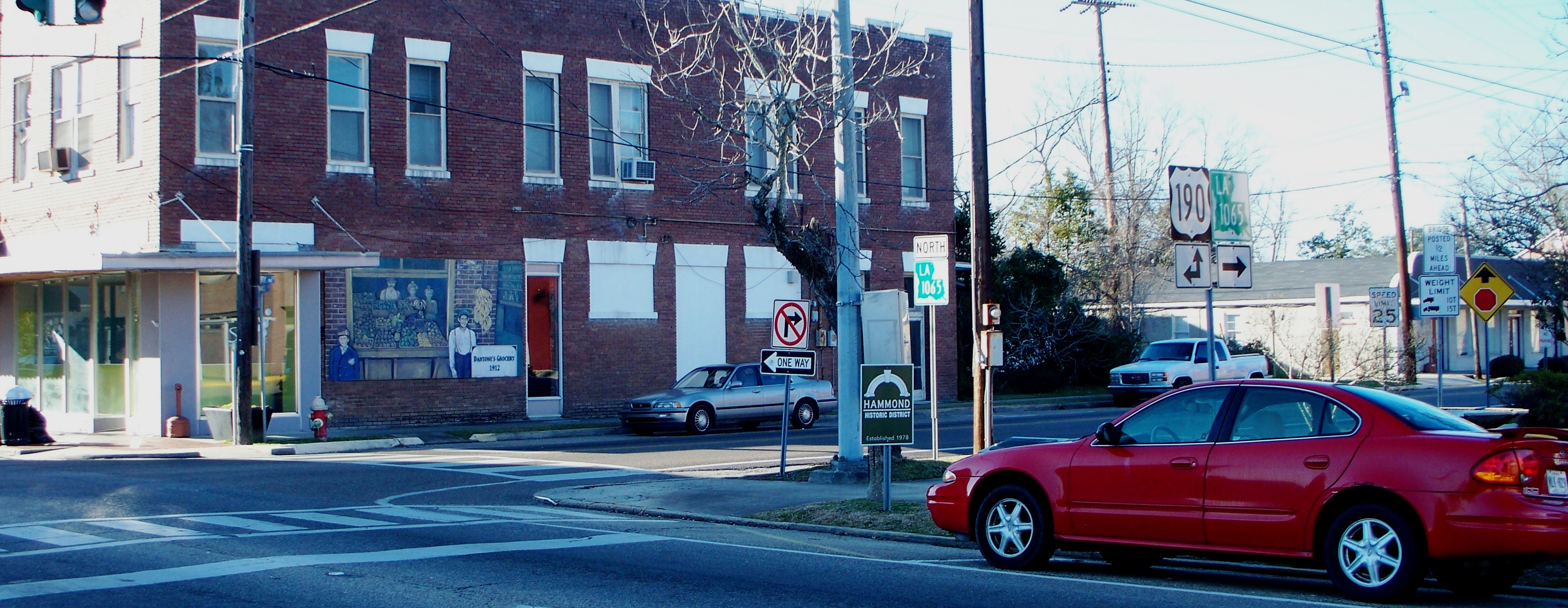
LA 1065 has its southern terminus in Hammond's Historic District. The building in the left background is Dantone's Grocery, founded in 1912 by Italian immigrants.

LA 1065 supports egress for Southeastern Louisiana University via LA 3234. Additionally, it serves significantly as a farm-to-market road and, together with LA 442, facilitates recreational access to the Tangipahoa River.

== History ==
LA 1065 is an old road, its original role in connecting Hammond and Independence having been assumed in the 1930s by US 51, which was in turn sidelined in the 1960s by I-55.

LA 1065 has an anomaly at its southern terminus. US 190 at that point was originally a two-way route entirely on Thomas Street in Hammond. In the 1960s US 190 in Hammond was reconstructed as a divided highway, with westbound traffic on Thomas Street and eastbound traffic one block south on Morris Street. But in the change, accidentally, no provision was made for the one block of Cherry Street between Morris Street and Thomas Street to become state highway. As an afterthought, traffic eastbound on US 190 has a sign reading "TO" LA 1065 with a left arrow. Officially, traffic is not on LA 1065 until it is north of Thomas Street.

== Major intersections ==
The entire highway is in Tangipahoa Parish.

Location	mi	km	Destinations	Notes
Hammond	0.00	0.00	US 190	Southern terminus
Hammond	1.08	1.74	LA 3234 (University Avenue)	
Tickfaw	3.13	5.04	LA 1064 (Natalbany Road)	
Tickfaw	5.56	8.95	LA 442	
Independence	10.22	16.45	US 51 (West Railroad Avenue) / LA 1063 (Fifth Street)	Northern terminus
1.000 mi = 1.609 km; 1.000 km = 0.621 mi
