= Louisiana Highway 25 =

State highway in Louisiana, United States

Louisiana Highway 25

- Route of LA 25 highlighted in red

Route information
- Maintained by Louisiana DOTD
- Length: 38.720 mi (62.314 km)
- Existed: 1955 renumbering–present

Major junctions
- South end: US 190 in Covington
- LA 40 in Folsom; LA 10 / LA 16 in Franklinton; LA 38 at Clifton
- North end: MS 27 at Mississippi state line north of Warnerton

Location
- Country: United States
- State: Louisiana
- Parishes: St. Tammany, Washington

Highway system
- Louisiana State Highway System; Interstate; US; State; Scenic
← LA 24	→ LA 26

Louisiana Highway 25 (LA 25) is a state highway located in southeastern Louisiana. It runs 38.72 miles (62.31 km) in a north–south direction from U.S. Highway 190 (US 190) in Covington to the Mississippi state line north of Warnerton.

The route extends from the Covington city limits through the rural hilly terrain beyond the New Orleans metropolitan area. It travels through northern St. Tammany Parish and traverses neighboring Washington Parish, connecting both parish seats: Covington and Franklinton, respectively. The only other incorporated area along the route is the small village of Folsom.

LA 25 generally runs parallel to the Bogue Falaya and Bogue Chitto rivers, crossing the latter via the Chess Richardson Bridge at Franklinton, which it shares with LA 10 and LA 16. In addition to those routes, LA 25 crosses several rural east–west state highways that traverse the Florida Parishes, including LA 40 in Folsom and LA 38 at Clifton. North of Franklinton, LA 25 crosses the state line and continues as Mississippi Highway 27 (MS 27) toward Tylertown.

LA 25 was created in the 1955 Louisiana Highway renumbering, replacing the former State Route 34. The designation initially extended southward to a different terminus near the present US 190/LA 22 interchange in Mandeville. However, the route has been shortened twice due to realignments of US 190, first in 1956 when US 190 was returned to its original route through Covington and again in 1969 when the Covington Bypass was completed.

== Route description ==
From the south, LA 25 begins at a T-intersection with US 190 at the northern end of Covington, a city in St. Tammany Parish. At this intersection, US 190 turns southeast from Ronald Reagan Highway onto Collins Boulevard as it bypass the downtown area. LA 25 heads northwest on Collins Boulevard, a commercial thoroughfare, and immediately narrows from four to two lanes. Crossing out of the city limits, the surroundings transition to mostly undeveloped woodlands. The highway then passes just to the west of St. Benedict, the location of the historic St. Joseph Abbey and Seminary College. Over its first 10 miles (16 km), LA 25 makes a beeline toward the village of Folsom, running generally parallel and west of the Bogue Falaya River. Once in Folsom, the route proceeds along Orange Street, the town's main thoroughfare. LA 25 overlaps the east–west LA 40 for two blocks, as the latter zigzags between Garfield and Cleveland Streets through town. Signage directs motorists to nearby attractions along LA 40, including the Global Wildlife Center just inside neighboring Tangipahoa Parish. North of Folsom, LA 450 branches northwest off of LA 25, which then winds its way into Washington Parish.

Proceeding northward, LA 25 begins to parallel the Bogue Chitto River, passing just west of Bogue Chitto State Park. LA 16 joins the highway from the west at a T-intersection, and immediately after curving to the northeast, LA 10 does the same at a second T-intersection. The three routes then proceed concurrently across the Bogue Chitto River on the Chess Richardson Bridge, simultaneously entering the town of Franklinton. After briefly curving along Washington Street into the downtown area, the three routes split in different directions at a four-way intersection. While LA 10 continues ahead on Washington Street toward Bogalusa, LA 16 and LA 25 turn southeast and northwest, respectively, onto Main Street. After traveling seven block through a residential neighborhood, LA 25 turns west onto Bene Street at a junction with LA 430 opposite the Washington Parish Fair Grounds.

Curving to the northwest, LA 25 exits Franklinton, and the rural surroundings return as the highway parallels the east bank of the Bogue Chitto River for the remainder of its journey in Louisiana. LA 25 has two further junctions with east–west state highways, the first being LA 38 at Clifton, located 5.4 miles (8.7 km) north of Franklinton. 4.6 miles (7.4 km) beyond this point is a junction with LA 438 which, like LA 38, connects with the small communities of Mount Hermon to the west and Hackley to the east. LA 25 proceeds northward a short distance to the Mississippi state line, where it continues toward Tylertown as Mississippi Highway 27 (MS 27).

=== Route classification and data ===
LA 25 is an undivided two-lane highway for virtually its entire length. The highway is classified as a rural minor arterial by the Louisiana Department of Transportation and Development (La DOTD). Daily traffic volume in 2013 peaked at 19,100 vehicles in Covington, 13,000 in Franklinton, and 10,700 in Folsom. The remainder of the route generally averaged between 2,600 and 5,500 vehicles daily. The posted speed limit is 55 mph (90 km/h) in rural areas, reduced to 35 mph (55 km/h) in Folsom and 25 mph (40 km/h) in Franklinton.

The bridge across the Bogue Chitto River at Franklinton, which is shared by LA 10, LA 16, and LA 25 is officially designated as the Chess Richardson Bridge, in honor of Hardy Chesley "Chess" Richardson (1869-1952), a Franklinton native who served at various times as Postmaster of Franklinton, sheriff of Washington Parish, state senator from District 22, and U.S. Marshal for the Eastern District of Louisiana.

LA 25 also serves as a hurricane evacuation route for the North Shore of Lake Pontchartrain and is one of the few north–south through routes heading into Mississippi between Interstates 55 and 59.

== History ==
=== Pre-1955 route designation ===
In the original Louisiana Highway system in use prior to 1955, the modern LA 25 was part of State Route 34. Designated in 1921 as one of the original 98 state highways, Route 34 also followed the present US 190 corridor from Covington to Slidell. US 190 was assigned to this portion of the route in 1926 when the U.S. Highway System was created. The two highways remained co-signed on the shared route until this practice was largely abandoned with the 1955 Louisiana Highway renumbering.

=== Initial routing and subsequent truncations ===
LA 25 was created in the 1955 renumbering, replacing the portion of former Route 34 independent of US 190.

La 25—From a junction with La-US 190 at or near Chinchuba through or near Covington, Folsom and Franklinton to the Mississippi State Line near Warnerton.

— 1955 legislative route description

During its first year, LA 25 extended south of Covington to a terminus at what is now LA 22 in Mandeville since the renumbering occurred when US 190 was temporarily routed through Madisonville and Ponchatoula. The exact southern terminus of LA 25 was at the present intersection of US 190 and LA 3228 (Asbury Drive). At that time, the highway between Mandeville and Covington was a two-lane road without interchanges or control of access. The original roadbed followed the current southbound lanes south of I-12 and the northbound lanes north of I-12. Additionally, the US 190 bypass of Covington did not yet exist. The original route through town followed the present US 190 Bus. north to LA 21, turning west onto Boston Street then north onto Columbia Street to the present southern terminus of LA 25. When US 190 was moved back to its regular route through Covington in 1956, the southern terminus of LA 25 was cut back to the intersection of Boston and Columbia Streets.

In 1958, the north–south portion of the Covington bypass was opened, which consisted of a new bridge across the Bogue Falaya River and the thoroughfare now known as Collins Boulevard. These improvements formed the northern end of the Greater New Orleans Expressway, of which the Lake Pontchartrain Causeway was the centerpiece. LA 25 was initially moved onto the bypass, which took it out of Downtown Covington. (The old route along Columbia Street became part of an extended LA 437 and the newly designated LA 437 Spur until being removed from the state highway system in 2015.) In 1969, the Covington bypass was completed, which consisted of the east–west portion now known as Ronald Reagan Highway. Now connecting to US 190 at either end, that route was moved onto the bypass, with the old route through the downtown area becoming US 190 Bus., and LA 25 was cut back once more to its present southern terminus.

=== Later improvements ===
Outside of Covington, LA 25 has experienced only minor changes. The first was a slight altering of the route through Franklinton shortly after the 1955 renumbering. LA 25 originally turned north from Washington Street onto Cleveland Street before continuing onto Main Street. The change had the highway turn directly onto Main Street, which simplified the highway junctions in Franklinton, as LA 10, LA 16, and LA 25 now intersected at the same four-way intersection.

Several minor curves were straightened when the entirety of LA 25 north of Franklinton was widened and repaved in 1960. The first was at the junction with LA 38 at Clifton, where the original route survives as two local roads, Fred Thomas Road and Winnifred Bateman Road. The second was just south of Warnerton, where the old route survives as Sanford Road. The third was just north of the LA 438 junction where the old route has been abandoned. Another curve was straightened south of Folsom when a new bridge was built over Morgan Branch as part of the widening and resurfacing of the highway south of Franklinton in 1963.

A new $8.2 million concrete beam bridge across the Bogue Chitto River bridge at Franklinton began construction on February 6, 1995 and opened to traffic on March 18, 1998, replacing a pony truss bridge dating from 1935. The span was officially named the Chess Richardson Bridge by an act of the state legislature in 1998.

== Major intersections ==
Parish	Location	mi	km	Destinations	Notes
St. Tammany	Covington	0.000	0.000	US 190 west (Ronald Reagan Highway) – Hammond US 190 east (Collins Boulevard) to I-12 – Covington	Southern terminus
St. Tammany		4.813	7.746	LA 1078 west	Eastern terminus of LA 1078
St. Tammany		6.316	10.165	LA 1077 south	Northern terminus of LA 1077
St. Tammany	Folsom	10.155	16.343	LA 40 west (Garfield Street)	Southern end of LA 40 concurrency
St. Tammany	Folsom	10.295	16.568	LA 40 east (Cleveland Street)	Northern end of LA 40 concurrency
St. Tammany		13.095	21.074	LA 450 north (McDougal Road)	Southern terminus of LA 450
Washington		24.369– 24.403	39.218– 39.273	LA 16 west – Amite	Southern end of LA 16 concurrency
Washington		25.626	41.241	LA 10 west	Southern end of LA 10 concurrency
Washington	Franklinton	26.261– 26.511	42.263– 42.665	Chess Richardson Bridge over Bogue Chitto River	
Washington	Franklinton	26.789	43.113	LA 10 east (Washington Street) – Bogalusa LA 16 east (Main Street)	Northern end of LA 10 and LA 16 concurrencies
Washington	Franklinton	27.567– 27.594	44.365– 44.408	LA 430 east (Bene Street)	Southern terminus of LA 430
Washington	Clifton	33.348	53.668	LA 38 – Mt. Hermon, Hackley	
Washington	Warnerton	37.958	61.087	LA 438 – Mt. Hermon, Hackley	
Washington		38.720	62.314	MS 27 north – Tylertown	Northern terminus; continuation in Mississippi
1.000 mi = 1.609 km; 1.000 km = 0.621 mi: Concurrency terminus
