= Louisiana Highway 445 =

State highway in Louisiana, United States

Louisiana Highway 445

Route information
- Maintained by Louisiana DOTD
- Length: 24.6 mi (39.6 km)

Major junctions
- South end: LA 22 near Ponchatoula
- I-12 south of Robert; US 190 in Robert
- North end: LA 16 east of Amite

Location
- Country: United States
- State: Louisiana
- Parishes: Tangipahoa

Highway system
- Louisiana State Highway System; Interstate; US; State; Scenic
← LA 444	→ LA 447

Louisiana Highway 445 (LA 445) is a state highway in Louisiana that serves Tangipahoa Parish. It spans 24.6 miles (39.6 km) in a south to north direction. Near its north end, it is known as Husser Road.

== Route description ==
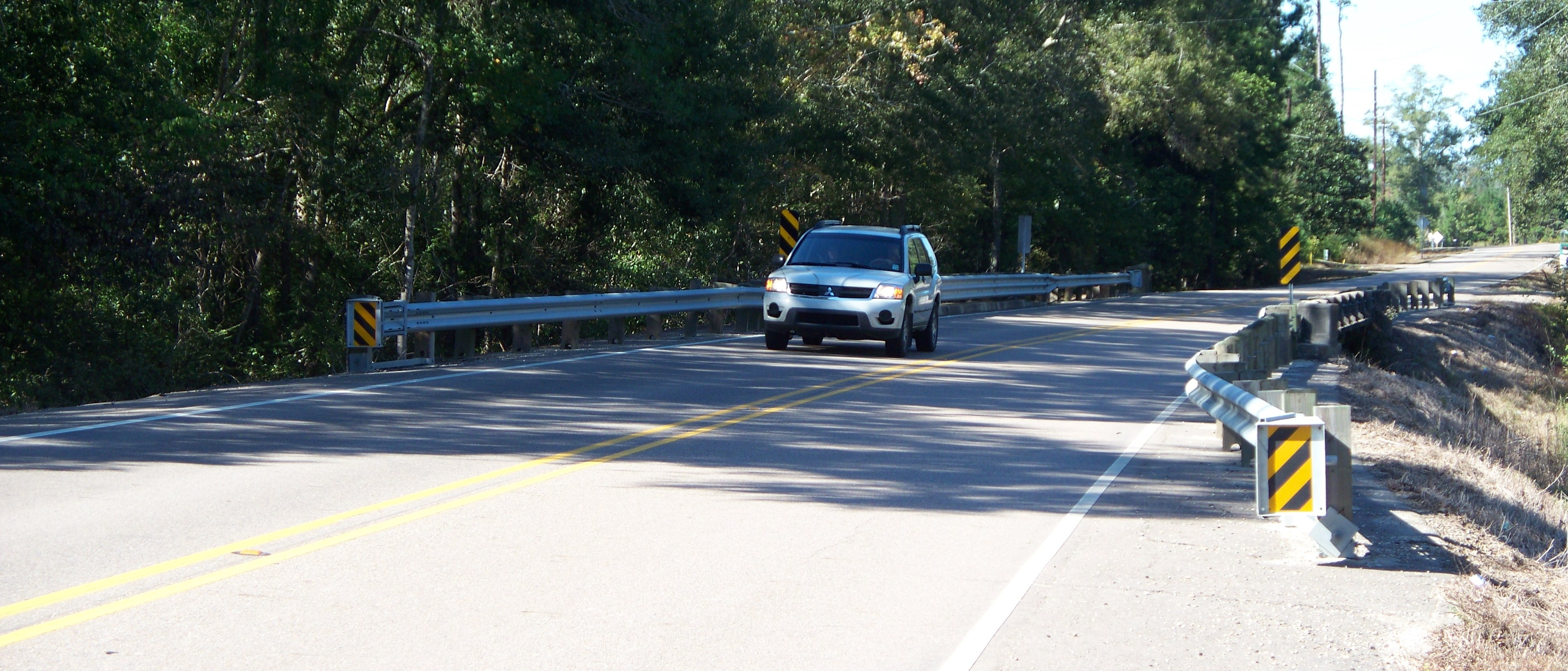
Looking north at LA 445 at the bridge over Sims Creek south of Robert

From the south, LA 445 begins near Lee's Landing. It heads north, intersects LA 22 and turns eastward to follow it for about a half-mile before turning back north. The highway heads toward the community of Robert, crossing Sims Creek and then intersecting (overpassing) I-12 at a folded-diamond interchange (Exit 47). At Robert, LA 445 and US 190 cross at a traffic signal. Continuing northward, LA 445 meets LA 40 (which it overlaps for about one mile) near Uneedus and passes along the eastern boundary of the Zemurray Gardens Lodge Complex. After a northwestward jog, LA 445 meets LA 1062 near Husser. At that point, the road turns back northward (becoming Husser Road) until it ends at LA 16 east of Amite.

LA 445 is an undivided, two-lane highway for its entire length with exception of the on-off ramps, left turn lanes, and traffic islands at the I-12 interchange and at certain other intersections.

== Major intersections ==
The entire highway is in Tangipahoa Parish.

Location	mi	km	Destinations	Notes
	0.0	0.0	LA 22	
Robert	2.9– 3.3	4.7– 5.3	I-12 – Slidell, Hammond	Exit 47 (I-12)
Robert	5.0	8.0	US 190	
Uneedus	12.8	20.6	LA 40 west	Southern end of LA 40 concurrency
Uneedus	13.8	22.2	LA 40 east	Northern end of LA 40 concurrency
Husser	17.5	28.2	LA 1062 south (Neal Road)	Northern terminus of LA 1062
Holton	24.6	39.6	LA 16	
1.000 mi = 1.609 km; 1.000 km = 0.621 mi: Concurrency terminus
