= GWC =

GWC may refer to:

- Dutch West India Company (Dutch: Geoctroyeerde Westindische Compagnie)
- Gambian Workers' Confederation, a Gambian trade union
- General Watch Co, a defunct Swiss watchmaker
- George Watson's College, in Edinburgh, Scotland
- George Whitefield College, in Cape Town, South Africa
- George Wilson Cup, football cup competition in Northern Ireland
- George Wythe College, now George Wythe University, in Salt Lake City, Utah, United States
- Global Wildlife Center, a conservation charity
- Golden West College, in Huntington Beach, California, United States
- Government Wine Cellar, of the government of the United Kingdom
- Great Wall of China, a series of fortifications
- Great West Conference, an American college athletic conference
- The Great Western Chorus of Bristol, a British choir
- Green–white–checker finish, a procedure in North American auto racing
- Green Worker Cooperatives, a worker cooperative incubator in New York City
- Kalami language, spoken in Pakistan
