= Washington Parish School Board =

School district in Louisiana, United States

Coordinates: 30.8477°N 90.1583°W

Washington Parish School Board is a school district headquartered in Franklinton, Louisiana, United States.

The district serves most of Washington Parish. However Bogalusa, Rio, and some unincorporated areas are in Bogalusa City Schools.

== School uniforms ==
All Washington Parish schools are required to adopt school uniforms for students.

== Schools ==
=== PK-12 schools ===
- Mount Hermon School (Unincorporated area)

=== 6-12 schools ===
- Franklinton High School (Franklinton)
- Pine Junior/Senior High School (Unincorporated area)
- Varnado High School (Varnado)

=== 6-8 schools ===
- Angie Junior High School (Angie)
- Franklinton Junior High School (Franklinton)

=== PK-6 schools ===
- Enon Elementary School (Unincorporated area)

=== PK-5 schools ===
- Wesley Ray Elementary School (Unincorporated area)
- Thomas Elementary School (Unincorporated area)
- Varnado Elenmentary School (Unincorporated area)

=== 3-5 schools ===
- Franklinton Elementary School (Franklinton)

=== PK-2 schools ===
- Franklinton Primary School (Franklinton)
