= Bickham, Louisiana =

- Unincorporated community
- Location within Louisiana Location within the United States
- Coordinates: 30°52′03″N 90°12′56″W
- Country: United States
- State: Louisiana
- Parish: Washington
- Elevation: 210 ft (64 m)
- Time zone: UTC-6 (Central (CST))
  - Summer (DST): UTC-5 (CDT)
- Area code: 985
- GNIS feature ID: 542987
- FIPS code: 22-07190

Bickham is an unincorporated community in Washington Parish, Louisiana, United States. The community is located 4 miles (6.44 kilometres) W. of Franklinton, Louisiana.

== Name origin ==
The community name is derived from an early settler in the area. The Bickham family first settled Washington parish in the year 1799.
