= Pine Cliff, Louisiana =

- Ghost town
- Location within Louisiana Location within the United States
- Coordinates: 30°46′59″N 90°07′24″W
- Country: United States
- State: Louisiana
- Parish: Washington
- Elevation: 135 ft (41 m)
- Time zone: UTC-6 (Central (CST))
  - Summer (DST): UTC-5 (CDT)
- Area code: 985
- GNIS feature ID: 559704
- FIPS code: 22-60300

Pine Cliff was an unincorporated community in Washington Parish, Louisiana, United States. It was located 4 miles (6.44 kilometres) S of Franklinton, Louisiana. It was the site of a lumber plant in the early 20th century.
