= Isabel, Louisiana =

- Unincorporated community
- Location within Louisiana Location within the United States
- Coordinates: 30°40′30″N 89°59′56″W
- Country: United States
- State: Louisiana
- Parish: Washington
- Elevation: 92 ft (28 m)
- Time zone: UTC-6 (Central (CST))
  - Summer (DST): UTC-5 (CDT)
- Area code: 985
- GNIS feature ID: 559687
- FIPS code: 22-37620

Isabel is an unincorporated community in Washington Parish, Louisiana, United States. The community is located 15 miles (24.14 kilometres) NE of Covington, Louisiana.
