= Porters Curve, Louisiana =

- Unincorporated community
- Location within Louisiana Location within the United States
- Coordinates: 30°57′33″N 90°19′01″W
- Country: United States
- State: Louisiana
- Parish: Washington
- Elevation: 331 ft (101 m)
- Time zone: UTC-6 (Central (CST))
  - Summer (DST): UTC-5 (CDT)
- Area code: 985
- GNIS feature ID: 555712
- FIPS code: 22-61945

Porters Curve is an unincorporated community in Washington Parish, Louisiana, United States. The community is located 12 miles (19.31 kilometres) NW of Franklinton, Louisiana.
