= Chesbrough =

Chesbrough may refer to:

== People ==
- Ellis S. Chesbrough (1813–1886), American engineer
- Henry Chesbrough (born 1956), American organizational theorist

== Places ==
- Chesbrough, Louisiana
- Chesbrough Seminary
