= Natalbany, Louisiana =

- CDP
- Location of Natalbany in Louisiana
- Coordinates: 30°32′55″N 90°29′42″W
- Country: United States
- State: Louisiana
- Parish: Tangipahoa

Area
  - Total: 4.47 sq mi (11.58 km^{2})
  - Land: 4.42 sq mi (11.46 km^{2})
  - Water: 0.042 sq mi (0.11 km^{2})
- Elevation: 56 ft (17 m)

Population (2020)
  - Total: 2,510
  - Density: 567.1/sq mi (218.97/km^{2})
- Time zone: UTC-6 (CST)
  - Summer (DST): UTC-5 (CDT)
- Area code: 985
- FIPS code: 22-53475
- GNIS feature ID: 2403328

Natalbany is a census-designated place (CDP) in Tangipahoa Parish, Louisiana, United States. As of the 2020 census, Natalbany had a population of 2,510. It is part of the Hammond MSA.

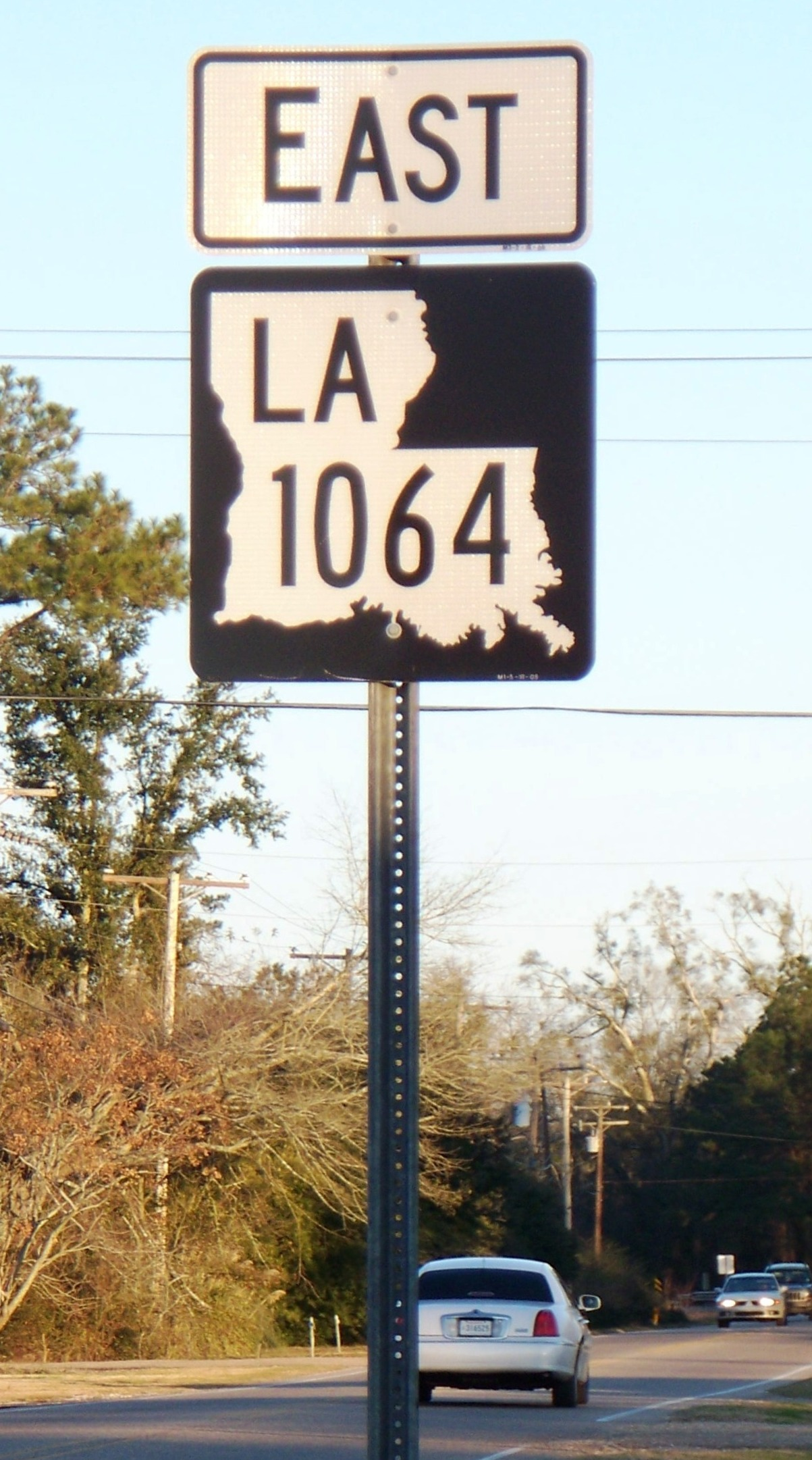
In 2009, Natalbany was among the first communities in Louisiana to get Louisiana's new black-and-white state highway shields. Shown here: LA 1064 from Natalbany center, looking east.

== Etymology ==
The community is named after the nearby Natalbany River. It is speculated that the name of the river is derived from the Choctaw words nita meaning bear and abani which means "to cook over a fire" in the Choctaw language.

== Geography ==
According to the United States Census Bureau, the CDP has a total area of 4.5 square miles (12 km^{2}), of which 4.4 square miles (11 km^{2}) is land and 0.1 square miles (0.26 km^{2}) (1.56%) is water (including Ponchatoula Creek).

== Demographics ==
Historical population
Census	Pop.	Note	%±
1990	1,289		—
2000	1,739		34.9%
2010	2,984		71.6%
2020	2,510		−15.9%
U.S. Decennial Census; 1950 1960 1970 1980; 1990 2000 2010

Natalbany first appeared as a census designated place the 1990 U.S. census.

Natalbany racial composition as of 2020
Race	Number	Percentage
White (non-Hispanic)	1,154	45.98%
Black or African American (non-Hispanic)	1,030	41.04%
Native American	13	0.52%
Asian	19	0.76%
Other/Mixed	81	3.23%
Hispanic or Latino	213	8.49%

As of the 2020 United States census, there were 2,510 people, 1,130 households, and 553 families residing in the CDP.
