= Pine, Louisiana =

Coordinates: 30°54′28″N 90°00′49″W

- unincorporated community
- Hamlet of Pine
- Interactive map of Pine, Louisiana
- Country: United States
- States: Louisiana

Pine is an unincorporated community located in Washington Parish, Louisiana, United States. It is home to Pine Junior/Senior High School, a K-12 school with approximately 600 students. Pine utilizes the zip code from the neighboring town of Franklinton. Pine is accessed be either LA highway 62 (N-S) or LA highway 436 (E-W). Pine has several small, family owned businesses. In September 2010 the first, and only (to date) retail chain store opened. The businesses surround the 62-436 intersection and flow north on Hwy 62 toward the "New" High School.
