= Independence High Magnet School =

Location
- 270 Tiger Avenue; Independence, (Tangipahoa Parish), Louisiana 70443; United States
- Coordinates: 30.6347°N 90.4944°W

Information
- Type: Public high school
- School district: Tangipahoa Parish School Board
- Principal: Donnis Cassanave
- Staff: 31.52 (on an FTE basis)
- Enrollment: 515 (2023–24)
- Student to teacher ratio: 16.34
- Colors: Purple and gold
- Mascot: Tiger
- Nickname: Tigers

Independence High Magnet School is a senior high school in Independence, Louisiana, United States. It is a part of the Tangipahoa Parish School Board.

== Athletics ==
Independence High Magnet athletics competes in the LHSAA.
