= Arcola, Louisiana =

Unincorporated community in Louisiana

- Unincorporated community
- Location within Louisiana Location within the United States
- Coordinates: 30°46′36″N 90°30′37″W
- Country: United States
- State: Louisiana
- Parish: Tangipahoa
- Elevation: 41 ft (12 m)
- Time zone: UTC−6 (Central (CST))
  - Summer (DST): UTC−5 (CDT)
- Area code: 985
- GNIS feature ID: 553313
- FIPS code: 22-02760

Arcola is an unincorporated community in Tangipahoa Parish, Louisiana.

== Etymology ==
Some local residents believe that during the New Orleans yellow fever epidemic in the year 1853 several Italian families settled in the area. It is speculated that these first settlers named the village after Arcole a small comune in the province of Verona, Italy.

== Prospect Hill ==
In the mid 1800s Arcola was also named Prospect Hill. In the year 1851 the New Orleans, Jackson and Great Northern railway was constructed and passed through the community. Some have speculated that the railroad gave the name "Prospect Hill" to the area. A local resident attempted to use this as a defense to avoid paying back a promissory note. In the year 1855 the case of Joseph Lallande vs William G. Hope was brought before the Louisiana Supreme Court because the defendant lived in Arcola but his promissory note was sent to "Prospect Hill".
