= Bogalusa School Board =

School district in Louisiana

Location
- Bogalusa, Louisiana, United States
- Coordinates: 30.7598°N 89.8483°W

District information
- Type: Public
- Superintendent: Byron Hurst (since 2023)
- Schools: Bogalusa High School, Central Elementary School, Byrd Avenue Primary School (formerly Byrd Avenue Elementary School)

Other information
- Website: Official Website

Bogalusa School Board is a school district headquartered in Bogalusa, Louisiana, United States. Byron Hurst has been the superintendent since 2023.

The district serves the City of Bogalusa, Rio, and several unincorporated areas in Washington Parish.

== History ==
The school district was racially integrated prior to 1970. However, after 1970, the school's racial demographics shifted to approximately 60% white students and 40% black students.

In 2013, a major grade level (educational stage) reconfiguration and school merger occurred, reducing the number of schools from five to three.

== Schools ==
The schools in the district are located in the City of Bogalusa.

School Status	School name
Currently Operating	Bogalusa High School
Currently Operating	Bogalusa Junior High School
Currently Operating	Central Elementary School
Currently Operating	Byrd Avenue Primary School (formerly Byrd Avenue Elementary School)
Former	Bogalusa High School West
Former	Northside Technology Middle School
Former	Pleasant Hill Elementary School
Former	Superior Avenue Elementary School
Former	Denhamtown Elementary Pre-K
