= Mount Hermon, Louisiana =

Unincorporated community in Louisiana, U.S.

Coordinates: 30°57′37″N 90°17′45″W

Mount Hermon is an unincorporated community in northwestern Washington Parish, Louisiana, United States. It is the home of the Yellow Jackets of Mount Hermon High School. The Mile Branch Settlement at the Washington Parish Free Fair is the current home of the old one room school house that was originally built by the pioneers of Mount Hermon, Louisiana. The ZIP Code for Mount Hermon is 70450.

After the civil war, the Ott family donated their land for a school house to be built on. Mount Hermon is part of the Washington Parish School Board, alongside other schools such as Franklinton, Pine, and Varnado.

The Louisiana politician Jesse Homer Bankston, Sr., was born in Mount Hermon as was Lionel Ott, a member of the Louisiana State Senate and the New Orleans City Council in the 1940s and 1950s.
