= Greenlaw, Louisiana =

Unincorporated community in Louisiana

- Unincorporated community
- Location within Louisiana Location within the United States
- Coordinates: 30°59′04″N 90°29′05″W
- Country: United States
- State: Louisiana
- Parish: Tangipahoa
- Elevation: 259 ft (79 m)
- Time zone: UTC-6 (Central (CST))
  - Summer (DST): UTC-5 (CDT)
- Area code: 985
- GNIS feature ID: 554619
- FIPS code: 22-31460

Greenlaw is an unincorporated community in Tangipahoa Parish, Louisiana, United States. The community is located 17 miles (27.4 km) north of Amite City, Louisiana.

== Name origin ==
The community is named after a local sawmill owned by Edward Runnels Greenlaw who owned and operated the Greenlaw Lumber Company.
