= Rio, Louisiana =

- Census-designated place
- Location within Louisiana Location within the United States
- Coordinates: 30°41′35″N 89°53′24″W
- Country: United States
- State: Louisiana
- Parish: Washington

Area
  - Total: 1.14 sq mi (2.94 km^{2})
  - Land: 1.14 sq mi (2.94 km^{2})
  - Water: 0 sq mi (0.00 km^{2})
- Elevation: 98 ft (30 m)

Population (2020)
  - Total: 137
  - Density: 120.9/sq mi (46.68/km^{2})
- Time zone: UTC-6 (Central (CST))
  - Summer (DST): UTC-5 (CDT)
- Area code: 985
- GNIS feature ID: 543624

Rio is an unincorporated community and census-designated place (CDP) in Washington Parish, Louisiana, United States. It was first listed as a CDP in the 2020 census with a population of 137.

Rio is located at the junction of Louisiana highways 1074 and 1075, 7.2 miles (11.6 km) south-southwest of Bogalusa.

== Demographics ==
Historical population
Census	Pop.	Note	%±
2020	137		—
U.S. Decennial Census; 2020

Rio was first listed as a census designated place in the 2020 U.S. census.

Rio CDP, Louisiana – Racial and ethnic composition Note: the US Census treats Hispanic/Latino as an ethnic category. This table excludes Latinos from the racial categories and assigns them to a separate category. Hispanics/Latinos may be of any race.
Race / Ethnicity (NH = Non-Hispanic)	Pop 2020	2020
White alone (NH)	119	86.86%
Black or African American alone (NH)	1	0.73%
Native American or Alaska Native alone (NH)	1	0.73%
Asian alone (NH)	0	0.00%
Native Hawaiian or Pacific Islander alone (NH)	0	0.00%
Other race alone (NH)	1	0.73%
Mixed race or Multiracial (NH)	13	9.49%
Hispanic or Latino (any race)	2	1.46%
Total	137	100.00%

At the 2020 census, its population was 317; and the CDP was predominantly non-Hispanic white.

== Education ==
It is in Bogalusa City Schools, which operates Bogalusa High School.
