= Plainview, Louisiana =

- Unincorporated community
- Location within Louisiana Location within the United States
- Coordinates: 30°45′06″N 89°58′08″W
- Country: United States
- State: Louisiana
- Parish: Washington
- Elevation: 230 ft (70 m)
- Time zone: UTC-6 (Central (CST))
  - Summer (DST): UTC-5 (CDT)
- Area code: 985
- GNIS feature ID: 543985
- FIPS code: 22-60740

Plainview is an unincorporated community in Washington Parish, Louisiana, United States. The community is located 6 miles (9.66 kilometres) S of Bogalusa, Louisiana.
