= Bolivar, Louisiana =

Unincorporated community in Louisiana

- Unincorporated community
- Location within Louisiana Location within the United States
- Coordinates: 30°52′09″N 90°23′41″W
- Country: United States
- State: Louisiana
- Parish: Tangipahoa
- Elevation: 223 ft (68 m)
- Time zone: UTC-6 (Central (CST))
  - Summer (DST): UTC-5 (CDT)
- Area code: 985
- GNIS feature ID: 543005

Bolivar is an unincorporated community in Tangipahoa Parish, Louisiana, United States.

== History ==
Bolivar was named for the first postmaster, Bolivar Varnado.
