= Global Wildlife Center =

Louisiana wildlife preserve

Coordinates: 30.629°N 90.286°W

- Interactive map of Global Wildlife Center
- Date opened: 1991
- Location: Folsom, Louisiana
- No. of animals: Thousands
- Website: https://globalwildlife.com

The Global Wildlife Center is a free-roaming wildlife preserve in Folsom, Louisiana. It is situated on a 900 acres (360 ha) preserve and hosts about 1000 animals. Visitors tour the facility in covered safari wagons or private 4x4 vehicles accompanied by a tour guide who teaches about animal facts and behaviors, habitat, conservation, and more.

Following founder Ken Matherne’s death in the fall of 2021, daughter Maci Matherne took over management.
