= Warnerton, Louisiana =

- Unincorporated community
- Location within Louisiana Location within the United States
- Coordinates: 30°59′25″N 90°10′59″W
- Country: United States
- State: Louisiana
- Parish: Washington
- Elevation: 200 ft (61 m)
- Time zone: UTC-6 (Central (CST))
  - Summer (DST): UTC-5 (CDT)
- Area code: 985
- GNIS feature ID: 559723
- FIPS code: 22-79800

Warnerton is an unincorporated community in Washington Parish, Louisiana, United States. The community is located 10 miles (16.09 kilometres) N of Franklinton, Louisiana.
