= Sun, Louisiana =

- Village
- Location of Sun in St. Tammany Parish, Louisiana.

- Location of Louisiana in the United States
- Coordinates: 30°39′00″N 89°54′01″W
- Country: United States
- State: Louisiana
- Parish: St. Tammany

Area
  - Total: 4.50 sq mi (11.66 km^{2})
  - Land: 4.27 sq mi (11.05 km^{2})
  - Water: 0.23 sq mi (0.60 km^{2})
- Elevation: 69 ft (21 m)

Population (2020)
  - Total: 392
  - Density: 91.8/sq mi (35.46/km^{2})
- Time zone: UTC-6 (CST)
  - Summer (DST): UTC-5 (CDT)
- Area code: 985
- FIPS code: 22-73955
- Website: https://www.villageofsun.com/

Sun is a village in the northeastern corner of St. Tammany Parish, Louisiana, United States. The population was 470 at the 2010 census, and 392 in 2020. It is part of the New Orleans–Metairie–Kenner metropolitan statistical area.

== Geography ==
Sun is located at 30°39′0″N 89°54′1″W. According to the United States Census Bureau, the village has a total area of 4.5 square miles (12 km^{2}), of which 4.3 square miles (11 km^{2}) is land and 0.1 square miles (0.26 km^{2}) (3.14%) is water.

== Demographics ==
Historical population
Census	Pop.	Note	%±
1960	224		—
1970	288		28.6%
1980	404		40.3%
1990	429		6.2%
2000	471		9.8%
2010	470		−0.2%
2020	392		−16.6%
2025 (est.)	401	▲	2.3%
U.S. Decennial Census

As of the census of 2000, there were 471 people, 193 households, and 134 families residing in the village. The population density was 109.0 inhabitants per square mile (42.1/km^{2}). There were 217 housing units at an average density of 50.2 per square mile (19.4/km^{2}). The racial makeup of the village was 85.99% White, 11.46% African American, 0.42% Native American, 0.42% Asian, and 1.70% from two or more races. Hispanic or Latino of any race were 0.42% of the population.

There were 193 households, out of which 14.5% had a female householder with no husband present, and 30.1% were non-families. 23.8% of all households were made up of individuals, and 9.3% had someone living alone who was 65 years of age or older. The average household size was 2.44 and the average family size was 2.82.

In the village, the population was spread out, with 22.5% under the age of 18, 7.9% from 18 to 24, 28.0% from 25 to 44, 28.0% from 45 to 64, and 13.6% who were 65 years of age or older. The median age was 41 years. For every 100 females, there were 98.7 males. For every 100 females age 18 and over, there were 99.5 males.

The median income for a household in the village was $25,833, and the median income for a family was $29,750. Males had a median income of $29,286 versus $18,929 for females. The per capita income for the village was $12,391. About 11.8% of families and 20.8% of the population were below the poverty line, including 18.1% of those under age 18 and 17.2% of those age 65 or over.

== Education ==
St. Tammany Parish Public Schools serves Sun residents.

Fifth Ward Junior High School in unincorporated St. Tammany Parish serves K-8.

Covington High School in Covington serves Sun residents.

St. Tammany Parish is within the service areas of two community colleges: Northshore Technical Community College and Delgado Community College.
