= Clifton, Louisiana =

- Unincorporated community
- Location within Louisiana Location within the United States
- Coordinates: 31°18′19″N 92°52′17″W
- Country: United States
- State: Louisiana
- Parish: Rapides
- Elevation: 236 ft (72 m)
- Time zone: UTC-6 (Central (CST))
  - Summer (DST): UTC-5 (CDT)
- ZIP code: 71477
- Area code: 318
- GNIS feature ID: 547231

Clifton is an unincorporated community in Rapides Parish, Louisiana, United States. Its ZIP code is 71477.
