= Chesbrough, Louisiana =

- Unincorporated community
- Location within Louisiana Location within the United States
- Coordinates: 30°50′56″N 90°27′22″W
- Country: United States
- State: Louisiana
- Parish: Tangipahoa
- Elevation: 226 ft (69 m)
- Time zone: UTC-6 (Central (CST))
  - Summer (DST): UTC-5 (CDT)
- Area code: 985
- GNIS feature ID: 543081
- FIPS code: 22-14835

Chesbrough is an unincorporated community in Tangipahoa Parish, Louisiana, United States. The community is located 8 miles (12.87 kilometres) N of Amite City, Louisiana.
