= Folsom, Louisiana =

- Village
- Location of Folsom in St. Tammany Parish, Louisiana.

- Location of Louisiana in the United States
- Coordinates: 30°37′50″N 90°11′41″W
- Country: United States
- State: Louisiana
- Parish: St. Tammany

Government
  - Mayor: Lance Willie (R)

Area
  - Total: 1.92 sq mi (4.98 km^{2})
  - Land: 1.91 sq mi (4.94 km^{2})
  - Water: 0.015 sq mi (0.04 km^{2})
- Elevation: 157 ft (48 m)

Population (2020)
  - Total: 769
  - Density: 402.9/sq mi (155.55/km^{2})
- Time zone: UTC-6 (CST)
  - Summer (DST): UTC-5 (CDT)
- Area code: 985
- FIPS code: 22-26140
- GNIS feature ID: 2407456
- Website: www.villageoffolsom.com

Folsom is a village in St. Tammany Parish, Louisiana, United States. The population was 716 at the 2010 census, and 769 in 2020. The town is named after the wife of Grover Cleveland, Frances Folsom. It is part of the New Orleans–Metairie–Kenner metropolitan statistical area.

== Geography ==
Folsom is located along Louisiana Highway 25 approximately 12 miles north-northwest of Covington. According to the United States Census Bureau, the village has a total area of 1.7 square miles (4.3 km^{2}), all land.

== Demographics ==
Historical population
Census	Pop.	Note	%±
1950	166		—
1960	225		35.5%
1970	249		10.7%
1980	319		28.1%
1990	469		47.0%
2000	525		11.9%
2010	716		36.4%
2020	769		7.4%
2025 (est.)	846	▲	10.0%
U.S. Decennial Census

As of the census of 2000, there were 525 people, 197 households, and 142 families in the village. The population density was 344.0 inhabitants per square mile (132.8/km^{2}). There were 222 housing units at an average density of 145.4 per square mile (56.1/km^{2}). The racial makeup of the village was 72.95% White, 24.95% African American, 0.57% Native American, 0.38% from other races, and 1.14% from two or more races. Hispanic or Latino of any race were 3.43% of the population.

Of the 197 households 36.0% had children under the age of 18 living with them, 54.8% were married couples living together, 11.7% had a female householder with no husband present, and 27.9% were non-families. 24.4% of households were one person and 10.7% were one person aged 65 or older. The average household size was 2.66 and the average family size was 3.18.

The age distribution was 27.2% under the age of 18, 8.6% from 18 to 24, 30.1% from 25 to 44, 22.7% from 45 to 64, and 11.4% 65 or older. The median age was 36 years. For every 100 females, there were 92.3 males. For every 100 females age 18 and over, there were 91.0 males.

The median household income was $33,889 and the median family income was $42,500. Males had a median income of $24,167 versus $19,250 for females. The per capita income for the village was $14,982. About 13.6% of families and 15.5% of the population were below the poverty line, including 17.3% of those under age 18 and 8.3% of those age 65 or over.

== Education ==
St. Tammany Parish Public Schools serves Folsom residents.

Folsom Elementary School in Folsom serves grades K-5. Folsom Middle School in Folsom serves grades 6–8. Covington High School serves residents in grades 9–12.

St. Tammany Parish Library operates the Folsom Library.

== Notable people ==
- Werly Fairburn, rockabilly musician
- Tanner Rainey, professional baseball player
- Tramain Jacobs, professional football player
- Sammy Jones, American Greco-Roman wrestler, two-time United States World Team member

== See also ==
- WJSH: country radio station in Folsom
- Global Wildlife Center
