= Enon, Louisiana =

Unincorporated community in Louisiana

- Unincorporated community
- Location within Louisiana Location within the United States
- Coordinates: 30°43′39″N 90°05′03″W
- Country: United States
- State: Louisiana
- Parish: Washington
- Elevation: 112 ft (34 m)
- Time zone: UTC-6 (Central (CST))
  - Summer (DST): UTC-5 (CDT)
- Area code: 985
- GNIS feature ID: 543186
- FIPS code: 22-23995

Enon is an unincorporated community in Washington Parish, Louisiana, United States. The community is located 9 miles (14.48 kilometres) SE of Franklinton, Louisiana.

== Etymology ==
The name of the community is derived from a variant spelling of Ænon, the site mentioned by the Gospel of John as the place where John was baptising after his encounter with Jesus.

== History ==
In 1813, a courthouse and jail was built in Enon because the community was at the center of St. Tammany Parish. Enon was designated as the parish seat for St. Tammany Parish. Then in 1819, Washington parish was formed and the parish seat was moved out of Enon.
