= Husser, Louisiana =

- Unincorporated community
- Location within Louisiana Location within the United States
- Coordinates: 30°40′46″N 90°20′14″W
- Country: United States
- State: Louisiana
- Parish: Tangipahoa
- Elevation: 144 ft (44 m)
- Time zone: UTC-6 (Central (CST))
  - Summer (DST): UTC-5 (CDT)
- ZIP code: 70442
- Area code: 985
- GNIS feature ID: 541113

Husser is an unincorporated community in Tangipahoa Parish, Louisiana, United States. Its ZIP code is 70442.

This area, which was once known to the Choctaw as Chappepeela, meaning “Hurricane River,” was generally the same area known as Husser today. Later named for some of its earliest and most entrepreneurial settlers, Husser extends over approximately 16 square miles.

Husser is home to two sites listed on the National Register, only one of which is open to the public. The Husser Community Center was originally constructed in 1921 and served as the Husser School for over 20 years before being closed due to consolidation. In 1946 the community organization purchased the school and two acres at highest auction bid, and transformed the school into the community Center. In 2019, after being dormant for nearly 20 years, the Husser Community Organization began soliciting funds to restore the building to its former glory, as its suffered some age and decay. In December 2020, the building was officially added to the National Register of Historic Places.
