= Independence, Louisiana =

- Town
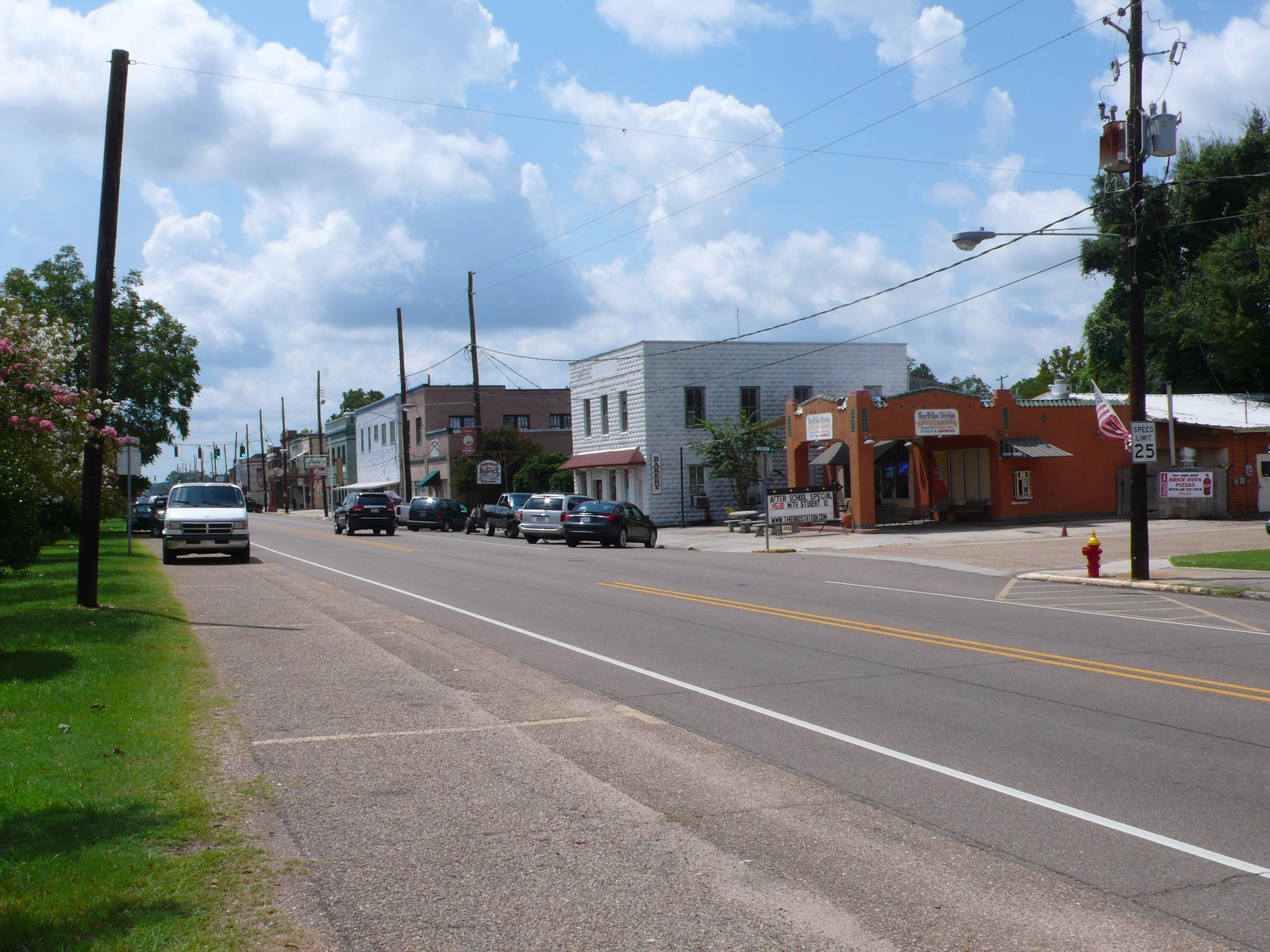
- US Route 51 in Independence

- Location of Independence in Tangipahoa Parish, Louisiana.

- Location of Louisiana in the United States
- Coordinates: 30°38′07″N 90°30′14″W
- Country: United States
- State: Louisiana
- Parish: Tangipahoa

Government
  - Mayor: Jim Paine

Area
  - Total: 2.41 sq mi (6.25 km^{2})
  - Land: 2.41 sq mi (6.24 km^{2})
  - Water: 0 sq mi (0.00 km^{2})
- Elevation: 82 ft (25 m)

Population (2020)
  - Total: 1,635
  - Density: 678.2/sq mi (261.86/km^{2})
- Time zone: UTC-6 (CST)
  - Summer (DST): UTC-5 (CDT)
- ZIP code: 70792
- Area code: 985
- FIPS code: 22-37025
- GNIS feature ID: 2405882
- Website: Official website

Independence, originally known as Uncle Sam, is a town in Tangipahoa Parish, Louisiana, United States. The population was 1,665 at the 2010 census. It is part of the Hammond MSA.

== History ==
The move to establish Independence as a town was led in the early 20th century by State Representative Harry D. Wilson, who subsequently served from 1916 until his death early in 1948 as the Louisiana Commissioner of Agriculture and Forestry. Wilson was a son of Dr. and Mrs. William D. Wilson. In 1856, Dr. Wilson had built a store in Independence, which remained for years the oldest building in the community. Harry Wilson worked in the parish seat of Amite in the general store of the merchant Jacob Stern at a time when Tangipahoa Parish did not yet depend on the strawberry crop. During the 1890s, Wilson was an express messenger for the Illinois Central Railroad. He left that position to pursue a political career.

Affectionately known by voters as "Uncle Harry" or "Mister Harry", Wilson served two nonconsecutive terms in the state House from 1900 to 1904 and again from 1908 to 1912. A strong promoter of his hometown of Independence, located five miles to the south of Amite, Wilson in 1902 and 1903 corresponded with Governor William Wright Heard regarding incorporation of the community, which at the time had a population of 308. Governor Heard informed Wilson that he considered the three square miles proposed for the new town as too much land for a small village and suggested that the tract be reduced in size. Originally named "Uncle Sam", Independence had begun in 1852 when the New Orleans, Jackson and Great Northern Railroad began operating through the area. Independence was finally proclaimed a town on August 22, 1912.

== Geography ==
According to the United States Census Bureau, the town has a total area of 2.2 square miles (5.7 km^{2}), all land.

== Demographics ==
Historical population
Census	Pop.	Note	%±
1880	68		—
1910	1,004		—
1920	1,032		2.8%
1930	1,700		64.7%
1940	1,498		−11.9%
1950	1,606		7.2%
1960	1,941		20.9%
1970	1,770		−8.8%
1980	1,684		−4.9%
1990	1,632		−3.1%
2000	1,724		5.6%
2010	1,665		−3.4%
2020	1,635		−1.8%
2025 (est.)	1,665	▲	1.8%
U.S. Decennial Census

Independence racial composition as of 2020
Race	Number	Percentage
White (non-Hispanic)	732	44.77%
Black or African American (non-Hispanic)	768	46.97%
Native American	3	0.18%
Asian	8	0.49%
Other/Mixed	48	2.94%
Hispanic or Latino	76	4.65%

As of the 2020 United States census, there were 1,635 people, 711 households, and 492 families residing in the town.

== Arts and culture ==
Independence has a large Italian-American community, as do neighboring towns and villages. Independence has a Sicilian heritage festival every year the second weekend in March. Independence has sometimes been referred to colloquially as Little Italy, and Italian expatriates began settling here as early as the 19th Century.

Many attributes of the Italian culture, including food, in Independence are described in Italian Culture in Independence. Other useful resources are Southeastern Louisiana University's Center for Regional Studies and the Tangipahoa Parish tourist information center.

== Education ==
Tangipahoa Parish School Board operates public schools:

- Independence High Magnet School
- Independence Leadership Academy

== Notable people ==
- Nick Bruno, President of the University of Louisiana at Monroe
- Robert Crais, best-selling novelist
- Steven Jyles, a Canadian Football League quarterback
- Frank Lockett, former NFL wide receiver for the Miami Dolphins
- Clif Richardson, former state representative
- LaBrandon Toefield, former LSU star runningback and NFL runningback for the Jacksonville Jaguars and Carolina Panthers
