= Tickfaw, Louisiana =

- Village
- Village of Tickfaw
- Location of Tickfaw in Tangipahoa Parish, Louisiana.

- Location of Louisiana in the United States
- Coordinates: 30°34′37″N 90°29′44″W
- Country: United States
- State: Louisiana
- Parish: Tangipahoa
- Founded: 1852

Area
  - Total: 1.61 sq mi (4.18 km^{2})
  - Land: 1.61 sq mi (4.18 km^{2})
  - Water: 0 sq mi (0.00 km^{2})
- Elevation: 62 ft (19 m)

Population (2020)
  - Total: 635
  - Density: 393.6/sq mi (151.96/km^{2})
- Time zone: UTC-6 (CST)
  - Summer (DST): UTC-5 (CDT)
- ZIP code: 70466
- Area code: 985
- FIPS code: 22-75670
- GNIS feature ID: 2407561
- Website: www.villageoftickfaw.com

Tickfaw was founded in 1852 and is a village in Tangipahoa Parish, Louisiana, United States. As of the 2020 census, Tickfaw had a population of 635. Tickfaw is part of the Hammond MSA. It was originally inhabited by Italian-American immigrants and continues to have a distinct Italian-American heritage.

== History ==
The Village was incorporated in 1957 under the leadership of Joe Greco, who later became the first Mayor. The governing body consists of the Mayor, the Board of Aldermen and an elected Chief of Police.

== Geography ==
According to the United States Census Bureau, the village has a total area of 1.6 square miles (4.1 km^{2}), all land.

== Demographics ==
Historical population
Census	Pop.	Note	%±
1880	73		—
1960	317		—
1970	370		16.7%
1980	571		54.3%
1990	565		−1.1%
2000	617		9.2%
2010	694		12.5%
2020	635		−8.5%
2025 (est.)	691	▲	8.8%
U.S. Decennial Census

Tickfaw racial composition as of 2020
	Number	Percentage
White (non-Hispanic)	425	66.93%
Black or African American (non-Hispanic)	115	18.11%
Native American	5	0.79%
Asian	10	1.57%
Other/Mixed	25	3.94%
Hispanic or Latino	55	8.66%

As of the 2020 United States census, there were 635 people, 257 households, and 187 families residing in the village.

== Notable people ==
- Robert Billiot, Democratic member of the Louisiana House of Representatives for Jefferson Parish since 2008
- Kim Mulkey, head coach, LSU Tigers basketball; Women's Basketball Hall of Fame inductee as both player and coach
