= Washington Parish, Louisiana =

Parish in Louisiana, United States

Coordinates: 30.85°N 90.04°W

- Parish
- Parish of Washington; Paroisse de Washington (French); Parroquia de Washington (French)
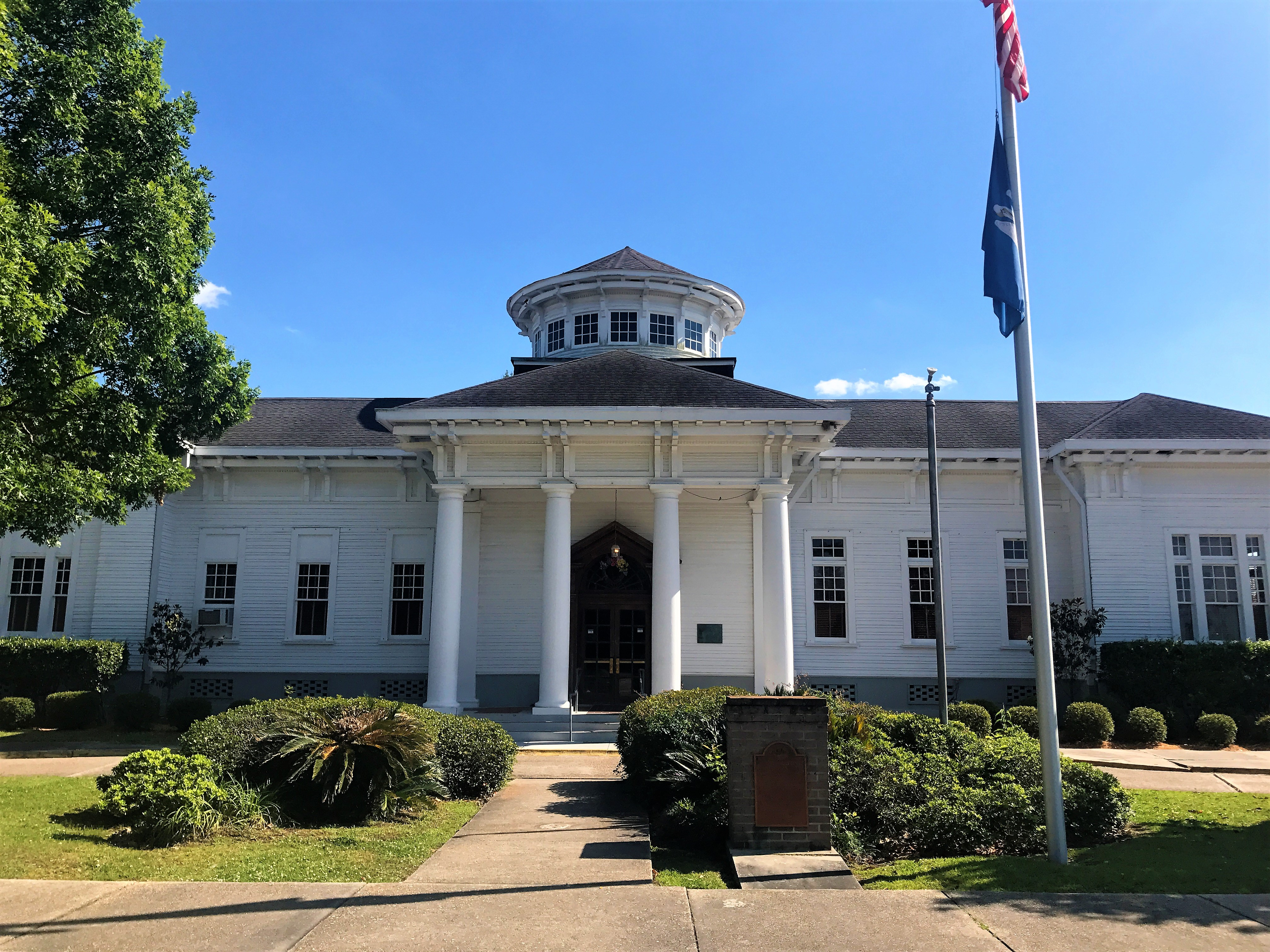
- Bogalusa City Hall

- Seal

- Location within the U.S. state of Louisiana

- Louisiana's location within the U.S.
- Country: United States
- State: Louisiana
- Region: Florida Parishes
- Founded: 1819
- Named for: George Washington
- Parish seat: Franklinton
- Largest city: Bogalusa

Area
  - Total: 676 sq mi (1,750 km^{2})
  - Land: 670 sq mi (1,700 km^{2})
  - Water: 6.4 sq mi (17 km^{2})
  - percentage: 0.9 sq mi (2.3 km^{2})

Population (2020)
  - Total: 45,463
  - Estimate (2025): 44,937 ▼
  - Rank: LA: 24th
  - Density: 68/sq mi (26/km^{2})
- Time zone: UTC-6 (CST)
  - Summer (DST): UTC-5 (CDT)
- Area code: 985
- Congressional district: 5th
- Website: https://www.wpgov.org/

Washington Parish (French: Paroisse de Washington; Spanish: Parroquia de Washington) is a parish located in the interior southeast corner of the U.S. state of Louisiana, one of the Florida Parishes. As of the 2020 census, the population was 45,463. Its parish seat is Franklinton. Its largest city is Bogalusa. The parish was founded in 1819 and is named for President George Washington.

Washington Parish comprises the Bogalusa, LA micropolitan statistical area, which is included in the New Orleans-Metairie-Hammond, LA-MS combined statistical area.

== History ==
Washington Parish was formed in 1819 by splitting off from St. Tammany Parish. Franklinton was designated as the parish seat on February 10, 1821.

Washington Parish is the most northeasterly of what are called the Florida Parishes. Great Britain took over control of this French territory east of the Mississippi River in 1763 after defeating France in the Seven Years' War. But France had also ceded some territory to Spain. This area was under contention, and English and American settlers tried to set up an independent state here in 1810. The United States annexed the territory, later settling with Spain in a treaty. Through much of this period, the French influence remained strong in the region, especially in its former colonial cities.

This area was rural and forested with virgin longleaf pine (Pinus palustris L.) In the early 20th century, entrepreneurial brothers Frank and Charles W. Goodyear, already successful businessmen from Buffalo, New York, purchased hundreds of thousands of acres of forest in this area and in southwestern Mississippi. They established the Great Southern Lumber Company, constructed a huge sawmill (the largest in the world at the time) in the middle of the forest, and developed Bogalusa, Louisiana, as a company mill town. In the early 20th century, there were numerous confrontations as workers attempted to unionize and companies hired private militia to suppress such activities.

The company housing for workers was divided by Jim Crow custom and state laws on racial segregation into sections for "Americans" and another for "colored" and foreign workers. It also built housing for supervisors, and supporting facilities, such as several hotels, churches, a YMCA and YWCA, schools, and other services within a year, opening facilities in 1907. To access the timber and transport processed lumber from the mill to markets, the company built the New Orleans Great Northern Railroad, connecting Bogalusa to the port of New Orleans.

Well before World War II, the virgin forest was harvested. Great Southern Lumber Company closed the sawmill in 1938. Its paper mill and chemical operations continued. Gradually in the late 20th century, these operations declined. As jobs left, the population dropped in such industrial towns. Some people moved to new or emerging industries in New Orleans and other major cities.

== Geography ==
According to the U.S. Census Bureau, the parish has a total area of 676 square miles (1,750 km^{2}), of which 670 square miles (1,700 km^{2}) is land and 6.4 square miles (17 km^{2}) (0.9%) is water.

=== Adjacent counties and parishes ===
- Pike County, Mississippi (northwest)
- Walthall County, Mississippi (north)
- Marion County, Mississippi (northeast)
- Pearl River County, Mississippi (east)
- St. Tammany Parish (south)
- Tangipahoa Parish (west)

=== Major highways ===
- Louisiana Highway 10
- Louisiana Highway 16
- Louisiana Highway 21
- Louisiana Highway 25
- Louisiana Highway 38
- Louisiana Highway 60
- Louisiana Highway 62
- Louisiana Highway 424
- Louisiana Highway 430
- Louisiana Highway 436
  - Louisiana Highway 436-1
- Louisiana Highway 437
- Louisiana Highway 438
- Louisiana Highway 439
- Louisiana Highway 440
- Louisiana Highway 450
- Louisiana Highway 1055
- Louisiana Highway 1056
- Louisiana Highway 1057
- Louisiana Highway 1069
- Louisiana Highway 1070
- Louisiana Highway 1071
- Louisiana Highway 1072
- Louisiana Highway 1073
- Louisiana Highway 1074
- Louisiana Highway 1075
- Louisiana Highway 3124

=== National protected area ===
- Bogue Chitto National Wildlife Refuge (part)

=== State park ===
- Bogue Chitto State Park

== Communities ==
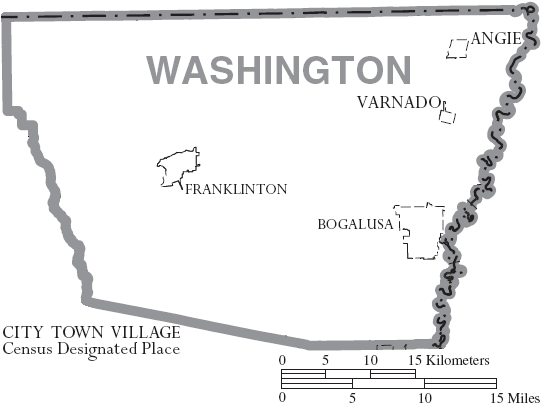
Map of Washington Parish, Louisiana With Municipal Labels

=== City ===
- Bogalusa (largest municipality)

=== Town ===
- Franklinton (parish seat)

=== Villages ===
- Angie
- Varnado

=== Census-designated place ===
- Rio

=== Unincorporated communities ===
- Enon
- Mount Hermon
- Pine
- Thomas
- Warnerton

== Demographics ==
Historical population
Census	Pop.	Note	%±
1820	2,517		—
1830	2,286		−9.2%
1840	2,649		15.9%
1850	3,408		28.7%
1860	4,708		38.1%
1870	3,330		−29.3%
1880	5,190		55.9%
1890	6,700		29.1%
1900	9,628		43.7%
1910	18,886		96.2%
1920	24,164		27.9%
1930	29,904		23.8%
1940	34,443		15.2%
1950	38,371		11.4%
1960	44,015		14.7%
1970	41,987		−4.6%
1980	44,207		5.3%
1990	43,185		−2.3%
2000	43,926		1.7%
2010	47,168		7.4%
2020	45,463		−3.6%
2025 (est.)	44,937	▼	−1.2%
U.S. Decennial Census; 1790-1960 1900-1990; 1990-2000 2010

Washington Parish, Louisiana – Racial and ethnic composition Note: the US Census treats Hispanic/Latino as an ethnic category. This table excludes Latinos from the racial categories and assigns them to a separate category. Hispanics/Latinos may be of any race.
Race / Ethnicity (NH = Non-Hispanic)	Pop 1980	Pop 1990	Pop 2000	Pop 2010	Pop 2020	% 1980	% 1990	% 2000	% 2010	% 2020
White alone (NH)	30,508	29,526	29,396	31,019	29,588	69.01%	68.37%	66.92%	65.76%	65.08%
Black or African American alone (NH)	13,141	13,314	13,781	14,561	12,758	29.73%	30.83%	31.37%	30.87%	28.06%
Native American or Alaska Native alone (NH)	29	58	99	121	134	0.07%	0.13%	0.23%	0.26%	0.29%
Asian alone (NH)	87	48	71	108	161	0.20%	0.11%	0.16%	0.23%	0.35%
Native Hawaiian or Pacific Islander alone (NH)	x	x	1	3	0	x	x	0.00%	0.01%	0.00%
Other race alone (NH)	9	0	21	14	80	0.02%	0.00%	0.05%	0.03%	0.18%
Mixed race or Multiracial (NH)	x	x	223	455	1,332	x	x	0.51%	0.96%	2.93%
Hispanic or Latino (any race)	433	239	334	887	1,410	0.98%	0.55%	0.76%	1.88%	3.10%
Total	44,207	43,185	43,926	47,168	45,463	100.00%	100.00%	100.00%	100.00%	100.00%

At the 2020 United States census, there were 45,463 people, 17,613 households, and 11,924 families residing in the parish. in 2000 there were 43,926 people, 16,467 households, and 11,642 families residing in the parish. The population density was 66 inhabitants per square mile (25/km^{2}). There were 19,106 housing units at an average density of 28 per square mile (11/km^{2}).

In 2000, the racial and ethnic makeup of the parish was 67.42% White, 31.53% Black or African American, 0.23% Native American, 0.17% Asian, 0.11% from other races, and 0.54% from two or more races; 0.76% of the population were Hispanic or Latino of any race. By 2020, its makeup was 65.08% non-Hispanic white, 28.06% Black or African American, 0.29% Native American, 0.35% Asian, 3.11% other or multiracial, and 3.1% Hispanic or Latino of any race.

In 2000, there were 16,467 households, out of which 32.70% had children under the age of 18 living with them, 49.30% were married couples living together, 17.10% had a female householder with no husband present, and 29.30% were non-families. 26.60% of all households were made up of individuals, and 12.50% had someone living alone who was 65 years of age or older. The average household size was 2.56 and the average family size was 3.09.

In the parish the population was spread out, with 26.80% under the age of 18, 9.50% from 18 to 24, 26.70% from 25 to 44, 22.60% from 45 to 64, and 14.30% who were 65 years of age or older. The median age was 36 years. For every 100 females there were 95.40 males. For every 100 females age 18 and over, there were 92.80 males.

At the 2000 census, the median income for a household in the parish was $24,264, and the median income for a family was $29,480. Males had a median income of $27,964 versus $17,709 for females. The per capita income for the parish was $12,915. About 19.40% of families and 24.70% of the population were below the poverty line, including 32.20% of those under age 18 and 20.40% of those age 65 or over. Washington Parish has the second highest level of poverty in the state after Orleans Parish.

== Economy ==
Washington Parish is currently known for its agriculture, particularly watermelons. Through much of the 20th century, its economy was based on its timber and paper industry.

In 1906, The Great Southern Lumber Company, founded by the Goodyear brothers from New York, purchased huge tracts of forest and established a sawmill in Bogalusa to harvest the local virgin pine forests. This company was the first to introduce reforestation in order to sustain the timber industry locally. Taken over by Crown Zellerbach, it later started a paper mill and chemical businesses in the area.

The local business passed through several hands as the lumber and related industries restructured through the late 20th century. In the 21st century, Temple-Inland Corporation is the largest employer in the parish.

== Education ==
Students residing outside of Ward 4, most of the parish, attend Washington Parish School System. Students within Ward 4 attend Bogalusa City Schools. The Bogalusa district serves the City of Bogalusa, Rio, and some unincorporated areas.

Northshore Technical Community College is located in Bogalusa.

== Politics ==
United States presidential election results for Washington Parish, Louisiana
Year	Republican		Democratic		Third party(ies)	
Year	No.	%	No.	%	No.	%
1912	18	3.05%	491	83.08%	82	13.87%
1916	66	5.62%	1,094	93.19%	14	1.19%
1920	165	13.11%	1,094	86.89%	0	0.00%
1924	179	10.87%	1,278	77.64%	189	11.48%
1928	1,528	43.07%	2,020	56.93%	0	0.00%
1932	283	6.61%	3,997	93.37%	1	0.02%
1936	350	5.82%	5,667	94.18%	0	0.00%
1940	314	4.92%	6,062	95.08%	0	0.00%
1944	406	7.78%	4,810	92.22%	0	0.00%
1948	371	4.76%	3,267	41.88%	4,163	53.36%
1952	2,432	24.69%	7,420	75.31%	0	0.00%
1956	3,081	38.29%	4,658	57.88%	308	3.83%
1960	1,847	16.20%	5,678	49.81%	3,875	33.99%
1964	7,438	60.65%	4,825	39.35%	0	0.00%
1968	1,695	10.78%	3,021	19.22%	11,002	70.00%
1972	8,162	66.92%	2,947	24.16%	1,087	8.91%
1976	5,677	35.32%	10,000	62.22%	396	2.46%
1980	8,681	44.58%	10,413	53.48%	378	1.94%
1984	11,185	58.91%	7,680	40.45%	123	0.65%
1988	9,374	51.81%	8,369	46.25%	351	1.94%
1992	7,227	38.54%	9,095	48.50%	2,431	12.96%
1996	6,642	36.85%	9,603	53.28%	1,778	9.87%
2000	8,983	53.19%	7,399	43.81%	505	2.99%
2004	11,006	61.69%	6,554	36.74%	281	1.58%
2008	12,215	65.59%	6,122	32.87%	287	1.54%
2012	11,798	63.49%	6,466	34.80%	317	1.71%
2016	12,556	67.40%	5,692	30.56%	380	2.04%
2020	13,307	68.20%	5,970	30.59%	236	1.21%
2024	12,846	69.61%	5,411	29.32%	198	1.07%

== Corrections ==
Louisiana Department of Public Safety and Corrections operates the B.B. "Sixty" Rayburn Correctional Center near the village of Varnado, LA.

== National Guard ==
Bogalusa is home to the headquarters of the 205th Engineer Battalion of the 225th Engineer Brigade. Franklinton is the home of the 843rd Engineer Company.

== Notable people ==
- Oneal Moore (1931–1965), US Army veteran and first African-American deputy sheriff in Washington Parish Sheriff's Office; murdered while in uniform in a drive-by shooting, June 2, 1965. Case never solved.
- Weldon Russell (born 1946), former state representative for Tangipahoa and St. Helena parishes; born in Washington Parish
- Malinda Brumfield White (born 1967), state representative for Washington and St. Tammany parishes, effective 2016
- Katherine Haik (born 2000), from Franklinton, named Miss Teen USA 2015 at the age of fifteen
- JayDaYoungan (1998–2022) Bogalusa native and rapper most well known for his song 23 island. He was gunned down in 2022 by five unknown assailants.

== See also ==
- National Register of Historic Places listings in Washington Parish, Louisiana
- Bogue Chitto State Park

== Sources ==
- "Washington Parish, Louisiana" by Janice M. Berfield, 1968
- "History of Washington Parish", by Hon. Prentiss B. Carter
- Bogalusa Story, by C. W. Goodyear
- Bogalusa, Washington Parish, Louisiana: History, Links, Maps, and Photos
- Bogalusa Daily News
