= List of state highways in Louisiana (400–449) =

The following is a list of state highways in the U.S. state of Louisiana designated in the 400-449 range.

== Louisiana Highway 400 ==
Louisiana Highway 400
- Location: Assumption Parish
- Length: 5.746 mi (9.247 km)
- Existed: 1955–present

Louisiana Highway 400 (LA 400) runs 5.75 miles (9.25 km) in an east–west direction from a local road northeast of Attakapas Landing to LA 1 north of Supreme, Assumption Parish.

From the west, LA 400 begins at the east end of a bridge across the Cancienne Canal. It continues the path of a local road that begins at a junction with LA 401 just north of Attakapas Landing on Lake Verret. LA 400 heads eastward and intersects LA 1011 and LA 1010 before ending at a junction with LA 1 opposite Bayou Lafourche. LA 400 is an undivided two-lane highway for its entire length.

The entire highway is in Assumption Parish.

Location	mi	km	Destinations	Notes
	0.000	0.000	Begin state maintenance at Cancienne Canal bridge	Western terminus
	1.737	2.795	LA 1011	Western terminus of LA 1011
Percle	4.218	6.788	LA 1010	
	5.746	9.247	LA 1 – Napoleonville, Thibodaux	Eastern terminus
1.000 mi = 1.609 km; 1.000 km = 0.621 mi

== Louisiana Highway 401 ==
Louisiana Highway 401
- Location: Attakapas Landing–Napoleonville
- Length: 9.407 mi (15.139 km)
- Existed: 1955–present

Louisiana Highway 401 (LA 401) runs 9.41 miles (15.14 km) in a southwest to northeast direction from a dead end at Lake Verret in Attakapas Landing to a junction with LA 1 in Napoleonville, Assumption Parish. The route's mileposts increase from the eastern end contrary to common practice.

The entire highway is in Assumption Parish.

Location	mi	km	Destinations	Notes
Attakapas Landing	9.407	15.139	Dead end at Lake Verret	Western terminus
	1.937	3.117	LA 1006	Southern terminus of LA 1006
Napoleonville	0.000	0.000	LA 1 – Donaldsonville, Thibodaux	Eastern terminus
1.000 mi = 1.609 km; 1.000 km = 0.621 mi

== Louisiana Highway 402 ==
Louisiana Highway 402
- Location: Assumption Parish
- Length: 5.070 mi (8.159 km)
- Existed: 1955–present

Louisiana Highway 402 (LA 402) runs 5.07 miles (8.16 km) in an east–west direction from a local road west of Brusle St. Vincent to LA 308 north of Napoleonville, Assumption Parish. The route's mileposts increase from the eastern end contrary to common practice.

The entire highway is in Assumption Parish.

Location	mi	km	Destinations	Notes
	5.070	8.159	Begin state maintenance	Western terminus
Brusle St. Vincent	2.530	4.072	LA 403	Southern terminus of LA 403
	1.452	2.337	LA 1006	Northern terminus of LA 1006
Munsons	0.068	0.109	LA 1 – Napoleonville, Donaldsonville	
	0.017– 0.053	0.027– 0.085	Bridge over Bayou Lafourche	
	0.000	0.000	LA 308 – Napoleonville, Donaldsonville	Eastern terminus
1.000 mi = 1.609 km; 1.000 km = 0.621 mi

== Louisiana Highway 403 ==
Louisiana Highway 403
- Location: Brusle St. Vincent–Paincourtville
- Length: 2.878 mi (4.632 km)
- Existed: 1955–present

Louisiana Highway 403 (LA 403) runs 2.88 miles (4.63 km) in a north–south direction from LA 402 at Brusle St. Vincent to LA 308 at Paincourtville, Assumption Parish.

The entire highway is in Assumption Parish.

Location	mi	km	Destinations	Notes
Brusle St. Vincent	0.000	0.000	LA 402	Southern terminus
	0.552	0.888	LA 1004	Southern terminus of LA 1004
Paincourtville	2.800	4.506	LA 1 – Donaldsonville, Napoleonville	
Paincourtville	2.807– 2.853	4.517– 4.591	Bridge over Bayou Lafourche	
Paincourtville	2.878	4.632	LA 308 – Donaldsonville, Napoleonville	Northern terminus
1.000 mi = 1.609 km; 1.000 km = 0.621 mi

== Louisiana Highway 404 ==
Louisiana Highway 404
- Location: Choctaw–Samstown
- Length: 8.230 mi (13.245 km)
- Existed: 1955–present

Louisiana Highway 404 (LA 404) runs 8.23 miles (13.24 km) in an east–west direction from LA 75 at Choctaw to LA 69 at Samstown, Iberville Parish. The route's mileposts increase from the eastern end contrary to common practice.

The entire highway is in Iberville Parish.

Location	mi	km	Destinations	Notes
Choctaw	8.230	13.245	LA 75 – Bayou Pigeon, Bayou Sorrel	Western terminus
	2.000	3.219	LA 993 (Richland Road)	
	1.577	2.538	LA 3001	Eastern terminus of LA 3001
Samstown	0.000	0.000	LA 69 – White Castle, Grand Bayou	Eastern terminus
1.000 mi = 1.609 km; 1.000 km = 0.621 mi

== Louisiana Highway 405 ==
Louisiana Highway 405
- Location: McCall–Plaquemine
- Length: 29.346 mi (47.228 km)
- Existed: 1955–present

Louisiana Highway 405 (LA 405) runs 29.35 miles (47.23 km) in a general north–south direction from LA 1 west of Donaldsonville, Ascension Parish to the junction of LA 1 and LA 75 in Plaquemine, Iberville Parish.

Parish	Location	mi	km	Destinations	Notes
Ascension	McCall	0.000	0.000	LA 1 – Donaldsonville, White Castle	Southern terminus
Iberville		12.436– 12.567	20.014– 20.225	LA 3075	Southern terminus of LA 3075 (not signed)
Iberville	White Castle	14.313	23.035	LA 69 south (Bowie Street)	South end of LA 69 concurrency
Iberville		14.796	23.812	LA 993 (Richland Road)	Northern terminus of LA 993
Iberville	Bayou Goula	17.358	27.935	LA 69 north (Augusta Road)	North end of LA 69 concurrency
Iberville	Plaquemine	29.185	46.969	LA 75 east – Plaquemine Ferry	South end of LA 75 concurrency
Iberville	Plaquemine	29.250– 29.346	47.073– 47.228	LA 1 (Church Street, Eden Street) LA 75 west (Belleview Road)	Northern terminus; north end of LA 75 concurrency; one-way couplet on LA 1
1.000 mi = 1.609 km; 1.000 km = 0.621 mi: Concurrency terminus

== Louisiana Highway 406 ==
Louisiana Highway 406
- Location: Belle Chasse–Stanton
- Length: 6.002 mi (9.659 km)
- Existed: 1955–present

Louisiana Highway 406 (LA 406) runs 6.00 miles (9.66 km) in a north–south direction from LA 23 in Belle Chasse, Plaquemines Parish to the junction of two local roads in New Orleans, Orleans Parish. It provides access to the Woodland Bridge across the Gulf Intracoastal Waterway for Belle Chasse and an area of New Orleans known as the Algiers Lower Coast.

LA 406 heads north from LA 23 (Belle Chasse Highway) in Belle Chasse. Traveling along Woodland Highway, the route passes a series of newer residential subdivisions. The roadway curves to the northeast, traversing a corner of Orleans Parish, and passes a small cluster of industrial facilities located alongside the Gulf Intracoastal Waterway. LA 406 proceeds straight ahead and crosses from Plaquemines Parish again into Orleans Parish, simultaneously re-entering the New Orleans city limits. After crossing underneath the Woodland Bridge, LA 406 engages in a roundabout with LA 407, which loops around onto the bridge and across the waterway. The highway then passes the entrance to the upscale English Turn residential community and country club. LA 406 curves due east onto Patterson Drive (also known as River Road) along the Mississippi River levee and proceeds to an intersection with Stanton Road. River Road continues as a local road until reaching the U.S. Coast Guard station three miles (4.8 km) later.

Parish	Location	mi	km	Destinations	Notes
Plaquemines	Belle Chasse	0.000– 0.077	0.000– 0.124	LA 23 (Belle Chasse Highway)	Southern terminus
Orleans	No major junctions				
Plaquemines	No major junctions				
Orleans	New Orleans	3.226– 3.372	5.192– 5.427	LA 407 north (Woodland Bridge) – New Orleans	Southern terminus of LA 407; roundabout
Orleans	New Orleans	6.002	9.659	River Road / Stanton Road	Northern terminus; location also known as Stanton
1.000 mi = 1.609 km; 1.000 km = 0.621 mi

== Louisiana Highway 407 ==
Louisiana Highway 407
- Location: New Orleans
- Length: 2.556 mi (4.113 km)
- Existed: 1955–present

Louisiana Highway 407 (LA 407) runs 2.56 miles (4.12 km) in a north–south direction from LA 406 to LA 428 in New Orleans, Orleans Parish. The route connects General de Gaulle Drive, a major thoroughfare through the Algiers area of the city, with LA 406 via the Woodland Bridge across the Gulf Intracoastal Waterway.

LA 407 begins at a roundabout junction with LA 406 (Woodland Highway) near the English Turn residential subdivision in the Lower Coast Algiers area of New Orleans. The divided four-lane highway loops to the north and proceeds across the high-level Woodland Bridge over the Gulf Intracoastal Waterway, located along the Orleans–Plaquemines parish line. Returning to grade, LA 407 intersects General de Gaulle Drive, which continues ahead through Algiers toward the Crescent City Connection bridge spanning the Mississippi River in Downtown New Orleans. LA 407 turns north from this junction onto Woodland Drive and narrows to an undivided four-lane highway. The route continues in this capacity through the residential Old Aurora neighborhood until reaching an intersection with LA 428 (General Meyer Avenue).

Parish	Location	mi	km	Destinations	Notes
Orleans	New Orleans	0.000– 0.078	0.000– 0.126	LA 406 (Woodland Highway) – English Turn, Belle Chasse	Southern terminus; roundabout
Orleans–Plaquemines parish line	New Orleans–Belle Chasse line	0.212– 1.151	0.341– 1.852	Woodland Bridge over Gulf Intracoastal Waterway	
Orleans	New Orleans	1.286– 1.321	2.070– 2.126	General de Gaulle Drive – Mississippi River Bridge	
Orleans	New Orleans	2.556	4.113	LA 428 (General Meyer Avenue)	Northern terminus of LA 407; eastern terminus of LA 428
1.000 mi = 1.609 km; 1.000 km = 0.621 mi

== Louisiana Highway 408 ==
Louisiana Highway 408
- Location: Baton Rouge–Greenwell Springs
- Length: 12.281 mi (19.764 km)
- Existed: 1955–present

Louisiana Highway 408 (LA 408) runs 12.28 miles (19.76 km) in an east–west direction from a local road in Baton Rouge to a junction with the concurrent LA 37/LA 64 in Central, East Baton Rouge Parish. The route connects northern Baton Rouge with Greenwell Springs, a rural community within the Central city limits.

LA 408 begins on Harding Boulevard at the west end of the Canadian National Railway/Kansas City Southern Railway overpass alongside the Southern University campus. This terminus is located in an area within the Baton Rouge city limits known as Scotlandville. LA 408 heads east across the overpass as a divided four-lane highway and intersects US 61 (Scenic Highway). Several blocks later, the highway passes through an interchange with I-110 at exit 6, connecting to Downtown Baton Rouge and Natchez, Mississippi. Jutting out from this junction is Veterans Memorial Boulevard, a local road that provides access to Baton Rouge Metropolitan Airport. After passing along the south side of the airport, LA 408 crosses LA 67 (Plank Road), and the local name changes from Harding Boulevard to Hooper Road. 3.2 miles (5.1 km) after exiting the Baton Rouge city limits, LA 408 crosses the Comite River into the suburban city of Central. Over the next 3.3 miles (5.3 km) are junctions with LA 410 (Blackwater Road), LA 946 (Joor Road), and LA 3034 (Sullivan Road). During this stretch, LA 408 narrows to an undivided two-lane highway. It continues northeast in this capacity until reaching a junction with LA 37/LA 64 (Greenwell Springs Road), which parallels the Amite River.

The entire highway is in East Baton Rouge Parish.

Location	mi	km	Destinations	Notes
Baton Rouge	0.000	0.000	Begin state maintenance on Harding Boulevard at CN/KCS railroad overpass	Western terminus
Baton Rouge	0.280– 0.359	0.451– 0.578	US 61 (Scenic Highway) – Baton Rouge, Natchez	Location also known as Scotlandville
Baton Rouge	1.219– 1.489	1.962– 2.396	I-110 – Baton Rouge, Natchez; Veterans Memorial Boulevard – Metro Airport	Exit 6 on I-110
Baton Rouge	2.335– 2.376	3.758– 3.824	LA 67 (Plank Road)	Location also known as Howell
Central	5.538– 5.600	8.913– 9.012	Bridge over Comite River	
Central	6.028	9.701	LA 410 (Blackwater Road)	Southern terminus of LA 410
Central	8.238	13.258	LA 946 (Joor Road)	Northern terminus of LA 946
Central	9.346	15.041	LA 3034 (Sullivan Road)	Western terminus of LA 3034
Central	12.281	19.764	LA 37 / LA 64 (Greenwell Springs Road)	Eastern terminus; location also known as Greenwell Springs
1.000 mi = 1.609 km; 1.000 km = 0.621 mi

== Louisiana Highway 409 ==
Louisiana Highway 409
- Location: Indian Mound–Blairstown
- Length: 11.256 mi (18.115 km)
- Existed: 1955–present

Louisiana Highway 409 (LA 409) runs 11.26 miles (18.12 km) in a north–south direction from LA 64 in Central, East Baton Rouge Parish to LA 959 at Blairstown, East Feliciana Parish.

LA 409 heads north on Liberty Road from a T-intersection with LA 64 in area within the Central city limits known as Indian Mound. The highway travels about 6.7 miles (10.8 km) to the community of Pride, where it curves east onto Pride-Baywood Road then turns north onto Riley Road. North of Pride, LA 409 crosses from East Baton Rouge Parish into East Feliciana Parish and proceeds to a junction with LA 959 at Blairstown. LA 409 is an undivided two-lane highway for its entire length. As of 2018, the portion in East Baton Rouge Parish (except for the portion south of Bethel Church) is under agreement to be removed from the state highway system and transferred to local control.

Parish	Location	mi	km	Destinations	Notes
East Baton Rouge	Central	0.000	0.000	LA 64 (Liberty Road, Greenwell Springs-Port Hudson Road) – Greenwell Springs, Zachary	Southern terminus
East Feliciana	Blairstown	11.256	18.115	LA 959 – Blairstown, Bluff Creek	Northern terminus
1.000 mi = 1.609 km; 1.000 km = 0.621 mi

== Louisiana Highway 410 ==
Louisiana Highway 410
- Location: Central
- Length: 8.176 mi (13.158 km)
- Existed: 1955–present

Louisiana Highway 410 (LA 410) runs 8.18 miles (13.16 km) in a north–south direction along Blackwater Road from LA 408 to LA 64 in Central, East Baton Rouge Parish.

The entire highway is in Central, East Baton Rouge Parish.

mi	km	Destinations	Notes
0.000	0.000	LA 408 (Hooper Road)	Southern terminus
8.176	13.158	LA 64 (Greenwell Springs-Port Hudson Road)	Northern terminus; location also known as Deerford
1.000 mi = 1.609 km; 1.000 km = 0.621 mi

== Louisiana Highway 411 ==
Louisiana Highway 411
- Location: Rosedale–Livonia
- Length: 11.515 mi (18.532 km)
- Existed: 1955–present

Louisiana Highway 411 (LA 411) runs 11.52 miles (18.54 km) in a north–south direction from LA 76 in Rosedale, Iberville Parish to the junction of US 190 and LA 78 in Livonia, Pointe Coupee Parish. The route's mileposts increase from the northern end contrary to common practice.

LA 411 heads northwest from LA 76 in Rosedale alongside the east bank of Bayou Grosse Tete. After about six miles (9.7 km), the route passes along the eastern edge of Maringouin, which is accessed by bridge via LA 977. Shortly afterward, the highway crosses from Iberville Parish into Pointe Coupee Parish. LA 411 continues along the bayou until reaching a junction with US 190 (Airline Highway) in Livonia, connecting with the cities of Baton Rouge and Opelousas. LA 78 continues the path of the roadway northward toward New Roads. LA 411 is an undivided two-lane highway for its entire length.

Parish	Location	mi	km	Destinations	Notes
Iberville	Rosedale	11.515	18.532	LA 76 (Rosedale Road) – Ramah, Port Allen	Southern terminus
Iberville		5.564	8.954	LA 977 north – Maringouin	Southern terminus of LA 977
Pointe Coupee	Livonia	0.000	0.000	US 190 (Airline Highway) – Baton Rouge, Opelousas LA 78 north – New Roads	Northern terminus of LA 411; southern terminus of LA 78
1.000 mi = 1.609 km; 1.000 km = 0.621 mi

== Louisiana Highway 412 ==
Louisiana Highway 412
- Location: East Feliciana Parish
- Length: 9.938 mi (15.994 km)
- Existed: 1955–present

Louisiana Highway 412 (LA 412) runs 9.94 miles (16.00 km) in an east–west direction from LA 964 west of Slaughter to LA 67 east of Slaughter, East Feliciana Parish.

The entire highway is in East Feliciana Parish.

Location	mi	km	Destinations	Notes
	0.000	0.000	LA 964 (Old Scenic Highway); LA 955	Western terminus of LA 412; southern terminus of LA 955; west end of LA 955 concurrency
	0.407	0.655	LA 955 north	East end of LA 955 concurrency
Slaughter	5.100	8.208	LA 19 – Zachary, Wilson	
	7.498	12.067	LA 956	Southern terminus of LA 956
	8.635	13.897	LA 957	Southern terminus of LA 957
Olive Branch	9.938	15.994	LA 67 – Zachary, Clinton	Eastern terminus
1.000 mi = 1.609 km; 1.000 km = 0.621 mi: Concurrency terminus

== Louisiana Highway 413 ==
Louisiana Highway 413
- Location: Erwinville–New Roads
- Length: 23.741 mi (38.207 km)
- Existed: 1955–present

Louisiana Highway 413 (LA 413) runs 23.74 miles (38.21 km) in a north–south direction from LA 76 south of Erwinville, West Baton Rouge Parish to LA 1 Bus. in New Roads, Pointe Coupee Parish.

Prior to the 1955 highway number redesignations, the current LA Highway 413 ran along road beds that were parts of LA State Route 73, LA State Route 139, and LA State Route 135 of the old numbering system. The portion of the highway from Rosedale Road that runs north to near False River was the old LA State Route 73 portion. The portion that runs along False River and carries the local name "Island Road" was the old LA State Route 139 portion. The portion of the current highway that runs east-west from near Patin Dyke to New Roads was the old LA State Route 135 portion.

LA 413 heads north on Poydras Bayou Drive from LA 76 (Rosedale Road) in West Baton Rouge Parish. It crosses the concurrent US 190/LA 1 (Airline Highway) in Erwinville. The highway then skirts the Pointe Coupee Parish line for a short time before crossing it at a junction with LA 3091 (Flynn Road). LA 413 makes a brief zigzag onto LA 416 in Lakeland. Shortly afterward, the route turns west at an intersection with LA 414 (Island Road) and makes a long loop alongside False River through Jarreau and Dupont to Ventress. Here, LA 413 meets LA 414 (Ventress Road) a second time and turns north briefly to a junction with LA 415 (Patin Dyke Road) at Patin. The highway turns west once again and enters the city of New Roads, where it terminates at a junction with LA 1 Bus. at the corner of Main and New Roads Streets. LA 413 is an undivided two-lane highway for its entire length.

Parish	Location	mi	km	Destinations	Notes
West Baton Rouge		0.000	0.000	LA 76 (Rosedale Road) to I-10 – Rosedale, Port Allen	Southern terminus
West Baton Rouge	Erwinville	4.243	6.828	US 190 / LA 1 (Airline Highway) – Baton Rouge, Opelousas	
West Baton Rouge		4.723	7.601	LA 620 (Section Road)	Western terminus of LA 620
West Baton Rouge–Pointe Coupee parish line		6.832	10.995	LA 3091 (Flynn Road)	Northern terminus of LA 3091
Pointe Coupee	Lakeland	9.038	14.545	LA 416 east – Rougon	South end of LA 416 concurrency
Pointe Coupee	Lakeland	9.248	14.883	LA 416 west – Lakeland	North end of LA 416 concurrency
Pointe Coupee		9.753	15.696	LA 414 (Island Road)	Southern terminus of LA 414
Pointe Coupee	Ventress	21.515	34.625	LA 414 (Ventress Road)	Northern terminus of LA 414
Pointe Coupee	Patin	22.116	35.592	LA 415 (Patin Dyke Road)	Northern terminus of LA 415
Pointe Coupee	New Roads	23.741	38.207	LA 1 Bus. (Main Street, New Roads Street)	Northern terminus
1.000 mi = 1.609 km; 1.000 km = 0.621 mi: Concurrency terminus

== Louisiana Highway 414 ==
Louisiana Highway 414
- Location: Pointe Coupee Parish
- Length: 10.550 mi (16.979 km)
- Existed: 1955–present

Louisiana Highway 414 (LA 414) runs 10.55 miles (16.98 km) in a general north–south direction from LA 413 north of Lakeland to a second junction with LA 413 at Ventress, Pointe Coupee Parish. The route travels in a loop off of LA 413 around an area between the False River and Mississippi River known as "The Island".

LA 414 heads northeast from LA 413 through Chenal and across the Kansas City Southern Railway line to a junction with LA 415 (River Road) at the Mississippi River levee. The route turns north alongside the levee and travels concurrent with LA 415 for 2.2 miles (3.5 km). LA 414 then turns west and proceeds back across the KCS rail line to its terminus at LA 414 in Ventress. It is an undivided two-lane highway for its entire length.

The entire highway is in Pointe Coupee Parish.

Location	mi	km	Destinations	Notes
	0.000	0.000	LA 413 (Island Road, Zach Road) – Lakeland	Southern terminus
Chenal	1.192	1.918	LA 983 – Rougon	Northern terminus of LA 983
	4.918	7.915	LA 415 south (River Road)	South end of LA 415 concurrency
	7.128	11.471	LA 415 north (River Road)	North end of LA 415 concurrency
Ventress	10.550	16.979	LA 413 (Island Drive, Legion Drive) – New Roads	Northern terminus
1.000 mi = 1.609 km; 1.000 km = 0.621 mi: Concurrency terminus

== Louisiana Highway 415 ==
Louisiana Highway 415
- Location: Port Allen–New Roads
- Length: 25.801 mi (41.523 km)
- Existed: 1955–present

Louisiana Highway 415 (LA 415) runs 25.80 miles (41.52 km) in a north–south direction from I-10 west of Port Allen, West Baton Rouge Parish to LA 413 east of New Roads, Pointe Coupee Parish. The route has a spur that travels 0.48 miles (0.77 km), providing a connection to westbound US 190/LA 1 at Lobdell.

== Louisiana Highway 416 ==
Louisiana Highway 416
- Location: Knapp–Hermitage
- Length: 7.247 mi (11.663 km)
- Existed: 1955–present

Louisiana Highway 416 (LA 416) runs 7.25 miles (11.67 km) in an east–west direction from LA 1 at Knapp to LA 415 at Hermitage, Pointe Coupee Parish. The route's mileposts increase from the eastern end contrary to common practice.

LA 416 heads east from LA 1 through Lakeland, where it intersects LA 413. The road curves northeast through Rougon and briefly overlaps LA 983. At Glynn, LA 416 crosses the Kansas City Southern Railway (KCS) tracks at grade and intersects LA 982. The route continues northeast to a junction with LA 415 in Hermitage at the west bank levee of the Mississippi River. LA 416 is an undivided two-lane highway for its entire length.

The entire highway is in Pointe Coupee Parish.

Location	mi	km	Destinations	Notes
Knapp	7.247– 7.167	11.663– 11.534	LA 1 (Wye Road) – New Roads	Western terminus
Lakeland	5.399	8.689	LA 413 north (Zach Road)	West end of LA 413 concurrency
Lakeland	5.199	8.367	LA 413 south (Poydras Bayou Road)	East end of LA 413 concurrency
	4.445	7.154	LA 983 south	West end of LA 983 concurrency
Rougon	3.803	6.120	LA 983 north	East end of LA 983 concurrency
Glynn	2.035	3.275	LA 982 (Arbroth Road)	Western terminus of LA 982
Hermitage	0.000	0.000	LA 415 (River Road)	Eastern terminus
1.000 mi = 1.609 km; 1.000 km = 0.621 mi: Concurrency terminus

== Louisiana Highway 417 ==
Louisiana Highway 417
- Location: Pointe Coupee Parish
- Length: 24.281 mi (39.076 km)
- Existed: 1955–present

Louisiana Highway 417 (LA 417) runs 24.28 miles (39.07 km) in a north–south direction from LA 10 at Red Cross to LA 418 at Legonier, Pointe Coupee Parish. It exists in two sections, as part of the route between Red Cross and Coon is under local control.

The entire highway is in Pointe Coupee Parish.

Location	mi	km	Destinations	Notes
Red Cross	0.000	0.000	LA 10	Southern terminus
	1.900	3.058	End state maintenance on Coon Road	
Coon Road continues as a local road for 3.491 miles (5.618 km)
Coon	1.900	3.058	Resume state maintenance at Coon Road	
	3.561	5.731	LA 973	Northern terminus of LA 973
Quinton	9.011– 9.041	14.502– 14.550	LA 419	Western terminus of LA 419
	9.960	16.029	LA 418	Southern terminus of LA 418
Jacoby	19.685	31.680	LA 970	Southern terminus of LA 970
Legonier	24.281	39.076	LA 418	Northern terminus
1.000 mi = 1.609 km; 1.000 km = 0.621 mi

== Louisiana Highway 418 ==
Louisiana Highway 418
- Location: Pointe Coupee Parish
- Length: 21.898 mi (35.241 km)
- Existed: 1955–present

Louisiana Highway 418 (LA 418) runs 21.90 miles (35.24 km) in a general north–south direction from LA 417 north of Quinton to LA 1 at Legonier, Pointe Coupee Parish.

The route heads northeast from LA 417 and crosses LA 1 in Innis. It then turns northward alongside the west bank levee of the Mississippi River past Williamsport and the Angola Ferry landing. At Torras, LA 418 curves westward and crosses LA 15 near the Old River Lock. The highway continues along the Lower Old River and Atchafalaya River to a second junction with LA 1 in Legonier at the foot of a bridge connecting to Simmesport. LA 418 is an undivided two-lane highway for its entire length.

The entire highway is in Pointe Coupee Parish.

Location	mi	km	Destinations	Notes
	0.000	0.000	LA 417	Southern terminus
Innis	3.938	6.338	LA 1 (Gayden Road) – Simmesport, Morganza	
Williamsport	5.653	9.098	LA 971	Eastern terminus of LA 971
	9.059– 9.135	14.579– 14.701	LA 3190 – Angola Ferry	Western terminus of LA 3190
Torras	12.978	20.886	LA 15	
	15.378	24.748	LA 970	Northern terminus of LA 970
Legonier	21.580	34.730	LA 417	Northern terminus of LA 417
Legonier	21.898	35.241	LA 1 – Simmesport, Morganza	Northern terminus
1.000 mi = 1.609 km; 1.000 km = 0.621 mi

== Louisiana Highway 419 ==
Louisiana Highway 419
- Location: Pointe Coupee Parish
- Length: 7.359 mi (11.843 km)
- Existed: 1955–present

Louisiana Highway 419 (LA 419) runs 7.36 miles (11.84 km) in an east–west direction from LA 417 at Quinton to the junction of two private roads east of Lacour, Pointe Coupee Parish.

The entire highway is in Pointe Coupee Parish.

Location	mi	km	Destinations	Notes
Quinton	0.000– 0.039	0.000– 0.063	LA 417	Western terminus
Batchelor	2.877	4.630	LA 1 (Gayden Road) – Morganza, Simmesport	
Lacour	6.170	9.930	LA 972	Eastern terminus of LA 972
	7.359	11.843	End state maintenance	Eastern terminus
1.000 mi = 1.609 km; 1.000 km = 0.621 mi

== Louisiana Highway 420 ==
Louisiana Highway 420
- Location: Pointe Coupee Parish
- Length: 7.895 mi (12.706 km)
- Existed: 1955–present

Louisiana Highway 420 (LA 420) runs 7.90 miles (12.71 km) in an east–west direction from the concurrent LA 1/LA 10 east of Morganza to the junction of LA 10 and LA 10 Bus. north of New Roads, Pointe Coupee Parish.

LA 420 initially heads north from LA 1/LA 10 past Pointe Coupee Central High School then reaches the west bank of the Mississippi River and turns eastward. Following the river levee to Pointe Coupee, the highway intersects LA 981. It then turns south a short distance to intersect LA 10. The road continues straight ahead into New Roads as LA 10 Bus. LA 420 is an undivided two-lane highway for its entire length.

The entire highway is in Pointe Coupee Parish.

Location	mi	km	Destinations	Notes
Labarre	0.000	0.000	LA 1 / LA 10 – Morganza, New Roads	Western terminus
Pointe Coupee	7.295	11.740	LA 981 (Ferry Road)	Northern terminus of LA 981
	7.895	12.706	LA 10 – John James Audubon Bridge, Morganza LA 10 Bus. west – New Roads	Eastern terminus of LA 420; eastern terminus of LA 10 Bus.
1.000 mi = 1.609 km; 1.000 km = 0.621 mi

== Louisiana Highway 421 ==
Louisiana Highway 421
- Location: West Feliciana Parish
- Length: 15.821 mi (25.461 km)
- Existed: 1955–present

Louisiana Highway 421 (LA 421) runs 15.82 miles (25.46 km) in a southeast to northwest direction from LA 10 west of Jackson to US 61 north of St. Francisville, West Feliciana Parish.

The entire highway is in West Feliciana Parish.

Location	mi	km	Destinations	Notes
	0.000	0.000	LA 10	Southeastern terminus
	8.893	14.312	LA 967	Southern terminus of LA 967
Wakefield	15.808– 15.821	25.441– 25.461	US 61 – Baton Rouge, Natchez	Northwestern terminus
1.000 mi = 1.609 km; 1.000 km = 0.621 mi

== Louisiana Highway 422 ==
Louisiana Highway 422
- Location: Norwood–Felps
- Length: 12.123 mi (19.510 km)
- Existed: 1955–present

Louisiana Highway 422 (LA 422) runs 12.12 miles (19.51 km) in an east–west direction from LA 19 in Norwood to LA 67 at Felps, East Feliciana Parish.

The route heads east on Oak Street from LA 19 (Main Street) in Norwood. After one block, LA 422 turns south onto Azalea Street and runs parallel to LA 19 for a short distance before resuming an eastward course for the remainder of its route. The highway travels through the northern central portion of the parish, just south of the Mississippi state line. The eastern terminus at Felps is located about 10 miles (16 km) north of Clinton. LA 422 is an undivided two-lane highway for its entire length.

The entire highway is in East Feliciana Parish.

Location	mi	km	Destinations	Notes
Norwood	0.000	0.000	LA 19 (Main Street) – Wilson, Centreville	Western terminus
Felps	12.123	19.510	LA 67 – Clinton, Liberty	Eastern terminus
1.000 mi = 1.609 km; 1.000 km = 0.621 mi

== Louisiana Highway 423 ==
Louisiana Highway 423
- Location: East Baton Rouge Parish
- Length: 2.427 mi (3.906 km)
- Existed: 1955–present

Louisiana Highway 423 (LA 423) runs 2.43 miles (3.91 km) in an east–west direction along Thomas Road from LA 19 to LA 67 between Baton Rouge and Baker in East Baton Rouge Parish. As of 2018, it is under agreement to be removed from the state highway system and transferred to local control.

The entire highway is in East Baton Rouge Parish.

Location	mi	km	Destinations	Notes
Baton Rouge	0.000	0.000	LA 19 (Scotland-Zachary Highway) – Baton Rouge, Zachary	Western terminus
Baker	2.418– 2.427	3.891– 3.906	LA 67 (Plank Road) – Baton Rouge, Clinton	Eastern terminus
1.000 mi = 1.609 km; 1.000 km = 0.621 mi

== Louisiana Highway 424 ==
Louisiana Highway 424
- Location: Washington Parish
- Length: 11.858 mi (19.084 km)
- Existed: 1955–present

Louisiana Highway 424 (LA 424) runs 11.86 miles (19.09 km) in a general east–west direction from LA 62 north of Pine to a second junction with LA 62 north of State Line, Washington Parish.

The entire highway is in Washington Parish.

Location	mi	km	Destinations	Notes
	0.000	0.000	LA 62 – Pine	Southern terminus
	0.435	0.700	LA 1070 north	Southern terminus of LA 1070
Thomas	3.970	6.389	LA 438 – Hackley, State Line	
	11.858	19.084	LA 62 – State Line	Northern terminus
1.000 mi = 1.609 km; 1.000 km = 0.621 mi

== Louisiana Highway 425 ==
Louisiana Highway 425
- Location: East Baton Rouge Parish
- Length: 1.986 mi (3.196 km)
- Existed: 1955–1961

Louisiana Highway 425 (LA 425) ran 1.99 miles (3.20 km) in a north–south direction from LA 30 north of Gardere to LA 427 at Essen, East Baton Rouge Parish.

== Louisiana Highway 426 ==
Louisiana Highway 426
- Location: Baton Rouge
- Length: 7.390 mi (11.893 km)
- Existed: 1955–present

Louisiana Highway 426 (LA 426) runs 7.39 miles (11.89 km) in an east–west direction from LA 73 in Baton Rouge to US 190 between Baton Rouge and Denham Springs. The route is located entirely within East Baton Rouge Parish and is known locally as Old Hammond Highway.

LA 426 heads east from LA 73 (Jefferson Highway) in Baton Rouge as an undivided four-lane highway. It intersects LA 1068 (Drusilla Lane) just before crossing US 61 (Airline Highway), where the roadway widens to include a center turning lane. Shortly before exiting the city limits, LA 426 narrows to two lanes at an intersection with Boulevard de Province. The route proceeds eastward and intersects LA 3245 (O'Neal Lane) before terminating at US 190 (Florida Boulevard) just west of the Amite River.

LA 426 was the original traffic route between Baton Rouge and Denham Springs in the early 20th century. Known as Benton's Ferry Road, it traveled from Jefferson Highway (formerly called Clay Cut Road) to Benton's Ferry on the Amite River near the present location of the US 190 crossing. The ferry service was replaced in 1918 by a bridge (which was in turn replaced by an improved bridge crossing in 1933). The highway was designated as part of State Route 7 in 1921, and it became part of the original alignment of US 190 in 1926. Both designations were removed from the route in 1942 when an extension of Florida Boulevard from Downtown Baton Rouge to the Amite River was completed. The road remained in the state highway system as State Route 7-D until becoming LA 426 in the 1955 Louisiana Highway renumbering.

As of 2018, LA 426 is under agreement to be removed from the state highway system and transferred to local control.

The entire highway is in East Baton Rouge Parish.

Location	mi	km	Destinations	Notes
Baton Rouge	0.000	0.000	LA 73 (Jefferson Highway)	Western terminus
Baton Rouge	1.508	2.427	LA 1068 (Drusilla Lane)	Northern terminus of LA 1068
Baton Rouge	1.703– 1.716	2.741– 2.762	US 61 (Airline Highway)	
	6.516	10.486	LA 3245 (O'Neal Lane)	
	7.378– 7.390	11.874– 11.893	US 190 (Florida Boulevard)	Eastern terminus
1.000 mi = 1.609 km; 1.000 km = 0.621 mi

== Louisiana Highway 427 ==
Louisiana Highway 427
- Location: Baton Rouge–Hope Villa
- Length: 14.574 mi (23.455 km)
- Existed: 1955–present

Louisiana Highway 427 (LA 427) runs 14.57 miles (23.45 km) in a northwest to southeast direction from LA 73 in Baton Rouge, East Baton Rouge Parish to a second junction with LA 73 at Hope Villa, Ascension Parish. It is a busy suburban commercial and residential thoroughfare over most of its route and almost entirely parallels I-10.

LA 427 heads south from LA 73 (Government Street) along South Acadian Thruway as an undivided four-lane highway. After passing through a diamond interchange with I-10 at exit 157B, the route turns southeast onto Perkins Road, gaining a center turning lane, and proceeds out of the Baton Rouge city limits. Intersections with several major thoroughfares connect with the interstate to the northeast, including LA 3064 (Essen Lane), LA 1248 (Bluebonnet Boulevard), and LA 3246 (Siegen Lane). The roadway narrows to two lanes after passing the latter junction and generally remains in that capacity for the remainder of the route. Just before it crosses into Ascension Parish, LA 427 briefly makes a jog onto LA 42 (Highland Road) through a second interchange with I-10 at Kleinpeter. The route then curves to the northeast at LA 928 (Bluff Road) and crosses US 61 (Airline Highway). Shortly afterward, LA 427 terminates at LA 73 (Old Jefferson Highway) south of Hope Villa, within the census-designated boundary of Prairieville. As of 2018, the portion of LA 427 in East Baton Rouge Parish is under agreement to be removed from the state highway system and transferred to local control.

Parish	Location	mi	km	Destinations	Notes
East Baton Rouge	Baton Rouge	0.000– 0.052	0.000– 0.084	LA 73 (Government Street)	Northwestern terminus
East Baton Rouge	Baton Rouge	1.377– 1.501	2.216– 2.416	I-10 – Downtown Baton Rouge, Hammond, New Orleans	Exit 157B on I-10
East Baton Rouge	Baton Rouge	4.869	7.836	LA 3064 east (Essen Lane) to I-10	Western terminus of LA 3064
East Baton Rouge		6.174– 6.183	9.936– 9.951	LA 1248 (Bluebonnet Boulevard)	
East Baton Rouge		7.786	12.530	LA 3246 (Siegen Lane)	
East Baton Rouge		10.957	17.634	LA 42 west (Highland Road)	West end of LA 42 concurrency
East Baton Rouge	0.266-mile (0.428 km) concurrency with LA 42 not counted in official route mileage				
East Baton Rouge				I-10 – Baton Rouge, New Orleans	Exit 166 on I-10
East Baton Rouge	Kleinpeter	10.957	17.634	LA 42 east (Highland Road)	East end of LA 42 concurrency; resume LA 427 mileage
Ascension		13.142	21.150	LA 928 south (Bluff Road) – Dutchtown, St. Gabriel	Northern terminus of LA 928
Ascension	Hope Villa	14.345– 14.356	23.086– 23.104	US 61 (Airline Highway) – Baton Rouge, New Orleans	
Ascension	Hope Villa	14.574	23.455	LA 73 (Old Jefferson Highway)	Southeastern terminus
1.000 mi = 1.609 km; 1.000 km = 0.621 mi: Concurrency terminus

== Louisiana Highway 428 ==
Louisiana Highway 428
- Location: New Orleans
- Length: 8.817 mi (14.190 km)
- Existed: 1955–present

Louisiana Highway 428 (LA 428) runs 8.82 miles (14.19 km) from LA 23 near Belle Chasse to LA 407 in New Orleans. The route travels in an irregular direction and exists in two segments connected by local roads. The portion that travels on General de Gaulle Drive, however, is bannered east–west.

LA 428 begins at a point on LA 23 (Belle Chasse Highway) between Belle Chasse and Gretna near the Jefferson–Plaquemines parish line. It heads north on Behrman Highway, an undivided four-lane thoroughfare with a center turning lane. The highway crosses from Jefferson Parish into an area of New Orleans (co-extensive with Orleans Parish) known as Algiers. Just before the local name changes to Behrman Place, the center lane is replaced by a median, and the route proceeds to an intersection with General de Gaulle Drive. LA 428 turns west onto General de Gaulle Drive, a divided six-lane thoroughfare with a wide right-of-way that includes a drainage canal. The highway engages into a partial cloverleaf interchange with US 90 Bus. (Westbank Expressway). Approaching this junction, the westbound carriageway widens to five lanes to accommodate traffic exiting onto the Crescent City Connection into Downtown New Orleans.

Passing through the interchange, the roadway narrows to a divided four-lane highway, and LA 428 soon crosses back into Jefferson Parish and enters the city of Gretna, where the local name changes to Burmaster Street. LA 428 then turns north onto Franklin Avenue at the northern terminus of LA 23 and remains a divided four-lane highway. The highway re-enters the city of New Orleans for a final time, and the local name changes to Nunez Street. LA 428 crosses underneath the Crescent City Connection on US 90 Bus. and engages into a roundabout with Mardi Gras Boulevard, a local road, at grade level between the two bridge spans. Shortly afterward, LA 428 turns to the northeast, and state maintenance ends at the five-point intersection of Lamarque, Vallette, Verret, and Hermosa Streets. Local traffic may travel north on Vallette Street and east onto Newton Street, where state maintenance resumes at an intersection with Behrman Avenue. Here, the roadway widens from two lanes to four lanes with a median and becomes known as General Meyer Avenue. LA 428 proceeds eastward to a terminus at LA 407 (Woodland Drive).

As of 2019, a small portion in Jefferson Parish intersecting LA 23 is under agreement to be removed from the state highway system and transferred to local control.

Parish	Location	mi	km	Destinations	Notes
Jefferson		0.000– 0.009	0.000– 0.014	LA 23 (Belle Chasse Highway) – Belle Chasse, Gretna	Southern terminus
Orleans	New Orleans	3.999– 4.400	6.436– 7.081	US 90 Bus. (Westbank Expressway) – Gretna, New Orleans	Exit 9 on US 90 Bus.; to Crescent City Connection
Jefferson	Gretna	4.963	7.987	LA 23 south (Franklin Avenue)	Northern terminus of LA 23
Orleans	New Orleans	5.862	9.434	Lamarque Street / Vallette Street / Verret Street	End state maintenance
Orleans	New Orleans	Gap in LA 428			
Orleans	New Orleans	5.862	9.434	Behrman Avenue / General Meyer Avenue / Newton Street	Resume state maintenance
Orleans	New Orleans	8.731– 8.817	14.051– 14.190	LA 407 south (Woodland Drive)	Northern terminus of LA 407 and LA 428
1.000 mi = 1.609 km; 1.000 km = 0.621 mi

== Louisiana Highway 429 ==
Louisiana Highway 429
- Location: Ascension Parish
- Length: 10.190 mi (16.399 km)
- Existed: 1955–present

Louisiana Highway 429 (LA 429) runs 10.19 miles (16.40 km) in an east–west direction from LA 73 west of Gonzales to LA 22 north of Sorrento, Ascension Parish.

The entire highway is in Ascension Parish.

Location	mi	km	Destinations	Notes
	0.000	0.000	LA 73 – Dutchtown, Geismar	Western terminus
Gonzales	4.590	7.387	LA 44 south (South Burnside Avenue); LA 3038 (East Cornerview Street)	West end of LA 44 concurrency; western terminus of LA 3038
Gonzales	4.970	7.998	LA 44 north (North Burnside Avenue)	East end of LA 44 concurrency
Gonzales	5.545– 5.555	8.924– 8.940	US 61 (North Airline Highway) – Baton Rouge, New Orleans	
St. Amant	8.382	13.490	LA 431 – Brittany, Port Vincent, Denham Springs	
	10.190	16.399	LA 22 – Springfield, Ponchatoula	Eastern terminus
1.000 mi = 1.609 km; 1.000 km = 0.621 mi

== Louisiana Highway 430 ==
Louisiana Highway 430
- Location: Franklinton–Hackley
- Length: 10.091 mi (16.240 km)
- Existed: 1955–present

Louisiana Highway 430 (LA 430) runs 10.09 miles (16.24 km) in a north–south direction from LA 25 in Franklinton to LA 438 at Hackley, Washington Parish.

The entire highway is in Washington Parish.

Location	mi	km	Destinations	Notes
Franklinton	0.000– 0.025	0.000– 0.040	LA 25 (Main Street, Bene Street)	Southern terminus
Franklinton	0.195	0.314	LA 1069 south (11th Avenue)	Northern terminus of LA 1069
	7.610	12.247	LA 38 west – Mount Hermon, Kentwood	Eastern terminus of LA 38
Hackley	10.091	16.240	LA 438	Northern terminus
1.000 mi = 1.609 km; 1.000 km = 0.621 mi

== Louisiana Highway 431 ==
Louisiana Highway 431
- Location: St. Amant–Port Vincent
- Length: 9.60 mi (15.45 km)

Louisiana Highway 431 (LA 431) runs 9.60 miles (15.45 km) from St. Amant to Port Vincent.

== Louisiana Highway 432 ==
Louisiana Highway 432
- Location: Woodland–Chipola
- Length: 8.54 mi (13.74 km)

Louisiana Highway 432 (LA 432) runs 9.54 miles (15.35 km) from Woodland to Chipola.

== Louisiana Highway 433 ==
Louisiana Highway 433
- Location: Slidell
- Length: 14.83 mi (23.87 km)
- Existed: 1955–present

Louisiana Highway 433 (LA 433) is a state highway in Louisiana that serves Slidell.

== Louisiana Highway 434 ==
Louisiana Highway 434
- Location: Lacombe–St. Tammany
- Length: 10.66 mi (17.16 km)
- Existed: 1955–present

Louisiana Highway 434 (LA 434) runs 10.66 miles (17.16 km) in a north–south direction from a point south of US 190 in Lacombe to LA 36 between Abita Springs and Hickory, St. Tammany Parish.

From the south, LA 434 begins at the intersection of Lake Road and Barringer Road about 2 miles (3.2 km) from the shore of Lake Pontchartrain. It proceeds northward on Lake Road to a junction with US 190 and LA 1093-1. At this point, it turns northeast concurrent with US 190 across Bayou Lacombe. Shortly thereafter, LA 434 turns northward and eventually intersects I-12 at a diamond interchange at Exit 74. It continues northward through the community of St. Tammany to a terminus at LA 36.

LA 434 is an undivided two-lane highway for its entire length.

The entire highway is in St. Tammany Parish.

Location	mi	km	Destinations	Notes
Lacombe	0.0	0.0	Lake Road, Barringer Road	Southern terminus
Lacombe	1.6	2.6	US 190 west – Mandeville; LA 1093-1 (Davis Avenue)	South end of US 190 concurrency; southern terminus of LA 1093-1
Lacombe	1.9	3.1	US 190 east – Slidell	North end of US 190 concurrency; roundabout
Lacombe	4.4– 4.8	7.1– 7.7	I-12 – Slidell, Hammond	Exit 74 on I-12
St. Tammany	10.3	16.6	LA 36 (Hickory Highway)	Northern terminus
1.000 mi = 1.609 km; 1.000 km = 0.621 mi: Concurrency terminus

== Louisiana Highway 435 ==
Louisiana Highway 435
- Location: Abita Springs–Talisheek
- Length: 11.47 mi (18.46 km)
- Existed: 1955–present

Louisiana Highway 435 (LA 435) runs 11.47 miles (18.46 km) in an east–west direction from LA 36/LA 59 in Abita Springs to LA 41 in Talisheek. It is an undivided two-lane highway for its entire length.

The route has a spur that travels 0.70 miles (1.13 km) to an alternate connection with LA 41, essentially forming a large Y-junction between LA 435 and LA 41.

The entire highway is in St. Tammany Parish.

Location	mi	km	Destinations	Notes
Abita Springs	0.0	0.0	LA 36 / LA 59 (Level Street, Maple Street)	Western terminus; roundabout
Talisheek	11.0	17.7	LA 435 Spur north to LA 41	Southern terminus of LA 435 Spur
Talisheek	11.5	18.5	LA 41 – Bogalusa, Pearl River	Eastern terminus
1.000 mi = 1.609 km; 1.000 km = 0.621 mi

== Louisiana Highway 436 ==
Louisiana Highway 436
- Location: Franklinton–Varnado
- Length: 26.14 mi (42.07 km)

Louisiana Highway 436 (LA 436) runs 26.14 miles (42.07 km) from Franklinton to Varnado.

== Louisiana Highway 437 ==
Louisiana Highway 437
- Location: Covington–Zona
- Length: 20.63 mi (33.20 km)

Louisiana Highway 437 (LA 437) runs 20.63 miles (33.20 km) from Covington to Zona.

== Louisiana Highway 438 ==
Louisiana Highway 438
- Location: Mt. Hermon–Angie
- Length: 37.78 mi (60.80 km)

Louisiana Highway 438 (LA 438) runs 37.78 miles (60.80 km) from Mt. Hermon to Angie.

== Louisiana Highway 439 ==
Louisiana Highway 439
- Location: Sheridan–Bogalusa
- Length: 12.71 mi (20.45 km)

Louisiana Highway 439 (LA 439) runs 12.71 miles (20.45 km) from Sheridan to Bogalusa.

== Louisiana Highway 440 ==
Louisiana Highway 440
- Location: Hutchinson Creek–Richardson
- Length: 27.56 mi (44.35 km)
- Existed: 1955–present

Louisiana Highway 440 (LA 440) runs 27.56 miles (44.35 km) in an east–west direction from LA 441 north of Greensburg, St. Helena Parish to LA 10 west of Franklinton, Washington Parish.

The route heads east from LA 441 from a point just north of the Hutchinson Creek Wildlife Management Area and soon crosses from St. Helena Parish into Tangipahoa Parish. It then passes through an interchange with I-55 south of Kentwood and intersects the parallel US 51 in Tangipahoa. Just east of Tangipahoa, the roadway continues straight ahead as LA 1057 while LA 440 dips to the south onto a parallel alignment through Bolivar. Just before crossing into Washington Parish, LA 440 curves to the northeast and rejoins LA 1057. In Washington Parish, LA 440 heads slightly southeast to its terminus at LA 10 in Richardson, a point west of Franklinton.

== Louisiana Highway 441 ==
Louisiana Highway 441
- Location: Livingston Parish–Mississippi state line
- Length: 43.744 mi (70.399 km)
- Existed: 1955–present

Louisiana Highway 441 (LA 441) runs 43.74 miles (70.39 km) in a north–south direction from LA 42 west of Springfield to the Mississippi state line north of Easleyville.

Parish	Location	mi	km	Destinations	Notes
Livingston		0.000	0.000	LA 42 – Springfield, French Settlement	Southern terminus
Livingston		2.110– 2.551	3.396– 4.105	I-12 – Hammond, Baton Rouge	Exit 29 on I-12
Livingston	Holden	4.960	7.982	US 190 (Florida Boulevard) – Albany, Livingston	
Livingston		5.583	8.985	LA 1036 north	Southern terminus of LA 1036
Livingston	Starns	9.147– 9.216	14.721– 14.832	LA 442 east	South end of LA 442 concurrency
Livingston	Starns	9.224– 9.308	14.845– 14.980	Bridge over Tickfaw River	
Livingston	Starns	5.877	9.458	LA 442 west	North end of LA 442 concurrency
St. Helena	Montpelier	16.744	26.947	LA 1036 west	Northern terminus of LA 1036 (signed east–west here)
St. Helena	Montpelier	17.840	28.711	LA 16 west (4th Street) – Pine Grove	South end of LA 16 concurrency
St. Helena	Montpelier	17.989	28.950	LA 43 north – Greensburg	South end of LA 43 concurrency
St. Helena	Montpelier	18.317– 18.486	29.478– 29.750	Bridge over Tickfaw River	
St. Helena		19.870	31.978	LA 16 east – Amite LA 43 south – Albany	North end of LA 16 and LA 43 concurrencies
St. Helena	Hillsdale	23.691	38.127	LA 1045	
St. Helena		24.467	39.376	LA 1046 east	Western terminus of LA 1046
St. Helena		27.836	44.798	LA 1047 east	Northern terminus of LA 1047 (signed east–west here)
St. Helena		29.816	47.984	LA 10 east – Fluker	South end of LA 10 concurrency
St. Helena		30.446	48.998	LA 10 west – Greensburg	North end of LA 10 concurrency
St. Helena		35.349	56.889	LA 440 east	Western terminus of LA 440
St. Helena		38.160	61.413	LA 38 east – Kentwood	South end of LA 38 concurrency
St. Helena		38.760	62.378	LA 38 west – Easleyville	North end of LA 38 concurrency
St. Helena		43.744	70.399	MS 571 north – Gillsburg	Northern terminus; continuation in Mississippi
1.000 mi = 1.609 km; 1.000 km = 0.621 mi: Concurrency terminus

== Louisiana Highway 442 ==
Louisiana Highway 442
- Location: Magnolia–Loranger
- Length: 23.22 mi (37.37 km)
- Existed: 1955–present

Louisiana Highway 442 (LA 442) runs 23.22 miles (37.37 km) in an east–west direction from LA 63 north of Livingston to the junction of LA 40 and LA 443 north of Hammond.

The route heads east from LA 63 and intersects LA 1036 and LA 441, both of which it overlaps as it crosses various branches of the Tickfaw River. Further east, LA 442 intersects LA 43 and crosses from Livingston Parish into Tangipahoa Parish. Just west of Tickfaw, LA 442 passes through a diamond interchange with I-55 at exit 36. In the center of town, LA 442 zigzags via US 51 and proceeds northeast out of the corporate limits. After crossing the Tangipahoa River, the route curves due east to its terminus at a four-way junction with LA 40 and LA 443 south of Loranger. LA 442 is an undivided two-lane highway for its entire length.

Parish	Location	mi	km	Destinations	Notes
Livingston		0.0	0.0	LA 63 – Livingston	Western terminus
Livingston	Magnolia	3.2	5.1	LA 1036 north	West end of LA 1036 concurrency
Livingston		4.2	6.8	LA 1036 south	East end of LA 1036 concurrency
Livingston		5.9	9.5	LA 441 north	West end of LA 441 concurrency
Livingston	Starns	6.2	10.0	LA 441 south	East end of LA 441 concurrency
Livingston		10.6	17.1	LA 43 – Albany, Montpelier	
Livingston–Tangipahoa parish line		12.0	19.3	LA 1063 north	Southern terminus of LA 1063
Tangipahoa		15.5– 15.9	24.9– 25.6	I-55 – Hammond, Jackson	Exit 36 on I-55
Tangipahoa	Tickfaw	16.9	27.2	US 51 north	West end of US 51 concurrency
Tangipahoa	Tickfaw	17.0	27.4	US 51 south	East end of US 51 concurrency
Tangipahoa		18.4	29.6	LA 1065	
Tangipahoa		23.0	37.0	LA 40 / LA 443 south	Eastern terminus of LA 442; northern terminus of LA 443
1.000 mi = 1.609 km; 1.000 km = 0.621 mi: Concurrency terminus

== Louisiana Highway 443 ==
Louisiana Highway 443
- Location: Hammond
- Length: 8.30 mi (13.36 km)
- Existed: 1955–present

Louisiana Highway 443 (LA 443) runs 8.30 miles (13.36 km) in a north–south direction along Morris Road from US 190 in Hammond to a junction with LA 40 and LA 442 south of Loranger, Tangipahoa Parish.

The route heads northeast out of Hammond and has a brief concurrency with LA 1064 north of town. After crossing the Tangipahoa River, LA 443 turns due north to its end at LA 40 and LA 442, connecting to Tickfaw, Independence, and Folsom. LA 443 is an undivided two-lane highway for its entire length.

The entire highway is in Tangipahoa Parish.

Location	mi	km	Destinations	Notes
Hammond	0.0	0.0	US 190 – Hammond, Covington	Southern terminus
	3.0	4.8	LA 1064 west (Natalbany Road) – Natalbany	South end of LA 1064 concurrency
	4.4	7.1	LA 1064 east (River Road)	North end of LA 1064 concurrency
	5.4	8.7	Bridge over Tangipahoa River	
	8.2	13.2	LA 40 – Loranger, Folsom LA 442 west – Tickfaw	Northern terminus; eastern terminus of LA 442
1.000 mi = 1.609 km; 1.000 km = 0.621 mi: Concurrency terminus

== Louisiana Highway 444 ==
Louisiana Highway 444
- Location: French Settlement–Killian
- Length: 14.76 mi (23.75 km)
- Existed: 1955–present

Louisiana Highway 444 (LA 444) runs 14.76 miles (23.75 km) in an east–west direction from LA 16 in French Settlement to LA 22 in Killian, Livingston Parish.

The route heads northeast out of French Settlement, intersecting LA 63 at Verdun, and parallels the route of LA 22 into Killian. LA 444 is an undivided two-lane highway for its entire length.

The entire highway is in Livingston Parish.

Location	mi	km	Destinations	Notes
French Settlement	0.0	0.0	LA 16 – Head of Island, Port Vincent	Western terminus
Verdun	4.9	7.9	LA 63 (South Frost Road) – Frost, Livingston	Southern terminus of LA 63
Killian	14.8	23.8	LA 22 – Springfield, Hammond	Eastern terminus
1.000 mi = 1.609 km; 1.000 km = 0.621 mi: Concurrency terminus

== Louisiana Highway 445 ==
Louisiana Highway 445
- Location: Tangipahoa Parish
- Length: 24.58 mi (39.56 km)
- Existed: 1955–present

Louisiana Highway 445 (LA 445) is a state highway in Louisiana that serves Tangipahoa Parish.

== Louisiana Highway 447 ==
Louisiana Highway 447
- Location: Livingston Parish
- Length: 20.19 mi (32.49 km)
- Existed: 1955–present

Louisiana Highway 447 (LA 447) runs 20.19 miles (32.49 km) in a north–south direction from LA 16 in Port Vincent to LA 63 north of Walker, Livingston Parish.

The route heads north from LA 16 in Port Vincent as an undivided two-lane highway. Upon entering Walker, LA 447 passes through a diamond interchange with I-12 at Exit 15. The highway widens to four lanes with a center turning lane and proceeds through downtown Walker, crossing both US 190 and LA 1027. Reverting again to two lanes, LA 447 proceeds north through rural west-central Livingston Parish and intersects LA 1029, LA 1025, LA 1024, and LA 1019 before ending at LA 63 near the St. Helena Parish line.

The entire highway is in Livingston Parish.

Location	mi	km	Destinations	Notes
Port Vincent	0.0	0.0	LA 16 – Port Vincent, Denham Springs	Southern terminus
Walker	8.2– 8.6	13.2– 13.8	I-12 – Hammond, Baton Rouge	Exit 15 on I-12
Walker	9.6	15.4	US 190 (Florida Boulevard)	
Walker	9.7	15.6	LA 1027 west (Burgess Avenue)	Eastern terminus of LA 1027
	11.3	18.2	LA 1029 south	Northern terminus of LA 1029
	13.0	20.9	LA 1025 west (Arnold Road)	Eastern terminus of LA 1025
	15.0	24.1	LA 1024 (Cane Market Road)	
Friendship	16.5	26.6	LA 1019 (Springfield Road)	
	20.3	32.7	LA 63	Northern terminus
1.000 mi = 1.609 km; 1.000 km = 0.621 mi

== Louisiana Highway 448 ==
Louisiana Highway 448
- Location: St. Helena Parish
- Length: 8.59 mi (13.82 km)
- Existed: 1955–present

Louisiana Highway 448 (LA 448) runs 8.59 miles (13.82 km) in a north–south direction from LA 37 north of Grangeville to LA 10 at Darlington, St. Helena Parish.

A rural route heading along the west side of St. Helena Parish, LA 444 parallels the Amite River at a distance, connecting LA 10 and LA 37, which intersect in Greensburg to the east. It is an undivided two-lane highway for its entire length.

The entire highway is in St. Helena Parish.

Location	mi	km	Destinations	Notes
	0.0	0.0	LA 37 – Greensburg, Baton Rouge	Southern terminus
Darlington	8.6	13.8	LA 10 – Greensburg, Clinton	Northern terminus
1.000 mi = 1.609 km; 1.000 km = 0.621 mi

== Louisiana Highway 449 ==
Louisiana Highway 449
- Location: Walker–Greensburg
- Length: 23.73 mi (38.19 km)
- Existed: 1955–present

Louisiana Highway 449 (LA 449) runs 23.73 miles (38.19 km) in a north–south direction from US 190 in Walker, Livingston Parish to LA 37 southwest of Greensburg, St. Helena Parish.

LA 449 heads north from Walker and intersects LA 1024, followed by LA 63. LA 449 turns west concurrent with LA 63 for a very short time before the former turns again to the north. After crossing from Livingston Parish into St. Helena Parish, LA 449 enters the community of Pine Grove, where it intersects LA 16. LA 449 makes a brief jog east onto LA 16 before proceeding north again at LA 1041. LA 449 continues in a north-northeast direction to a terminus at LA 37 southeast of Greensburg.

LA 449 is an undivided two lane highway for its entire length.

Parish	Location	mi	km	Destinations	Notes
Livingston	Walker	0.0	0.0	US 190 (Florida Boulevard)	Southern terminus
Livingston		4.5	7.2	LA 1024 (Cane Market Road)	
Livingston		8.3	13.4	LA 63 south (Weiss Road)	South end of LA 63 concurrency
Livingston		8.4	13.5	LA 63 north (Weiss Road)	North end of LA 63 concurrency
St. Helena	Pine Grove	16.4	26.4	LA 16 west	South end of LA 16 concurrency
St. Helena	Pine Grove	16.5	26.6	LA 16 east / LA 1041 eest	North end of LA 16 concurrency; western terminus of LA 1041
St. Helena		23.8	38.3	LA 37	Northern terminus
1.000 mi = 1.609 km; 1.000 km = 0.621 mi: Concurrency terminus
