= Chenal, Louisiana =

Unincorporated community in Louisiana

Chenal
- Unincorporated community
- Location of Chenal in Louisiana
- Coordinates: 30°36′45″N 91°22′47″W
- Country: United States
- State: Louisiana
- Time zone: UTC-6 (CST)
  - Summer (DST): UTC-5 (CDT)
- Area code: 225
- GNIS feature ID: 553963
- FIPS code: 22-14625

Chenal (pronounced Sh Nahl) is an unincorporated community located in southeastern Pointe Coupee Parish, Louisiana, United States. The word "chenal" is the French word for "channel". The community's name is derived from a body of water located just south of it. This body of water, known as "the Chenal" or "le chenal", is a remnant of the Old Mississippi River channel that once flowed through the area. This channel as well as nearby False River were once parts of the main channel of the Mississippi.

== History ==
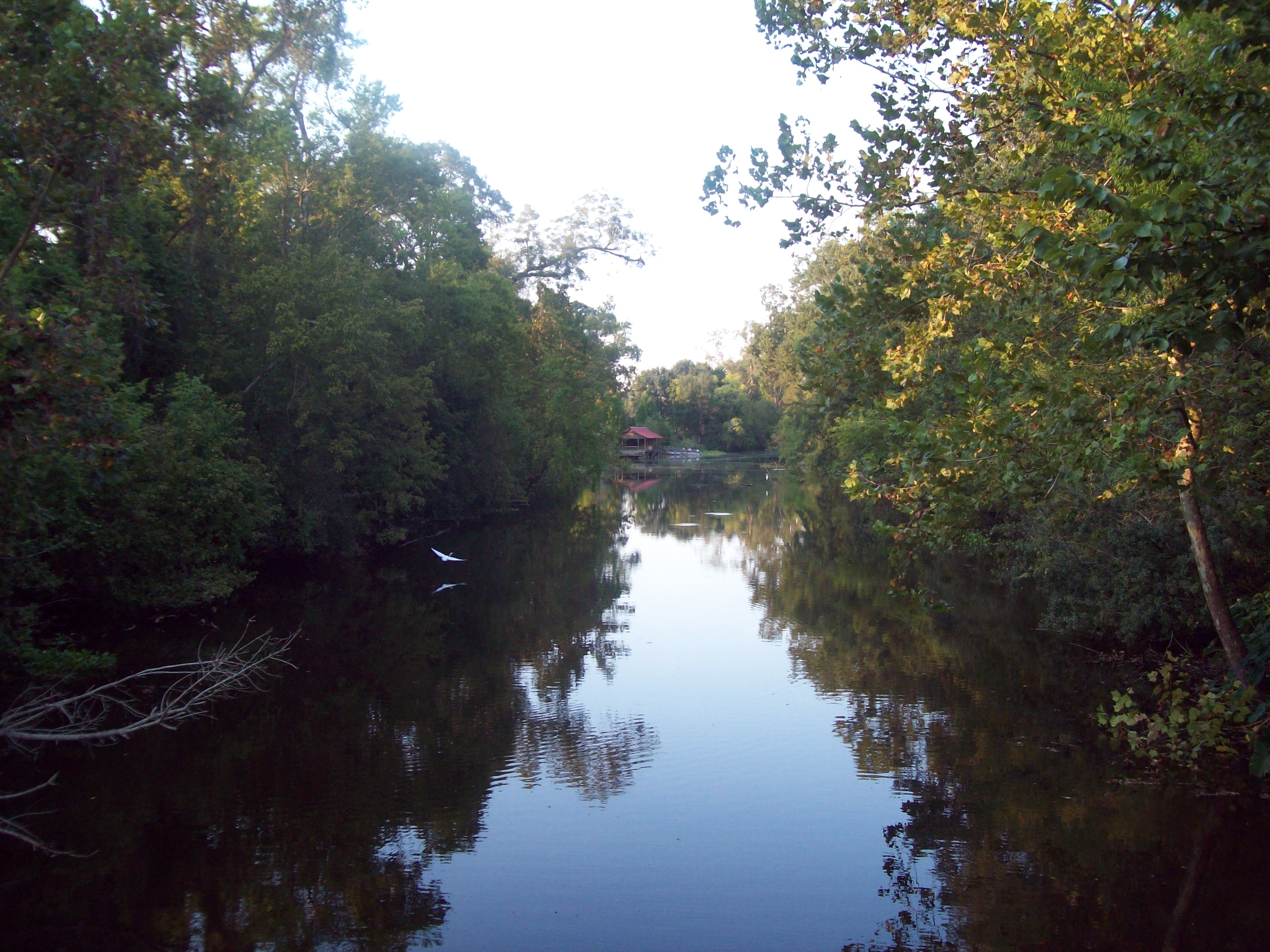
The Chenal, running parallel to LA 414 and LA 416

The first church to be known in this area as Our Lady of the Immaculate Conception was established in the area as a mission in 1853. The church later burned down and was relocated to its current site in Lakeland, Louisiana. The site of the original church, in the area still known as Chenal, is the current location of the Chenal Cemetery.

A post office was established in Chenal in 1892. This post office closed down in 1951 when a new post office was set up in Rougon, to service both communities.

== Geography ==
Chenal is situated west of the Mississippi River, along Louisiana Highway 414. It is nearly due north of the nearby community of Rougon.
