= Louisiana Highway 415 =

State highway in Louisiana, United States

Louisiana Highway 415

Route information
- Maintained by Louisiana DOTD
- Length: 25.3 mi (40.7 km)
- Existed: 1955 renumbering–present

Major junctions
- South end: I-10 near Port Allen
- US 190 / LA 1 in Lobdell
- North end: LA 413 near New Roads

Location
- Country: United States
- State: Louisiana
- Parishes: West Baton Rouge, Pointe Coupee

Highway system
- Louisiana State Highway System; Interstate; US; State; Scenic
← LA 414	→ LA 416

Louisiana Highway 415 (LA 415) is a state highway in Louisiana. It spans north–south through West Baton Rouge Parish and Pointe Coupee Parish for 25.3 miles (40.7 km).

== Route description ==
LA 415 begins at Interstate 10's exit 151 in West Baton Rouge Parish, west of Port Allen. Just north of the interchange, LA 415 begins a concurrency with LA 76. The two routes travel north as a four-lane undivided highway with a center turn lane. After LA 76 exits the concurrency, LA 415 continues north and widens to a divided highway. In the unincorporated community of Lobdell, LA 415 turns off the divided highway to continue north on a two-lane undivided road. The divided highway continues for about one-half mile (0.80 km) as LA 415 Spur and provides access to westbound U.S. Route 190 and northbound LA 1. LA 415 makes two sharp turns to pass under US 190 and LA 1 with access to eastbound US 190 and southbound LA 1 being provided via nearby roads. Just before a levee to the Mississippi River, the road comes to a T-intersection with LA 986 at its northern terminus. LA 415 makes a left onto the road paralleling the levee.

The road continues to parallel the levee through northern West Baton Rouge and eastern Pointe Coupee parishes passing multiple minor state highways along its route. Near its northernmost stretches, LA 415 travels on land that was once the channel of the Mississippi River. Access to the lake formerly part of the river, known as the False River, is provided by LA 416 and LA 414, the latter of which has a two-mile-long (3.2 km) concurrency with LA 415. The highway turns west away from the Mississippi River at LA 981's southern terminus. Along Patin Dyke Road, LA 415 ends at LA 413 about one mile (1.6 km) east of the town limits of New Roads.

== Major junctions ==
Parish	Location	mi	km	Destinations	Notes
West Baton Rouge		0.0– 0.2	0.0– 0.32	I-10 / Lobdell Highway – Baton Rouge, Lafayette	Exit 151 (I-10)
West Baton Rouge		0.4	0.64	LA 76 east (Court Street)	Southern end of LA 76 concurrency
West Baton Rouge		1.2	1.9	LA 76 west / LA 986 east (Rosedale Road)	Northern end of LA 76 concurrency; western terminus of LA 986
West Baton Rouge		2.3	3.7	(former); LA 987-3 Spur to LA 987-3	
West Baton Rouge	Lobdell	3.3	5.3	LA 987-3 east (Plantation Avenue) / LA 415 Spur north (Lobdell Highway) to US 190 west / LA 1 north	Northern terminus of LA 987-3; southern terminus of LA 415 Spur
West Baton Rouge	Lobdell	3.4– 3.7	5.5– 6.0	US 190 east / LA 1 south	Interchange
West Baton Rouge	Lobdell	4.0	6.4	LA 986 south (North River Road)	Northern terminus of LA 986
West Baton Rouge	Chamberlin	8.8	14.2	LA 620 west (Section Road)	Eastern terminus of LA 620
West Baton Rouge	Alfords	12.9	20.8	LA 985 south (Rosehill Road)	Northern terminus of LA 985
West Baton Rouge	Arbroth	15.1	24.3	LA 984 south (Bueche Road)	Northern terminus of LA 984
West Baton Rouge	Arbroth	15.8	25.4	LA 982 west (Arbroth Road)	Eastern terminus of LA 982
Pointe Coupee	Hermitage	19.2	30.9	LA 416 west	Eastern terminus of LA 416
Pointe Coupee		19.7	31.7	LA 414 south (Chenal Road)	Southern end of LA 414 concurrency
Pointe Coupee		22.0	35.4	LA 414 north	Northern end of LA 414 concurrency
Pointe Coupee	Waterloo	22.4	36.0	LA 981 north	Southern terminus of LA 981
Pointe Coupee		25.3	40.7	LA 413 (Patin Dyke Road)	
1.000 mi = 1.609 km; 1.000 km = 0.621 mi: Concurrency terminus

== Spur route ==
Louisiana Highway 415 Spur
- Location: Port Allen
- Length: 0.46 mi (740 m)

Louisiana Spur Highway 415 (SPUR LA 415) is a 0.46-mile (0.74 km) highway in Port Allen, Louisiana. It runs from south to north, connecting mainline LA 415 with US 190 and LA 1.

Starting at an intersection with LA 415 and LA 987-3, LA 415 Spur serves the purpose of moving traffic from US 190 onto LA 415 south towards I-10 and Baton Rouge. It is signed southbound as South Spur LA 415, but is signed northbound only as Alternate Route I-10.

The entire highway is in Port Allen, West Baton Rouge Parish.

mi	km	Destinations	Notes
0.0	0.0	LA 987-3 / LA 415 to US 190 east / LA 1 south	Southern terminus
0.4	0.64	US 190 west (Airline Highway) / LA 1 north	Northern terminus
1.000 mi = 1.609 km; 1.000 km = 0.621 mi
