= Louisiana Highway 76 =

State highway in Louisiana, United States

Louisiana Highway 76

- Route of LA 76 highlighted in red

Route information
- Maintained by Louisiana DOTD
- Length: 25.516 mi (41.064 km)
- Existed: 1955 renumbering–present

Major junctions
- West end: LA 77 in Maringouin
- LA 3000 north of Ramah; LA 77 in Rosedale; LA 415 west of Port Allen
- East end: LA 1 / LA 987-4 in Port Allen

Location
- Country: United States
- State: Louisiana
- Parishes: Iberville, West Baton Rouge

Highway system
- Louisiana State Highway System; Interstate; US; State; Scenic
| ← LA 75 | → LA 77 |

Louisiana Highway 76 (LA 76) is a state highway located in southeastern Louisiana. It runs 25.52 miles (41.07 km) in a general east–west direction from LA 77 in Maringouin to the junction of LA 1 and LA 987-4 in Port Allen.

The route initially heads south from Maringouin alongside the bayou of the same name before turning east through the village of Rosedale. This portion of LA 76 makes a loop off of LA 77 and connects the two communities to Interstate 10 (I-10) via LA 3000 at Ramah. East of Rosedale, LA 76 crosses from Iberville Parish into West Baton Rouge Parish and parallels I-10 into Port Allen, the parish seat. The east–west portion of LA 76 is also signed as an Incident Alternate Route of I-10.

LA 76 was designated in the 1955 Louisiana Highway renumbering, essentially replacing State Route 998 and State Route 142 west of Rosedale, as well as short portions of State Route 1, State Route 7, and State Route 30 between Rosedale and Port Allen. This latter stretch had served as part of the Jefferson Highway auto trail, as well as U.S. Highways 71 and 190 before the completion of the Huey P. Long Bridge across the Mississippi River in 1940.

== Route description ==
From the west, LA 76 begins at a T-intersection with LA 77 in the small Iberville Parish town of Maringouin. It heads south, continuing the path of LA 77 alongside Bayou Maringouin. After 5.8 miles (9.3 km), LA 3000 picks up the route and proceeds a short distance further to an interchange with I-10 at Ramah. Meanwhile, LA 76 turns northeast onto Rosedale Road and continues into the village of Rosedale. Here, the highway has a second junction with LA 77, which follows Bayou Grosse Tete through the area. LA 76 crosses a bascule bridge over the bayou and immediately intersects LA 411 on the opposite bank. Just northeast of Rosedale, the surroundings change abruptly from rural farmland to thickly wooded wetlands, and LA 76 crosses into West Baton Rouge Parish.

About 3.5 miles (5.6 km) across the parish line, LA 76 intersects LA 413 (Poydras Bayou Drive), connecting with US 190 at Erwinville. Soon afterward, LA 76 curves due east, and the surroundings return to rural farmland. Four miles (6.4 km) later, LA 76 intersects LA 1145 (Calumet Road) and then dips south slightly to a junction with LA 415 (Lobdell Highway), a four-lane thoroughfare. Rosedale Road continues straight ahead as part of LA 986 while LA 76 turns south to run concurrent with LA 415 for a short distance. LA 76 turns east again onto Court Street just north of an interchange with I-10 and returns to its original two-lane capacity.

The highway then proceeds into the small city of Port Allen, which serves as the parish seat. Immediately after crossing the Union Pacific Railroad (UP) line at grade, LA 76 ends at a junction with LA 1 (Alexander Avenue), a divided four-lane highway with service roads. Court Street continues straight ahead toward the Mississippi River as part of LA 987-4.

=== Route classification and data ===
LA 76 has several different classifications by the Louisiana Department of Transportation and Development (La DOTD) over the course of its route. It generally functions as a rural minor collector along the Bayou Maringouin road, a rural major collector along Rosedale Road, an urban principal arterial along Lobdell Highway, and an urban minor arterial along Court Street. Daily traffic volume in 2013 peaked at 24,100 vehicles on Lobdell Highway outside of Port Allen. The lowest numbers were reported south of Maringouin with an average between 790 and 970 vehicles per day. The posted speed limit is generally 55 mph (90 km/h) in rural areas, but is reduced as low as 25 mph (40 km/h) through town.

== History ==
In the original Louisiana Highway system in use between 1921 and 1955, LA 76 was part of several different routes, including State Route 998 along Bayou Maringouin; State Route 142 to Rosedale; State Route 1 and State Route 7 to Lobdell Highway; and State Route 30 into Port Allen. The section between Rosedale and Port Allen had formerly been part of one of the state's most important highways, the Jefferson Highway auto trail, which was the main traffic route between New Orleans, Baton Rouge, and Shreveport in the days before the numbered U.S. Highway system. It became part of the original alignment of US 71 in 1926 and then US 190 in 1935 when the latter was extended west from Baton Rouge. This portion of what is now LA 76 connected to the Baton Rouge ferry across the Mississippi River before the completion of the Huey P. Long Bridge upstream on the current alignment of US 190 in 1940. This and other highway realignments in the area caused the Rosedale Road to decline in importance in the years leading up to the Louisiana Department of Highways' renumbering of the state highway system in 1955.

LA 76 was created in the 1955 renumbering, bringing portions of several different former routes under a single designation.

Class "B": La 76—From a junction with La 77 at or near Rosedale to a junction with La 1 at or near Port Allen.
Class "C": La 76—From a junction with La 77 at or near Maringouin through or near Ramah to a junction with La 77 at or near Rosedale.

— 1955 legislative route description

With the 1955 renumbering, the state highway department initially categorized all routes into three classes: "A" (primary), "B" (secondary), and "C" (farm-to-market). This system has since been updated and replaced by a more specific functional classification system.

== Future ==
La DOTD is currently engaged in a program that aims to transfer about 5,000 miles (8,000 km) of state-owned roadways to local governments over the next several years. Under this plan of "right-sizing" the state highway system, the eastern portion of LA 76 along Court Street in the Port Allen area is proposed for deletion as it no longer meets a significant interurban travel function.

== Major intersections ==
| Parish | Location | mi | km | Destinations | Notes |
|---|---|---|---|---|---|
| Iberville | Maringouin | 0.000 | 0.000 | LA 77 north to US 190 – Livonia LA 77 south (Landry Drive) – Maringouin, Rosedale | Western terminus |
| Iberville | | 5.813 | 9.355 | LA 3000 south to I-10 – Ramah | Northern terminus of LA 3000 |
| Iberville | Rosedale | 9.394 | 15.118 | LA 77 – Grosse Tete, Maringouin | |
| Iberville | Rosedale | 9.411– 9.454 | 15.146– 15.215 | Bridge over Bayou Grosse Tete | |
| Iberville | Rosedale | 9.457 | 15.220 | LA 411 north to US 190 | Southern terminus of LA 411 |
| West Baton Rouge | | 14.164 | 22.795 | LA 413 north (Poydras Bayou Drive) – Erwinville | Southern terminus of LA 413 |
| West Baton Rouge | | 20.619 | 33.183 | LA 1145 north (Calumet Road) | Southern terminus of LA 1145 |
| West Baton Rouge | | 22.596 | 36.365 | LA 415 north (Lobdell Highway); LA 986 (Rosedale Road) | West end of LA 415 concurrency; southern terminus of LA 986 |
| West Baton Rouge | | 23.377– 23.462 | 37.622– 37.758 | LA 415 south (Lobdell Highway) to I-10 | East end of LA 415 concurrency |
| West Baton Rouge | Port Allen | 25.506– 25.516 | 41.048– 41.064 | LA 1 (Alexander Avenue); LA 987-4 (Court Street) | Eastern terminus of LA 76; western terminus of LA 987-4 |
1.000 mi = 1.609 km; 1.000 km = 0.621 mi: Concurrency terminus
