= Louisiana Highway 1 Business =

Louisiana Highway 1 Business may refer to:

- Louisiana Highway 1 Business (Natchitoches) (LA 1 Business) in Natchitoches
- Louisiana Highway 1 Business (New Roads) (LA 1 Business) in New Roads
