= Louisiana Highway 1 =

Highway in Louisiana

Louisiana Highway 1
- LA 1 highlighted in red

Route information
- Maintained by Louisiana DOTD
- Length: 431.877 mi (695.039 km)
- Existed: 1955 renumbering–present
- Tourist routes: National Scenic Byway: Great River Road; Louisiana Scenic Byways: Boom or Bust Byway; Cane River National Heritage Trail; Wetlands Cultural Byway

Major junctions
- South end: Dead end at Bayou Rigaud in Grand Isle
- Future I-49 / US 90 in Raceland; I-10 in Port Allen; US 190 west of Baton Rouge; I-49 / US 167 in Alexandria; US 71 / US 165 in Alexandria; I-49 in Boyce; US 84 / US 371 west of Coushatta; I-20 / US 71 in Shreveport; I-220 in Shreveport; I-49 north of Shreveport
- North end: SH 77 at Texas state line northwest of Rodessa

Location
- Country: United States
- State: Louisiana
- Parishes: Jefferson, Lafourche, Assumption, Ascension, Iberville, West Baton Rouge, Pointe Coupee, Avoyelles, Rapides, Natchitoches, Red River, Caddo

Highway system
- Louisiana State Highway System; Interstate; US; State; Scenic
← LA 3286	→ LA 2

Louisiana Highway 1 (LA 1) is a state highway in Louisiana. At 431.88 miles (695.04 km), it is the longest numbered highway of any class in Louisiana. It runs diagonally across the state, connecting the oil and gas fields near the island of Grand Isle with the northwest corner of the state, north of Shreveport.

The part south of U.S. Highway 90 near Raceland is Corridor 44, a National Highway System High Priority Corridor. From Alexandria to Shreveport, the LA 1 corridor was used for Interstate 49.

Between New Roads, Louisiana, and the interchange with Interstate 49 at Alexandria, Louisiana, LA 1 forms part of the Zachary Taylor Parkway.

== Route description ==
The southern terminus of LA 1 (29.2603°N 89.9637°W) is at a dead end in Grand Isle on the south bank of Bayou Rigaud. It heads southwest and west through Grand Isle, turning northwest where it meets LA 3090 (the road to Port Fourchon). At Leeville the road crosses Bayou Lafourche on the Leeville Bridge and begins to parallel the bayou on its west bank, heading through towns such as Golden Meadow, Larose, Lockport, Raceland, Thibodaux, Napoleonville and Paincourtville. At Donaldsonville, where the bayou meets the Mississippi River, LA 1 turns northwest to parallel the river. (Southeast of Donaldsonville, LA 18 and LA 3089/LA 3127 parallel the Mississippi.)

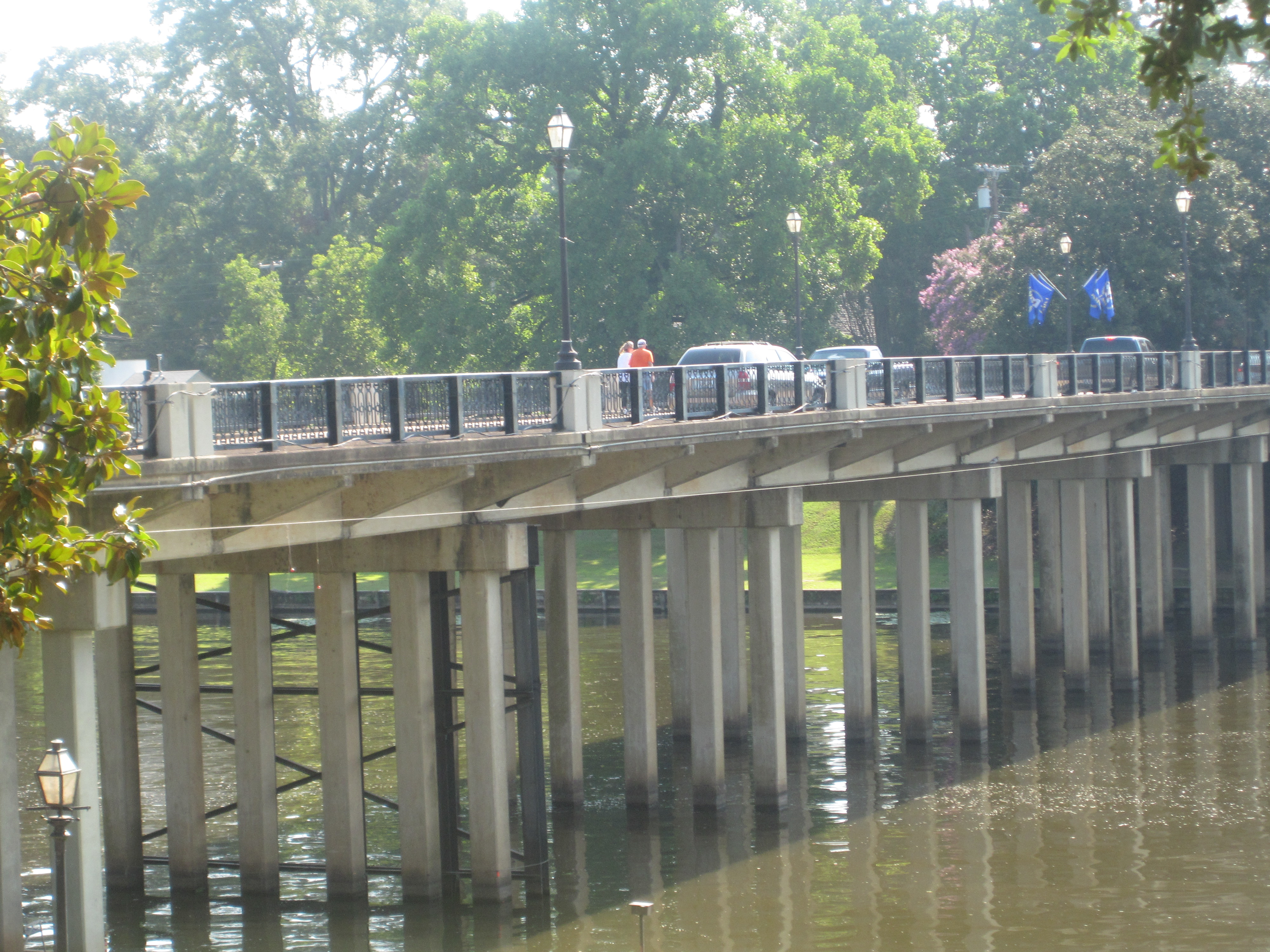
Bridge of LA Highway 1 over the Cane River in Natchitoches

From Donaldsonville to Port Allen, across the Mississippi from Baton Rouge, LA 1 generally parallels the Mississippi River. It takes a relatively straight inland route, bypassing the curves of the river followed by LA 405 and LA 988. At Port Allen, it meets U.S. Highway 190 at the west end of the Huey P. Long Bridge, and turns west with US 190 to past Erwinville. There it turns back north, running along several back channels and oxbows of the Mississippi to New Roads (which is bypassed by LA 3131), and then heading west from New Roads to Morganza with LA 10 (still paralleling the Mississippi). From Morganza to Lettsworth, LA 1 heads northwest near the Mississippi; LA 15 begins in Lettsworth and continues north along the river while LA 1 continues generally northwest towards Alexandria.

LA 1 heads inland through such towns as Simmesport, Moreauville, and Marksville to Alexandria, where it meets the Pineville Expressway (U.S. Highway 165/LA 28). LA 1 turns southwest along its frontage roads - Fulton Street and Casson Street - along with LA 28 Business and U.S. Highway 167 Business to its end at Interstate 49, and continues southwest on Mason Street and northwest on Bolton Avenue.

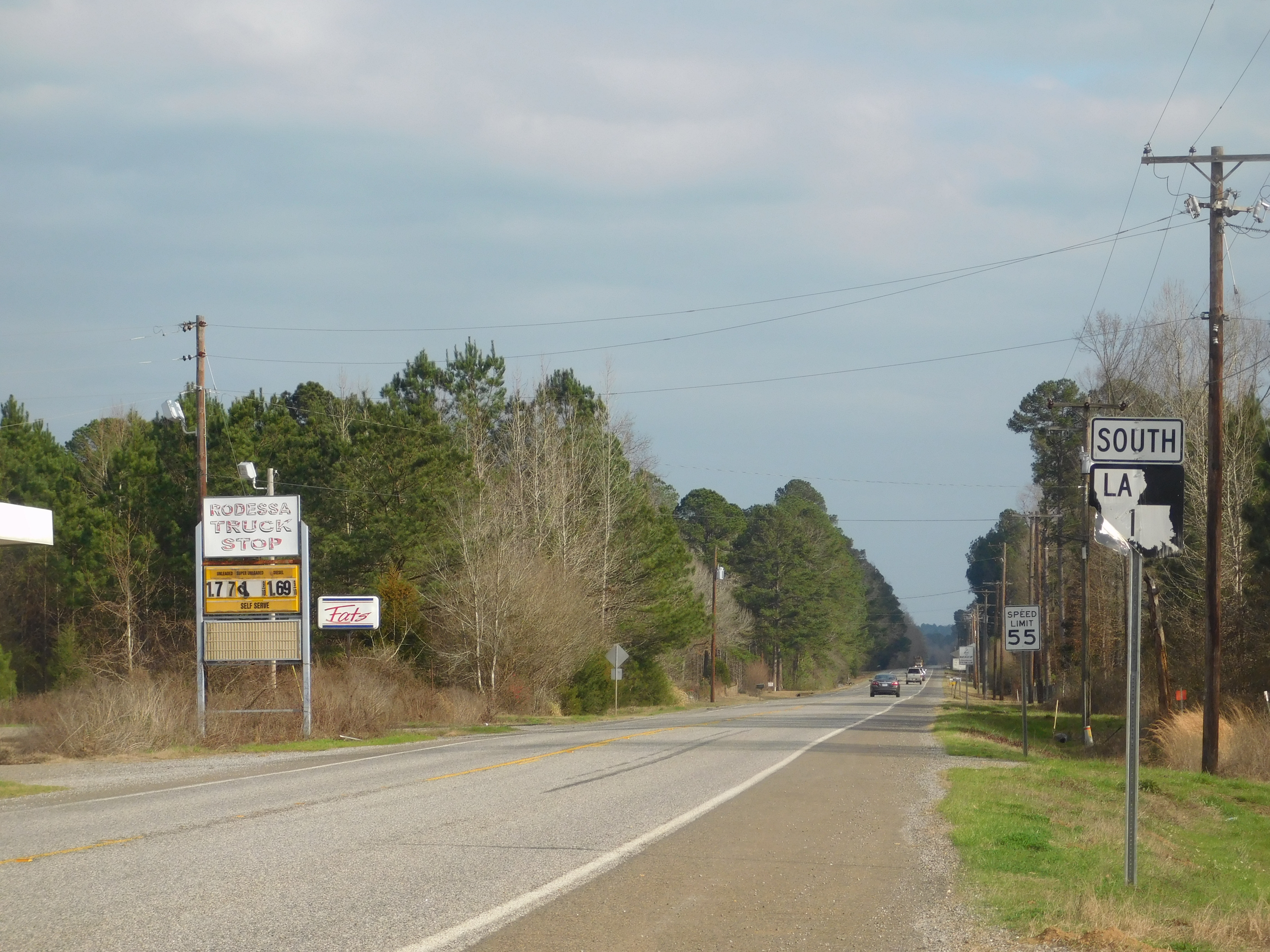
LA 1 in Caddo Parish, after crossing into Louisiana

From Alexandria to Shreveport, LA 1 generally parallels Interstate 49, including a bypass around Natchitoches. Louisiana Highway 1 Business runs through downtown Natchitoches before rejoining the original highway just northwest of the city limits. It passes through Shreveport on Youree Drive, Spring Street and Market Street, running concurrently with U.S. Highway 71 from Interstate 20 downtown to a split north of downtown. From Shreveport to the border with Texas, where LA 1 becomes State Highway 77, LA 1 passes through towns such as Oil City, Vivian and Rodessa.

== History ==
As the successor to the Jefferson Highway, LA 1 started a little further south than the Jefferson Highway, but was the same route, more or less. LA 1 began in Pointe-a-la-Hache, continuing north through small communities, making its way to New Orleans. The route description from New Orleans north is as follows:

From the southern terminus at Common Street, LA 1 followed St. Charles Avenue, Canal Street, City Park Avenue, and Metairie Road into Jefferson Parish. Leaving New Orleans, LA 1 followed Metairie Road, Shrewsbury Road, and Jefferson Highway to Kenner.

From Kenner to Geismar, LA 1 followed alongside the east bank levee of the Mississippi River which, due to various sections of levee being relocated during the 1920s and 1930s, is often a significant distance removed from the modern River Road. Also, a two-mile section between Norco and Montz was eliminated in 1935 when the parallel Airline Highway bridge across the Bonnet Carré Spillway was opened. Portions of LA 1 at Reserve and Gramercy are still known as Jefferson Highway to this day.

From Geismar to Baton Rouge, the route followed what is known as Old Jefferson Highway to downtown Baton Rouge. The original routing through downtown Baton Rouge followed Claycut Road, South Acadian Thruway, Government Street, 19th Street, and North Street to the former Mississippi River ferry landing to Port Allen.

From Port Allen to Alexandria, LA 1 used Court Street, North Jefferson Avenue, and Rosedale Road through Port Allen, then along Rosedale Road to Rosedale, Ravenswood, and then to Red Cross. LA 1 crossed the Atchafalaya River by ferry to Melville and continued on to Lebeau. It used the current route of US 71 to Bunkie, with a short section over a one-lane truss bridge that was bypassed in the mid-1930s. North of Cheneyville, it used US 71 and parts of some bypassed roads to Chambers, then Old Baton Rouge Highway to Alexandria.

In Alexandria and Pineville, LA 1 used Jefferson Hwy., Lee Street, Main Street, and Murray Street through Alexandria, then LA 1 crossed the Red River on a now-demolished bridge at the foot of Murray Street into Pineville, then Main Street and Military Highway, Jefferson Highway, and US 71 (Shreveport Highway) through Pineville.

North of Pineville, LA 1 used US 71 and Shreveport Highway. (Stainaker Street is a small, severed portion of the original route near the junction of US 71 and LA 3225.) Numerous curves were straightened along the route, including a bypassed route through Colfax. North of Colfax, LA 1 followed US 71 north to Clarence, then over on LA 6 to Robeline, then on LA 1 to Belmont, via Old Jefferson Road north of Pelican) to Mansfield, following Old Jefferson Highway into town.

US 171 carried LA 1 to Shreveport, via Old Jefferson Road through Stonewall and Old Mansfield Road through Keithville. Once through Shreveport, LA 1 used US 79-US 80 (Greenwood Road) to Greenwood Road, then US 80 (Texas Avenue) across the state line toward Waskom, Texas. All were designated by various acts of the state legislature between 1921 and 1930. The routes were joined together under the single designation of LA 1 when the Louisiana Department of Highways renumbered the state highway system in 1955, creating a continuous route diagonally across the entire state.

== Future ==
The Louisiana Department of Transportation and Development (DOTD) is converting LA 1 from Golden Meadow to Port Fourchon into an elevated toll expressway called the Louisiana Highway 1 Bridge. These improvements are in order to facilitate evacuations of Port Fourchon and Grand Isle in the event of a hurricane, as LA 1 in this area is vulnerable to flooding, regardless of strength of storm.

When completed, the Gateway to the Gulf Expressway will be a 19-mile-long (31 km) elevated toll road from Golden Meadow to the Gulf of Mexico. Prior to mid-June 2012, tolls were collected using "open road tolling" technology; LA 1 was the first road or bridge in Louisiana to have tolls collected in this method. Travelers using the facilities were required to pre-pay either online, by phone, or at one of five kiosks north of the expressway, or use the "GeauxPass", an electronic toll collection transponder (or "toll tag") that collects tolls electronically. The GeauxPass is also compatible with the Crescent City Connection and all future Louisiana toll roads and the Lake Pontchartrain Causeway, but not the ferries.

Beginning in June 2012, a toll plaza was opened at the access ramp in Leeville. Vehicle drivers must now pay before accessing the expressway and the pre-pay kiosks have been removed from their respective sites. The toll plaza accepts cash or credit/debit cards. GeauxPass is still accepted. Funding for the project through taxes and grants was not available, leading to the requirement to pay for the construction via collecting tolls. By law, LA 1 toll revenues may only be utilized to repay construction loan debts for the expressway.

The first portion of this project, a two-lane toll bridge over Bayou Lafourche, opened on July 8, 2009. Tolling of the new bridge began on August 3, 2009. The two-lane section from Leeville to Port Fourchon opened on December 9, 2011. Construction on the section between Leeville and Golden Meadow began in late 2021 with a completion date to be determined. Long term plans include the eventual widening of the entire corridor to four lanes.

== Major intersections ==
Parish	Location	mi	km	Destinations	Notes
Jefferson	Grand Isle	0.000	0.000	Dead end at Bayou Rigaud	Southern terminus
Jefferson	Grand Isle	0.248	0.399	LA 3151 (Humble Road)	Northern terminus of LA 3151
Jefferson	Grand Isle	1.410	2.269	LA 3151 (Humble Road)	Southern terminus of LA 3151
Jefferson	Grand Isle	2.648	4.262	LA 3150 (Minnich Lane)	Southern terminus of LA 3150
Jefferson	Grand Isle	2.739	4.408	LA 574-9 (Cemetery Lane)	Southern terminus of LA 574-9
Jefferson	Grand Isle	2.779	4.472	LA 574-8 (Landry Lane)	Southern terminus of LA 574-8
Jefferson	Grand Isle	2.850	4.587	LA 574-7 (Hector Lane)	Southern terminus of LA 574-7
Jefferson	Grand Isle	3.035	4.884	LA 574-6 (Niccari Lane)	Southern terminus of LA 574-6
Jefferson	Grand Isle	3.203	5.155	LA 574-5 (Ludwig Lane)	Southern terminus of LA 574-5
Jefferson	Grand Isle	3.319	5.341	LA 574-4 (Chighizola Lane)	Southern terminus of LA 574-4
Jefferson	Grand Isle	3.434	5.526	LA 574-3 (Santiny Lane)	Southern terminus of LA 574-3
Jefferson	Grand Isle	6.437– 7.192	10.359– 11.574	Bridge over Caminada Bay	
Jefferson	Grand Isle	7.226	11.629	LA 574-1 (Central Avenue)	
Lafourche		15.958	25.682	LA 3090 west (A.O. Rappelet Road) – Fourchon	Eastern terminus of LA 3090; southern end of elevated Gateway to the Gulf Expressway (signed as exit 16)
Lafourche	Leeville	21.980– 23.424	35.373– 37.697	Bridge over Bayou Lafourche	
Lafourche	Leeville	24.218	38.975	Old LA 1 – Leeville	Northern end of elevated Gateway to the Gulf Expressway (signed as exit 23)
Lafourche		32.233	51.874	LA 3235 north (South Alex Plaisance Boulevard)	Southern terminus of LA 3235
Lafourche	Golden Meadow	33.826	54.438	LA 308	Southeastern terminus of LA 308
Lafourche	Galliano	40.447	65.093	LA 3162 to LA 308	
Lafourche	Cut Off	44.131	71.022	LA 3161 – Leeville, Grand Isle	Eastern terminus of LA 3161
Lafourche	Larose	48.548	78.130	LA 657 to LA 308 – Cut Off, Grand Isle	
Lafourche	Larose	49.132– 49.519	79.070– 79.693	West Larose Lift Bridge over Gulf Intracoastal Waterway	
Lafourche		59.284	95.408	LA 3220 (Bollinger Bridge Road)	Western terminus of LA 3220
Lafourche	Lockport	61.587– 61.657	99.115– 99.227	Bridge over Company Canal	
Lafourche	Mathews	64.162	103.259	LA 654	Western terminus of LA 654; to South Lafourche Leonard Miller Jr. Airport
Lafourche	Raceland	66.869– 67.186	107.615– 108.125	US 90 – Morgan City, New Orleans	Exits 215 (eastbound) and 215A (westbound) on US 90
Lafourche	Raceland	69.143	111.275	LA 182 east – New Orleans	Southern end of LA 182 concurrency
Lafourche	Raceland	69.677	112.134	LA 182 west – Houma	Northern end of LA 182 concurrency
Lafourche	St. Charles	77.493	124.713	LA 649 (St. Charles Bypass Bridge)	Western terminus of LA 649
Lafourche		82.116	132.153	LA 648 (Percy Brown Road) – Houma	
Lafourche	Thibodaux	84.267	135.615	LA 20 east (St. Patrick Bridge) – Vacherie	Southern end of LA 20 concurrency
Lafourche	Thibodaux	84.395	135.821	LA 20 west (Jackson Street) – Houma	Northern end of LA 20 concurrency
Lafourche		86.061	138.502	LA 3185	
Lafourche		87.485	140.793	LA 309 (Brule Guillot Road) – Chacahoula	Eastern terminus of LA 309
Assumption		91.405	147.102	LA 645 west	Eastern terminus of LA 645
Assumption		92.143	148.290	LA 398 west	Eastern terminus of LA 398
Assumption	Labadieville	92.977	149.632	LA 1247 west (Brule Road)	Southern end of LA 1247 concurrency
Assumption	Labadieville	93.004	149.675	LA 1247 east	Northern end of LA 1247 concurrency
Assumption	Supreme	95.125	153.089	LA 1011	
Assumption		96.102	154.661	LA 400	Eastern terminus of LA 400
Assumption		97.576	157.033	LA 1010 west	Southern end of LA 1010 concurrency
Assumption		97.911	157.572	LA 1010 east	Northern end of LA 1010 concurrency
Assumption	Napoleonville	101.772	163.786	LA 401 (Canal Road) – Attakapas Landing	Eastern terminus of LA 401
Assumption	Napoleonville	101.941	164.058	LA 1008 east (Franklin Avenue)	Southern end of LA 1008 concurrency
Assumption	Napoleonville	102.092	164.301	LA 1008 west	Northern end of LA 1008 concurrency
Assumption		102.880	165.569	LA 1007	Eastern terminus of LA 1007
Assumption	Munsons	103.087	165.902	LA 402 (Hospital Road)	
Assumption	Plattenville	105.976	170.552	LA 70 Spur – Sunshine Bridge	Western terminus of LA 70 Spur
Assumption	Paincourtville	107.553	173.090	LA 403 (St. Vincent Street)	
Assumption	Paincourtville	107.676	173.288	LA 1005 (Westfield Road)	Eastern terminus of LA 1005
Assumption		108.183	174.104	LA 70 – Donaldsonville, Pierre Part	
Assumption	Klotzville	109.526	176.265	LA 1003	Northeastern terminus of LA 1003
Assumption		110.273	177.467	LA 1000	Eastern terminus of LA 1000
Assumption		111.139	178.861	LA 999 (Lula Road)	Eastern terminus of LA 999
Assumption	Belle Rose	112.031	180.296	LA 998	
Ascension		114.843	184.822	LA 943	
Ascension	Donaldsonville	117.535	189.154	LA 18 east (Veterans Boulevard) LA 3089 south (Marchand Drive)	Western terminus of LA 18; northern terminus of LA 3089
Ascension	McCall	120.685	194.224	LA 943	Northern terminus of LA 943
Ascension	McCall	120.831	194.459	LA 405	Southern terminus of LA 405
Iberville	White Castle	127.929	205.882	LA 69 (Bowie Street) – Pierre Part, Belle River	To River Road Plantations
Iberville		128.451	206.722	LA 993 (Richland Road)	
Iberville	Bayou Goula	131.417	211.495	LA 69 (Augusta Road)	Northern terminus of LA 69
Iberville		135.990	218.855	LA 992-3 (St. Louis Road)	Eastern terminus of LA 992-3
Iberville	Plaquemine	137.283	220.936	LA 75 (Belleview Road) – Plaquemine Ferry	
Iberville	Plaquemine	137.304	220.969	LA 1251	Western terminus of LA 1251
Iberville	Plaquemine	137.975	222.049	LA 3066 (Court Street)	Eastern terminus of LA 3066
Iberville	Plaquemine	138.485	222.870	LA 988 (Schnebelen Street)	Southern terminus of LA 988
Iberville	Plaquemine	138.619	223.086	LA 77 north (Bayou Jacob Road)	Southern terminus of LA 77
Iberville		139.912– 139.923	225.167– 225.184	LA 1148 east (Woodlawn Road) LA 1148 Truck (Industrial Boulevard)	Southern end of LA 1148 concurrency; eastern terminus of LA 1148 Truck
Iberville		140.011	225.326	LA 1148 west	Northern end of LA 1148 concurrency
West Baton Rouge	Addis	142.994	230.127	LA 990 (Addis Lane)	
West Baton Rouge		144.958	233.287	LA 989-1 (Lukeville Lane)	
West Baton Rouge	Brusly	145.680	234.449	LA 989-2 (Main Street)	
West Baton Rouge		147.667	237.647	LA 3237 (American Way)	Eastern terminus of LA 3237
West Baton Rouge		148.002	238.186	LA 988 (Beaulieu Lane)	Northern terminus of LA 988
West Baton Rouge		148.903– 149.377	239.636– 240.399	Bridge over Gulf Intracoastal Waterway	
West Baton Rouge	Port Allen	149.402– 150.135	240.439– 241.619	I-10 – Baton Rouge, Lafayette	Exit 153 on I-10; to Port of Baton Rouge and Port Allen Lock via frontage road
West Baton Rouge	Port Allen	150.567	242.314	LA 76 west / LA 987-4 (Court Street)	Eastern terminus of LA 76; western terminus of LA 987-4
West Baton Rouge	Port Allen	151.326	243.536	LA 986 (Rosedale Road) – Rosedale	
West Baton Rouge	Sunrise	152.104	244.788	LA 987-3 (Lafiton Lane)	
West Baton Rouge		154.011– 154.892	247.857– 249.275	US 190 east (Airline Highway) – Baton Rouge	Interchange; southern end of US 190 concurrency
West Baton Rouge		154.379	248.449	LA 987-1 (Bridgeside Road)	Western terminus of LA 987-1
West Baton Rouge	Lobdell	157.239– 157.272	253.052– 253.105	LA 415 (Plantation Avenue, Loop Road) to I-10	Interchange
West Baton Rouge	Lobdell	157.863– 158.045	254.056– 254.349	LA 415 Spur south (North Lobdell Highway) to I-10 / I-12	Northern terminus of LA 415 Spur; northbound entrance and southbound exit
West Baton Rouge	Westover	158.663	255.343	LA 1145 south (Calumet Road)	Northern terminus of LA 1145
West Baton Rouge		162.610	261.695	LA 983 north (Bueche Road)	Southern terminus of LA 983
West Baton Rouge	Erwinville	167.275	269.203	LA 413 (Poydras Bayou Drive) to I-10 – Lakeland, Rosedale	To False River
Pointe Coupee		169.065– 169.304	272.084– 272.468	US 190 west (Airline Highway) – Opelousas	Northern end of US 190 concurrency
Pointe Coupee	Knapp	173.488– 173.562	279.202– 279.321	LA 416 – Lakeland	Western terminus of LA 416
Pointe Coupee	Oscar	175.957	283.175	LA 978 (Bigman Lane)	Northern terminus of LA 978
Pointe Coupee	Parlange	177.516	285.684	LA 78 south (Parlange Lane) – Opelousas	Northern terminus of LA 78
Pointe Coupee	New Roads	181.751	292.500	LA 1 Bus. north (West Main Street) – New Roads	Southern terminus of LA 1 Bus.
Pointe Coupee	New Roads	183.538	295.376	LA 1 Bus. south / LA 10 east – St. Francisville	Northern terminus of LA 1 Bus.; southern end of LA 10 concurrency
Pointe Coupee	Labarre	187.438	301.652	LA 420 east (Pointe Coupee Road)	Western terminus of LA 420
Pointe Coupee	Morganza	191.350	307.948	LA 10 west (Fordoche Bayou Road)	Northern end of LA 10 concurrency
Pointe Coupee		194.011– 194.799	312.230– 313.499	Bridge over Morganza Spillway	
Pointe Coupee	Lacour Spur	196.698	316.555	LA 972	Western terminus of LA 972
Pointe Coupee	Batchelor	199.457	320.995	LA 419	
Pointe Coupee	Innis	202.281	325.540	LA 418 – Angola Ferry	
Pointe Coupee	Lettsworth	206.079	331.652	LA 971	Western terminus of LA 971
Pointe Coupee	Keller	207.631	334.150	LA 15 north / LA 970 – Old River Lock, Angola Ferry	Southern terminus of LA 15
Pointe Coupee	Legonier	212.632	342.198	LA 418	Northern terminus of LA 418
Pointe Coupee–Avoyelles parish line	Legonier–Simmesport line	212.783– 213.533	342.441– 343.648	Bridge over Atchafalaya River	
Avoyelles	Simmesport	213.681– 231.711	343.886– 372.903	LA 105 south (South Martin Luther King Drive) – Avoyelles Parish Port	Northern terminus of LA 105
Avoyelles		215.598	346.971	LA 1183	Northern terminus of LA 1183
Avoyelles		222.379	357.884	LA 114 west / LA 451 – Hamburg, Moreauville	Eastern terminus of LA 114; southern terminus of LA 451
Avoyelles	Moreauville	224.923	361.978	LA 451 (Bayou Des Glaises Street) – Moreauville, Bordelonville	
Avoyelles		227.384	365.939	LA 1186	Eastern terminus of LA 1186
Avoyelles	Mansura	229.701	369.668	LA 107 south (L'Eglise Street) – Mansura	Southern end of LA 107 concurrency
Avoyelles	Marksville	232.919	374.847	LA 452 (South Preston Street)	Southern terminus of LA 452
Avoyelles	Marksville	233.026	375.019	LA 1189 (Acton Road)	
Avoyelles	Marksville	233.592	375.930	LA 107 north / LA 115 (South Main Street) – Hessmer, Effie	Northern end of LA 107 concurrency
Avoyelles		236.286	380.265	LA 1191	Western terminus of LA 1191
Avoyelles		237.170	381.688	LA 1192	Western terminus of LA 1192
Avoyelles		238.434	383.722	LA 453 – Hickory Hill	Southern terminus of LA 453
Avoyelles		239.044	384.704	LA 1195	Southern terminus of LA 1195
Avoyelles	Fifth Ward	240.898	387.688	LA 1194	Western terminus of LA 1194; to Grand Cote National Wildlife Refuge
Avoyelles	Fifth Ward	241.186	388.151	LA 1194 Spur (Schoolhouse Road)	Western terminus of LA 1194 Spur (signed as LA 1194)
Avoyelles		243.937	392.579	LA 114 east – Hessmer	Western terminus of LA 114
Rapides	Roxana	247.325	398.031	LA 457 north	Eastern terminus of LA 457
Rapides	Richland	250.923	403.821	LA 1198 (Hathorne Road)	Southern terminus of LA 1198
Rapides	Whittington	252.433	406.252	LA 3170 west to I-49	Eastern terminus of LA 3170
Rapides	Latanier	254.850	410.141	LA 457	To Louisiana State University at Alexandria
Rapides	Alexandria	262.514	422.475	LA 1208-1 (Willow Glen River Road) to I-49	Northern terminus of LA 1208-1
Rapides	Alexandria	264.467– 264.569	425.618– 425.783	I-49 south / US 71 Byp. south / US 167 south – Opelousas US 167 north / LA 28 east (Pineville Expressway) US 167 Bus. / LA 28 Bus. begin	Exit 84 on I-49; northern terminus of US 167 Bus.; eastern terminus of LA 28 Bus.; southern end of US 167 Bus. and LA 28 Bus. concurrencies
Rapides	Alexandria	264.910– 264.945	426.331– 426.388	US 167 Bus. south (Mason Street, Overton Street)	Northern end of US 167 Bus. concurrency; one-way pair
Rapides	Alexandria	265.312	426.978	US 165 Bus. north / LA 1208-3 (Jackson Street) to I-49	Southern end of US 165 Bus. concurrency; northern terminus of LA 1208-3
Rapides	Alexandria	265.683	427.575	LA 28 Bus. west (Monroe Street)	Northern end of LA 28 Bus. concurrency
Rapides	Alexandria	266.442– 266.856	428.797– 429.463	US 71 / US 165 / LA 28 west (MacArthur Drive) to I-49 – Monroe, Baton Rouge, Lake Charles US 165 Bus. ends	Exit 70 on US 71; southern terminus of US 165 Bus.; northern end of US 165 Bus. concurrency
Rapides	Alexandria	268.696	432.424	LA 498 Spur (Powell Lane)	Northern terminus of LA 498 Spur
Rapides	Alexandria	269.974– 270.184	434.481– 434.819	LA 498 (Airbase Road) to I-49	To Alexandria International Airport and England Airpark
Rapides	Boyce	274.266	441.388	PR 23 (Rapides Station Road) to I-49	Exit 94 on I-49; location also known as Rapides
Rapides	Boyce	278.179– 278.745	447.686– 448.597	I-49 south – Alexandria	Exit 98 on I-49; access from LA 1 (both directions) to I-49 south and from I-49 north to LA 1 north
Rapides	Boyce	279.335	449.546	LA 1200 west (Haywood B. Joiner Sr. Street) to I-49	Eastern terminus of LA 1200
Rapides		280.915	452.089	LA 121 south	Northern terminus of LA 121; to Cotile Lake
Rapides	Rodemacher	282.832	455.174	LA 8 Spur to I-49 / LA 8 west – Leesville	Exit 103 on I-49; eastern terminus of LA 8 Spur (signed as LA 8)
Natchitoches		289.022	465.136	LA 3279 north (Parish Road) – Marco	Southern terminus of LA 3279
Natchitoches	Galbraith	291.023	468.356	LA 490 east – Marco	Southern end of LA 490 concurrency
Natchitoches		293.400	472.182	LA 490 west – Chopin	Northern end of LA 490 concurrency
Natchitoches		296.496– 296.527	477.164– 477.214	LA 495 north	Eastern terminus of LA 495
Natchitoches	Cloutierville	298.298– 298.350	480.064– 480.148	LA 491 north	Southern terminus of LA 491 (signed as LA 495)
Natchitoches	Derry	299.921	482.676	LA 119 – Gorum	To Kisatchie National Forest
Natchitoches	Montrose	303.729	488.804	LA 493 west – Red Dirt	Southern end of LA 493 concurrency; to Kisatchie National Forest
Natchitoches	Montrose	304.085	489.377	LA 493 north (Parish Road)	Northern end of LA 493 concurrency
Natchitoches	Cypress	307.652	495.118	LA 120 west to I-49 LA 494 east – Bermuda	Eastern terminus of LA 120; western terminus of LA 494
Natchitoches	Natchez	311.890	501.938	LA 119 south – Bermuda	Northern terminus of LA 119
Natchitoches	Natchitoches	314.390	505.962	LA 478 west	Eastern terminus of LA 478
Natchitoches		315.750	508.150	LA 1 Bus. north – Natchitoches	Southern terminus of LA 1 Bus.
Natchitoches	Natchitoches	319.789– 319.807	514.651– 514.679	LA 6 west / LA 6 Bus. east (University Parkway) to I-49 – Natchitoches, Many	Western terminus of LA 6 Bus.; southern end of LA 6 concurrency; to Northwestern State University
Natchitoches	Natchitoches	321.338	517.143	LA 1 Bus. south / LA 3191 north (Texas Street)	Northern terminus of LA 1 Bus.; southern terminus of LA 3191
Natchitoches	Natchitoches	321.768	517.835	LA 6 east (Highway 3175 Bypass) – Clarence, Winnfield	Northern end of LA 6 concurrency
Natchitoches		324.453	522.156	LA 3191 south	Northern terminus of LA 3191
Natchitoches	Powhatan	331.224	533.053	LA 485 south – Allen	Northern terminus of LA 485
Red River	Lake End	338.152	544.203	LA 174 west to I-49 – Pleasant Hill	Eastern terminus of LA 174
Red River	Armistead	345.638	556.250	US 84 east / US 371 – Coushatta	Southern end of US 84 concurrency
Red River	Gahagan	348.451	560.778	LA 177 south – Evelyn	Northern terminus of LA 177
Red River	Grand Bayou	353.683	569.198	US 84 west – Mansfield, Logansport	Northern end of US 84 concurrency
Red River		357.174	574.816	LA 509 south – Clear Lake	Northern terminus of LA 509
Caddo	Gayles	374.778	603.147	LA 175 south (Gayle Red Bluff Road) – Frierson	Northern terminus of LA 175
Caddo	Shreveport	380.740– 380.754	612.742– 612.764	LA 523 west (East Flournoy Lucas Road)	Eastern terminus of LA 523; location also known as Lucas
Caddo	Shreveport	383.133	616.593	LA 526 (Bert Kouns Industrial Loop Expressway) to I-49	
Caddo	Shreveport	384.022	618.024	LA 511 (East 70th Street)	
Caddo	Shreveport	386.594	622.163	LA 3032 east (East Kings Highway) – Bossier City	Western terminus of LA 3032
Caddo	Shreveport	389.038– 389.513	626.096– 626.860	I-20 / US 71 south to I-49 – Monroe, Dallas	Exit 19A on I-20; southern end of US 71 concurrency
Caddo	Shreveport	389.809	627.337	US 79 / US 80 (Texas Street)	
Caddo	Shreveport	390.035	627.700	LA 173 north (Caddo Street)	Southern terminus of LA 173
Caddo	Shreveport	390.275– 390.301	628.087– 628.129	Airport Drive – Shreveport Downtown Airport	
Caddo	Shreveport	390.815	628.956	LA 3036 west (North Common Street) to I-20	Eastern terminus of LA 3036
Caddo	Shreveport	391.474	630.016	LA 3049 north (North Thomas Drive)	Southern terminus of LA 3049
Caddo	Shreveport	391.868– 391.876	630.650– 630.663	LA 3094 south (North Hearne Avenue)	Northern terminus of LA 3094; to Shreveport Downtown Airport via North Hearne Avenue northbound
Caddo	Shreveport	393.066– 393.504	632.578– 633.283	I-220 to I-49 south – Monroe, Dallas	Exit 7A on I-220
Caddo	Shreveport	393.584– 393.645	633.412– 633.510	LA 3194 west (Martin Luther King Jr. Drive)	Eastern terminus of LA 3194; to Southern University
Caddo	Shreveport	395.093– 396.296	635.841– 637.777	US 71 north	Interchange; northern end of US 71 concurrency
Caddo	Shreveport	395.371– 395.637	636.288– 636.716	Pine Hill Road – Blanchard	
Caddo		397.491– 397.705	639.700– 640.044	I-49 – Shreveport, Texarkana	Exit 215 on I-49
Caddo	Blanchard	398.320– 398.348	641.034– 641.079	LA 538 (Old Mooringsport Road)	
Caddo	Blanchard	401.529	646.198	LA 173 (Dixie-Blanchard Road) – Blanchard, Dixie	
Caddo		406.522	654.234	LA 169 (Dixie-Mooringsport Road) – Mooringsport, Dixie	To Caddo Lake Dam
Caddo		407.769– 407.951	656.241– 656.533	Bridge over Caddo Lake	
Caddo		409.116– 409.149	658.408– 658.461	LA 538	
Caddo	Oil City	411.549	662.324	LA 530 east (Allen Street) – Belcher	Western terminus of LA 530
Caddo		414.772	667.511	LA 538 south	Northern terminus of LA 538
Caddo		416.015– 416.045	669.511– 669.560	LA 2 west (Trees City Road) – Jefferson, TX	Southern end of LA 2 concurrency
Caddo	Vivian	419.479	675.086	LA 2 east / LA 170 east (Camp Road)	Northern end of LA 2 concurrency; southern end of LA 170 concurrency
Caddo	Vivian	420.431	676.618	LA 170 west (West Tennessee Avenue)	Northern end of LA 170 concurrency
Caddo	Rodessa	427.398	687.830	LA 168 east (East Main Street) – Ida	Western terminus of LA 168
Caddo		431.877	695.039	SH 77 west – Atlanta	Northern terminus; continuation in Texas
1.000 mi = 1.609 km; 1.000 km = 0.621 mi: Concurrency terminus; Incomplete access

== Special routes ==
=== Natchitoches business route ===
Louisiana Highway 1 Business
- Location: Natchitoches
- Length: 4.767 mi (7.672 km)
- Existed: 1975–present

In Natchitoches, LA 1 Bus. follows the original route of LA 1 before its re-routing onto a bypass on the south and west side of town in 1975.

The entire highway is in Natchitoches Parish.

Location	mi	km	Destinations	Notes
	0.000	0.000	LA 1 – Alexandria, Shreveport	Southern terminus
Natchitoches	1.003	1.614	LA 1223 north (Rapides Drive)	Southern terminus of LA 1223
Natchitoches	2.148	3.457	LA 494 west (Keyser Avenue)	Southern end of LA 494 concurrency
Natchitoches	2.304	3.708	LA 494 east (Keyser Avenue)	Northern end of LA 494 concurrency
Natchitoches	2.772	4.461	LA 1224 east (Williams Avenue)	Western terminus of LA 1224
Natchitoches	2.782– 2.867	4.477– 4.614	Bridge over Cane River Lake	
Natchitoches	2.874	4.625	LA 6 Bus. (Front Street) – Clarence, Winnfield	
Natchitoches	4.736– 4.767	7.622– 7.672	LA 1 / LA 6 – Alexandria, Shreveport LA 3191 north (Texas Street)	Northern terminus of LA 1 Bus.; southern terminus of LA 3191
1.000 mi = 1.609 km; 1.000 km = 0.621 mi: Concurrency terminus

=== New Roads business route ===
Louisiana Highway 1 Business
- Location: New Roads
- Length: 4.924 mi (7.924 km)
- Existed: 2010–present

In New Roads, LA 1 Bus. follows the original route of LA 1 through the town center before its re-routing onto the former LA 3131. The route was bypassed in 2010 when construction of the new John James Audubon Bridge over the Mississippi River led to a realignment of highway routes in the area.

The entire highway is in Pointe Coupee Parish.

Location	mi	km	Destinations	Notes
New Roads	0.000	0.000	LA 1 south (False River Drive) – Baton Rouge, Opelousas LA 1 (Hospital Road) to LA 10 – Morganza, Alexandria	Southern terminus; to False River Regional Airport
New Roads	1.852	2.981	LA 413 (East Main Street)	Northern terminus of LA 413
New Roads	2.421	3.896	LA 10 Bus. east (New Roads Street) – St. Francisville	Southern end of LA 10 Bus. concurrency
	4.017	6.465	LA 10 east – St. Francisville LA 10 Bus. ends	Northern end of LA 10 Bus. concurrency; southern end of LA 10 concurrency; western terminus of LA 10 Bus.
New Roads	4.924	7.924	LA 1 south (Hospital Road) – Baton Rouge, Opelousas LA 1 north / LA 10 west – Morganza, Alexandria	Northern terminus; northern end of LA 10 concurrency
1.000 mi = 1.609 km; 1.000 km = 0.621 mi: Concurrency terminus

== See also ==
- LA 308, which follows the opposite bank of Bayou Lafourche south of Donaldsonville
- LA 3235, a bypass between Golden Meadow and Larose
