= Angola Transfer Company =

The Angola Transfer Company, organized in November 1906, was a railroad car float operation that primarily ferried cars of the Louisiana Railway and Navigation Company across the Mississippi River between Angola and Naples, Louisiana. The route was shortened to Angola–Torras in 1928 when a joint highway–rail bridge was built across the Atchafalaya River at Simmesport. The LR&N took over the Angola Transfer Company's property in 1929, concurrently with its lease to the Louisiana and Arkansas Railway. The L&A absorbed the LR&N in 1934 and abandoned the car float in 1940 after the Huey P. Long Bridge opened at Baton Rouge.

The Angola Ferry used to operate nearby, carrying automobiles across the Mississippi; its west landing is about 2 miles (3.2 km) south of the old Torras landing of the L&A.
