= Louisiana Highway 574 =

State highway in Louisiana, United States

Louisiana Highway 574

- Routes of the current sections of LA 574 in red

Route information
- Maintained by Louisiana DOTD
- Existed: 1955 renumbering–present

Location
- Country: United States
- State: Louisiana
- Parishes: Jefferson

Highway system
- Louisiana State Highway System; Interstate; US; State; Scenic
← LA 573	→ LA 575

Louisiana Highway 574 (LA 574) is a collection of eight current and four former state-maintained streets in Grand Isle, located in lower Jefferson Parish. All twelve routes were established with the 1955 Louisiana Highway renumbering.

== Current routes ==
=== Louisiana Highway 574-1 ===
Louisiana Highway 574-1
- Location: Grand Isle
- Length: 0.66 mi (1,060 m)
- Existed: 1955–present

Louisiana Highway 574-1 (LA 574-1) spans 0.66 miles (1.06 km) from south to north along Central Avenue. While in the Grand Isle city limits, the route is actually on Cheniere Caminada, the last part of the mainland approaching the bridge to Grand Isle. Ending at dead ends in both directions, LA 574-1 crosses LA 1 immediately to the west of the Caminada Pass bridge.

The entire highway is in Grand Isle, Jefferson Parish.

mi	km	Destinations	Notes
0.00	0.00	Dead end at canal southwest of Collins Lane	Southern terminus
0.30	0.48	LA 1	
0.66	1.06	Dead end at Caminada Bay	Northern terminus
1.000 mi = 1.609 km; 1.000 km = 0.621 mi

=== Louisiana Highway 574-3 ===
Louisiana Highway 574-3
- Location: Grand Isle
- Length: 0.41 mi (660 m)
- Existed: 1955–present

Louisiana Highway 574-3 (LA 574-3) spans 0.41 miles (0.66 km) from south to north along Santiny Lane. From the south, LA 574-3 begins at an intersection with LA 1 and ends at a dead end just to the north.

The entire highway is in Grand Isle, Jefferson Parish.

mi	km	Destinations	Notes
0.00	0.00	LA 1	Southern terminus
0.41	0.66	Dead end at canal south of Bayou Rigaud	Northern terminus
1.000 mi = 1.609 km; 1.000 km = 0.621 mi

=== Louisiana Highway 574-4 ===
Louisiana Highway 574-4
- Location: Grand Isle
- Length: 0.40 mi (640 m)
- Existed: 1955–present

Louisiana Highway 574-4 (LA 574-4) spans 0.40 miles (0.64 km) from south to north along Chighizola Lane. From the south, LA 574-4 begins at an intersection with LA 1 and ends at a dead end just to the north.

The entire highway is in Grand Isle, Jefferson Parish.

mi	km	Destinations	Notes
0.00	0.00	LA 1	Southern terminus
0.40	0.64	Dead end at canal south of Bayou Rigaud	Northern terminus
1.000 mi = 1.609 km; 1.000 km = 0.621 mi

=== Louisiana Highway 574-5 ===
Louisiana Highway 574-5
- Location: Grand Isle
- Length: 0.31 mi (500 m)
- Existed: 1955–present

Louisiana Highway 574-5 (LA 574-5) spans 0.31 miles (0.50 km) from south to north along Ludwig Lane. From the south, LA 574-5 begins at an intersection with LA 1 and proceeds north to Medical Avenue.

The entire highway is in Grand Isle, Jefferson Parish.

mi	km	Destinations	Notes
0.00	0.00	LA 1	Southern terminus
0.31	0.50	Medical Avenue	Northern terminus
1.000 mi = 1.609 km; 1.000 km = 0.621 mi

=== Louisiana Highway 574-6 ===
Louisiana Highway 574-6
- Location: Grand Isle
- Length: 0.31 mi (500 m)
- Existed: 1955–present

Louisiana Highway 574-6 (LA 574-6) spans 0.31 miles (0.50 km) from south to north along Naccari Lane. From the south, LA 574-6 begins at an intersection with LA 1 and ends at a dead end just to the north.

The entire highway is in Grand Isle, Jefferson Parish.

mi	km	Destinations	Notes
0.00	0.00	LA 1	Southern terminus
0.31	0.50	Dead end at canal south of Bayou Rigaud	Northern terminus
1.000 mi = 1.609 km; 1.000 km = 0.621 mi

=== Louisiana Highway 574-7 ===
Louisiana Highway 574-7
- Location: Grand Isle
- Length: 0.25 mi (400 m)
- Existed: 1955–present

Louisiana Highway 574-7 (LA 574-7) spans 0.25 miles (0.40 km) from south to north along Hector Lane. From the south, LA 574-7 begins at an intersection with LA 1 and ends at a dead end just to the north.

The entire highway is in Grand Isle, Jefferson Parish.

mi	km	Destinations	Notes
0.00	0.00	LA 1	Southern terminus
0.25	0.40	Dead end south of Louisiana Avenue	Northern terminus
1.000 mi = 1.609 km; 1.000 km = 0.621 mi

=== Louisiana Highway 574-8 ===
Louisiana Highway 574-8
- Location: Grand Isle
- Length: 0.28 mi (450 m)
- Existed: 1955–present

Louisiana Highway 574-8 (LA 574-8) spans 0.28 miles (0.45 km) from south to north along Landry Lane. From the south, LA 574-8 begins at an intersection with LA 1 and ends at a dead end just to the north.

The entire highway is in Grand Isle, Jefferson Parish.

mi	km	Destinations	Notes
0.00	0.00	LA 1	Southern terminus
0.28	0.45	Dead end south of Louisiana Avenue	Northern terminus
1.000 mi = 1.609 km; 1.000 km = 0.621 mi

=== Louisiana Highway 574-9 ===
Louisiana Highway 574-9
- Location: Grand Isle
- Length: 0.18 mi (290 m)
- Existed: 1955–present

Louisiana Highway 574-9 (LA 574-9) spans 0.18 miles (0.29 km) from south to north along Cemetery Lane. From the south, LA 574-9 begins at an intersection with LA 1 and ends at a dead end just to the north.

The entire highway is in Grand Isle, Jefferson Parish.

mi	km	Destinations	Notes
0.00	0.00	LA 1	Southern terminus
0.18	0.29	Dead end near Wolkpak Avenue	Northern terminus
1.000 mi = 1.609 km; 1.000 km = 0.621 mi

== Former routes ==
=== Louisiana Highway 574-2 ===
Louisiana Highway 574-2
- Location: Grand Isle
- Length: 0.1 mi (160 m)
- Existed: 1955–1987

Louisiana Highway 574-2 (LA 574-2) spanned 0.1 miles (0.16 km) from south to north along Burnett Lane. It began at the shore of the Gulf of Mexico and proceeded north to an intersection with LA 1 immediately to the southeast of the Caminada Pass bridge.

The route was deleted and returned to local control in 1987.

The entire highway was in Grand Isle, Jefferson Parish.

mi	km	Destinations	Notes
0.00	0.00	Dead end at Gulf of Mexico	Southern terminus
0.10	0.16	LA 1	Northern terminus
1.000 mi = 1.609 km; 1.000 km = 0.621 mi

=== Louisiana Highway 574-10 ===
Louisiana Highway 574-10
- Location: Grand Isle
- Length: 0.29 mi (470 m)
- Existed: 1955–1972

Louisiana Highway 574-10 (LA 574-10) spanned 0.29 miles (0.47 km) from south to north along Minnich Lane. It began at an intersection with LA 1 and proceeded north to Louisiana Avenue.

LA 574-10 was renumbered to LA 3150 in 1972.

The entire highway was in Grand Isle, Jefferson Parish.

mi	km	Destinations	Notes
0.00	0.00	LA 1	Southern terminus
0.29	0.47	Louisiana Avenue	Northern terminus
1.000 mi = 1.609 km; 1.000 km = 0.621 mi

=== Louisiana Highway 574-11 ===
Louisiana Highway 574-11
- Location: Grand Isle
- Length: 1.1 mi (1.8 km)
- Existed: 1955–1972

Louisiana Highway 574-11 (LA 574-11) spanned 1.1 miles (1.8 km) from south to north along Humble Lane. It began at an intersection with LA 1 at the Gulf of Mexico, proceeded northeast parallel to LA 1, and ended at a second intersection with LA 1.

LA 574-11 was renumbered to LA 3151 in 1972.

The entire highway was in Grand Isle, Jefferson Parish.

mi	km	Destinations	Notes
0.0	0.0	LA 1	Southern terminus
1.1	1.8	LA 1	Northern terminus
1.000 mi = 1.609 km; 1.000 km = 0.621 mi

=== Louisiana Highway 574-12 ===
Louisiana Highway 574-12
- Location: Grand Isle
- Length: 0.90 mi (1,450 m)
- Existed: 1955–?

Louisiana Highway 574-12 (LA 574-12) spanned 0.90 miles (1.45 km) from south to north along Admiral Craik Drive. It began at an intersection with LA 1 and proceeded north to a dead end at Barataria Pass.

LA 574-12 has been returned to local control.

The entire highway is in Grand Isle, Jefferson Parish.

mi	km	Destinations	Notes
0.00	0.00	LA 1	Southern terminus
0.90	1.45	Dead end at Barataria Pass	Northern terminus
1.000 mi = 1.609 km; 1.000 km = 0.621 mi
