= Lakeland, Louisiana =

Lakeland
- village
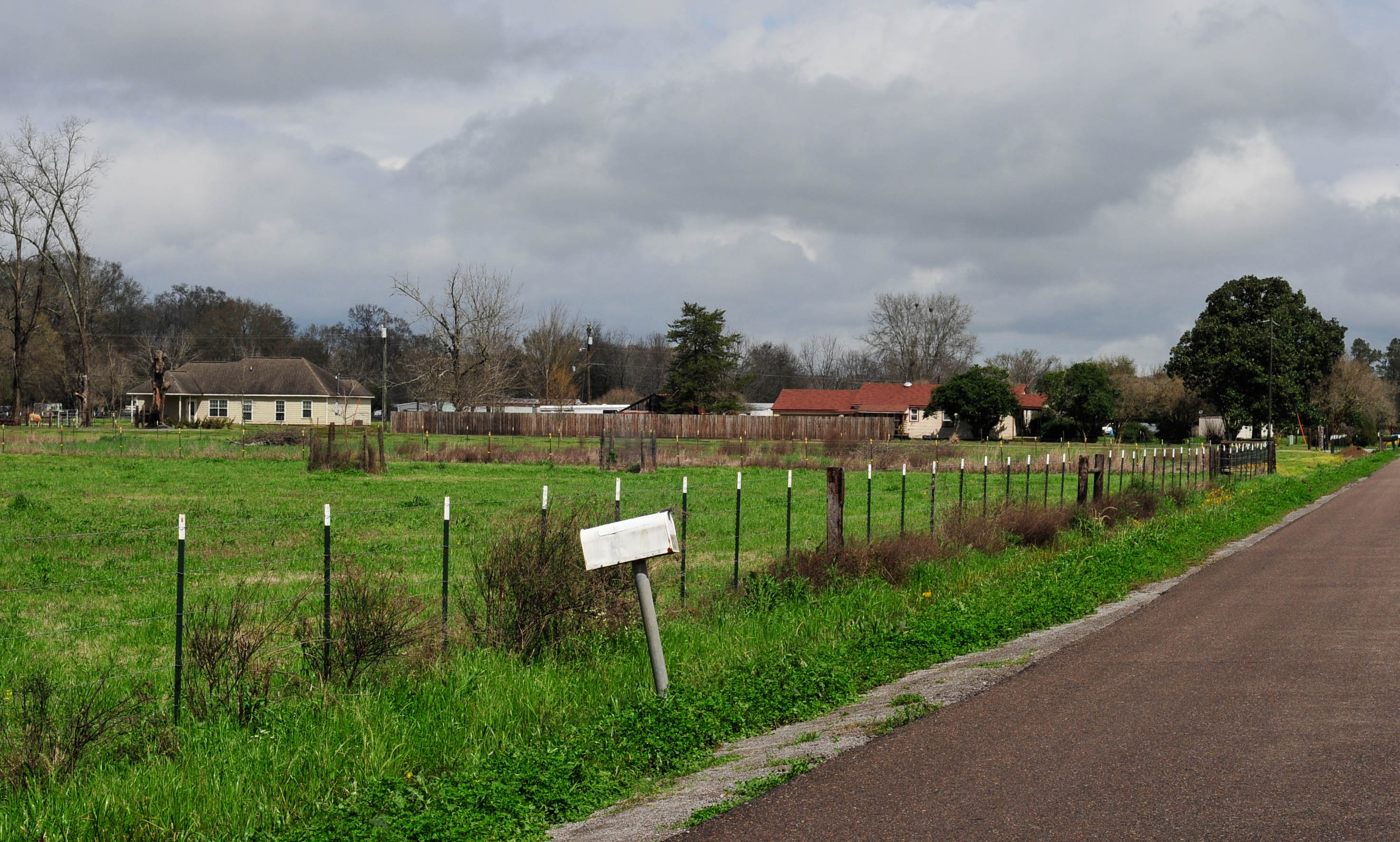

- Location of Lakeland in Louisiana
- Coordinates: 30°36′03″N 91°23′50″W
- Country: United States
- State: Louisiana
- Parish: Pointe Coupee
- Elevation: 30 ft (9.1 m)
- Time zone: UTC-6 (CST)
  - Summer (DST): UTC-5 (CDT)
- ZIP code: 70752
- Area code: 225
- GNIS feature ID: 543376
- FIPS code: 22-077

Lakeland (French: Terre-du-Lac), is a village in southeastern Pointe Coupee Parish, Louisiana United States. The area is home to several former slave plantations.

== Geography ==
Lakeland is located on False River, in the south-east of Pointe Coupee, 6 miles to the south of New Roads. It was a so-called post-village in the 19th century, served by the (now vanished) Abramson railway station 4 miles to the west, and comprising one church, four stores, and several cotton gins and sugar mills.

There are no officially designated boundaries to the community, but the area is more or less bounded by LA-416 on the northern edge of the area, Louisiana Highway 983 on the eastern edge, Louisiana Highway 1 on the western edge, and U.S. Highway 190 on the southern edge. This area is generally referred to as Lakeland. This area is home to Immaculate Conception Catholic Church and Alma Plantation Sugar Mill. The first post office in the area was established in 1878.

== Alma Plantation ==
Julien de Lallande Poydras one of Louisiana's most notable poets, planters and philanthropists purchased land in Lakeland in 1789 and named it Poydras' plantation. Poydras built a large home in the Lakeland area and called it Poydras Bayou. He owned four plantations around the Lakeland area and two in West Baton Rouge Parish. The Pointe Coupee plantations grew cotton and sugarcane and exported these to New Orleans. On May 4, 1795, the Pointe Coupée slave conspiracy occurred on other nearby Poydras plantations that resulted in 57 slaves and three white planters going on public trial. The controversy started when one of the farmers discovered a controversial book titled Theorie de l'impot written by a leader of the French Revolution named Count of Mirabeau in one of the slave cabins. The book contained Declaration of the Rights of Man and of the Citizen. The slaves were not allowed to have this book and were accused of attempting to organize and kill their masters. At the end of the trial 23 slaves were hung and beheaded and 31 were flogged and sentenced to hard labor. The three white planters were deported to Havana.

Poydras would often entertain guests at his plantations. According to some sources in 1798 Prince Louis Philippe I who later became King of France and Marigny de Mandeville were guests at his plantations.

Julien Poydras died in 1824 and the plantation was sold to David Barrow, the brother of Alexander Barrow. The plantation was renamed Alma plantation after the daughter of David Barrow. Then in 1859, George Pitcher became the plantation owner. The plantation was later purchased by Hampton P. Stewart in 1959 and has remained in this family for four generations.

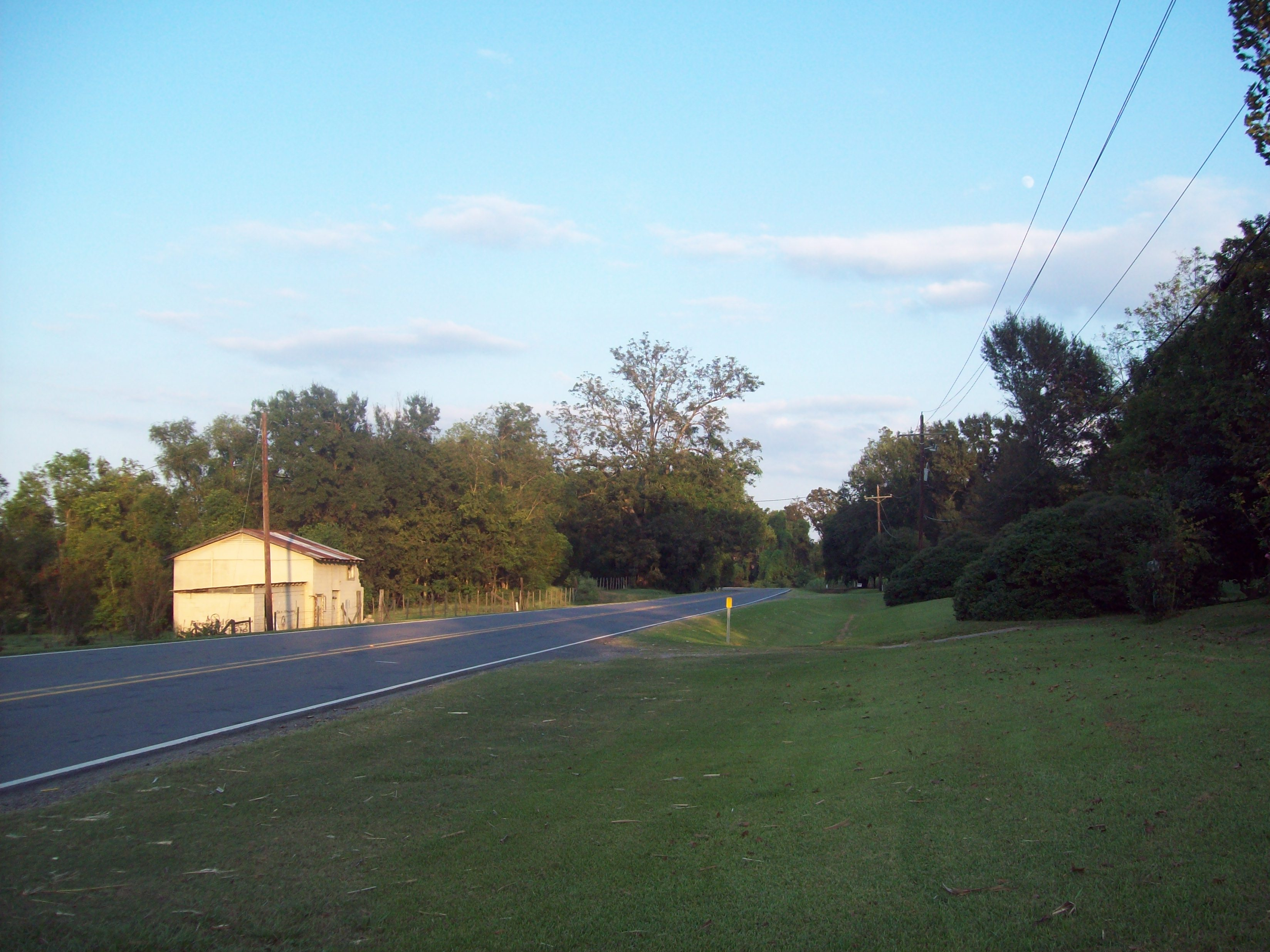
Picturesque scene along LA 416 in Lakeland, LA

== Historic catholic church ==
In 1853 one of the earliest Pointe Coupee churches was constructed in the nearby village of Chenal, Louisiana. Just a few decades later the church burned down to the ground. Twenty-four year old Father Louis Savoure, a native of Combourg made the decision to rebuild the church in Lakeland. The church became one of the largest in the parish. In 1882 there were an estimated 2500 parishioners and the church was named the Immaculate Conception.

== Hurricane four ==
In 1947 a powerful hurricane pushed inland and passed through Lakeland. Russel L. Honoré wrote that the hurricane passed through Lakeland just four days after he was born. The storm is now known as the 1947 Fort Lauderdale hurricane and it was responsible for killing fifty-one people in Louisiana and caused an estimated $110 million in damages. Honoré wrote that these early experiences growing up in Lakeland taught him the survival skills necessary to survive disasters. Honoré claims that his hard life growing up in Lakeland gave him the skills necessary to lead the Joint Task Force Katrina later in life.

== Education ==
There is one school in the area, Rougon Elementary School (formerly High School). The community was formerly home to the now defunct Lakeland Elementary School that was located on Louisiana Highway 413, south of Louisiana Highway 416.

== Major roadways ==
- Louisiana Highway 413
- Louisiana Highway 416
