= Hackley, Louisiana =

- Unincorporated community
- Location within Louisiana Location within the United States
- Coordinates: 30°58′34″N 90°05′08″W
- Country: United States
- State: Louisiana
- Parish: Washington
- Elevation: 341 ft (104 m)
- Time zone: UTC-6 (Central (CST))
  - Summer (DST): UTC-5 (CDT)
- Area code: 985
- GNIS feature ID: 535479
- FIPS code: 22-32440

Hackley is an unincorporated community in Washington Parish, Louisiana, United States. The community is located 9 miles (14.48 kilometres) N of Franklinton, Louisiana.

== Etymology ==
It is speculated that the name of the community is derived from the surname of Charles Hackley a timber baron who owned over 200,000 acres of land in Louisiana.

== Old railroad ==
Between 1892 and 1922 there was a 26.5 miles (42.65 kilometres) railroad built by the Brooks-Scanlon Lumber Company that ran from Kentwood, Louisiana and terminated at Hackley. The railroad was leased and operated by the Kentwood and Eastern Railway.
