= Angola Ferry =

Ferry service in Louisiana, United States

Coordinates: 30.9436°N 91.6534°W

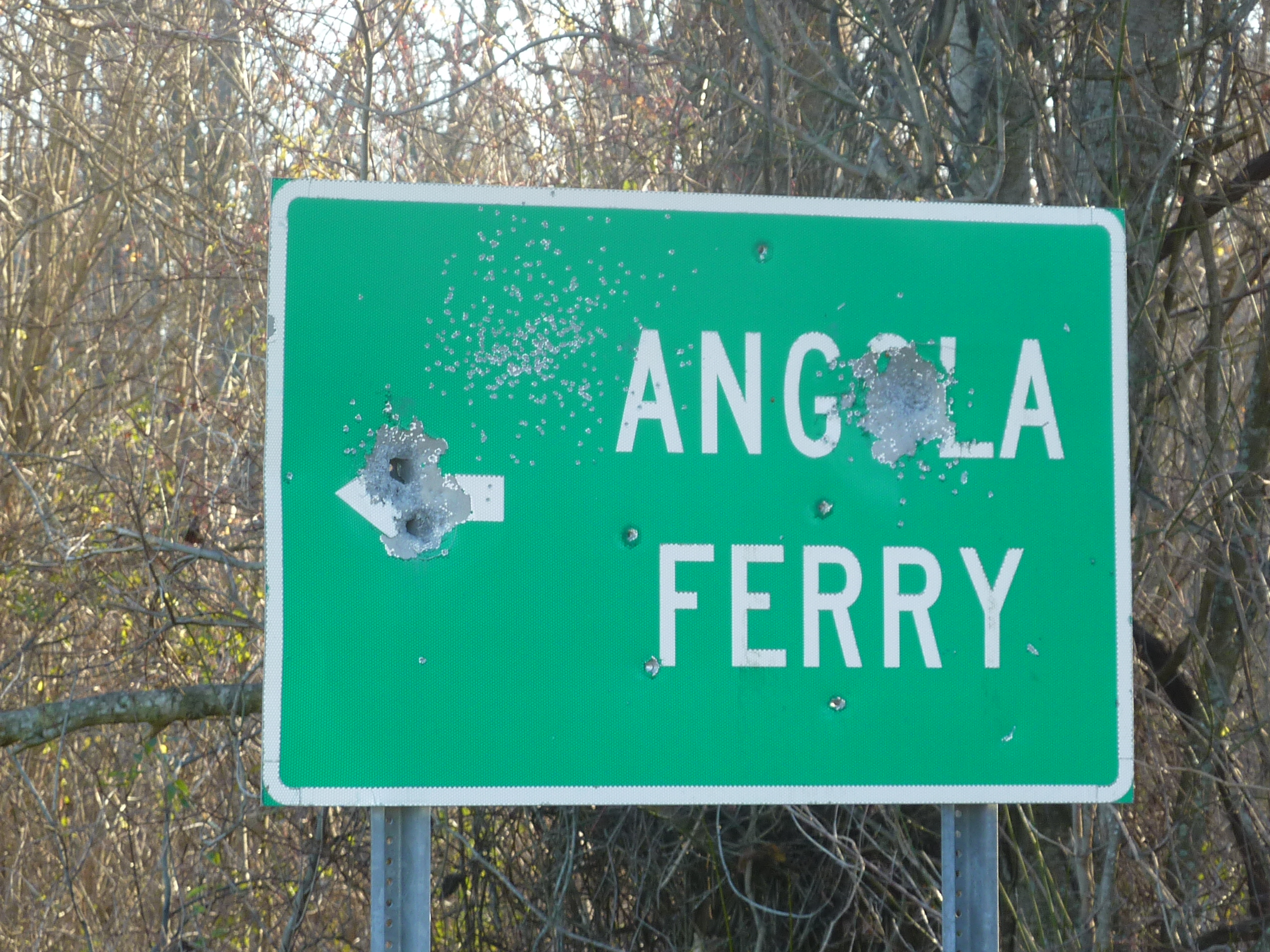

The Angola Ferry is a small and little-known ferry service that crossed the Mississippi River connecting Lettsworth, Louisiana with the Louisiana State Penitentiary, otherwise known as the Angola Prison. It's considered difficult to access, requiring drivers to branch off the Louisiana Highway 418 on an unmarked gravel road and traveling several hundred yards thereafter. A good portion of the area's population is unaware of its existence because it serves mainly prison personnel traveling to and from work and is not accessible to the general public.

The ferry was featured prominently in the 2001 film Monster's Ball.

Until 1940, a railroad car float crossed the river nearby, operated first by the Angola Transfer Company and then by the Louisiana and Arkansas Railway.

As of 2019, the Angola Ferry was operational, but only during certain hours of the day. .

== See also ==
- List of crossings of the Lower Mississippi River
