= Blairstown, Louisiana =

Unincorporated community in Louisiana

- Unincorporated community
- Location within Louisiana Location within the United States
- Coordinates: 30°45′10″N 90°57′45″W
- Country: United States
- State: Louisiana
- Parish: East Feliciana Parish
- Elevation: 174 ft (53 m)
- Time zone: UTC-6 (Central (CST))
  - Summer (DST): UTC-5 (CDT)
- ZIP code: 70722
- Area code: 225
- GNIS feature ID: 553708
- FIPS code: 22-07695

Blairstown is an unincorporated community in East Feliciana Parish, Louisiana, United States. The community is located less than 4 miles (6.4 kilometres) north of Pride and 8 miles (13 kilometres) southeast of Clinton.

== Etymology ==
It is speculated that the community is named after John Insley Blair. In the fall of 1866 a Presbyterian missionary named Rev. John Arndt Reiley migrated to the community from Blairstown, New Jersey.
