= Rougon, Louisiana =

Unincorporated community in Louisiana

Rougon
- Unincorporated community
- Location of Rougon in Louisiana
- Coordinates: 30°36′03″N 91°23′50″W
- Country: United States
- State: Louisiana
- Parish: Pointe Coupee
- Elevation: 30 ft (9.1 m)
- Time zone: UTC-6 (CST)
  - Summer (DST): UTC-5 (CDT)
- ZIP code: 70773
- Area code: 225
- GNIS feature ID: 555842
- FIPS code: 22-66340

Rougon, (pronounced Rue Gahn) is an unincorporated community in southeastern Pointe Coupee Parish, Louisiana United States. The area is home to several plantation houses.

== History ==
The community was formerly home to the now defunct P. V. Rougon store built in 1881.

== Geography ==
There are no officially designated boundaries to the village, but the area is more or less bounded by Louisiana Highway 414 on the northern edge of the area, LA-983 on the western edge, a set of railroad tracks on the eastern edge, and southern Pointe Coupee Parish border on the southern edge. The zip code assigned to this area is 70773.

=== Major Roadways ===
- Louisiana Highway 983
- Louisiana Highway 416

== Education ==
There is one school in the area, Rougon Elementary School (formerly Rougon High School).
