= Hermitage, Louisiana =

Hermitage
- Unincorporated community
- Location of Hermitage in Louisiana
- Coordinates: 30°38′43″N 91°20′18″W
- Country: United States
- State: Louisiana
- Time zone: UTC-6 (CST)
  - Summer (DST): UTC-5 (CDT)

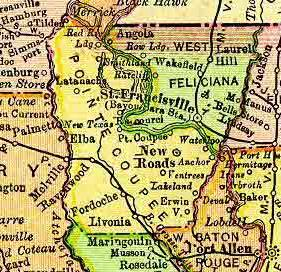
1895 map of Pointe Coupee Parish showing location of Hermitage

Hermitage was the name of a community located in southeastern Pointe Coupee Parish, Louisiana, United States. The community was located along the Mississippi River, near the Pointe Coupee - West Baton Rouge Parish line.

== History ==
The town was named for the home of President Andrew Jackson. A post office was established at the river community in 1851. L. P. Day owned and operated a store in the community before and during the American Civil War. Shortly after World War II, the post office was closed.
