= Erwinville, Louisiana =

- Unincorporated community
- Location within Louisiana Location within the United States
- Coordinates: 30°32′32″N 91°22′48″W
- Country: United States
- State: Louisiana
- Parish: West Baton Rouge

Area
  - Total: 9.52 sq mi (24.65 km^{2})
  - Land: 9.52 sq mi (24.65 km^{2})
  - Water: 0 sq mi (0.00 km^{2})
- Elevation: 20 ft (6.1 m)

Population (2020)
  - Total: 2,275
  - Density: 239.0/sq mi (92.27/km^{2})
- Time zone: UTC-6 (Central (CST))
  - Summer (DST): UTC-5 (CDT)
- ZIP code: 70729
- Area code: 225
- GNIS feature ID: 2586677

Erwinville is an unincorporated community and census-designated place in West Baton Rouge Parish, Louisiana, United States. As of the 2020 census, Erwinville had a population of 2,275. U.S. Route 190 passes through the community.

== Geography ==
According to the U.S. Census Bureau, the community has an area of 7.971 square miles (20.64 km^{2}), all land.

== Demographics ==
Historical population
Census	Pop.	Note	%±
2010	2,192		—
2020	2,275		3.8%
U.S. Decennial Census

Erwinville first appeared as a census designated place in the 2010 U.S. census. '

Erwinville racial composition as of 2020
Race	Number	Percentage
White (non-Hispanic)	1,466	64.44%
Black or African American (non-Hispanic)	622	27.34%
Native American	6	0.26%
Asian	10	0.44%
Other/Mixed	109	4.79%
Hispanic or Latino	62	2.73%

As of the 2020 United States census, there were 2,275 people, 918 households, and 640 families residing in the CDP.
