= Louisiana Highway 3114 =

State highway in Louisiana, United States

Louisiana Highway 3114
- Covington Bypass
- Route of LA 3114 in relation to modern roads

Route information
- Maintained by Louisiana DOTD
- Length: 1.7 mi (2.7 km)
- Existed: c. 1967–1971

Major junctions
- West end: US 190 near Covington
- East end: LA 25 near Covington

Location
- Country: United States
- State: Louisiana
- Parishes: St. Tammany

Highway system
- Louisiana State Highway System; Interstate; US; State; Scenic
← LA 3113	→ LA 3115

Louisiana Highway 3114 (LA 3114) was a state highway in Louisiana that served St. Tammany Parish. It spanned a total of 1.7 miles (2.7 km) along the present route of U.S. 190 on the north side of Covington.

== Route description ==
From the west, LA 3114 began at an intersection with U.S. 190 just northwest of the Covington city limits. It headed northeast to an intersection with LA 25. LA 3114 was an undivided, two-lane highway for its entire length.

== History ==
The Covington Bypass was conceived in the mid-1950s as part of a series of highway improvements associated with the construction of the Lake Pontchartrain Causeway. The bypass was to provide an alternate route around the downtown area for traffic on U.S. 190 and LA 25. Only half of the project was constructed at the time, the "eastern" segment from the Bogue Falaya River Bridge (at the current junction of U.S. 190, U.S. 190 Business, and LA 21) north to the current junction of U.S. 190 and LA 25. This segment was completed in 1957 and became the new routing of LA 25.

A decade later, in October 1967, construction began on the segment extending west from LA 25. This segment was designated as LA 3114 and was opened to traffic in January 1969. Two years later, it became the new routing of U.S. 190, and the old alignment through town became U.S. 190 Business. With this change, the LA 3114 designation was dropped, and LA 25 was truncated to its current terminus at U.S. 190 on the north side of Covington.

== Major junctions ==
The entire route was in St. Tammany Parish.

Location	mi	km	Destinations	Notes
	0.0	0.0	US 190	Western terminus
	1.6	2.6	LA 25	Eastern terminus
1.000 mi = 1.609 km; 1.000 km = 0.621 mi
