= Abita Springs Pavilion =

- U.S. National Register of Historic Places
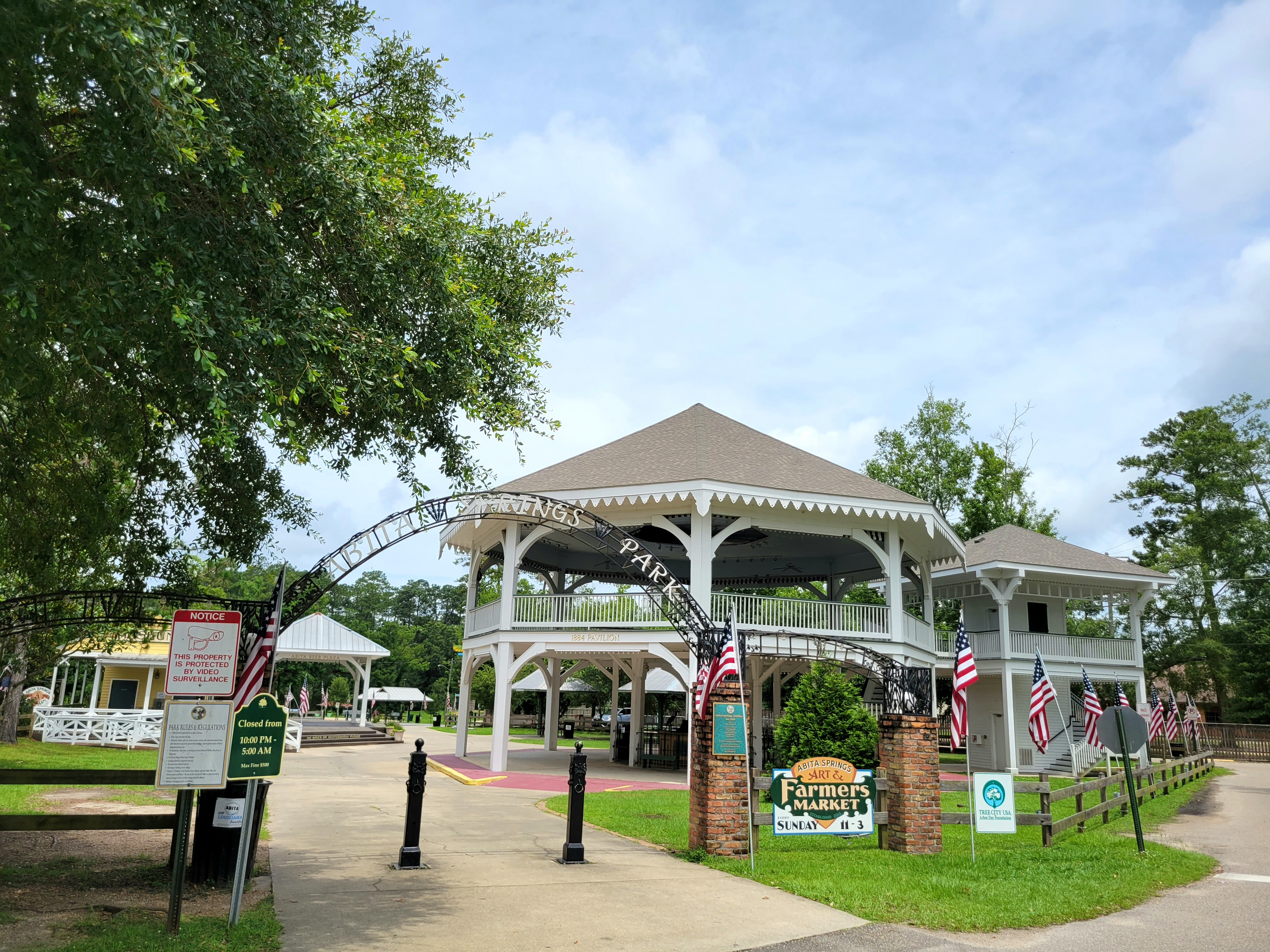

- Location within Louisiana Location within the United States
- Location: NW end of Main St., Abita Springs, Louisiana
- Coordinates: 30°28′48″N 90°2′25″W
- Area: less than one acre
- Built: 1888
- Built by: Poitivent & Favre
- Architectural style: Victorian
- NRHP reference No.: 75002062
- Added to NRHP: August 19, 1975

The Abita Springs Pavilion, at the northwestern end of Main Street in Abita Springs in St. Tammany Parish, Louisiana, was built in 1888. Thomas Sully designed it. It was listed on the National Register of Historic Places in 1975.

It is a Victorian-style bandstand pavilion which is 52.6 feet (16.0 m) in diameter and 46 feet (14 m) tall and was built by Poitivent and Farve in 1888. The 1975 National Register nomination noted that "At one time there was a long wooden foot bridge that went to the upper level. Railings that went around the upper level are now missing and should be replaced." and "The Springs themselves were cemented over by the State and should be opened. (The Pavilion is built over the Springs.)"

== See also ==
- Abita Springs Historic District, NRHP-listed later
