= Abita Springs Historic District =

- U.S. National Register of Historic Places
- U.S. Historic district
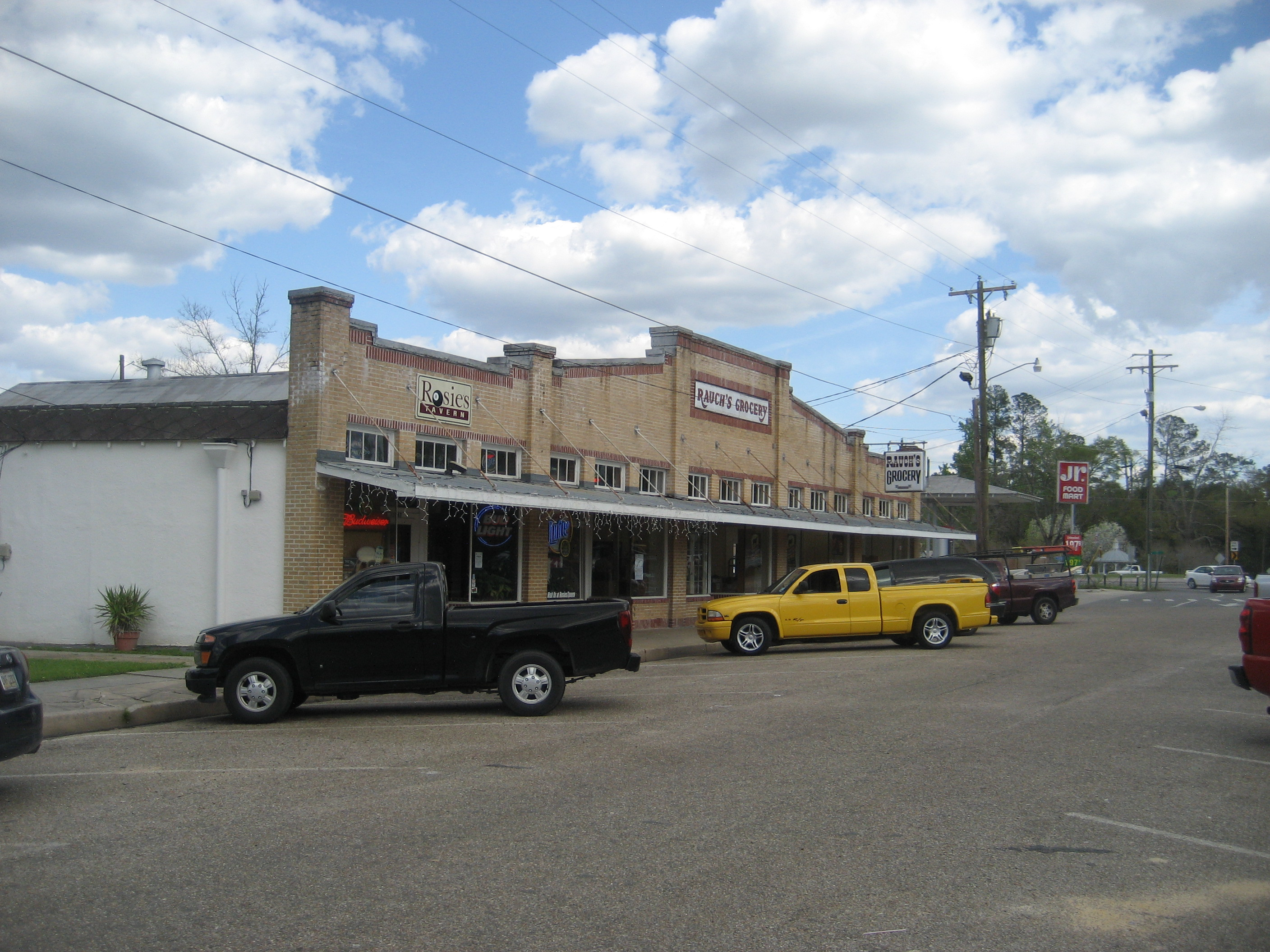

- Location within Louisiana Location within the United States
- Location: LA 36, LA 59, and LA 435, Abita Springs, Louisiana
- Coordinates: 30.476389°N 90.036944°W
- Area: 162 acres (66 ha)
- Built by: Multiple
- Architectural style: Colonial Revival, Stick/eastlake, Queen Anne
- NRHP reference No.: 82004622
- Added to NRHP: March 12, 1982

The Abita Springs Historic District, in Abita Springs in St. Tammany Parish, Louisiana, is a 162 acres (66 ha) historic district which was listed on the National Register of Historic Places in 1982. It included 180 contributing buildings. The district is significant for its association with the historical development of Abita Springs as a resort community and small town in St. Tammany Parish, as well as for its collection of buildings that reflect regional architectural traditions of the late nineteenth and early twentieth centuries.

The historic district features many different building styles and landscapes which together show how Abita Springs grew during its busiest early years. Abita Springs stands out for its open, wooded, and relaxed atmosphere. Buildings are spaced apart in a natural setting instead of being packed along busy streets. This gives the district its special character and shows how Abita Springs is a destination for health, relaxation, and recreation.

== History ==
The history of Abita Springs dates back to the natural springs that give the community its name. In the late nineteenth century, the little resort community was becoming a popular vacation destination as visitors discovered the health benefits of the spring water and woodland surroundings. Americans believed that clean air, natural mineral water, and rural surroundings improved their health. Diseases like yellow fever, which regularly plagued southern Louisiana, led people to flee larger cities in search of safer, healthier surroundings. Abita Springs developed in this context of relaxation, recuperation, and enjoyment of the environment.

The town's growth increased as well. With the arrival of the railroad in the late nineteenth century, Abita Springs would become more accessible to visitors and seasonal residents from nearby communities, such as New Orleans. Its railroad access also contributed significantly to the town's economy and physical development. It grew into a community of homes, boarding houses, shops, churches, and civic buildings. The district that survives today is evidence of this period of growth.

Abita Springs grew into a resort town and residential community. Some buildings served visitors directly, while others filled the needs of their residents. The result was a diverse built environment in the district. The district lacks grand buildings or public spaces. Instead, it is a large majority of modest buildings that show how the town was lived in. Houses, small businesses, churches, and other public buildings show how Abita Springs evolved through local patterns of settlement and use.

Health resorts started to lose popularity in the early 20th century, especially after World War I, as new medical knowledge, public health practices, and transportation infrastructure changed the landscape. While some things in Abita Springs changed over the years, much of the town stayed the same. Some buildings from when Abita Springs was at its height of growth remained. The preservation of these old buildings was one of the reasons the district has come to be considered a historically significant district.

== Architecture ==
Abita Springs Historic District is part of the region's small and intimate architecture.The majority of the buildings were constructed between 1900 and 1930, during Abita Springs' highest growth period. Most of the houses are shotgun or bungalows. Another type of house is the North Shore house which have wide porches and a design suited to the climate and lifestyle of southeastern Louisiana. Large porches are one of the most distinctive features of many buildings in the district. Porches served as a place to relax, provide shade, circulate air, and enjoy time outside. The architecture of the district is not only a matter of style, but also an expression of local climate, culture, and use.

== Legacy and Preservation ==
The Historic District of Abita Springs is an example of a small Louisiana town built on tourism and settlement. A combination of springs, the railroad, and the setting contribute to what makes Abita Springs unique. Much of its character has remained. Recent preservation efforts continue to help preserve the area's historic character. Design reviews and guidelines aim to preserve the look and architecture of the district while ensuring it remains a vibrant part of the town. The district serves as both a reminder of the past and an important part of Abita Springs’ history. Historic buildings remain in use and have helped keep the district at the center of the town's identity and shared memories.
