= Louisiana Highway 41 =

State highway in Louisiana, United States

Louisiana Highway 41

- Route of LA 41 highlighted in red

Route information
- Maintained by Louisiana DOTD
- Length: 23.074 mi (37.134 km)
- Existed: 1955 renumbering–present

Major junctions
- South end: US 11 / LA 3081 in Pearl River
- LA 36 in Hickory; LA 40 in Bush
- North end: LA 21 in Bush

Location
- Country: United States
- State: Louisiana
- Parishes: St. Tammany

Highway system
- Louisiana State Highway System; Interstate; US; State; Scenic
← LA 40	→ LA 42

Louisiana Highway 41 (LA 41) is a state highway located in St. Tammany Parish, Louisiana. It runs 23.07 miles (37.13 km) in a north–south direction from the junction of U.S. Highway 11 (US 11) and LA 3081 in Pearl River to LA 21 in Bush.

The route parallels the Louisiana–Mississippi state line, located along the Pearl River. It is essentially the middle link in a route connecting the Slidell area with the Washington Parish city of Bogalusa. Its southern terminus is located just west of an interchange at the convergence of Interstate 59 (I-59) and US 11 in the town of Pearl River. After traveling along the west side of the town's corporate limits, LA 41 heads north through the small unincorporated communities of Hickory, Talisheek, and Bush. LA 21 picks up the trajectory of LA 41 in Bush and continues toward Bogalusa.

LA 41 was designated in the 1955 Louisiana Highway renumbering from sections of former State Routes 58 and 484. In the late 1960s, a local road around the west side of Pearl River was improved as part of a realignment of LA 41, facilitating access to southbound I-59. The original alignment through town was designated as LA 41 Spur until being decommissioned in 2007.

== Route description ==
From the south, LA 41 begins at a junction with US 11 and LA 3081 in the St. Tammany Parish town of Pearl River. This junction consists of a four-way intersection with US 11 south (to Slidell), US 11 north (to I-59), and LA 3081 north (to the center of Pearl River). LA 41 heads northwest on Watts Road as an undivided two-lane highway with a center turning lane and proceeds to make a loop around the west side of town. Set amongst the thick pine forests are scattered homes and businesses, and the highway passes the entrances to the local high and junior high schools. About halfway along the way, the center lane is discontinued at an intersection with Pine Street. Crossing out of the Pearl River corporate limits, LA 41 intersects a local road known as Spur 41, a decommissioned state highway spur that still serves as the main route into the center of town from the north.

About two miles (3.2 km) north of Pearl River, LA 41 passes through the community of Hickory and intersects LA 36, which heads west toward Covington via Abita Springs. North of Hickory, the highway continues through a thin ribbon of scattered residential development as it winds between the Pearl River system to the east and rural St. Tammany Parish to the west. After 10.5 miles (16.9 km), LA 41 passes along the east side of a tiny community known as Talisheek, located at a junction with LA 435. Less than one mile (1.6 km) later, LA 435 Spur provides access to Talisheek for the benefit of southbound traffic as LA 41 makes a curve due north.

4.5 miles (7.2 km) north of Talisheek, LA 41 bends due west into the unincorporated community of Bush. After passing the local library branch, LA 41 reaches a T-intersection with westbound LA 40, which continues straight ahead toward Folsom and provides a convenient connection to southbound LA 21. From this junction, LA 41 turns north onto a divided four-lane highway and proceeds a short distance to its terminus at a direct connection with LA 21. Northbound LA 21 proceeds straight ahead on the four-lane highway toward the Washington Parish city of Bogalusa.

=== Route classification and data ===
LA 41 is classified by the Louisiana Department of Transportation and Development (La DOTD) as an urban minor arterial in Pearl River and as a rural minor arterial otherwise. The short four-lane section in Bush, however, is classified as a rural principal arterial. Daily traffic volume in 2013 peaked at 9,600 vehicles between Pearl River and Hickory. The remainder of the route generally averaged between 4,400 and 5,400 vehicles daily, with a low of 4,200 reported south of Talisheek. The posted speed limit is 45 mph (70 km/h) in Pearl River and 55 mph (90 km/h) otherwise.

== History ==
In the original Louisiana Highway system in use between 1921 and 1955, LA 41 was part of two different routes: State Route 58 from Pearl River to Talisheek and State Route 484 from Talisheek to Bush. Route 58 was designated in 1921 by an act of the state legislature as one of the first 98 state highway routes. While the modern LA 41 continues north at Talisheek, Route 58 turned west and followed what is now LA 435 to Abita Springs then LA 36 from Abita Springs to Covington. Route 484 was added to the state highway system in 1928, connecting Route 58 to Route 7 at Bush. Route 7 was the pre-1955 counterpart to LA 21 through the area and was the basis for the modern US 190 corridor through most of the state. The portions of Routes 58 and 484 between Pearl River and Bush were graveled by 1927 and paved in 1935. The alignment of the collective route remained virtually the same during the pre-1955 era.

LA 41 was created in the 1955 Louisiana Highway renumbering, applying a continuous route number between Pearl River and Bush.

La 41—From a junction with La-US 11 at or near Pearl River through or near Hickory to a junction with La 21 at or near Bush.

— 1955 legislative route description

Since the 1955 renumbering, only one significant change has been made to the alignment of LA 41. In the late 1960s, a slight bypass of Pearl River was created by improving the old Military Road around the west side of town, facilitating through traffic bound for I-59 south. The original alignment was retained as LA 41 Spur, a designation which also extended across US 11 to an interchange facilitating access between Pearl River and northbound I-59. In the early 1970s, two further improvements were made that streamlined the route of LA 41 through Talisheek. A new section of roadway was constructed to bypass a right-angle turn at the tiny community. The original road segment remained in the state highway system as LA 435 Spur (north–south portion) and a slight extension of LA 435 (east–west portion). A modest curve just south of Talisheek was also straightened at this time.

== Major intersections ==
The entire highway is in St. Tammany Parish.

Location	mi	km	Destinations	Notes
Pearl River	0.000	0.000	US 11 to I-59 – Slidell, Picayune LA 3081 north	Southern terminus of LA 41 and LA 3081
Pearl River	2.764	4.448	Spur 41 east – Pearl River	
Hickory	5.081	8.177	LA 36 west – Abita Springs	Eastern terminus of LA 36
Talisheek	15.673	25.223	LA 435 west – Abita Springs	Eastern terminus of LA 435
Talisheek	16.433	26.446	LA 435 Spur	Northern terminus of LA 435 Spur
Bush	22.451	36.131	LA 40 west – Folsom	Eastern terminus of LA 40
Bush	23.074	37.134	LA 21 – Covington, Bogalusa	Northern terminus
1.000 mi = 1.609 km; 1.000 km = 0.621 mi

== Spur route ==
=== Louisiana Highway 41 Spur ===
Louisiana Highway 41 Spur
- Location: Pearl River
- Length: 2.586 mi (4.162 km)
- Existed: c. 1969–2007

Louisiana Highway 41 Spur (LA 41 Spur) ran 2.59 miles (4.17 km) in a general east–west direction through the St. Tammany Parish town of Pearl River from LA 41 to an interchange with I-59/US 11. It followed the original route of LA 41 through town before its re-alignment onto Watts Road around 1969.

From the west, LA 41 Spur began at an intersection with its parent route at the northern tip of Pearl River. After traveling southeast for 1.4 miles (2.3 km), the highway turned east onto Pine Street near the town hall and proceeded a short distance to a junction with LA 3081. LA 41 Spur then crossed the Norfolk Southern Railway (NS) tracks at grade to reach ramps serving southbound I-59/US 11 at Exit 5A. LA 41 Spur proceeded to make a nearly one-mile-long (1.6 km) loop underneath the I-59/US 11 bridge across the West Pearl River to access the northbound ramps.

LA 41 Spur was an undivided two-lane highway for its entire length. The posted speed limit ranged from 25 mph (40 km/h) to 45 mph (70 km/h).

Prior to 1955, the route was part of State Route 58. It became part of LA 41 with the 1955 Louisiana Highway renumbering and remained so until around 1969. At this time, a slight western bypass of Pearl River was opened as an improvement of an existing local road known then as the old Military Road. The bypass became the mainline route of LA 41, and the original route was retained in the state highway system as a spur route. In 2007, the majority of LA 41 Spur was returned to local control, but it is still signed locally as "Spur 41" (without a state highway shield). The connection to I-59/US 11 remains in the state highway system as part of LA 3081.

The entire highway was in Pearl River, St. Tammany Parish.

mi	km	Destinations	Notes
0.000	0.000	LA 41 – Slidell, Bogalusa	Western terminus
1.646	2.649	LA 3081 (Old Highway 11) – Slidell, Bogalusa	
2.586	4.162	I-59 / US 11 – New Orleans, Hattiesburg	Eastern terminus; exit 5A on I-59/US 11
1.000 mi = 1.609 km; 1.000 km = 0.621 mi
