= Louisiana Highway 59 =

State highway in Louisiana, United States

Louisiana Highway 59

Route information
- Maintained by Louisiana DOTD
- Length: 11.74 mi (18.89 km)
- Existed: 1955 renumbering–present

Major junctions
- South end: US 190 in Mandeville
- I-12 north of Mandeville; LA 36 in Abita Springs
- North end: LA 21 north of Abita Springs

Location
- Country: United States
- State: Louisiana
- Parishes: St. Tammany

Highway system
- Louisiana State Highway System; Interstate; US; State; Scenic
← I-59	→ LA 60

Louisiana Highway 59 (LA 59) is a state highway located in St. Tammany Parish, Louisiana. It runs 11.74 miles (18.89 km) in a north–south direction from U.S. Highway 190 (US 190) in Mandeville to LA 21 north of Abita Springs.

The highway is the most direct connection between the city of Mandeville and the town of Abita Springs. It also connects both places with Interstate 12 (I-12) roughly halfway between the two. North of Abita Springs, LA 59 intersects LA 21, connecting to Bogalusa and points along the Louisiana–Mississippi state line.

== Route description ==
From the south, LA 59 begins at an intersection with US 190 (Florida Street) along the northern edge of the city of Mandeville. US 190 is the main highway through town and connects to the Lake Pontchartrain Causeway, a toll bridge to New Orleans. LA 59 proceeds northeast on Girod Street as an undivided two-lane highway with a center turning lane. Though technically outside the Mandeville city limits, the area continues the city's grid pattern and residential development ensconced within a pine forest. This trend continues for 0.8 miles (1.3 km) to an intersection with LA 1088, a lateral highway connecting Mandeville with I-12 on the east side of town.

LA 59 continues northeast through an area of mixed rural and newer residential development and turns due north 1.8 miles (2.9 km) later. After passing the entrances to several sprawling school campuses, LA 59 goes through a diamond interchange with I-12, which connects to Hammond on the west and Slidell on the east. North of I-12, the surroundings change from residential to an area featuring several small industrial parks as well as the St. Tammany Parish Administrative Complex. After 1.3 miles (2.1 km), LA 59 makes a curve while crossing the Tammany Trace bike trail, located along a former railroad right-of-way. The highway resumes its regular course and, 1.8 miles (2.9 km) later, enters the small town of Abita Springs at an intersection with Harrison Avenue, a local road.

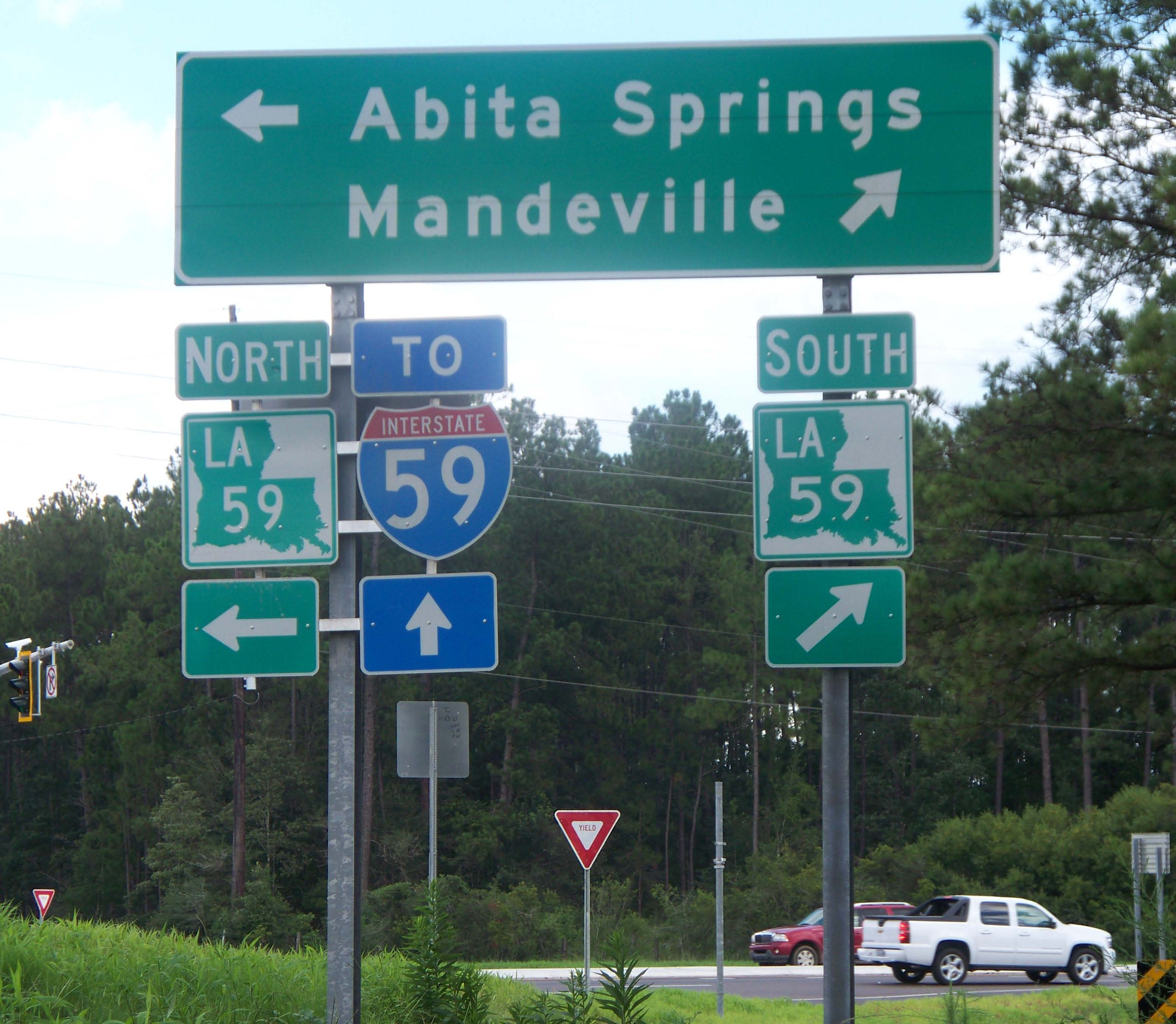
Signage on the eastbound I-12 ramp to LA 59 directs travelers confusing the route with I-59, located about 20 miles (32 km) farther east, to get back onto I-12 eastbound.

LA 59 continues north, narrowing slightly as its center lane is discontinued. The surroundings become largely residential once again, though often still hidden within the dense pine trees. 3.0 miles (4.8 km) into Abita Springs, LA 59 makes a sharp curve to the east into the center of town, where it becomes known as Level Street. Shortly afterward, the highway reaches the town's main junction, a roundabout at which LA 59 intersects and begins a concurrency with LA 36. At this roundabout, eastbound LA 36 heads toward Hickory and Pearl River; Level Street continues east as a local road; and LA 36 turns north with LA 59 onto Maple Street. One block later is an intersection with LA 435 (Main Street), which heads northeast toward Talisheek.

Upon exiting the populated portion of Abita Springs, LA 36 and LA 59 curve to the northwest and cross a small bridge over the Abita River. The two highways split shortly afterward as LA 36 continues west toward Covington while LA 59 turns north onto Range Line Road. LA 59 officially crosses the town limits after 0.7 miles (1.1 km) and continues north through a thick pine forest with scattered residential development. After 2.4 miles (3.9 km), the route ends at an intersection with LA 21 (Military Road). LA 21 heads southwest into Covington and northeast through Bush en route to Bogalusa.

=== Route classification and data ===
LA 59 is classified by the Louisiana Department of Transportation and Development (La DOTD) as an urban minor arterial from the southern terminus to the second junction with LA 36 in Abita Springs. It then becomes an urban collector from there to Lowe Davis Road, where it changes to a rural minor collector for the remainder of its route. Average daily traffic volume in 2013 is reported as 17,600 vehicles between Mandeville and Abita Springs, slightly decreasing to 16,000 within Abita Springs. The section north of Abita Springs has a much lower count of 5,300 vehicles. The posted speed limit is 35 mph (55 km/h) in Mandeville, increasing to 45 mph (70 km/h) between Mandeville and Abita Springs. It then decreases to 25 mph (40 km/h) in Abita Springs before becoming 55 mph (90 km/h) through the rural section north to LA 21.

== History ==
In the original Louisiana Highway system in use between 1921 and 1955, the modern LA 59 was part of two separate state highways. State Route 114 followed the route from the southern terminus to Abita Springs, where it turned east and continued along the present LA 36 toward Hickory. The remainder of LA 59 north of Abita Springs was formerly State Route 190. Both routes were designated by an act of the state legislature in 1928 and existed until the 1955 Louisiana Highway renumbering.

LA 59 was created in the 1955 renumbering following the north–south portion of former State Route 114 combined with the entirety of former State Route 190.

La 59—From a junction with La-US 190 at or near Mandeville through or near Abita Springs to a junction with La 21 near Waldheim.

— 1955 legislative route description

The route of LA 59 has remained the same to the present day. In August 2007, the main junction in Abita Springs, previously governed by a traffic signal, was converted to a roundabout by the state highway department. The roundabout, only the second to be constructed on a state highway in Louisiana, was designed to reduce traffic congestion at the busy intersection and improve the flow of truck traffic.

== Future ==
La DOTD is currently engaged in a program that aims to transfer about 5,000 miles (8,000 km) of state-owned roadways to local governments over the next several years. Under this plan of "right-sizing" the state highway system, the entire route of LA 59 (with the exception of the short concurrency with LA 36) is proposed for deletion as it no longer meets a significant interurban travel function.

== Major intersections ==
The entire highway is in St. Tammany Parish.

Location	mi	km	Destinations	Notes
Mandeville	0.0	0.0	US 190 (Florida Street) – Causeway Toll Bridge, Slidell	Southern terminus
	0.8	1.3	LA 1088 east	Western terminus of LA 1088
	3.6– 3.8	5.8– 6.1	I-12 to I-59 – Hammond, Slidell	Exit 65 on I-12
Abita Springs	8.4	13.5	LA 36 east – Hickory	South end of LA 36 concurrency
Abita Springs	8.5	13.7	LA 435 east (Main Street) – Talisheek	Western terminus of LA 435
Abita Springs	8.8	14.2	LA 36 west – Covington	North end of LA 36 concurrency
	11.8	19.0	LA 21 (Military Road) – Covington, Bogalusa	Northern terminus
1.000 mi = 1.609 km; 1.000 km = 0.621 mi: Concurrency terminus
