= Florenville, Louisiana =

- Unincorporated community
- Location within Louisiana Location within the United States
- Coordinates: 30°25′00″N 89°49′54″W
- Country: United States
- State: Louisiana
- Parish: St. Tammany
- Elevation: 43 ft (13 m)
- Time zone: UTC-6 (Central (CST))
  - Summer (DST): UTC-5 (CDT)
- ZIP code: 70452
- Area code: 985
- GNIS feature ID: 560767
- FIPS code: 22-74585

Florenville is an unincorporated community in St. Tammany Parish, Louisiana, United States. The community is located three miles west of Hickory on Louisiana Highway 36 and 9 mi (14 km) north of Slidell. It is on the Illinois Central Gulf railroad line.
