= Alton, Louisiana =

Unincorporated community in Louisiana

- Unincorporated community
- Location within Louisiana Location within the United States
- Coordinates: 30°19′51″N 89°45′43″W
- Country: United States
- State: Louisiana
- Parish: St. Tammany
- Elevation: 26 ft (7.9 m)
- Time zone: UTC-6 (Central (CST))
  - Summer (DST): UTC-5 (CDT)
- ZIP code: 70452
- Area code: 985
- GNIS feature ID: 559769
- FIPS code: 22-01675

Alton is an unincorporated community in St. Tammany Parish, Louisiana, United States. The community is located 3 mi (4.8 km) north of Slidell on U.S. Route 11, 1.25 miles (2.01 km) north of I-12.
