= Hickory, St. Tammany Parish, Louisiana =

Hickory, Louisiana
- Unincorporated community
- Location within Louisiana Location within the United States
- Coordinates: 30°24′59″N 89°47′06″W
- Country: United States
- State: Louisiana
- Parish: St. Tammany
- Elevation: 23 ft (7.0 m)
- Time zone: UTC-6 (Central (CST))
  - Summer (DST): UTC-5 (CDT)
- ZIP code: 70452
- Area code: 985
- GNIS feature ID: 560961
- FIPS code: 22-34190

Hickory is an unincorporated community in St. Tammany Parish, Louisiana, United States. The community is located 8 mi (13 km) north of Slidell at the intersection of Louisiana Highway 36 and Louisiana Highway 41.
