= Interstate 12 =

Interstate Highway in Louisiana

Interstate 12
- Republic of West Florida Parkway
- I-12 highlighted in red

Route information
- Maintained by Louisiana DOTD
- Length: 85.59 mi (137.74 km)
- Existed: 1967–present
- NHS: Entire route

Major junctions
- West end: I-10 in Baton Rouge
- US 61 in Baton Rouge; I-55 in Hammond; US 190 between Covington and Mandeville; US 11 in Slidell
- East end: I-10 / I-59 in Slidell

Location
- Country: United States
- State: Louisiana
- Parishes: East Baton Rouge, Livingston, Tangipahoa, St. Tammany

Highway system
- Interstate Highway System; Main; Auxiliary; Suffixed; Business; Future; Louisiana State Highway System; Interstate; US; State; Scenic
← US 11	→ LA 12

Interstate 12 (I-12) is an intrastate Interstate Highway located entirely within the US state of Louisiana. It spans a total of 85.59 miles (137.74 km) in an east–west direction from I-10 in Baton Rouge to an interchange with both I-10 and I-59 in Slidell. Along the way, it passes through the city of Hammond, where it intersects I-55 and US Route 51 (US 51). It also serves the cities of Ponchatoula and Denham Springs, as well as the St. Tammany Parish cities of Covington and Mandeville.

I-12 parallels the older US 190 corridor and traverses the north shore of Lake Pontchartrain in the southeastern portion of the state. The Interstate's length is short for a mainline Interstate and is comparable with the country's longest auxiliary Interstates. It is one of the shortest mainline Interstates to terminate at the same route (I-10) at either end. Apart from serving the various communities of the North Shore, I-12 acts as a long bypass of New Orleans and is heavily used as a shortcut for through traffic on I-10. While I-10 curves to the south to pass through the city limits, I-12 takes a more direct alignment, reducing the distance between Baton Rouge and Slidell by about 22 miles (35 km).

In 1993, the Louisiana State Legislature designated I-12 as the Republic of West Florida Parkway. In 2003, signs identifying the highway's official name and bearing the flag of the Republic of West Florida were erected by the Louisiana Department of Transportation and Development (DOTD) in order to highlight the unique history of Louisiana's Florida Parishes.

Louisiana is in the process of widening I-12 to three lanes in each direction in locations such as Covington and Mandeville where the Interstate is still two lanes in each direction.

== Route description ==
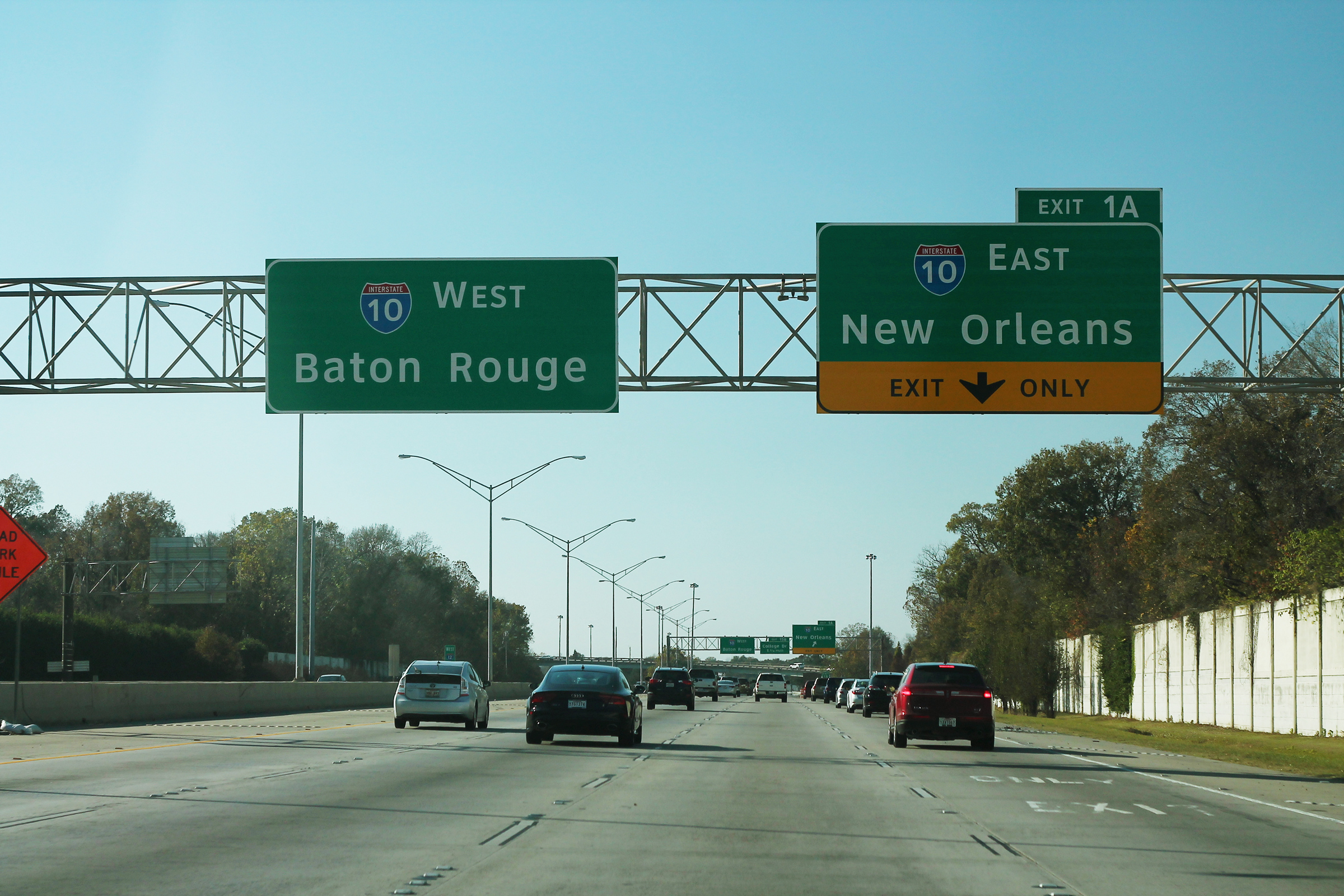
Western terminus in Baton Rouge

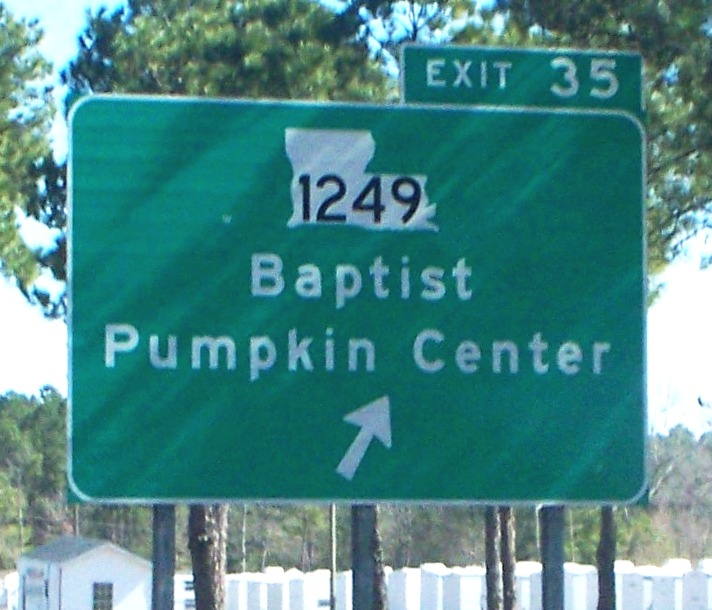
I-12's eastbound exit to LA 1249, which leads to the communities of Baptist and Pumpkin Center

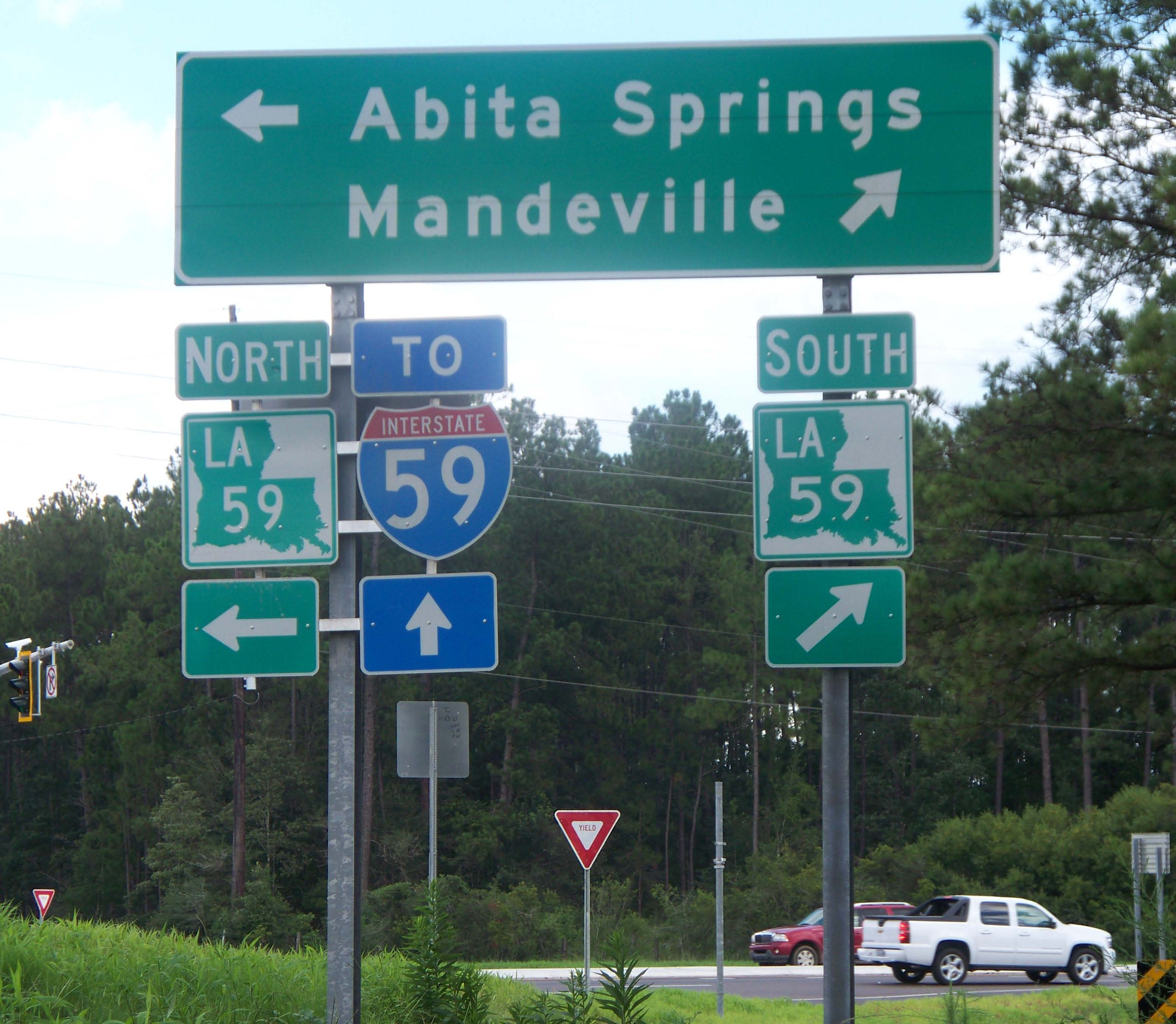
At the bottom of I-12's eastbound ramp to LA 59, travelers also find a shield for the unrelated I-59, some 20 miles (32 km) farther east

=== Baton Rouge to Hammond ===
From the west, I-12 begins three miles (4.8 km) east of downtown Baton Rouge in East Baton Rouge Parish at an interchange with I-10 known as the I-10/I-12 split. While I-10 heads to the southeast toward the New Orleans metropolitan area, I-12 proceeds eastward toward the North Shore of Lake Pontchartrain. Before leaving Baton Rouge, I-12 intersects some of its major arteries, including Louisiana Highway 3064 (LA 3064; Essen Lane) and LA 73 (Jefferson Highway) via LA 1068 (Drusilla Lane). It then passes through a cloverleaf interchange with US 61 (Airline Highway). These three exits serve several of the area's key medical and shopping centers, such as the Our Lady of the Lake Regional Medical Center and Cortana Mall. The final exit in Baton Rouge is an interchange with O'Neal Lane (former LA 3245), which serves the Ochsner Medical Center-Baton Rouge and eastern suburbs.

I-12 reaches the Amite River 1.3 miles (2.1 km) later, where it enters Livingston Parish and the city of Denham Springs. I-12 skirts the southern edge of town, providing interchanges with LA 3002 (South Range Avenue) and LA 1026 (Juban Road). East of Denham springs, I-12 skirts the southern edge of Livingston Parish's only other city, Walker. The interstate's sole exit in Walker is exit 15, an interchange with LA 447.

Past Walker are smaller communities in the eastern half of the parish. Exits include: LA 63 serving Livingston (exit 22), LA 441 serving Holden (exit 29), and LA 43 serving Albany and Springfield (exit 32).

Shortly after crossing the Natalbany River into Tangipahoa Parish, I-12 intersects LA 1249, which leads to the communities of Baptist and Pumpkin Center. I-12 enters into a cloverleaf interchange 3.2 miles (5.1 km) later with I-55 at the southeast corner of Hammond, the largest city in Tangipahoa Parish. I-55 heads toward Jackson, Mississippi, on the north and New Orleans on the south. A mile (1.6 km) after, US 51 crosses I-12, but the two roads do not have an interchange. There is instead an interchange with US 51 Business, which serves downtown Hammond, as well as the city of Ponchatoula to the south.

=== Hammond to Slidell ===
East of Hammond are two rural exits in southeastern Tangipahoa Parish: LA 3158 (Airport Road) to Hammond Northshore Regional Airport and LA 445 to Robert.

Just after crossing into St. Tammany Parish, I-12 curves to the southeast and begins to parallel the North Shore of Lake Pontchartrain. An interchange with LA 1077 serves the town of Madisonville to the south. The following exit, an interchange with LA 21, also connects to Madisonville as well as the parish seat of Covington to the north. Immediately before crossing the Tchefuncte River, an exit to Pinnacle Parkway and East Brewster Road serves the growing shopping area east of LA 21.

Two miles (3.2 km) east of the bridge, I-12 passes through an interchange with US 190 between Covington and Mandeville. This section of US 190 serves as St. Tammany Parish's busiest north–south thoroughfare, connecting Covington and surrounding points with the Lake Pontchartrain Causeway, a 24-mile-long (39 km) bridge leading to New Orleans. Further exits in St. Tammany Parish west of Slidell include LA 59 to Mandeville and Abita Springs, LA 1088 to LA 36, and LA 434 to Lacombe.

I-12 passes through an interchange with Airport Drive 6.3 miles (10.1 km) east of the Lacombe exit, which connects to Slidell Airport due north. At this exit, I-12 enters the northern edge of Slidell. An interchange with US 11 connects to the downtown area. Less than two miles (3.2 km) later, I-12 reaches its eastern terminus at a major interchange with I-10 and I-59 at the northeast corner of town. From this interchange, I-10 heads southwest toward New Orleans and east toward Bay St. Louis, Mississippi, while I-59 heads north toward Hattiesburg, Mississippi.

== History ==
I-12 was added to the highway system on October 17, 1957, with I-12 running from I-10 in Baton Rouge to I-59 north of Slidell. By the mid-1960s, the routes had been realigned to their current configuration, with I-12 and I-59 both ending at I-10 near Slidell. The route was opened to traffic in several sections between January 1967 and June 1976.

With major damage to the I-10 Twin Span Bridge across Lake Pontchartrain from Hurricane Katrina, I-12 was temporarily functioning as I-10 between Baton Rouge and Slidell. On October 14, 2005, the eastbound span of I-10 over Lake Pontchartrain reopened to two-way traffic. The westbound span of I-10 reopened on January 6, 2006, with speed, weight and size restrictions, relieving I-12 of much of the congestion that was clogging it from the Lake Pontchartrain Causeway to the junction with I-10 and I-59.

Since 2012, the DOTD has been widening the Interstate from four lanes to six lanes to accommodate the increasing amount of traffic and make the section safer. The I-10/I-12/I-59 split, notorious for rough pavement, was repaved in 2015.

== Exit list ==
Parish	Location	mi	km	Exit	Destinations	Notes
East Baton Rouge	Baton Rouge	0.000– 0.903	0.000– 1.453	1A	I-10 – Baton Rouge, New Orleans	Western terminus; signed as exit 1A to I-10 east only; exit 159 on I-10
East Baton Rouge	Baton Rouge	1.223– 1.649	1.968– 2.654	1B	LA 3064 (Essen Lane)	No westbound exit
East Baton Rouge	Baton Rouge	2.204– 2.275	3.547– 3.661	1C	Drusilla Lane	Eastbound entrance and westbound exit; former LA 1068
East Baton Rouge	Baton Rouge	2.608– 3.206	4.197– 5.160	2	US 61 (Airline Highway)	Signed as exits 2A (south) and 2B (north); to U.S. Route 190 (Florida Boulevard)
East Baton Rouge	Baton Rouge	3.807– 4.447	6.127– 7.157	4	Sherwood Forest Boulevard	
East Baton Rouge	Baton Rouge	5.707– 6.498	9.185– 10.458	6	Millerville Road	
East Baton Rouge	Baton Rouge	6.844– 7.454	11.014– 11.996	7	O'Neal Lane	Former LA 3245
East Baton Rouge–Livingston parish line	Denham Springs	8.410– 8.902	13.535– 14.326	Bridge over Amite River		
Livingston	Denham Springs	10.040– 10.599	16.158– 17.057	10	LA 3002 – Denham Springs	
Livingston		12.442– 13.033	20.023– 20.975	12	LA 1026 (Juban Road)	
Livingston	Walker	15.711– 16.338	25.284– 26.293	15	LA 447 – Walker, Port Vincent	
Livingston		19.604– 20.359	31.550– 32.765	19	PR 45 – Satsuma, Colyell	
Livingston	Livingston	22.602– 23.468	36.374– 37.768	22	LA 63 – Livingston, Frost	
Livingston		28.667– 29.745	46.135– 47.870	29	LA 441 – Holden	
Livingston		32.504– 33.334	52.310– 53.646	32	LA 43 – Albany, Springfield	To Tickfaw State Park
Tangipahoa		34.848– 35.562	56.082– 57.231	35	LA 1249 – Baptist, Pumpkin Center	
Tangipahoa	Hammond	38.015– 38.735	61.179– 62.338	38	I-55 – New Orleans, Jackson	Signed as exits 38A (south) and 38B (north); exit 29 on I-55
Tangipahoa	Hammond	40.016– 40.595	64.400– 65.331	40	US 51 Bus. – Hammond, Ponchatoula	
Tangipahoa		42.378– 43.156	68.201– 69.453	42	LA 3158 north (Airport Road)	Southern terminus of LA 3158; to Chappapeela Sports Park and Hammond Northshore Regional Airport
Tangipahoa		47.418– 48.184	76.312– 77.545	47	LA 445 – Robert	
St. Tammany		56.702– 57.855	91.253– 93.109	57	LA 1077 – Goodbee, Madisonville	To Fairview Riverside State Park
St. Tammany		59.101– 60.138	95.114– 96.783	59	LA 21 – Covington, Madisonville	
St. Tammany		60.220– 60.958	96.915– 98.102	60	Pinnacle Parkway / East Brewster Road	
St. Tammany		60.953– 61.240	98.094– 98.556	Bridge over Tchefuncte River		
St. Tammany		62.580– 63.565	100.713– 102.298	63	US 190 – Covington, Mandeville	Signed as exits 63A (east) and 63B (west); additional destinations are New Orleans via Lake Pontchartrain Causeway and Bogalusa
St. Tammany		65.710– 66.387	105.750– 106.840	65	LA 59 – Abita Springs, Mandeville	
St. Tammany		68.195– 69.101	109.749– 111.207	68	LA 1088 to LA 36 – Mandeville	
St. Tammany	Lacombe	73.995– 74.773	119.083– 120.335	74	LA 434 – Lacombe, St. Tammany	to future LA 3241
St. Tammany	Slidell	80.160– 81.149	129.005– 130.597	80	Airport Drive / North Shore Boulevard	To Slidell Municipal Airport and Camp Villere / Southeast Louisiana Veterans Cemetery
St. Tammany	Slidell	83.620– 84.152	134.573– 135.430	83	US 11 – Slidell, Pearl River	
St. Tammany	Slidell	85.375– 86.653	137.398– 139.454	85	I-10 / I-59 – New Orleans, Biloxi, Hattiesburg	Eastern terminus of I-12; southern terminus of I-59; signed as exits 85A (I-10 west), 85B (I-59) and 85C (I-10 east); exit 267B on I-10; exit 1C on I-59
1.000 mi = 1.609 km; 1.000 km = 0.621 mi: Incomplete access
