= Louisiana Highway 21 =

State highway in Louisiana, United States

Louisiana Highway 21

Route information
- Maintained by Louisiana DOTD
- Length: 52.1 mi (83.8 km)
- Existed: 1955 renumbering–present

Major junctions
- South end: LA 22 / LA 1077 in Madisonville
- I-12 near Covington; US 190 in Covington; LA 36 in Covington; LA 59 near Waldheim; LA 40 near Bush; LA 41 in Bush; LA 16 in Sun; LA 10 in Bogalusa
- North end: MS 35 at Mississippi state line

Location
- Country: United States
- State: Louisiana

Highway system
- Louisiana State Highway System; Interstate; US; State; Scenic
← LA 20	→ LA 22

Louisiana Highway 21 (LA 21) is a state highway in Louisiana that serves St. Tammany and Washington Parishes. It spans 51.76 miles (83.30 km) and is signed north and south.

== Route description ==
From the south, LA 21 begins at an intersection with LA 22 and LA 1077 in Madisonville, where LA 21 assumes the trajectory of LA 1077 and heads northeast. LA 1077 branches to the northwest before LA 21 intersects Interstate 12 (I-12). From south of I-12 and until joining U.S. Route 190 Business (US 190 Bus.) on 21st Avenue in Covington, LA 21 is multilaned, in places divided by a median or by a center turn lane, with some control of access.

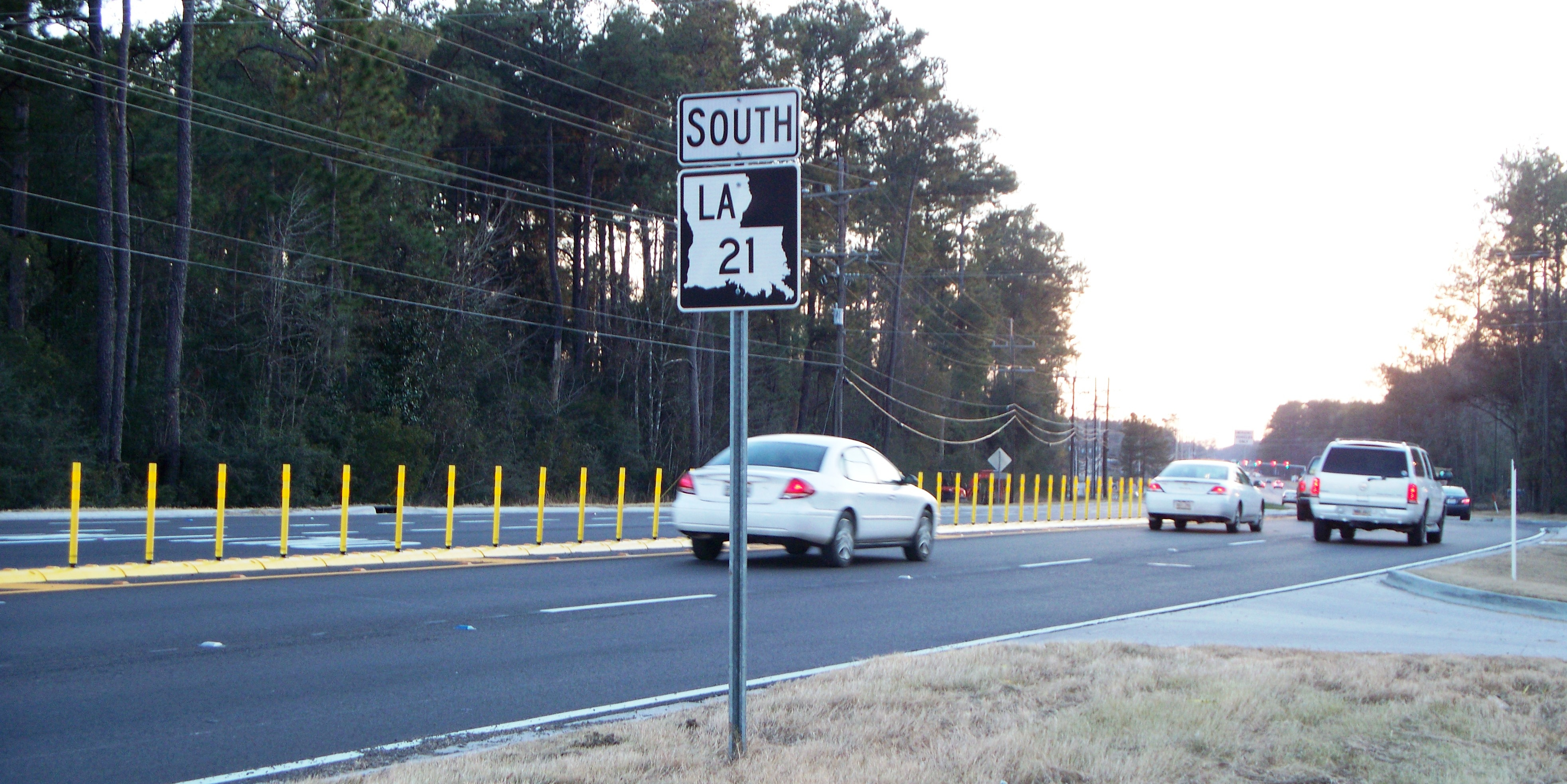
Improved, multilane, divided section of LA 21 between Covington and Madisonville

Through most of Covington, LA 21 is in a mostly two-lane undivided highway concurrent with US 190 Bus., which returns to US 190 on the east side of Covington—an area known as Claiborne Hill. After intersecting US 190 and before leaving Covington cosigned as Military Road, LA 21 absorbs LA 36 and continues northeastward, absorbing LA 59 and entering a brief concurrency with Louisiana Highway 40 in Bush for less than one mile (1.6 km). Between Bush and Sun, LA 21 widens to a four lane, divided highway after merging Louisiana Highway 41, continuing due north from the merge. In Sun LA 21 absorbs LA 16 and continues northward to Bogalusa, where LA 21 intersects LA 10. LA 21 then runs north through Varnado and Angie before becoming Mississippi Highway 35 at the state line.

== Major intersections ==
Parish	Location	mi	km	Destinations	Notes
St. Tammany	Madisonville	0.0	0.0	LA 22 (Mulberry Street) / LA 1077 south (Main Street) – Fairview Riverside State Park, Maritime Museum	South end of LA 1077 overlap
St. Tammany		1.2	1.9	LA 1077 north to I-12	North end of LA 1077 overlap
St. Tammany		3.4– 3.6	5.5– 5.8	I-12 – Hammond, Slidell	I-12 exit 59
St. Tammany	Covington	6.6	10.6	US 190 Bus. west (West 21st Avenue) / North Tyler Street	South end of US 190 Bus. overlap
St. Tammany	Covington	7.8	12.6	US 190 east to I-12 – Mandeville, New Orleans	Interchange; westbound US 190 entrance only
St. Tammany	Covington	7.9– 8.0	12.7– 12.9	US 190 Bus. east to US 190 – Franklinton	North end of US 190 Bus. overlap
St. Tammany		8.0– 8.1	12.9– 13.0	LA 36 east (Covington Highway) – Abita Springs	Western terminus of LA 36
St. Tammany		11.9	19.2	LA 1082 north (Old Military Road)	Southern terminus of LA 1082
St. Tammany		12.3	19.8	LA 59 south (Range Line Road) – Abita Springs	Northern terminus of LA 59
St. Tammany		13.1	21.1	LA 1084 east	Western terminus of LA 1084
St. Tammany	Waldheim	15.2	24.5	LA 1083 south	South end of LA 1083 overlap
St. Tammany	Waldheim	15.4	24.8	LA 1083 north (Ben Williams Road)	North end of LA 1083 overlap
St. Tammany		21.9	35.2	LA 40 west / Daisy Road	South end of LA 40 overlap
St. Tammany		22.4	36.0	LA 40 east / Columbia Road	North end of LA 40 overlap
St. Tammany		23.3	37.5	LA 41 south – Slidell	Northern terminus of LA 41
St. Tammany	Sun	25.5	41.0	LA 16 west	Eastern terminus of LA 16
Washington		27.4	44.1	LA 1075 north	Southern terminus of LA 1075
Washington	Bogalusa	36.3	58.4	LA 10 (Louisiana Avenue)	
Washington		38.8	62.4	LA 436 east	Terminus of LA 1082
Washington		42.9	69.0	LA 436 – Pine, Franklinton	
Washington	Varnado	44.0	70.8	LA 436-1 east (Main Street) / Seal Cemetery Road – Varnado High School	Western terminus of LA 436-1
Washington	Angie	48.9	78.7	LA 1071 east	Western terminus of LA 1071
Washington	Angie	49.4	79.5	LA 438 west (Elm Street)	Eastern terminus of LA 438
Washington		52.1	83.8	MS 35 north – Columbia	Mississippi state line
1.000 mi = 1.609 km; 1.000 km = 0.621 mi: Concurrency terminus; Incomplete access
