= Louisiana Highway 1077 =

State highway in Louisiana, United States

Louisiana Highway 1077

- Route of LA 1077 highlighted in red

Route information
- Maintained by Louisiana DOTD
- Length: 20.612 mi (33.172 km)
- Existed: 1955 renumbering–present

Major junctions
- South end: Dead end at Lake Pontchartrain in Madisonville
- LA 22 in Madisonville; LA 21 north of Madisonville; I-12 north of Madisonville; US 190 at Goodbee
- North end: LA 25 south of Folsom

Location
- Country: United States
- State: Louisiana
- Parishes: St. Tammany

Highway system
- Louisiana State Highway System; Interstate; US; State; Scenic
← LA 1076	→ LA 1078
← SR 187	SR 188	→ SR 189

Louisiana Highway 1077 (LA 1077) is a state highway located in southeastern Louisiana. It runs 20.61 miles (33.17 km) in a general north–south direction from a dead end at Lake Pontchartrain in Madisonville to a junction with LA 25 south of Folsom.

The route traverses the length of Madisonville, a small town in St. Tammany Parish, where it travels along the Tchefuncte River and is partially concurrent with LA 21. Both routes connect Madisonville to Interstate 12 (I-12), the region's major east–west highway. North of town, LA 1077 crosses US 190 at Goodbee, a point west of Covington. Near the end of its route, LA 1077 abandons its north–south trajectory at the Tangipahoa Parish line and turns east to connect with LA 25. Despite this, the signage for LA 1077 retains north–south directional banners throughout.

LA 1077 was designated in the 1955 Louisiana Highway renumbering, primarily replacing the former State Route 188. In the future, the entire route is proposed for deletion as part of the Louisiana Department of Transportation and Development's ongoing Road Transfer Program.

== Route description ==
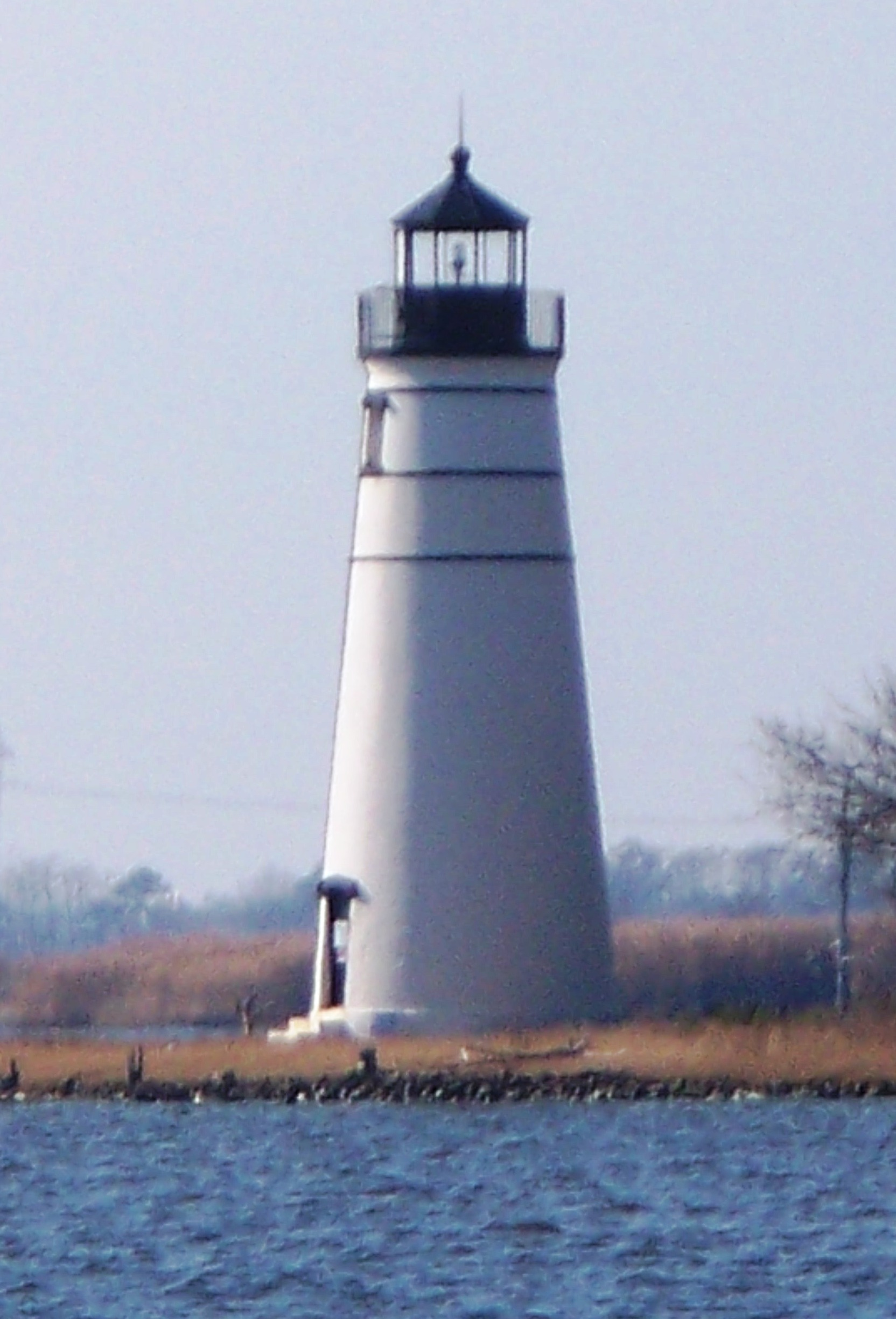
The southern terminus of LA 1077 at Lake Pontchartrain is located just east of the Tchefuncte River Lighthouse, a local landmark originally constructed in 1837.

From the south, LA 1077 begins at the southern tip of Madisonville where the Tchefuncte River flows into Lake Pontchartrain. The route heads north on Main Street, closely following the west bank of the river. Within its first mile, LA 1077 crosses a one-lane bridge spanning a small canal, followed by a narrow two-lane bridge over a bayou. On its way into town, the highway passes the Lake Pontchartrain Basin Maritime Museum, as well as the local library and town hall. LA 1077 crosses LA 22 (Mulberry Street) one block west of a swing bridge spanning the Tchefuncte River. This junction also marks the southern terminus of LA 21, which begins a concurrency with LA 1077. The combined route zigzags through the center of Madisonville, turning west from Main Street onto St. John Street then northwest onto Covington Street.

While crossing over Bayou De Zaire, LA 21 and LA 1077 exit the corporate limits. A short distance later, LA 21 branches to the northeast toward the city of Covington, taking the main flow of traffic with it. LA 1077 proceeds northward, and over the next three miles (4.8 km), the highway passes Madisonville Elementary School, crosses Brewster Road, and reaches a diamond interchange with I-12 at exit 57. I-12 connects with Hammond to the west and Slidell to the east. Shortly afterward, LA 1077 passes through a roundabout intersection with LA 1085 at Archbishop Hannan High School. The surroundings become sparsely populated north of I-12, as fewer residential subdivisions are visible within the thick pine forest. At a point known as Goodbee, LA 1077 crosses US 190, which parallels I-12 throughout the North Shore region.

5.6 miles (9.0 km) later, LA 1077 turns northeast at a T-intersection and begins a concurrency with LA 1078. The roadway, locally known as Turnpike Road, also continues straight ahead signed as LA 1077 for less than 0.3 miles (0.48 km) until state maintenance ends at the St. Tammany–Tangipahoa parish line. After crossing the Tchefuncte River and traveling concurrent with LA 1078 for one mile (1.6 km), LA 1077 turns northeast at a T-intersection then east at another T-intersection with North Willie Road. The route continues eastward until reaching a junction with LA 25 between Folsom and Covington.

=== Route classification and data ===
LA 1077 is an undivided two-lane highway for its entire length. It has several different classifications over the course of its route, as determined by the Louisiana Department of Transportation and Development (La DOTD). It ranges from a rural local road at either end to an urban minor arterial over the LA 21 concurrency in Madisonville. Most of the route is classified as either a major or minor collector. Daily traffic volume in 2013 peaked at 14,200 vehicles while paired with LA 21 in Madisonville. The lowest count reported was 1,050 vehicles near the northern terminus at LA 25. The posted speed limit is 55 mph (90 km/h) for most of the route but is reduced as low as 25 mph (40 km/h) through Madisonville.

== History ==
State Route 188
- Location: St. Tammany Parish
- Length: 15.1 mi (24.3 km)
- Existed: 1928–1955

In the original Louisiana Highway system in use between 1921 and 1955, LA 1077 was primarily designated as State Route 188. This includes the entire north–south portion between Lake Pontchartrain and the St. Tammany–Tangipahoa parish line. Route 188 was added to the state highway system by an act of the state legislature in 1928.

Route 188. Beginning at the Light House on Lake Pontchartrain thence through Madisonville, and thence northwest to Tangipahoa Parish line.

— 1928 legislative route description

The east–west portion connecting with LA 25 was taken into the system during the 1940s. By this time, the Louisiana Highway Commission (predecessor of the modern Department of Transportation and Development) had gained the authority to designate routes at its own discretion. These newer routes contained a "C-" prefix. The east–west portion of LA 1077 was split among two routes in the pre-1955 system: State Route C-1723 for the first 1.1 miles (1.8 km) and State Route C-1724 for the remaining 4.3 miles (6.9 km) east of what is now LA 1078. These highways were joined together under the single designation of LA 1077 when the Louisiana Department of Highways renumbered the state highway system in 1955.

La 1077—From a point at or near Lake Pontchartrain to a junction with La-US 190 at or near Madisonville and from a junction with La 21 north of Madisonville through or near Goodbee to a junction with La 25 approximately 4 miles south of Folsom.

— 1955 legislative route description

Except for the portion running through the center of Madisonville, LA 1077 was a gravel highway at the time of the 1955 renumbering. Most of the route was paved during the late 1950s. However, the portion south of Madisonville remained a gravel road until the late 1970s. The paved route did not deviate from the established gravel alignment, and there have been no further changes to the route. A major improvement along LA 1077 occurred in 1976 when the interchange with I-12 was completed. On June 25 of that year, it was part of the last stretch of I-12 opened to traffic, spanning 31.2 miles (50.2 km) from LA 445 south of Robert to LA 434 north of Lacombe.

The route of LA 1077 contains an anomaly within the state highway system. The T-intersection near the St. Tammany–Tangipahoa parish line is signed as LA 1077 in all three directions. This type of occurrence usually led to one branch of the route being designated as a "Spur" in the years following the 1955 renumbering (though the actual route signage sometimes does not carry the Spur banner). However, this practice was not used for LA 1077.

== Future ==
La DOTD is currently engaged in a program that aims to transfer about 5,000 miles (8,000 km) of state-owned roadways to local governments over the next several years. Under this plan of "right-sizing" the state highway system, the entirety of LA 1077 is proposed for deletion as it no longer meets a significant interurban travel function.

== Major intersections ==
Parish	Location	mi	km	Destinations	Notes
St. Tammany	Madisonville	0.000	0.000	Dead end at Lake Pontchartrain	Southern terminus
St. Tammany	Madisonville	1.967	3.166	LA 21 begins LA 22 (Mulberry Street)	Southern terminus of LA 21; south end of LA 21 concurrency; to Fairview Riverside State Park
St. Tammany		3.007– 3.067	4.839– 4.936	LA 21 north to I-12 – Covington	North end of LA 21 concurrency
St. Tammany		5.706– 6.212	9.183– 9.997	I-12 – Hammond, Slidell	Exit 57 on I-12
St. Tammany		6.663	10.723	LA 1085 south	Roundabout; northern terminus of LA 1085
St. Tammany	Goodbee	9.298	14.964	US 190 – Covington, Hammond	
St. Tammany		14.921	24.013	LA 1077 north / LA 1078 east	Western terminus of LA 1078
St. Tammany–Tangipahoa parish line		15.184	24.436	Turnpike Road	End state maintenance
Gap in LA 1077; route resumes from previous junction
St. Tammany		15.184	24.436	LA 1077 (Turnpike Road) LA 1078 begins	Western terminus of LA 1078; south end of LA 1078 concurrency
St. Tammany		16.304	26.239	LA 1078 east	North end of LA 1078 concurrency
St. Tammany		20.612	33.172	LA 25 – Folsom, Covington	Northern terminus
1.000 mi = 1.609 km; 1.000 km = 0.621 mi: Concurrency terminus
