= Houltonville, Louisiana =

Place in St. Tammany Parish, Louisiana

Coordinates: 30°24′25″N 90°08′32″W

Houltonville is a populated place in St. Tammany Parish, Louisiana, at latitude 30.407 and longitude -90.142. The elevation is 3 feet. Houltonville appears on the Madisonville U.S. Geological Survey Map. St. Tammany Parish is in the Central Time Zone (UTC -6 hours).
