= Waldheim, Louisiana =

- Unincorporated community
- Location within Louisiana Location within the United States
- Coordinates: 30°33′23″N 90°00′43″W
- Country: United States
- State: Louisiana
- Parish: St. Tammany
- Elevation: 7 ft (2.1 m)
- Time zone: UTC-6 (Central (CST))
  - Summer (DST): UTC-5 (CDT)
- ZIP code: 70435
- Area code: 985
- GNIS feature ID: 1628434
- FIPS code: 22-79205

Waldheim is an unincorporated community in St. Tammany Parish, Louisiana, United States. The community is located 7 mi (11 km) northeast of Covington on Louisiana Highway 21.

== Etymology ==
The area around Waldheim was originally called St. Boniface by a local Reverend J. Ahrens and was named after Saint Boniface. Then on December 5, 1907, the community was renamed Waldheim meaning 'forest home' in the German language.
