= Maude, Louisiana =

- Unincorporated community
- Location within Louisiana Location within the United States
- Coordinates: 30°22′23″N 89°48′45″W
- Country: United States
- State: Louisiana
- Parish: St. Tammany
- Elevation: 33 ft (10 m)
- Time zone: UTC-6 (Central (CST))
  - Summer (DST): UTC-5 (CDT)
- ZIP code: 70452
- Area code: 985
- GNIS feature ID: 1627625
- FIPS code: 22-49195

Maude is an unincorporated community in St. Tammany Parish, Louisiana, United States. The community is located 6 mi (9.7 km) north of Slidell and 3.5 mi (5.6 km) west of Pearl River. It is on the Illinois Central Gulf railroad line.
