= U.S. Route 190 Business (Covington, Louisiana) =

Business route in Louisiana, United States

U.S. Highway 190 Business

Route information
- Maintained by Louisiana DOTD
- Length: 3.31 mi (5.33 km)
- Existed: 1969–present

Major junctions
- West end: US 190 in Covington
- East end: US 190 in Covington

Location
- Country: United States
- State: Louisiana
- Parishes: St. Tammany

Highway system
- United States Numbered Highway System; List; Special; Divided; Louisiana State Highway System; Interstate; US; State; Scenic
← US 190	→ LA 191

U.S. Highway 190 Business (internally known as U.S. Highway 190-X) is a 3.31 mile (5.88 km) business route of US 190 in Covington, Louisiana. It is known locally as 21st Avenue and Boston Street. The route is primarily used to access southbound Louisiana Highway 21 (LA 21) and Covington's business district. It also is Covington's road grid divider between north and south for a part of its length.

== Route description ==
From the west, US 190 Business begins at an intersection with US 190 to the west of Covington. It continues through Covington's downtown business district as 21st Avenue, where it intersects LA 21 (South Tyler Street). LA 21 turns onto 21st Avenue and begins its concurrency with US 190 Business. Crossing Theard Street, the road becomes known as Boston Street. US 190 Business continues until it reaches US 190, where a southbound exit ramp to US 190 is present. At the same intersection is where LA 21 continues eastward, while US 190 makes a right turn onto a small road that parallels US 190. Continuing south (but signed as east), US 190 Business intersects US 190 about a quarter of a mile later. At the eastern terminus of US 190 Business, signs guide drivers to I-12 and the cities of Mandeville and New Orleans via southbound US 190.

Business US 190 is an undivided, two-lane highway for its entire length.

== History ==
The creation of US 190 Business stems from the building of the bypass around Covington. The first half of the bypass, which ran north to south, was constructed in the mid-to-late 1950's to move Louisiana Highway 25 out of downtown Covington. This part of the Covington bypass was opened to traffic in 1958. The second half of the bypass, which runs west to east, was opened in 1969. The Louisiana Department of Highways petitioned the American Association of State Highway Officials (AASHO) to move US 190 to the new bypass while making the former alignment a business route. Both requests were approved at the AASHO meeting in June 1969 and the Louisiana Department of Highways began signposting the routes as such the same year. The LA 25 designation was truncated to its intersection at the north end of the new bypass at this time as well.

== Junction list ==
The entire highway is in Covington, St. Tammany Parish.

mi	km	Destinations	Notes
0.00	0.00	US 190	
1.71	2.75	LA 21 south (S. Tyler Street) to I-12	West end of LA 21 overlap
3.00	4.83	US 190 south / LA 21 north	East end of LA 21 overlap; southbound exit to US 190
3.31	5.33	US 190 to I-12 – Mandeville, New Orleans	
1.000 mi = 1.609 km; 1.000 km = 0.621 mi: Concurrency terminus
