= Louisiana Highway 36 =

State highway in Louisiana, United States

Louisiana Highway 36

Route information
- Maintained by Louisiana DOTD
- Length: 19.0 mi (30.6 km)
- Existed: 1955 renumbering–present

Major junctions
- West end: LA 21 in Covington
- LA 59 in Abita Springs; LA 434 in St. Tammany Corner
- East end: LA 41 in Hickory

Location
- Country: United States
- State: Louisiana
- Parishes: St. Tammany

Highway system
- Louisiana State Highway System; Interstate; US; State; Scenic
← LA 35	→ LA 37

Louisiana Highway 36 (LA 36) is a state highway in Louisiana that serves St. Tammany Parish. It spans 19.0 miles (30.6 km) and is bannered east/west.

== Route description ==
From the west, LA 36 begins at an intersection with LA 21 in Covington and heads east. It enters a brief overlap with LA 59 in Abita Springs for approximately a quarter of a mile. It absorbs LA 435 and then heads east, terminating at LA 41 in Hickory.

In 2008 the stop signs for the intersections in Abita Springs' center were eliminated as all the intersections were amalgamated into a roundabout, ensuring a smoother flow of traffic as left turns ceased to exist. LA 36 is an undivided two-lane highway for its entire length.

== History ==
The original 1955 route of LA 36 originally went as far west as Hammond, using what is now Business US 190 through Covington, then what is now US 190 between Business 190 and US 51 west to Hammond. It was truncated to LA 21 when US 190 was moved to its current routing between US 51 and Business 190, and when what is now Business 190 became US 190.

== Major junctions ==
The entire route is in St. Tammany Parish.

Location	mi	km	Destinations	Notes
Covington	0.0	0.0	LA 21 (Military Road)	
Abita Springs	2.6	4.2	LA 59 (Range Line Road)	West end of LA 59 overlap
Abita Springs	2.9	4.7	LA 435 east (Main Street)	Western terminus of LA 435
Abita Springs	3.0	4.8	LA 59 (Level Street)	Roundabout, east end of LA 59 overlap
	11.1	17.9	LA 1088 west to I-12	Eastern terminus of LA 1088
St. Tammany Corner	12.8	20.6	LA 434 south to I-12	Northern terminus of LA 434
Hickory	19.0	30.6	LA 41 – Bogalusa, Pearl River	
1.000 mi = 1.609 km; 1.000 km = 0.621 mi: Concurrency terminus
