= Pumpkin Center, Louisiana =

Unincorporated community in Louisiana

- Unincorporated community
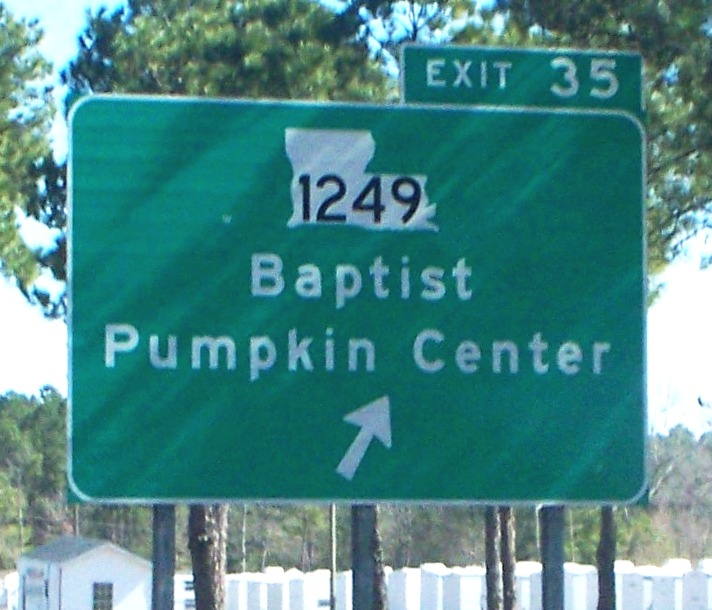

- Location within Louisiana Location within the United States
- Coordinates: 30°27′18″N 90°32′31″W
- Country: United States
- State: Louisiana
- Parish: Tangipahoa
- Elevation: 6.9 ft (2.1 m)
- Time zone: UTC-6 (Central (CST))
  - Summer (DST): UTC-5 (CDT)
- Area code: 985
- GNIS feature ID: 543603
- FIPS code: 22-62945

Pumpkin Center is an unincorporated community in Tangipahoa Parish, Louisiana, United States. Pumpkin Center is located on U.S. Route 190, west of Hammond.

== Name origin ==
The town is said to be named after the fictional home town of Uncle Josh from the work of comedian Cal Stewart, who was widely known for his phonograph records. The village had no name at that time and some of the young men formed a baseball team to compete with the surrounding Hammond, Springfield and Albany teams. The team members named themselves the "Pumpkin Center" baseball team. Over time the residents of the surrounding cities and villages began referring to the area as Pumpkin Center and the name stuck.
