= Interstate 59 in Louisiana =

Interstate Highway in Louisiana, United States

Interstate 59
- I-59 highlighted in red

Route information
- Maintained by Louisiana DOTD
- Length: 11.48 mi (18.48 km)
- Existed: August 14, 1957–present
- History: Completed December 21, 1965
- NHS: Entire route

Major junctions
- South end: I-10 / I-12 in Slidell
- US 11 in Pearl River
- North end: I-59 / US 11 at the Mississippi state line in Nicholson, MS

Location
- Country: United States
- State: Louisiana
- Parishes: St. Tammany

Highway system
- Interstate Highway System; Main; Auxiliary; Suffixed; Business; Future; Louisiana State Highway System; Interstate; US; State; Scenic
← LA 58	→ LA 59

Interstate 59 (I-59) is a part of the Interstate Highway System that runs 445.23 miles (716.53 km) from Slidell, Louisiana, to just outside of Wildwood, Georgia. In the U.S. state of Louisiana, I-59 extends 11.48 miles (18.48 km) from its national southern terminus at I-10 and I-12 in Slidell to the Mississippi state line north of the town of Pearl River. This segment of I-59 is the shortest of the four states which it passes through.

The route is located in the southeastern portion of the state, largely paralleling the older U.S. Route 11 (US 11) corridor for its entire length. All of I-59 in Louisiana is located in St. Tammany Parish. I-59 serves as a major thoroughfare through southeastern Louisiana, providing a fast route for travelers headed to and from New Orleans via I-10 and I-12. The Interstate is also an important hurricane evacuation route for travelers headed away from the warm Gulf Coast.

== Route description ==
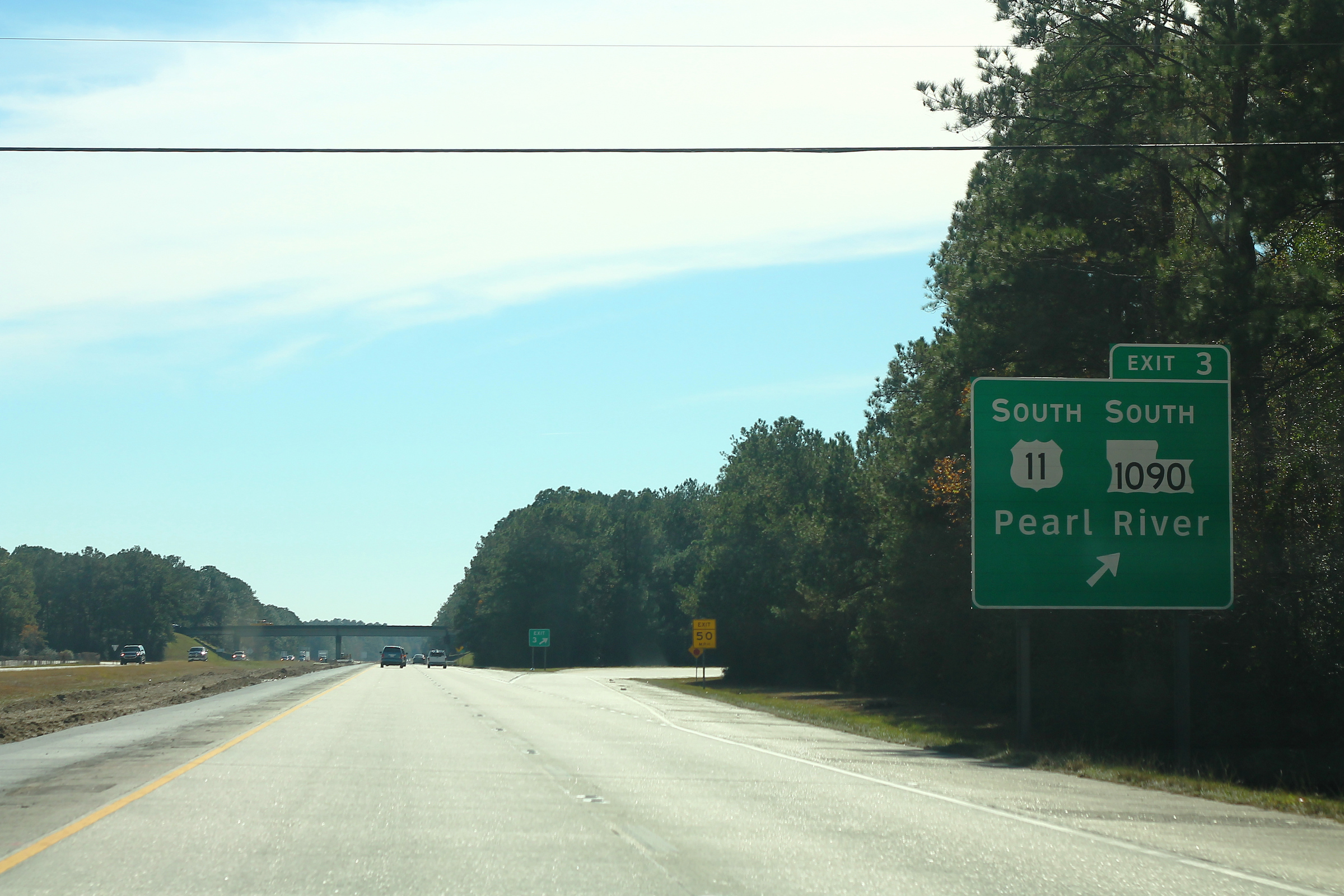
I-59 southbound at the US 11/LA 1090 interchange in Pearl River

I-59 begins at its southern terminus at a partial cloverleaf interchange (parclo) with I-10 (exit 267) and I-12 (exit 85, which also has its eastern terminus) in the northeast portion of the city of Slidell, a suburb of New Orleans, located approximately 20 miles (32 km) east of the city center. Proceeding northward, I-59 crosses through generally wooded areas without much development along the road. About one mile (1.6 km) after the large interchange at its southern terminus, the southbound lanes have a rest area as well as a visitor center for travelers. A brief distance later, I-59 reaches the town of Pearl River and has its first interchange with US 11 as well as LA 1090, a short state highway. US 11 merges with I-59 to form a concurrency as the highway continues north. The highway then enters some development as it intersects with LA 3081 for the town's main district at milepost 5. Immediately following this, I-59/US 11 crosses the west branch of the Pearl River twice in succession before meandering through the marshes of the Honey Island Swamp and reaching another interchange for the former routing of US 11. The surroundings of the road become wooded once again as I-59/US 11 continues through these areas and parallels a service road. The route then comes within close proximity of the water in the swamp before reaching its final interchange in the state for travelers who want to reverse direction and go the opposite direction, or use the service road. Approximately 1/4 mile (0.40 km) later, I-59/US 11 crosses the main branch of the Pearl River to enter Pearl River County, Mississippi.

== History ==
I-59 had a long history before its establishment in Louisiana. In 1958, the state spent $45 million more in comparison to 1957 on road work to help improve the network of highways. $112 million in bids were received by LDOTD to help pay for the roads, of which 15,000 miles (24,000 km) were being maintained. The Pearl River bridges crossing the Louisiana-Mississippi border along the relocation of US 11 and I-59 had an estimated cost of $300,000, with Louisiana paying approximately $15,000, Mississippi paying the same amount, and the remainder by federal aid as part of the Federal-Aid Highway Act of 1956.

In 1959, engineers acquired rights of way to start building I-59, which would serve as more of a replacement for US 11. The rights of way would be from the southwest edge of the Honey Island Swamp to an unknown location at Military Road, a distance of three miles (4.8 km). During this time, the bridges across the Pearl River were under construction due to the difficulty of the highway through the swamp. The proposed routing was planned to enter Louisiana just south of Picayune, follow the path of the Honey Island Swamp, and bypass Slidell to the east, while coming to Lake Pontchartrain. On August 21, 1960, highway contracts up to $5 million allowed work to get underway. The contract was awarded on a low bid of $3,426,431. Highway Director Ray Burgess announced that the largest project was on I-59, with construction still going on at the West Pearl River bridge and approaches along I-59 within the parish. The work also included grading, drainage structuring, an overpass, twin bridges, and frontage roads.

By 1962, Louisiana had already built over 65 miles (105 km) of Interstate Highways with a total cost of $135,001,873. Burgess stated that $66,811,655 was for construction, while $68,190,218 was for purchase of right of way. The state was aiming to build over 686 miles (1,104 km) around the entire area. The construction on I-59 and I-10 from Picayune to New Orleans, was 25% complete with the Pearl River bridges still to be complete, now at a cost of $345,000. A 3.5-mile (5.6 km) stretch of the Interstate was opened on July 1, 1963, just south of the Mississippi state line, at 10:00 am, with a dedication ceremony being held. In addition, it also extended the length of the existing 5.5 miles (8.9 km) located at the Pearl River bridge, and added an interchange for US 11 in order to allow travelers to continue south for New Orleans. This section was designed by W. R. Aldrich Construction with an estimated cost of $3,800,000. Additionally, the four-mile (6.4 km) stretch from the end of the completed highway to Slidell became under construction. In 1964, I-59 was almost entirely completed, with a few miles remaining to build, and a 2.9-mile (4.7 km) stretch going northward to the Mississippi state line and connecting with I-59, the Pearl River Turnaround, remained the last project to complete before opening the Interstate. On December 21, 1965, the I-10 Twin Span Bridge was dedicated to the public. At a length of 5.4 miles (8.7 km), it allowed travelers to make a continuous journey from Slidell to New Orleans. The opening of the bridges also filled up the final gap in I-59, allowing travelers to make a continuous journey from Slidell to New Orleans.

== Exit list ==
The entire route is in St. Tammany Parish.

Location	mi	km	Exit	Destinations	Notes
Slidell	0.00	0.00	1	I-10 / I-12 west – New Orleans, Bay St. Louis, Hammond	Southern terminus of I-59; eastern terminus of I-12; signed as exits 1A (I-12), 1B (I-10 east), and 1C (I-10 west); I-10 exit 267; I-12 exit 85
	3.42	5.50	3	US 11 south / LA 1090 south – Pearl River	Southern end of US 11 concurrency; northern terminus of LA 1090
Pearl River	5.17	8.32	5A	LA 3081 – Pearl River	Northern terminus of LA 3081
Pearl River	6.26	10.07	5B	Honey Island Swamp	Access to Old US 11
	11.64	18.73	11	Pearl River Turnaround	
	12.06	19.41		I-59 north / US 11 north – Hattiesburg	Continuation into Mississippi across the Pearl River
1.000 mi = 1.609 km; 1.000 km = 0.621 mi: Concurrency terminus
