= Baptist, Louisiana =

- Unincorporated community
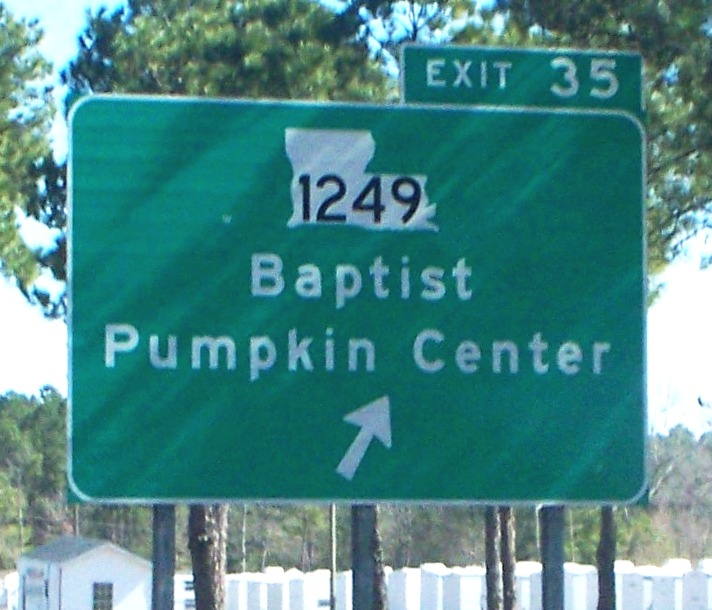

- Location within Louisiana Location within the United States
- Coordinates: 30°30′18″N 90°31′59″W
- Country: United States
- State: Louisiana
- Parish: Tangipahoa
- Elevation: 12 ft (3.7 m)
- Time zone: UTC-6 (Central (CST))
  - Summer (DST): UTC-5 (CDT)
- Area code: 985
- GNIS feature ID: 532308

Baptist is an unincorporated community in Tangipahoa Parish, Louisiana, United States. Baptist is located on U.S. Route 190, west of Hammond.
