= Bush, Louisiana =

Bush Duncan McClendon
- Unincorporated community
- Location of Bush in Louisiana
- Coordinates: 30°36′32″N 89°54′00″W
- Country: United States
- State: Louisiana
- Parish: St. Tammany
- Elevation: 82 ft (25 m)
- Time zone: UTC-6 (CST)
  - Summer (DST): UTC-5 (CDT)
- ZIP code: 70431
- Area code: 985

Bush is an unincorporated community in northeastern St. Tammany Parish, Louisiana, United States. Bush is on Louisiana Highway 21 south of Sun connecting to Bogalusa . It is part of the New Orleans–Metairie–Kenner Metropolitan Statistical Area. Highway 21 crosses the Bogue Chitto River approximately 1.45 miles (2.33 km) north of town.

== Education ==
St. Tammany Parish Public Schools includes all of St. Tammany Parish.

Fifth Ward Junior High School in unincorporated St. Tammany Parish serves K-8.

Covington High School in Covington serves Bush residents.

The Bush Branch of the St. Tammany Parish Library serves local residents.

St. Tammany Parish is within the service areas of two community colleges: Northshore Technical Community College and Delgado Community College.
