= Talisheek, Louisiana =

- Unincorporated community
- Location within Louisiana Location within the United States
- Coordinates: 30°31′58″N 89°52′36″W
- Country: United States
- State: Louisiana
- Parish: St. Tammany
- Elevation: 59 ft (18 m)
- Time zone: UTC-6 (Central (CST))
  - Summer (DST): UTC-5 (CDT)
- ZIP code: 70464
- Area code: 985
- GNIS feature ID: 1628324
- FIPS code: 22-74585

Talisheek is an unincorporated community in St. Tammany Parish, Louisiana, United States. Talisheek is located on Louisiana Highway 435, 14 miles (23 km) east-northeast of Covington. Talisheek has a post office with ZIP code 70464.

== Etymology ==
The name is derived from the word talushik which means rock, gravel or pebble in the Choctaw language.
