= St. Tammany Parish, Louisiana =

Parish in Louisiana, United States

St. Tammany Parish
- Parish
- Parish of St. Tammany; Paroisse de Saint-Tammany (French); Parroquia de St. Tammany (Spanish). Louisiana Creole French Parwas Sen Tammany
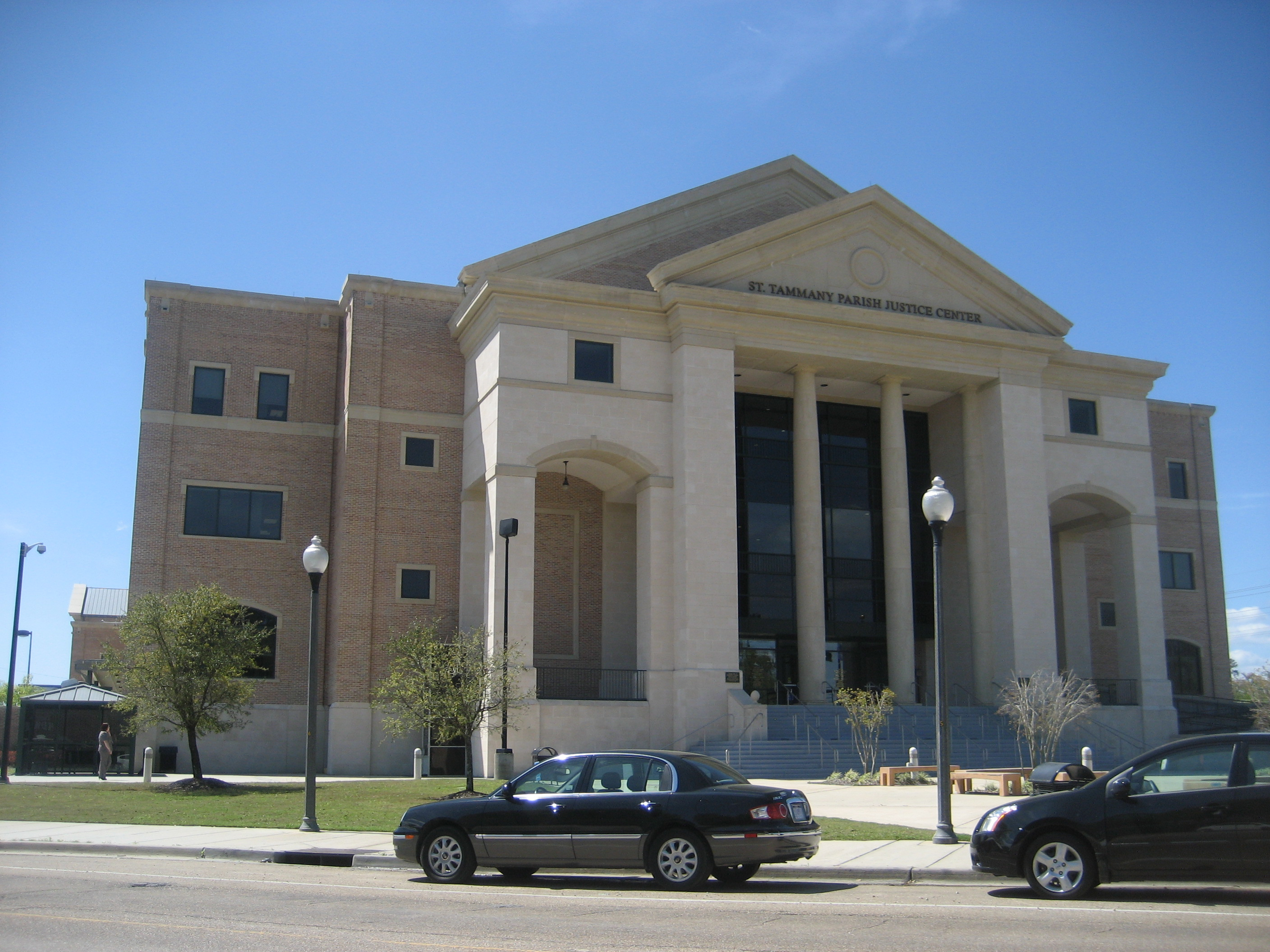
- St. Tammany Parish Justice Center in Covington

- Flag Seal

- Location within the U.S. state of Louisiana
- Coordinates: 30°24′N 89°58′W
- Country: United States
- State: Louisiana
- Founded: October 27, 1810
- Named for: Indian Chief Tamanend
- Seat: Covington
- Largest city: Slidell

Area
  - Total: 1,124 sq mi (2,910 km^{2})
  - Land: 846 sq mi (2,190 km^{2})
  - Water: 279 sq mi (720 km^{2}) 25%

Population (2020)
  - Total: 264,570
  - Estimate (2025): 279,108 ▲
  - Density: 312.73/sq mi (120.75/km^{2})
- Time zone: UTC−6 (Central)
  - Summer (DST): UTC−5 (CDT)
- Congressional district: 1st
- Website: www.stpgov.org

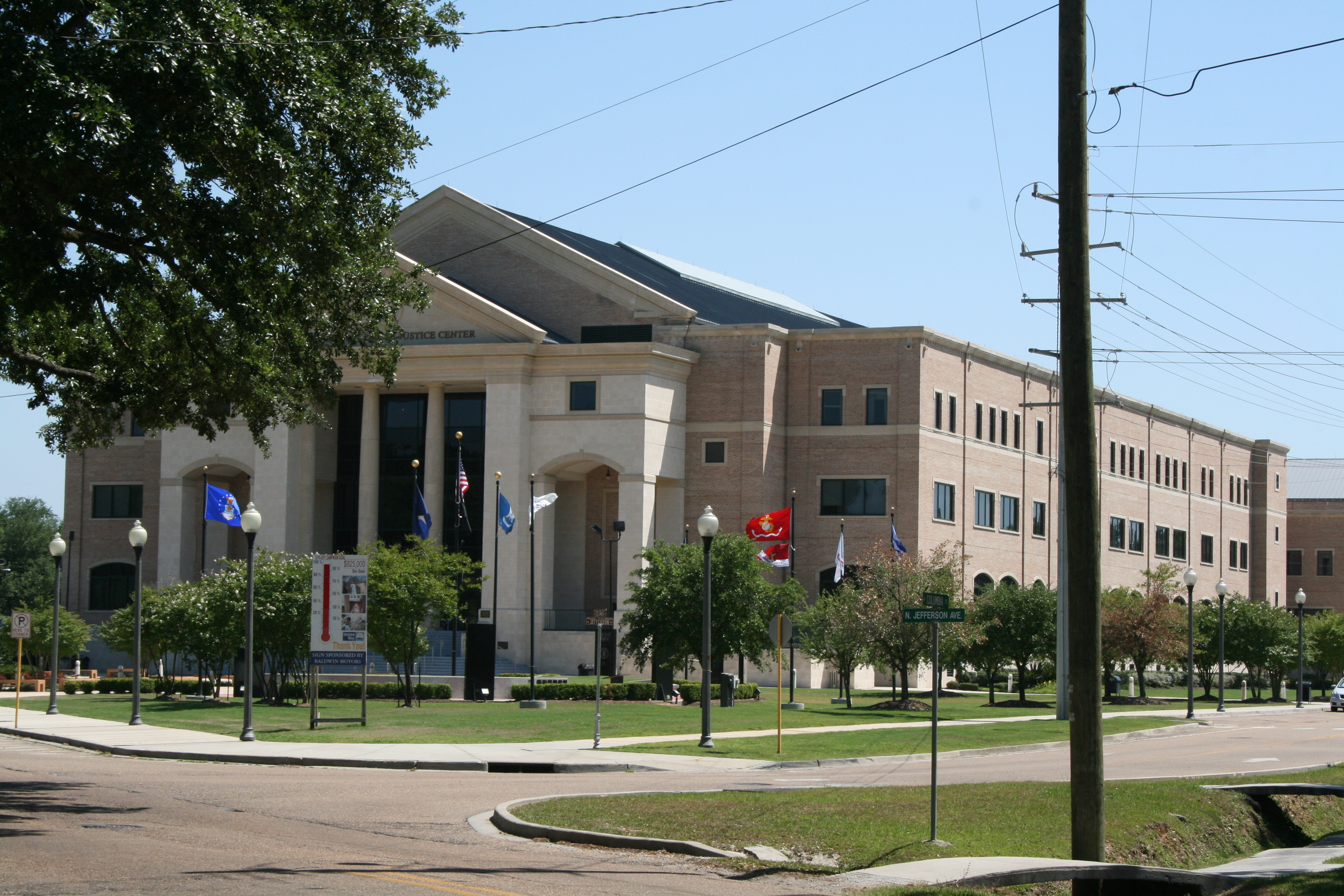
St. Tammany Parish Justice Center in Covington

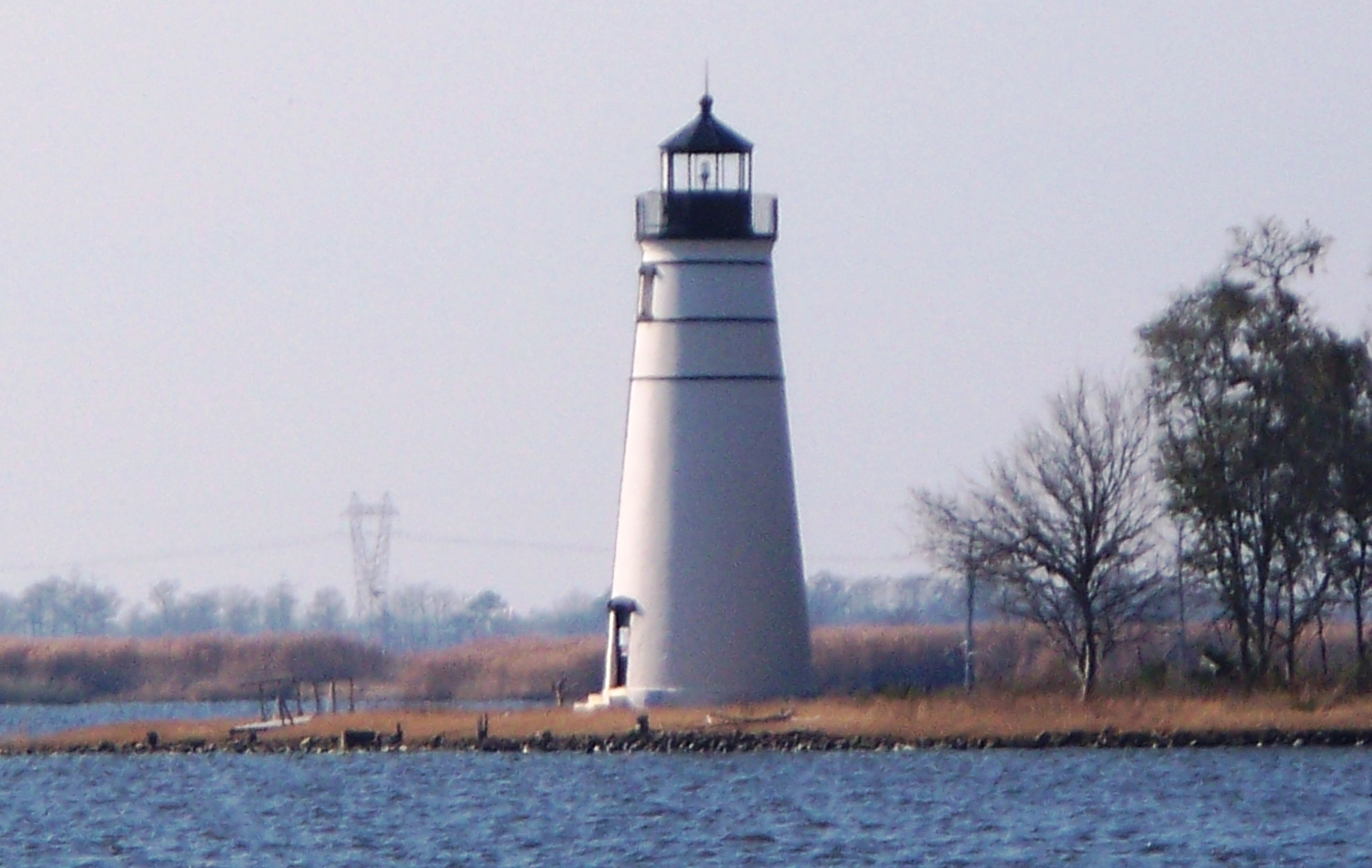
Madisonville's Tchefuncte River Lighthouse stands on the Saint Tammany Northshore of Lake Pontchartrain. This lighthouse was built in 1837.

St. Tammany Parish (French: Paroisse de Saint-Tammany; Spanish: Parroquia de St. Tammany; Louisiana Creole French: Parwas Sen Tammany) is a parish located in the U.S. state of Louisiana named after Tamanend, the famed Lenape Chief of Chiefs and the "Patron Saint of America." At the 2020 census, the population was 264,570, making it the fourth-most populous parish in Louisiana. The parish seat is Covington. The parish was founded in 1810.

St. Tammany Parish comprises the Slidell–Mandeville–Covington metropolitan statistical area, which is also included in the New Orleans–Metairie–Slidell combined statistical area. St. Tammany Parish is one of the fastest-growing parishes in the state, along with Livingston and Ascension. The population has quadrupled since 1970, and is expected to double again by 2030, expecting to diversify the population of the parish. Though it was not heavily directly damaged by Hurricane Katrina, the community is growing in large part due to subsequent displacement of populations, with many coming from the New Orleans metropolitan area seeking to avoid hurricane and weather-related threats, caused in part due to climate change.

== History ==
=== Pre-history ===
St. Tammany was originally inhabited by numerous Indian peoples, including the Colapissas, Bayou Goulas, Chickasaw, Biloxi, Choctaw and Pensacola nations (although Frederick S. Ellis, in his book St. Tammany Parish: L'autre Côté du Lac, claims that the regionally prominent Choctaw tribe did not arrive in the area until after it had begun to be settled by Europeans).

In 1699, Pierre Le Moyne d'Iberville, a French explorer, was the first European to visit the area of present-day St. Tammany Parish. While exploring lakes Pontchartrain and Maurepas, Iberville wrote in his journal, "The place where I am is one of the prettiest I have seen, fine level ground bare of canes. The land north of the lakes is a country of pine trees mixed with hard woods. The soil is sandy and many tracks of buffalo and deer can be seen."

=== West Florida ===
After the 18th-century founding and development of New Orleans, French settlers began to enter the region. The primary industry was the production of pitch, tar, turpentine and resin from the forests.

After France was defeated in the French and Indian War, St. Tammany (along with the other future "Florida Parishes") became part of British West Florida. During this period, the area comprising today's St. Tammany attracted British loyalists who wanted to escape persecution in the Thirteen Colonies. After Great Britain was defeated in the American Revolutionary War, West Florida was governed by the Spanish. The West Florida period ended with the West Florida revolt, which precipitated annexation by the United States.

=== Creation and naming of the parish ===
In 1810, President James Madison annexed West Florida as part of the United States and had Governor William C. C. Claiborne incorporate the area into the Territory of Orleans. Claiborne established the boundaries of the Florida Parishes with the creation of its first four parishes: East Baton Rouge, Feliciana, St. Helena, and St. Tammany. St. Tammany Parish was named after the Delaware Indian Chief Tamanend (c.1628-1698), who made peace with William Penn and was generally renowned for his goodness. Among the nine Louisiana parishes named after saints, St. Tammany is the only one whose eponym is not a saint of the Catholic Church, the ecclesiastical parishes of which had formed the basis for the state's civil parishes. Tamanend is not known to have been Roman Catholic or Christian, but he had been popularly revered as a "Patron Saint of America" since the post-Revolutionary period, long after his death.

=== 19th century ===
In the early 1830s, there were only two towns in St. Tammany: Covington, a retreat with summer homes and hotels; and Madisonville, a shipbuilding and sawmill town. The area south of Covington to Lake Pontchartrain's northern shore and extending eastwards to the Pearl River border with the state of Mississippi was known as the Covington Lowlands. This region included the present-day towns of Mandeville, Abita Springs, Lacombe, Slidell, and Pearl River.

Mandeville was founded in 1834 by Bernard de Marigny de Mandeville and was developed as a health resort for wealthy New Orleanians, because it was believed that ozone was both salutary and naturally emitted by the numerous trees in the area (both beliefs later proven false), giving rise to an early name for the region — the "Ozone Belt".

Regular ferry service commenced across Lake Pontchartrain, and shortly thereafter another resort community was founded, Abita Springs. A railroad was constructed in the 1880s connecting Covington and Abita Springs to Mandeville and to New Orleans, allowing for further growth, particularly in Abita Springs, where underground spring waters permitted supposedly healthful baths.

=== 20th century ===
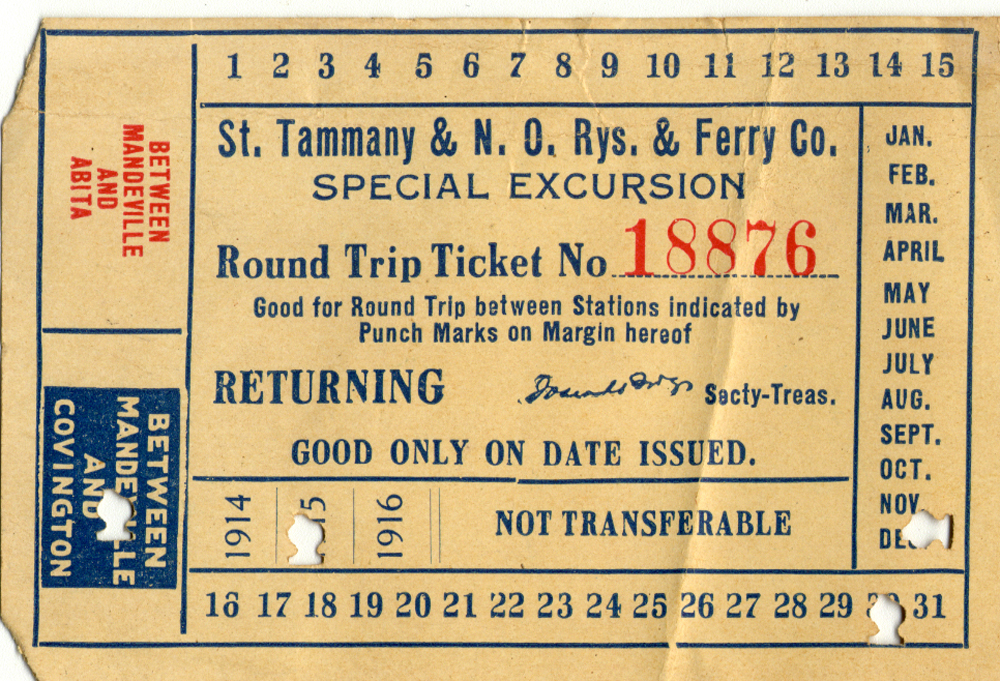
Round-trip trolley ticket on the St. Tammany and New Orleans Railways and Ferry Co., punched to be good on the transit line between Mandeville and Covington, Louisiana, for the date of December 30, 1915

With the completion of high-speed road connections to St. Tammany from New Orleans and its older suburbs (Lake Pontchartrain Causeway, the I-10 Twin Span Bridge), the parish began to develop as a bedroom community. Suburban sprawl first took root in and around Slidell, Louisiana, in the eastern part of the parish. Though the Causeway was completed in 1956 and linked suburban Metairie with western St. Tammany, growth in and around western St. Tammany towns like Mandeville, Covington, and Madisonville only gathered momentum in the late 1960s.

Following a vote in 1998 approving a home rule charter, the parish changed from its police jury system to the president-council form of government in 2000.

=== 21st century ===
While St. Tammany was sparsely populated and almost wholly rural in the 1950s, its population exceeded 200,000 in the wake of Hurricane Katrina's landfall in 2005.

A major event in the parish's transition from a bedroom community of commuters to a more diverse and independent economic unit occurred in 2008 with the relocation of Chevron's regional corporate headquarters from downtown New Orleans to an office park outside of Covington.

One of the parish's most powerful figures was Jack Strain, who served as St. Tammany sheriff from 1996 to 2016. After losing his bid for a sixth term, Strain was the subject of a federal corruption investigation into his privatizing a parish work release program in exchange for kickbacks. After being charged with 16 federal counts, Strain agreed to plead guilty to one count of bribery. But the federal investigation also uncovered accusations of sexual abuse involving juveniles. Strain was charged with four counts of aggravated rape, two counts of aggravated incest and one count each of sexual battery and indecent behavior with a juvenile. In 2021, he was found guilty on all counts and sentenced to four life terms in prison.

=== Hurricane Katrina effects ===
Hurricane Katrina made its final landfall in eastern St. Tammany Parish. The western eye wall passed directly over St. Tammany Parish as a Category 3 hurricane at about 9:45 AM CST, August 29, 2005. The communities of Slidell, Avery Estates, Lakeshore Estates, Oak Harbor, Eden Isles and Northshore Beach were inundated by the storm surge that extended over 6 miles (10 km) inland. The storm surge impacted all 57 miles (92 km) of St. Tammany Parish's coastline, including Lacombe, Mandeville and Madisonville. The storm surge in the area of the Rigolets Pass was estimated at 16 feet (4.9 m), not including wave action, declining to 7 feet (2.1 m) at Madisonville. The surge had a second peak in eastern St. Tammany as the westerly winds from the southern eye wall pushed the surge to the east, backing up at the bottleneck of the Rigolets Pass.

The twin spans of I-10 bridges between Slidell and New Orleans East were virtually destroyed, and much of I-10 in New Orleans East was under water. The Lake Pontchartrain Causeway and the U.S. Highway 11 bridge, connecting the north and south shores of Lake Pontchartrain, were open only to emergency traffic.

Initial search and rescue operations were conducted south of U.S. Highway 190 from Lacombe east to the state line. Fire District No. 1 and the St. Tammany Parish Sheriff's office evacuated over 3,000 people from flooded homes and rescued about 300 people in imminent danger. Radio communications among first responders functioned throughout the rescue period, but the 9-1-1 system was not operational for ten days. Utility services were not available anywhere in the parish. Generator power was available for hospitals and a special needs shelter. Hospitals were running at capacity on generator power.

The hurricane-force winds toppled trees and telephone poles parish-wide, blocking all transportation routes. Land debris cleanup continued into 2007, with over 6.6 million cubic yards (5 million m^{3}) collected. Debris cleaning in waterways continued at least through 2009. Hurricane Katrina damaged 48,792 housing units in St. Tammany Parish from flood waters, high winds, or both.

== Geography ==
According to the U.S. Census Bureau, the parish has a total area of 1,124 square miles (2,910 km^{2}), of which 846 square miles (2,190 km^{2}) is land and 279 square miles (720 km^{2}) (25%) is water. It is located to the north of Lake Pontchartrain.

=== Major highways ===
- Interstate 10
- Interstate 12
- Interstate 59
- U.S. Highway 11
- U.S. Highway 90
- U.S. Highway 190
  - US 190 Bus. (Covington)
  - US 190 Bus. (Slidell)
- Louisiana Highway 16
- Louisiana Highway 21
- Louisiana Highway 22
- Louisiana Highway 25
- Louisiana Highway 36
- Louisiana Highway 40
- Louisiana Highway 41
- Louisiana Highway 59
- Louisiana Highway 433
- Louisiana Highway 434
- Louisiana Highway 435
- Louisiana Highway 437
- Louisiana Highway 450
- Louisiana Highway 1077
- Louisiana Highway 1078
- Louisiana Highway 1083
- Louisiana Highway 1084
- Louisiana Highway 1085
- Louisiana Highway 1088
- Louisiana Highway 1090
- Louisiana Highway 1091
- Louisiana Highway 1093-1
- Louisiana Highway 1093-3
- Louisiana Highway 1129
- Louisiana Highway 3081
- Louisiana Highway 3241
- Louisiana Highway 3292
- Lake Pontchartrain Causeway

=== Adjacent counties and parishes ===
- Washington Parish (north)
- Pearl River County, Mississippi (northeast)
- Hancock County, Mississippi (east)
- Orleans Parish (south)
- Jefferson Parish (southwest)
- St. Bernard Parish (southeast)
- Tangipahoa Parish (west)

=== National protected areas ===
- Big Branch Marsh National Wildlife Refuge
- Bogue Chitto National Wildlife Refuge (part)

=== State protected areas ===
- Pearl River Wildlife Management Area
- Lake Ramsey Savannah Wildlife Management Area

=== State parks ===
- Fairview-Riverside State Park
- Fontainebleau State Park

=== Communities ===
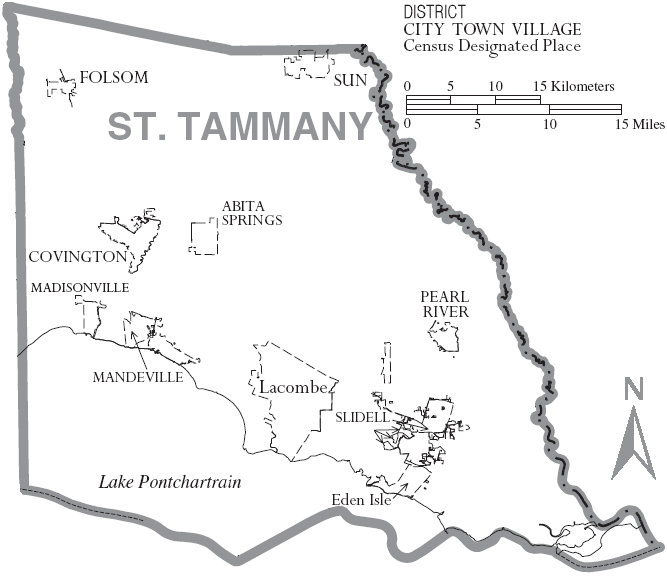
Map of St. Tammany Parish, with municipal labels

==== Cities ====
- Covington (parish seat)
- Mandeville
- Slidell (largest municipality)

==== Towns ====
- Abita Springs
- Madisonville
- Pearl River

==== Villages ====
- Folsom
- Sun

===== Census-designated places =====
- Eden Isle
- Lacombe
- Lewisburg

===== Unincorporated communities =====
- Alton
- Audubon
- Barker's Corner
- Big Branch
- Blond
- Bonfouca
- Bush
- Chinchuba
- Colt
- Crawford Landing
- Dave
- Davis Landing
- Florenville
- Goodbee
- Haaswood
- Houltonville
- Hickory
- Maude
- McClane City
- Morgan Bluff
- North Slidell
- Oaklawn
- St. Benedict
- St. Joe
- St. Tammany
- St. Tammany Corner
- Talisheek
- Waldheim
- White Kitchen

== Demographics ==
Historical population
Census	Pop.	Note	%±
1820	1,723		—
1830	2,864		66.2%
1840	4,598		60.5%
1850	6,364		38.4%
1860	5,406		−15.1%
1870	5,586		3.3%
1880	6,887		23.3%
1890	10,160		47.5%
1900	13,335		31.3%
1910	18,917		41.9%
1920	20,645		9.1%
1930	20,929		1.4%
1940	23,624		12.9%
1950	26,988		14.2%
1960	38,643		43.2%
1970	68,585		77.5%
1980	110,869		61.7%
1990	144,508		30.3%
2000	191,268		32.4%
2010	233,740		22.2%
2020	264,570		13.2%
2025 (est.)	279,108	▲	5.5%
U.S. Decennial Census; 1790-1960 1900-1990; 1990-2000 2010 2020

St. Tammany Parish, Louisiana – Racial and ethnic composition Note: the US Census treats Hispanic/Latino as an ethnic category. This table excludes Latinos from the racial categories and assigns them to a separate category. Hispanics/Latinos may be of any race.
Race / Ethnicity (NH = Non-Hispanic)	Pop 1980	Pop 1990	Pop 2000	Pop 2010	Pop 2020	% 1980	% 1990	% 2000	% 2010	% 2020
White alone (NH)	94,091	124,191	163,061	188,317	192,144	84.87%	85.94%	85.25%	80.57%	72.63%
Black or African American alone (NH)	13,660	15,778	18,788	26,430	33,969	12.32%	10.92%	9.82%	11.31%	12.84%
Native American or Alaska Native alone (NH)	305	504	788	1,031	876	0.28%	0.35%	0.41%	0.44%	0.33%
Asian alone (NH)	346	731	1,413	2,914	3,814	0.31%	0.51%	0.74%	1.25%	1.44%
Native Hawaiian or Pacific Islander alone (NH)	x	x	52	73	105	x	x	0.03%	0.03%	0.04%
Other race alone (NH)	212	134	387	606	1,352	0.19%	0.09%	0.20%	0.26%	0.51%
Mixed race or Multiracial (NH)	x	x	2,042	3,399	11,466	x	x	1.07%	1.45%	4.33%
Hispanic or Latino (any race)	2,255	3,170	4,737	10,970	20,844	2.03%	2.19%	2.48%	4.69%	7.88%
Total	110,869	144,508	191,268	233,740	264,570	100.00%	100.00%	100.00%	100.00%	100.00%

Per the 2020 United States census, there were 264,570 people, 94,988 households, and 65,335 families residing in the parish. At the 2019 census estimates, there were 255,155 people living in the parish, up from 233,740 at the 2010 U.S. census, and 191,268 at the 2000 census. There were 92,962 households spread out among 102.909 housing units. The racial and ethnic makeup of the parish was 82.8% non-Hispanic white, 12.1% African American, 0.6% Native American, 1.6% Asian, 1.0% some other race, and 1.9% two or more races. Approximately 5.6% of the population was Hispanic and Latin American of any race.

Among the households, the median age was 40.2, and 6.0% of the population were under 5 years of age; 75.9% were aged 18 and older, and 16.4% were aged 65 and older. Culturally, 16.4% of the population were of French ancestry, and 15.5% were German. Irish heritage was 12.2% of the population, and Italians made up 11.3% of the parish. Sub-Saharan African heritage was 0.4% of the population in 2019. The second most-spoken language in St. Tammany Parish was Spanish (4.0%).

Among the population at the 2019 census estimates, 78.4% lived in owner-occupied housing units and the median home value was $218,500. The median gross rent was $1,086 and the median household income was $68,905. An estimated 11.5% of the population lived at or below the poverty line. The employment rate was 56.9%.

Religiously, Christianity has dominated the area since European colonization. Among the Christian denominations prevalent throughout the parish, Roman Catholicism has remained the largest with 145,007 members, followed by Baptists and non/inter-denominational Protestants per the Association of Religion Data Archives in 2020.

== Politics ==
St. Tammany Parish has heavily favored Republican politicians; the last Democratic presidential candidate to carry the parish was John F. Kennedy in 1960. In 2008, John McCain received 76% of the vote (83,078 votes) in the parish, despite losing to Democrat Barack Obama nationally by a substantial margin. In the 2008 U.S. Senate election, incumbent Democrat Mary Landrieu was re-elected, but lost the parish to Republican John Kennedy, with Kennedy winning 61% of the vote (65,150 votes) in the parish to Landrieu's 36% (39,429 votes). In 2004, Republican George W. Bush won 75% of the vote (75,139 votes) to Democrat John Kerry’s 24% (24,662 votes). The increase in the Republican margin of victory since 2004 has been attributed in part to the relocation of numerous, typically Republican, St. Bernard Parish residents to St. Tammany Parish in the aftermath of post-Hurricane Katrina. In the 2024 presidential election, Donald Trump won the parish with 71.1% of the vote to Kamala Harris's 27.3%.

United States presidential election results for St. Tammany Parish, Louisiana
Year	Republican		Democratic		Third party(ies)	
Year	No.	%	No.	%	No.	%
1912	30	3.69%	668	82.27%	114	14.04%
1916	95	10.65%	782	87.67%	15	1.68%
1920	276	22.20%	967	77.80%	0	0.00%
1924	269	20.52%	969	73.91%	73	5.57%
1928	945	34.29%	1,811	65.71%	0	0.00%
1932	178	5.25%	3,206	94.60%	5	0.15%
1936	594	14.59%	3,477	85.41%	0	0.00%
1940	668	12.99%	4,475	87.01%	0	0.00%
1944	703	16.93%	3,450	83.07%	0	0.00%
1948	790	15.67%	1,164	23.09%	3,087	61.24%
1952	3,598	44.62%	4,465	55.38%	0	0.00%
1956	3,965	51.90%	3,373	44.15%	301	3.94%
1960	2,850	25.76%	5,179	46.81%	3,034	27.42%
1964	7,883	54.08%	6,694	45.92%	0	0.00%
1968	4,846	23.34%	4,445	21.41%	11,470	55.25%
1972	15,438	74.13%	3,949	18.96%	1,438	6.91%
1976	15,822	50.39%	14,691	46.79%	886	2.82%
1980	27,214	63.74%	14,161	33.17%	1,323	3.10%
1984	38,664	76.15%	11,719	23.08%	392	0.77%
1988	38,334	69.92%	15,638	28.52%	851	1.55%
1992	37,839	56.54%	19,735	29.49%	9,347	13.97%
1996	44,761	60.06%	24,281	32.58%	5,484	7.36%
2000	59,193	70.69%	22,722	27.13%	1,822	2.18%
2004	75,139	74.70%	24,665	24.52%	788	0.78%
2008	83,078	75.84%	24,596	22.45%	1,868	1.71%
2012	84,723	75.04%	25,728	22.79%	2,451	2.17%
2016	90,915	73.09%	27,717	22.28%	5,760	4.63%
2020	99,666	71.13%	37,746	26.94%	2,698	1.93%
2024	98,377	71.09%	37,777	27.30%	2,230	1.61%

== Education ==
=== K-12 education ===
St. Tammany Parish Public Schools operates the public schools in all of the parish. They are consistently rated as among the highest-performing in the state such as Mandeville High School, Covington High School, and Fontainebleau High School.

Roman Catholic parochial secondary schools of the Roman Catholic Archdiocese of New Orleans include:

- Archbishop Hannan High School (unincorporated area, Covington address)
- Pope John Paul II Catholic High School (Slidell)

Other private schools include:

- Christ Episcopal School (preschool/kindergarten in Covington, grades 1-12 in an unincorporated area)
- Saint Paul's School (Covington)
- Saint Scholastica Academy (Covington)
- Northlake Christian School (unincorporated, Covington postal address)

=== Tertiary education ===
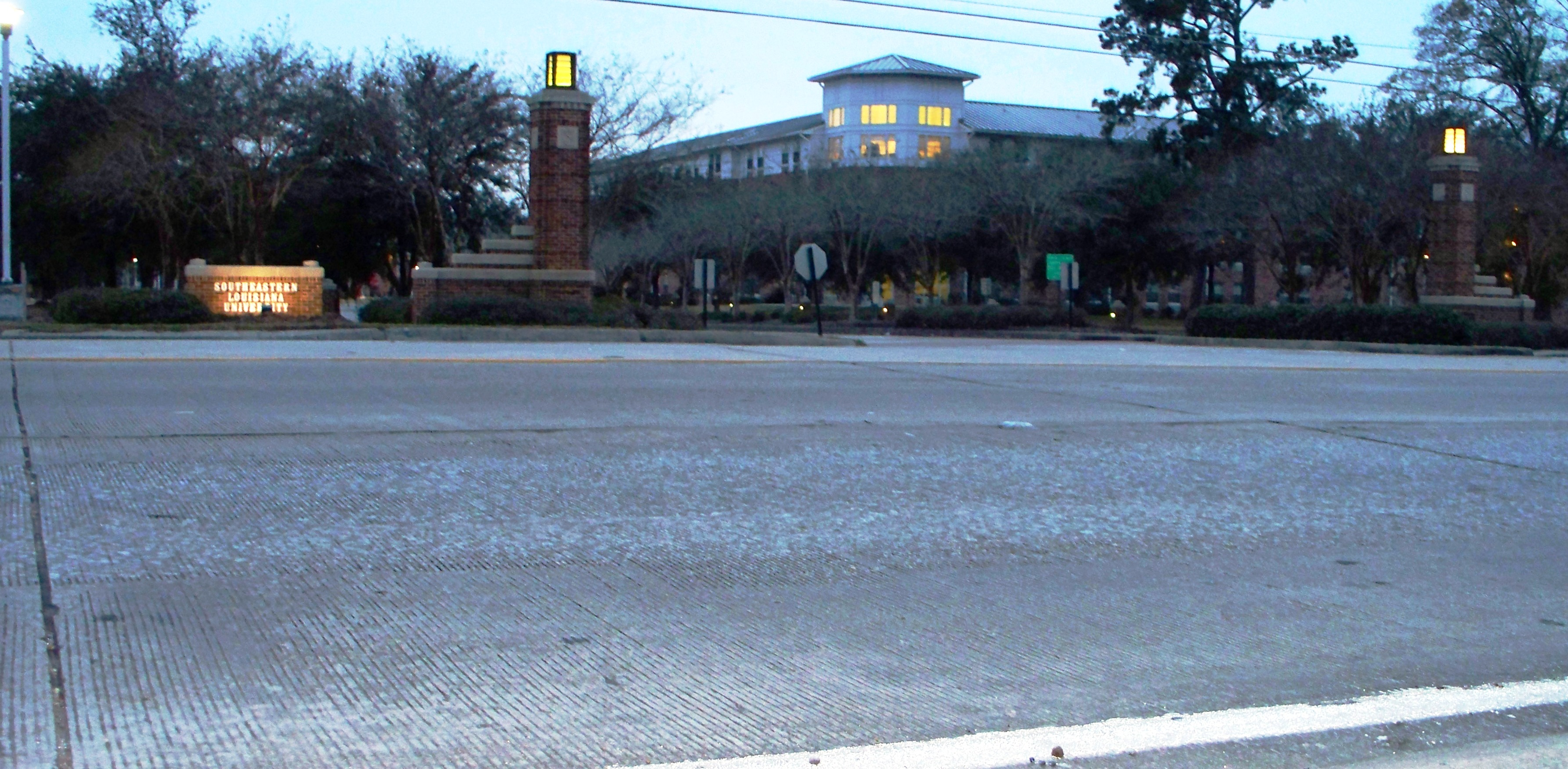
Saint Tammany Hall (background) is the first building students pass on going through the main entrance to Southeastern Louisiana University in Hammond, Louisiana.

St. Tammany Parish is within the service areas of two community colleges: Northshore Technical Community College and Delgado Community College. Northshore Technical Community College has its main campus in Lacombe; this campus was established in January 2017. Additionally Nunez Community College in Chalmette, and the Sidney Collier Campus in East New Orleans of Delgado Community College are in proximity to the parish. Previously Covington and Slidell hosted campuses of Delgado Community College, with Slidell having the Slidell Learning Center and later the Northshore-Slidell campus, and with Covington having the Northshore-Covington Campus. The latter opened in summer 2002. The Slidell campus closed in 2016 due to financial issues.

The parish is the eponym of Saint Tammany Hall on the campus of Southeastern Louisiana University, in neighboring Tangipahoa Parish.

== See also ==
- Lake Pontchartrain
- National Register of Historic Places listings in St. Tammany Parish, Louisiana
- Tammany Trace
