= Abita Springs, Louisiana =

- Town
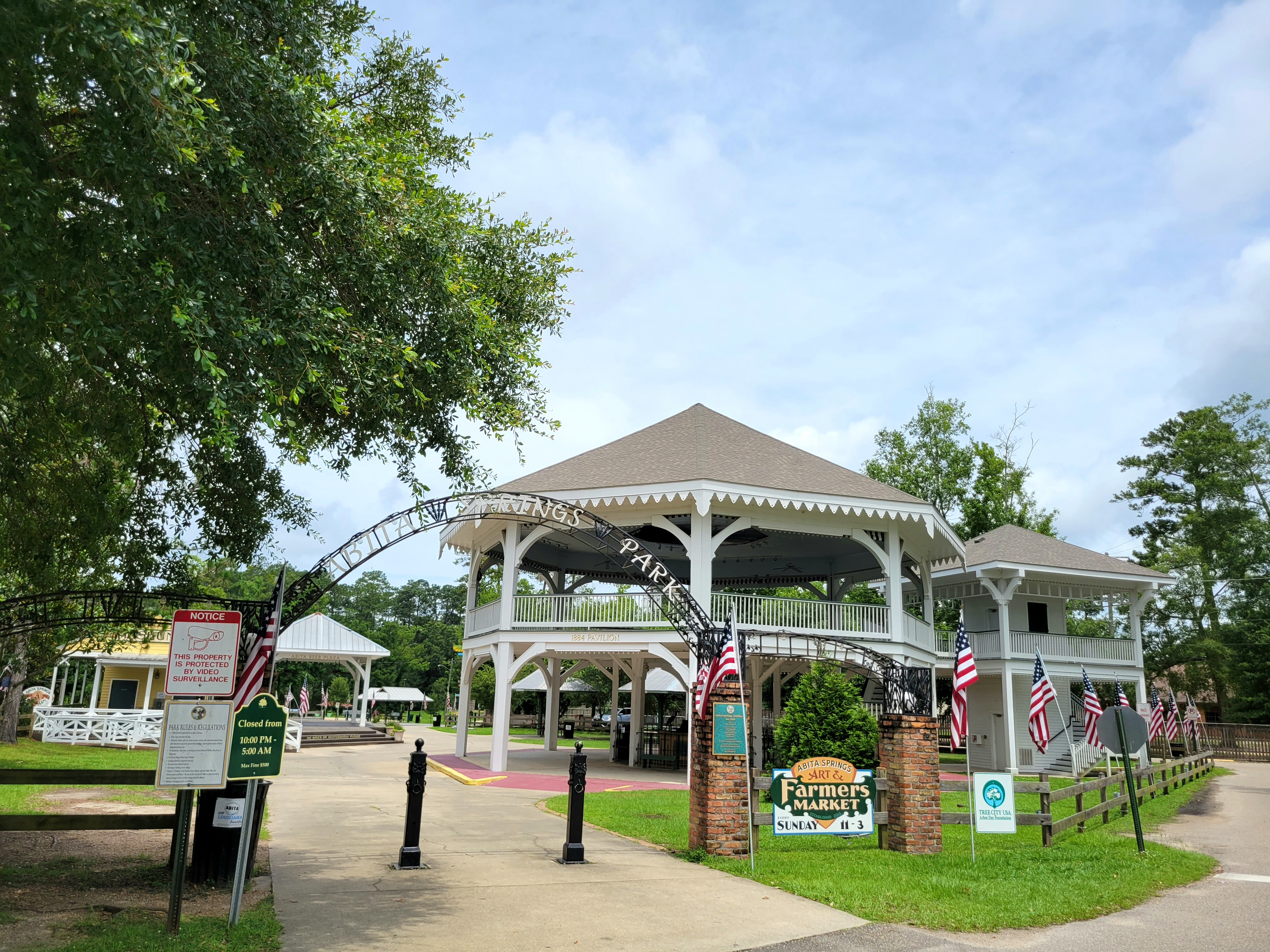
- The pavilion building was originally constructed for the World Cotton Centennial 1884 Worlds Fair in New Orleans
- Motto: "Where Nature Performs Miracles"
- Location of Abita Springs in St. Tammany Parish, Louisiana

- Location of Louisiana in the United States
- Coordinates: 30°28′34″N 90°02′06″W
- Country: United States
- State: Louisiana
- Parish: St. Tammany
- Incorporated: 1903

Government
  - Mayor: "Dan" Curtis (R) (unseated Greg Lemons, December 8, 2018)

Area
  - Total: 4.60 sq mi (11.91 km^{2})
  - Land: 4.59 sq mi (11.88 km^{2})
  - Water: 0.0077 sq mi (0.02 km^{2})

Population (2020)
  - Total: 2,631
  - Density: 573.4/sq mi (221.39/km^{2})
- Time zone: UTC-6 (CST)
  - Summer (DST): UTC-5 (CDT)
- Area code: 985
- FIPS code: 22-00240
- Website: www.townofabitasprings.com

Abita Springs is a town in St. Tammany Parish, Louisiana, United States. As of the 2020 census, Abita Springs had a population of 2,631. It is part of the New Orleans–Metairie–Kenner metropolitan statistical area.

== History ==
Abita Springs was originally a Choctaw Indian village, taking its name from nearby medicinal springs. The Choctaw burial and execution grounds, which were in use up until around 1880, are located nearby.

== Geography ==
Abita Springs is located at 30°28′34″N 90°2′6″W (30.476233, -90.035138).

According to the United States Census Bureau, the town has a total area of 4.5 square miles (11.6 km^{2}), all land.

== Demographics ==
Historical population
| Census | Pop. | Note | %± |
|---|---|---|---|
| 1910 | 365 | | — |
| 1920 | 388 | | 6.3% |
| 1930 | 471 | | 21.4% |
| 1940 | 528 | | 12.1% |
| 1950 | 559 | | 5.9% |
| 1960 | 655 | | 17.2% |
| 1970 | 839 | | 28.1% |
| 1980 | 1,072 | | 27.8% |
| 1990 | 1,296 | | 20.9% |
| 2000 | 1,957 | | 51.0% |
| 2010 | 2,365 | | 20.8% |
| 2020 | 2,631 | | 11.2% |
| 2025 (est.) | 2,753 | | 4.6% |
U.S. Decennial Census

Abita Springs racial composition as of 2020
| Race | Number | Percentage |
|---|---|---|
| White (non-Hispanic) | 2,143 | 81.45% |
| Black or African American (non-Hispanic) | 143 | 5.44% |
| Native American | 8 | 0.3% |
| Asian | 9 | 0.34% |
| Pacific Islander | 1 | 0.04% |
| Other/Mixed | 112 | 4.26% |
| Hispanic or Latino | 215 | 8.17% |

As of the 2020 United States census, there were 2,631 people, 1,010 households, and 636 families residing in the town.

As of the census of 2000, there were 1,957 people, 757 households, and 550 families residing in the town. The population density was 474.3 inhabitants per square mile (183.1/km^{2}). There were 813 housing units at an average density of 197.1 per square mile (76.1/km^{2}). The racial makeup of the town was 95.30% White, 3.01% African American, 0.31% Native American, 0.36% Asian, 0.31% from other races, and 0.72% from two or more races. 1.79% of the population were Hispanic, or Latino of any race.

There were 757 households, out of which 37.5% had children under the age of 18 living with them, 58.0% were married couples living together, 12.2% had a female householder with no husband present, and 27.3% were non-families. 22.3% of all households were made up of individuals, and 8.9% had someone living alone who was 65 years of age or older. The average household size was 2.59 and the average family size was 3.07.

In the town, the population was spread out, with 28.5% under the age of 18, 6.1% from 18 to 24, 32.0% from 25 to 44, 22.7% from 45 to 64, and 10.6% who were 65 years of age or older. The median age was 35 years. For every 100 females, there were 86.7 males. For every 100 females age 18 and over, there were 85.1 males.

The median income for a household in the town was $39,923, and the median income for a family was $45,208. Males had a median income of $36,250 versus $27,368 for females. The per capita income for the town was $16,998. 6.7% of the population and 4.7% of families were below the poverty line. Out of the total population, 4.4% of those under the age of 18 and 11.6% of those 65 and older were living below the poverty line.

== Economy ==
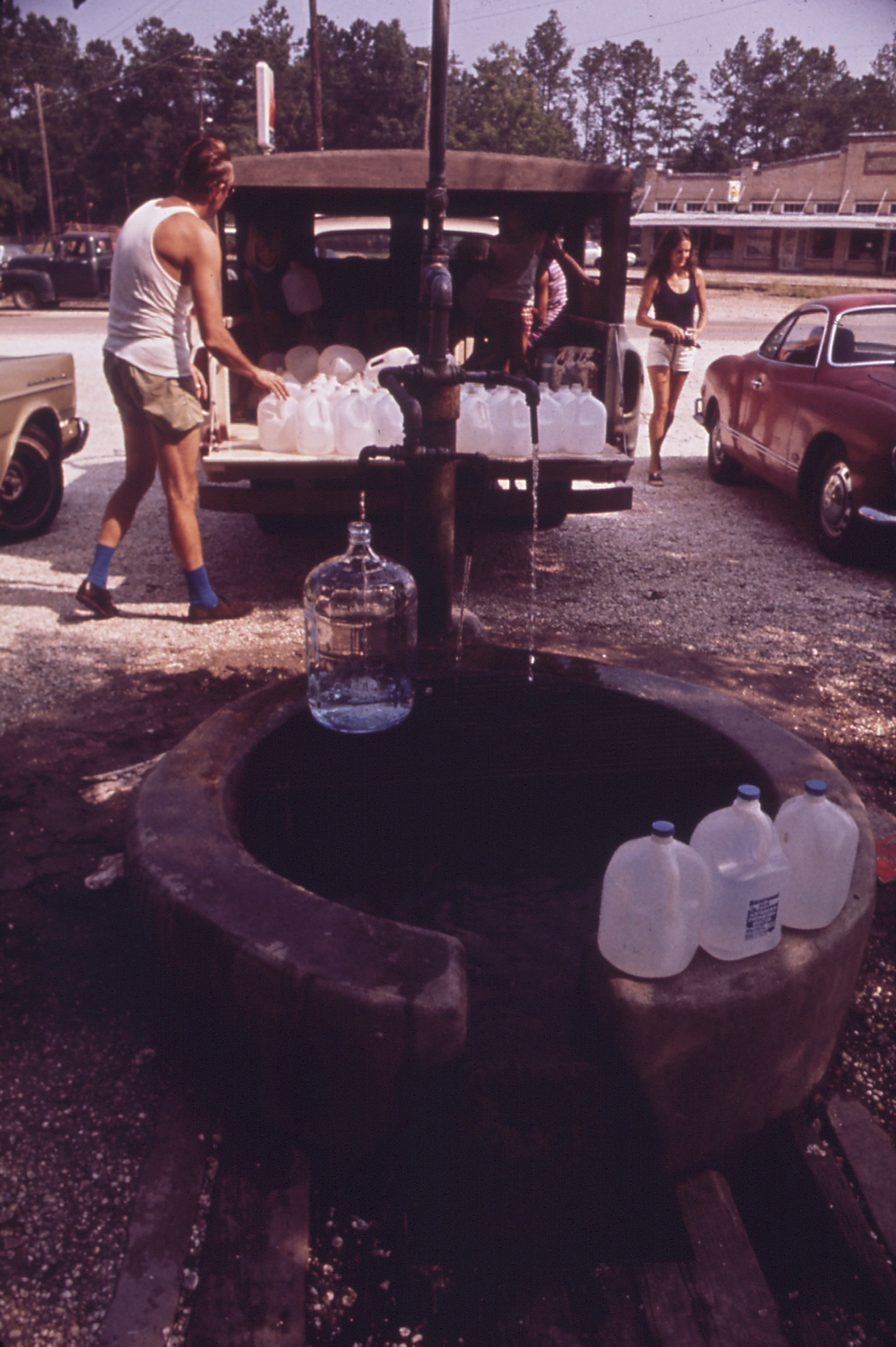
The artesian water at Abita Springs enjoyed regional popularity for more than a century.

The Abita Brewing Company was established in 1986 as a microbrewery, and in 1994, they added a brew pub and restaurant. Abita's beer is brewed with the water of the artesian wells in Abita Springs.

The UCM Museum (pronounced "you see 'em", and also known as the "Abita Mystery House") is an Abita Springs tourist attraction. The museum features an eclectic collection of antiques (particularly electronics and arcade games) and dozens of examples of proprietor John Preble's folk art, which ranges from the whimsical to the macabre.

The Abita Springs Opry is "a non-profit organization dedicated to the presentation and preservation of Louisiana roots music". "The Opry" presents six concerts per year of roots music by performers from throughout the United States. The concerts are presented in the auditorium of the Abita Springs Town Hall. The concerts are broadcast on a number of radio stations and on the Southeastern Channel and public-access television cable TV channels throughout the United States.

== Education ==
St. Tammany Parish Public Schools operates local public schools:

- K-3: Abita Springs Elementary School (Abita Springs)
- 4-6: Abita Springs Middle School (Abita Springs)
- 7-8: Fontainebleau Junior High School (unincorporated St. Tammany Parish)
- 9-12: Fontainebleau High School (unincorporated St. Tammany Parish)

St. Tammany Parish Library operates the Abita Springs Branch.

St. Tammany Parish is within the service areas of two community colleges: Northshore Technical Community College and Delgado Community College.

== Government ==
=== Mayor's Court ===
The town has a Mayor's Court.

== Notable people ==
- Dick Hart, professional golfer
- David Lohr, crime writer
- Bunny Matthews, cartoonist and writer
- Michael G. Strain, veterinarian and the incumbent Louisiana Agriculture and Forestry Commissioner

== See also ==
- List of municipalities in Louisiana
