= National Register of Historic Places listings in Washington Parish, Louisiana =

Location of Washington Parish in Louisiana

This is a list of the National Register of Historic Places listings in Washington Parish, Louisiana.

This is intended to be a complete list of the properties on the National Register of Historic Places in Washington Parish, Louisiana, United States. The locations of National Register properties for which the latitude and longitude coordinates are included below, may be seen in a map.

There are 18 properties listed on the National Register in the parish.

This National Park Service list is complete through NPS recent listings posted December 12, 2025.

== Current listings ==
	Name on the Register	Image	Date listed	Location	City or town	Description
1	Robert H. Babington House	Robert H. Babington House	December 6, 1979 (#79001097)	608 Main St. 30°50′55″N 90°09′27″W	Franklinton	
2	Thomas M. Babington House	Thomas M. Babington House	July 21, 1995 (#95000899)	828 Main St. 30°50′45″N 90°09′28″W	Franklinton	
3	Bogalusa City Hall	Bogalusa City Hall	July 26, 1979 (#79001095)	214 Arkans Hall Ave. 30°47′09″N 89°51′36″W	Bogalusa	
4	Bogalusa Coca Cola Bottling Plant	Bogalusa Coca Cola Bottling Plant	May 21, 2019 (#100003379)	213 Shenandoah St. 30°47′22″N 89°51′55″W	Bogalusa	Now "The Coke Plant" wedding venue
5	Bogalusa Railroad Station	Bogalusa Railroad Station	May 1, 1980 (#80001767)	400 Austin St. 30°47′24″N 89°51′38″W	Bogalusa	
6	Brumfield Homestead	Brumfield Homestead	September 24, 2014 (#14000693)	47082 T.C. Brumfield Rd. 30°54′35″N 90°06′33″W	Franklinton vicinity	
7	Franklinton High School	Franklinton High School	August 6, 1998 (#98000988)	617 Main St. 30°50′58″N 90°09′29″W	Franklinton	
8	Greenlaw House	Greenlaw House	August 6, 1998 (#98000987)	613 10th Ave. 30°51′00″N 90°09′26″W	Franklinton	
9	Robert "Bob" Hicks House	Robert "Bob" Hicks House	January 20, 2015 (#14001174)	924 E. Robert "Bob" Hicks (formerly 9th) St. 30°46′15″N 89°50′48″W	Bogalusa	Home of a prominent local Civil Rights leader of the 1960s.
10	Knight Cabin	Knight Cabin	January 23, 1979 (#79001098)	Washington Parish Fairgrounds; 30°51′18″N 90°09′59″W	Franklinton	
11	Nehemiah Magee House		August 12, 1982 (#82002802)	Southwest of Mt. Hermon; 30°56′35″N 90°19′53″W	Mount Hermon vicinity	
12	Robert D. Magee House	Robert D. Magee House	August 11, 1982 (#82002801)	West of Angie off Louisiana Highway 438; 30°59′02″N 89°55′59″W	Angie vicinity	
13	Bouey Moore Homestead		December 8, 2009 (#09001059)	19068 Moore Rd. 30°47′48″N 89°59′32″W	Franklinton	
14	Sullivan House	Sullivan House	July 27, 1979 (#79001096)	223 S. Border Dr. 30°46′48″N 89°52′08″W	Bogalusa	
15	Sylvest House	Sylvest House	January 23, 1979 (#79001099)	Washington Parish Fairgrounds; 30°51′18″N 90°09′58″W	Franklinton	
16	US Post Office	US Post Office	January 27, 1983 (#83000552)	305 Avenue B 30°46′43″N 89°52′00″W	Bogalusa	
17	D.A. Varnado and Son Store	D.A. Varnado and Son Store	July 25, 2001 (#01000763)	936 Pearl St. 30°50′38″N 90°09′15″W	Franklinton	
18	Warren House	Warren House	December 4, 1998 (#98001442)	29296 Louisiana Highway 25, N. 30°57′02″N 90°10′39″W	Franklinton vicinity	

== See also ==
- List of National Historic Landmarks in Louisiana
- National Register of Historic Places listings in Louisiana
