= Clifford =

Clifford may refer to:

== People ==
- Clifford (name), including a list of people with that name
- William Kingdon Clifford
- Baron Clifford
- Baron Clifford of Chudleigh
- Baron de Clifford
- Clifford baronets
- Clifford family (bankers)
- Jaryd Clifford
- Justice Clifford (disambiguation)
- Lord Clifford (disambiguation)

== Arts, entertainment, and media ==
- Clifford the Big Red Dog, a series of children's books
  - Clifford (character), the central character of Clifford the Big Red Dog
  - Clifford the Big Red Dog (2000 TV series), 2000 animated TV series
  - Clifford's Puppy Days, 2003 animated TV series
  - Clifford's Really Big Movie, 2004 animated movie
  - Clifford the Big Red Dog (2019 TV series), 2019 animated TV series
  - Clifford the Big Red Dog (film), 2021 live-action movie
- Clifford (film), a 1994 film directed by Paul Flaherty
- Clifford (Muppet)

== Mathematics ==
- Clifford algebra, a type of associative algebra, named after William Kingdon Clifford
- Clifford analysis, a mathematical study of Dirac operators
- Clifford module, a mathematical representation
- Clifford theory, dealing with representations, named after Alfred H. Clifford
- Clifford torus, a figure in geometric topology
- Clifford's theorem, any of several mathematical derivations

== Places ==
=== Australia ===
- Clifford, Queensland, a locality in the Western Downs Region

=== Canada ===
- Clifford, Ontario

=== England ===
- Clifford, Devon, a location
- Clifford, Herefordshire
- Clifford (ward), Greater Manchester
- Clifford, West Yorkshire
- Clifford Chambers, Warwickshire

=== United States ===
- Clifford, Illinois
- Clifford, Indiana
- Clifford, Michigan
- Clifford, Missouri
- Clifford, North Dakota
- Clifford, Pennsylvania
- Clifford, Virginia, a community in Amherst County
- Clifford, Wisconsin
- Clifford Township, Butler County, Kansas

== Structures ==
- Clifford Castle, a castle in the village of Clifford, England
- Clifford House (Eustis, Florida), a historic house in the US state of Florida
- Clifford House (Reno, Nevada), a house in the US state of Nevada
- Clifford House, Toowoomba, a heritage-listed house in Queensland, Australia
- Clifford International School, an international school in Guangzhou, People's Republic of China
- Clifford Pier, a pier in Singapore
- Clifford's Inn, a London (England) Inn of Chancery
- Clifford's Tower, the previously used name of York Castle in England
- Clifford-Warren House, a historic house in the US state of Massachusetts

== Other uses ==
- Clifford, a New Zealand Company chartered sailing ship
- Clifford Chance, an international attorney firm headquartered in London, England
- Clifford (horse), a world champion racehorse in the late 19th century
