= Warren House =

Warren House may refer to:

== United Kingdom ==
- Warren House Inn, Dartmoor, Devon, England
- Warren House Colliery, Rawmarsh, South Yorkshire, England

== United States ==
- Russell Warren House, San Francisco, California, listed on the National Register of Historic Places (NRHP) in California
- White-Warren Tenant House, Sandtown, Delaware, NRHP-listed
- Edward Kirk Warren House and Garage, Evanston, Illinois, NRHP-listed
- Warren House Hotel or Old Stone Hotel, Warren, Illinois, NRHP-listed
- Williams-Warren-Zimmerman House, Terre Haute, Indiana, NRHP-listed
- Warren Opera House Block and Hetherington Block, Greenfield, Iowa, NRHP-listed
- McMullin-Warren House, Sebree, Kentucky, listed on the NRHP in Kentucky
- Robert Penn Warren House, Prairieville, Louisiana, NRHP-listed
- Warren House (Franklinton, Louisiana), listed on the NRHP in Louisiana
- David Warren House, Hartford, Maine, NRHP-listed
- Warren, Frederick Fiske and Gretchen Osgood, House, Harvard, Massachusetts, listed on the NRHP in Massachusetts
- Beck-Warren House, Cambridge, Massachusetts, NRHP-listed
- Langford H. Warren House, Cambridge, Massachusetts, NRHP-listed
- Dr. Samuel Warren House, Newton, Massachusetts, NRHP-listed
- Clifford-Warren House, Plymouth, Massachusetts, NRHP-listed
- H. Warren House, Somerville, Massachusetts, NRHP-listed
- Nathan Warren House, Waltham, Massachusetts, NRHP-listed
- Jonah Warren House, Westborough, Massachusetts, NRHP-listed
- Warren, William, Two Rivers House Site and McDougall, Peter, Farmstead, Royalton, Minnesota, listed on the NRHP in Minnesota
- Warren-Erwin House, Washington, Mississippi, listed on the NRHP in Mississippi
- Warren-Guild-Simmons House, Jackson, Mississippi, listed on the NRHP in Mississippi
- Warren's Opera House, Friend, Nebraska listed on the NRHP in Nebraska
- Warren House and Warren's Store, Prospect Hill, North Carolina, listed on the NRHP
- Moses Warren House, Shaker Heights, Ohio, listed on the NRHP in Ohio
- Frank M. Warren House, Portland, Oregon, listed on the NRHP in Oregon
- Daniel Knight Warren House, Warrenton, Oregon, NRHP-listed
- Marcus Warren House, Louisville, Tennessee, listed on the NRHP
- Warren-Crowell House, Terrell, Texas, listed on the NRHP
- Gordon-Baughan-Warren House, Richmond, Virginia, NRHP-listed
- Warren House (Surry, Virginia), listed on the NRHP
- Stephen Warren House, Hartland, Wisconsin, listed on the NRHP
- Nagle-Warren Mansion, Cheyenne, Wyoming, NRHP-listed
