= Coca-Cola Bottling Plant (Bogalusa, Louisiana) =

Historic factory in Louisiana, US

- Bogalusa Coca Cola Bottling Plant
- U.S. National Register of Historic Places
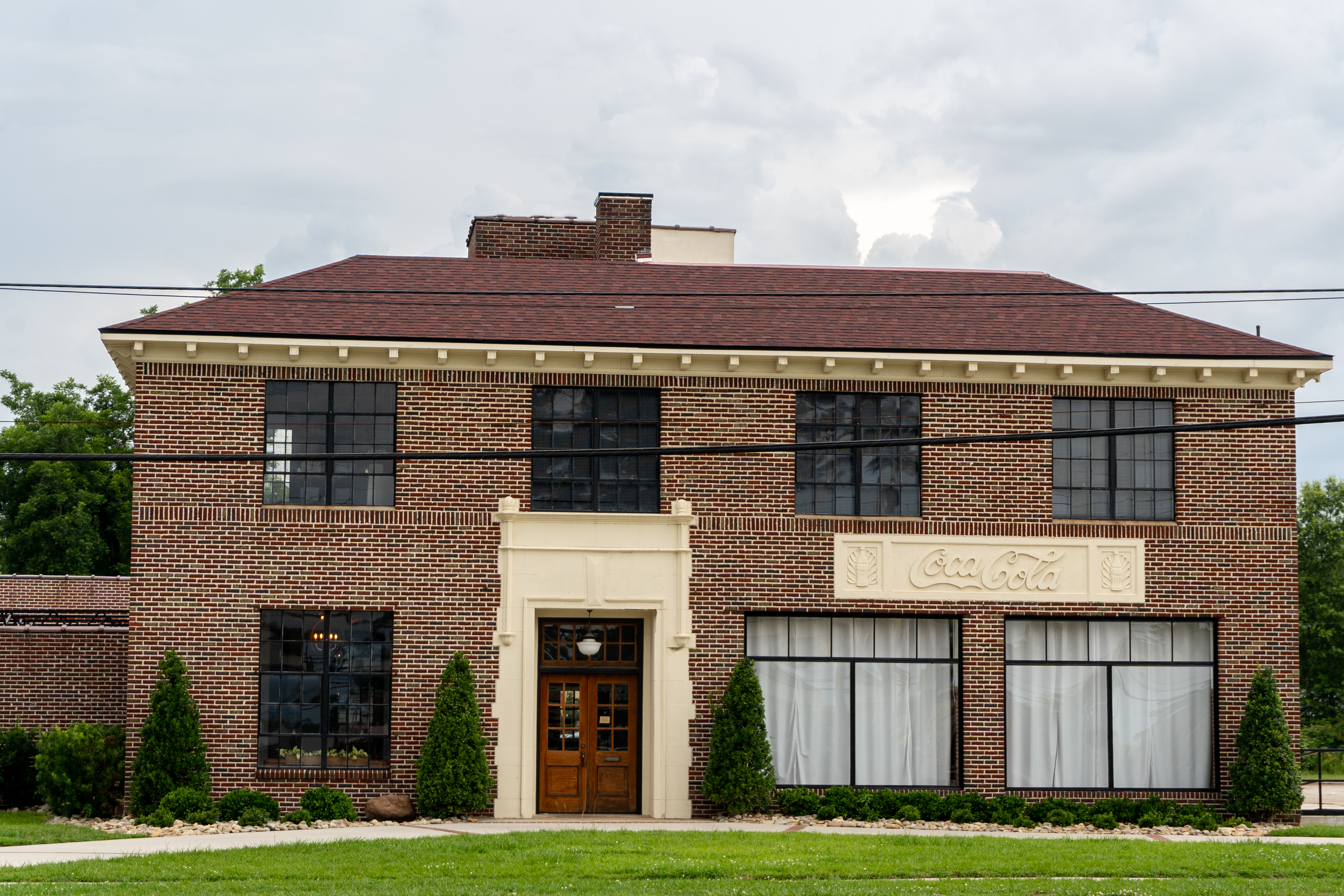

- Location within Louisiana Location within the United States
- Location: 213 Shenandoah Street, Bogalusa, Louisiana 70427
- Coordinates: 30°47′22″N 89°51′55″W
- Area: Bogalusa Historic Cultural District
- Built: c. 1930
- Built by: Dye & Mullings of Columbus, Mississippi
- Architect: Pringle & Smith of Atlanta
- Architectural style: Beaux-Arts
- NRHP reference No.: 100003379
- Added to NRHP: May 29, 2019

The Coca-Cola Bottling Plant is a former industrial plant in Bogalusa, Louisiana, for a bottling franchise of the Coca-Cola company. The National Register of Historic Places listed the building which now operates as an event venue named The Coke Plant.

== History ==
John Claude "J.C." Mills founded the Bogalusa Coca Cola Bottling Company in 1910 and built a two-story wood structure where the current brick building now stands. This building replaced that earlier structure in either 1930 or 1931. The facility bottled soda until 1985 when the Baton Rouge Coca-Cola Bottling Co. bought the company and closed the Bogalusa plant to consolidate operations.

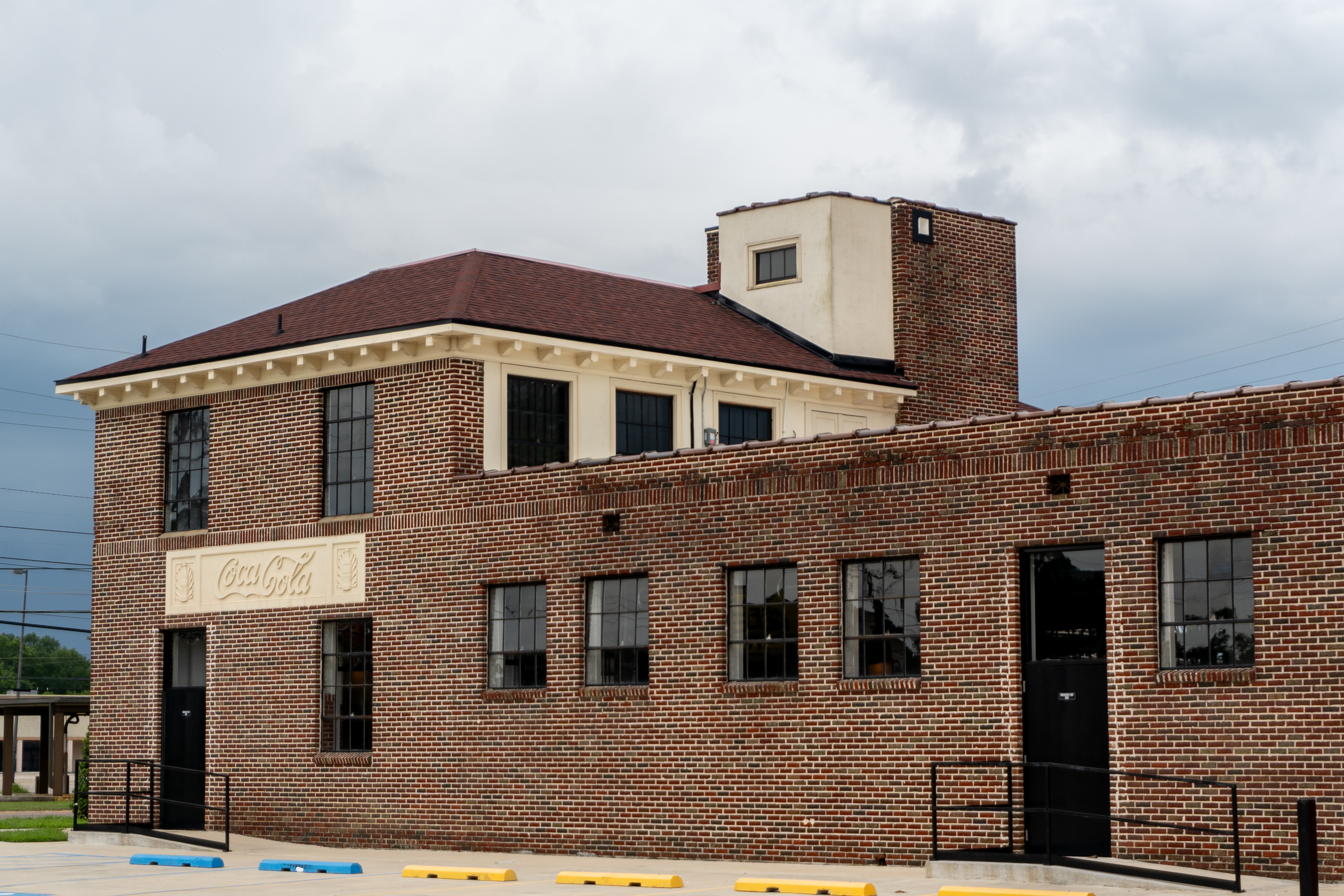
Side view of building

The building sat vacant for decades and experienced extensive water damage. In 2018, the Louisiana Trust for Historic Preservation identified the bottling plant as one of the most endangered historic sites in Louisiana. The next year, the National Register listed it as part of a preservation effort by the Bogalusa Historic Cultural District.

The Blackstone Property Company, owned by Bernie Brennan and James Brennan, purchased the building in 2020 with the intent to restore the structure, partly using historic rehab tax credits. That family had a long-term association with Coca-Cola as they started Brennan's Vend Works, which had been selling Coke products since its founding in 1950. After two years of renovations led by James Brennan, the building reopened in 2023 as "The Coke Plant", a wedding venue with a 500-person capacity.

== Architecture ==
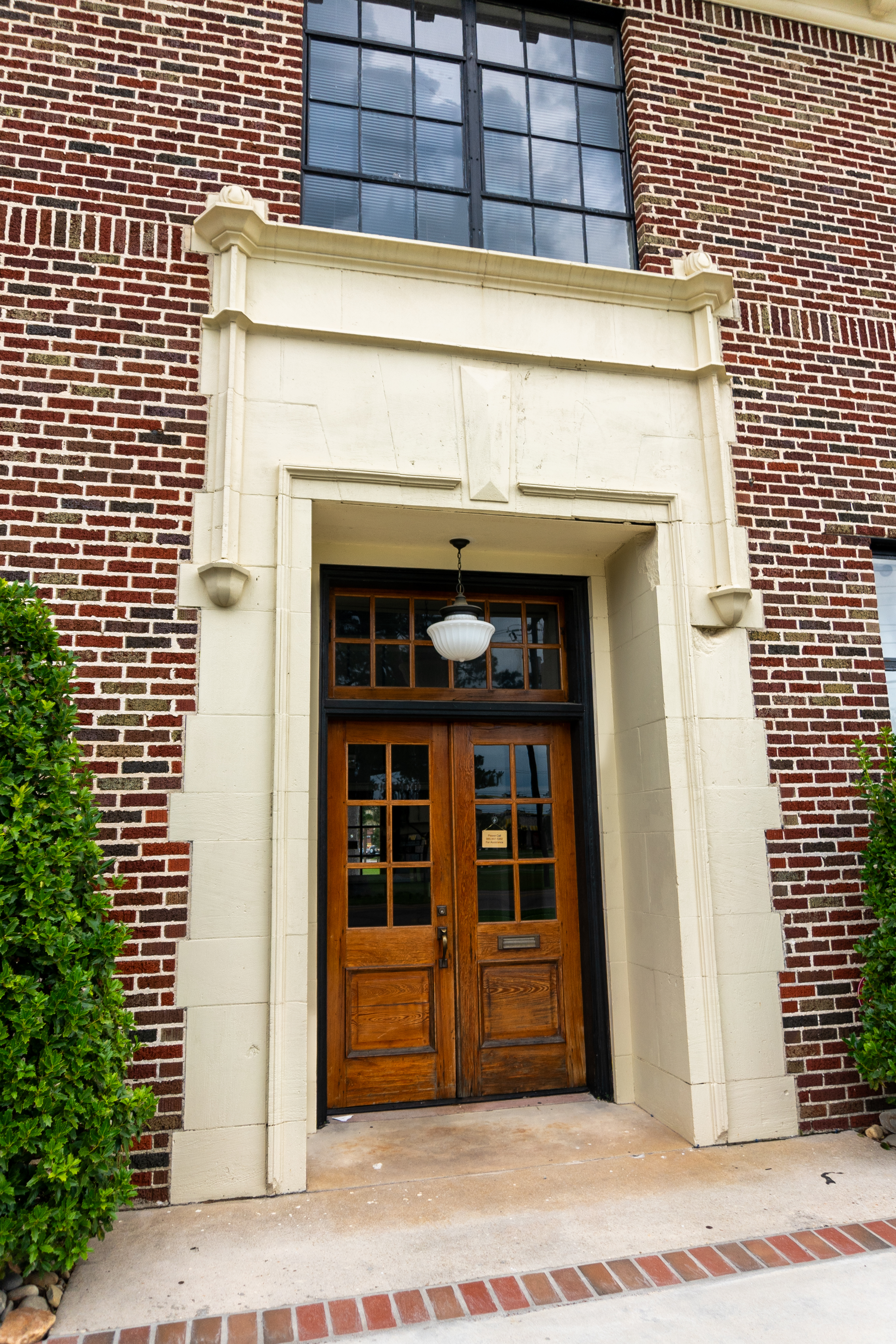
The front entrance with door surround

Coca-Cola hired the architecture firm Pringle & Smith to design standardized designs for their bottling franchises to use when constructing production facilities. These distinctive Beaux-Arts buildings extended Coca-Cola's recognizable branding to the physical landscape of towns. The Bogalusa building is the "Standard Plant No. 3" from the 1929 edition of the Coca-Cola Bottler’s Standards publication.

Both the front and two sides include prominent built-in terra cotta panels featuring the "Coca-Cola" logo and contoured Coke bottle motifs surrounded by honeysuckle leaves. Prior to the renovations, the logos were tinted red and the bottles green, but the panels are now a solid cream color.

The two-story front of the red brick building originally served as the offices and has a formal entrance with a concrete door surround. A hipped roof supported by plain modillions tops this section. The rear of the structure, where the bottling plant and garage were originally located, is just one story with a flat roof. The middle of the structure has a beam roof structure forming a covered central courtyard. Metal factory sash windows are used throughout the complex.

== See also ==
- List of Coca-Cola buildings and structures
- National Register of Historic Places listings in Washington Parish, Louisiana
