= Clifford House =

Clifford House may refer to:

- Clifford House (Eustis, Florida)
- Clifford House (Reno, Nevada)
- Clifford House, Toowoomba, a heritage-listed house in Queensland, Australia
