= Sylvest House =

Historic house in Louisiana, United States

- U.S. National Register of Historic Places
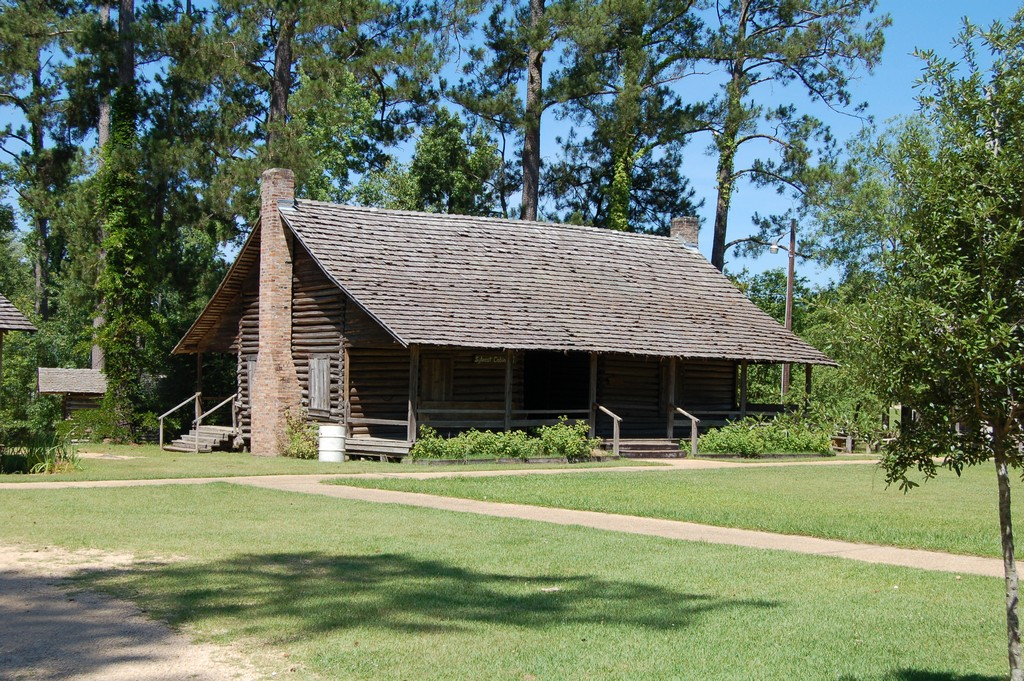

- Location within Louisiana Location within the United States
- Location: Washington Parish Fairgrounds, Franklinton, Louisiana
- Coordinates: 30.855°N 90.166111°W
- Area: less than one acre
- Built: c.1880
- NRHP reference No.: 79001099
- Added to NRHP: January 23, 1979

The Sylvest House on the Washington Parish Fairgrounds in Franklinton, Louisiana is a house that was built in c.1880. It was listed on the National Register of Historic Places in 1979.

It is a dog trot house which was built by Nehemiah Sylvest.

It was located in or near Fisher, Louisiana and was moved to a rural-like area in the Washington Parish Fairgrounds to be preserved.

== See also ==
- Knight Cabin: also on the fairgrounds
- National Register of Historic Places listings in Washington Parish, Louisiana
