= Robert D. Magee House =

- U.S. National Register of Historic Places
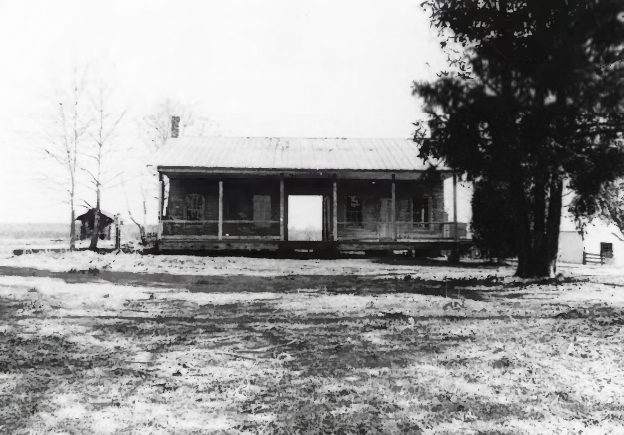

- Location within Louisiana
- Location: West of Angie off SR 438, Angie, Louisiana
- Built: Circa 1840 and 1860
- Architect: Unknown
- Architectural style: Dogtrot architecture
- NRHP reference No.: 82002801
- Added to NRHP: August 11, 1982

Robert D. Magee House is a historic house located near Angie, Washington Parish, Louisiana. Notable for its mid-19th-century construction, the house exemplifies the dogtrot architectural style.

Constructed in two stages around 1840 and 1860, this house is a key example of early architecture in the region. It underwent restoration in 1980 to maintain its historical integrity. The house's historical significance lies in its representation of the architectural styles and domestic life of the mid-19th century in Washington Parish.

== See also ==
- Nehemiah Magee House, also NRHP-listed in Washington Parish
- National Register of Historic Places listings in Washington Parish, Louisiana
