= Washington Parish Fairgrounds =

Fairgrounds in Louisiana

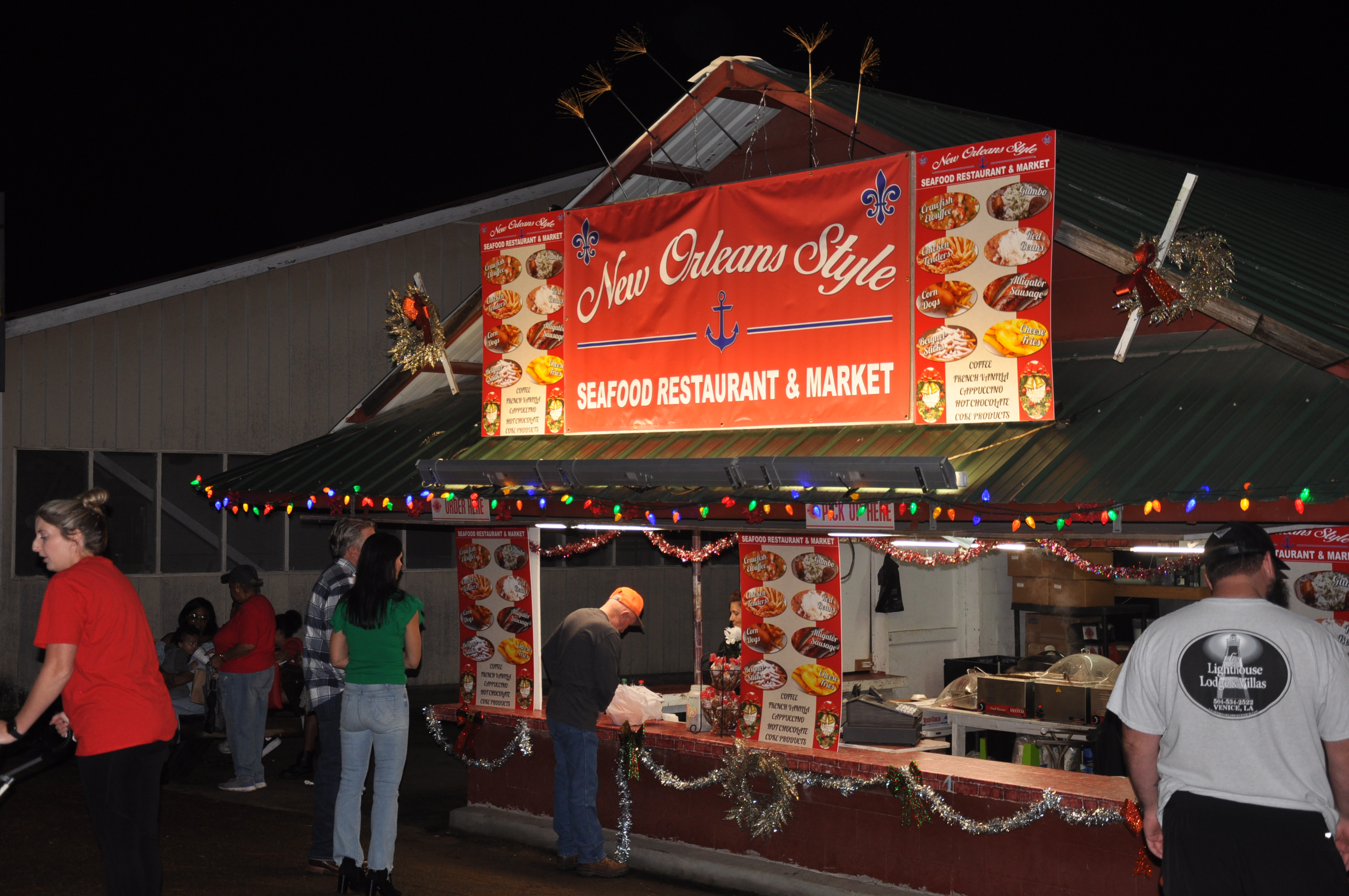
- Food vendor at Washington Parish Fair Grounds
- Interactive map of Washington Parish Fairgrounds
- Address: Main Street, Franklinton, Louisiana 70438
- Location: Franklinton, Louisiana, US
- Coordinates: 30.8565°N 90.1628°W
- Type: Fairgrounds

Construction
- Opened: 1911

Website
- thefreefair.com

Washington Parish Fairgrounds in Franklinton, Louisiana, is known for hosting the Washington Parish Free Fair. The fair, dating back to 1911, is believed to be the largest county/parish free fair in the US and the second oldest in Louisiana. The fairgrounds feature a variety of attractions, including the Mile Branch Settlement, a collection of historic buildings illustrating rural life.

== History ==
The first official Washington Parish Free Fair was held in 1911. The fairgrounds have served as the event's location since 1913. In 1976, the fairgrounds expanded to include structures typical of early homesteads in Washington Parish, moved here to save them from demolition. These include dogtrot houses, log cabins, barns, a shop, and a school, among others.

== Features ==
The fairgrounds host a variety of attractions, including exhibits of flowers, homemaking, livestock, and agricultural products, as well as Old McDonald's Farm, a Midway, and a PRO Rodeo. The Mile Branch Settlement, an Authentic Historical Pioneer Village, is a significant feature, offering visitors a glimpse into 19th-century pioneer life in Louisiana. Two of the buildings, Knight Cabin and the Sylvest House, are listed on the National Register of Historic Places.

== Events ==
The Washington Parish Free Fair, a family-oriented event, draws people from all over the country. It offers exhibits, a parade, a 5K run, and various stage activities, among other attractions.
