= Clifford's theorem =

Clifford's theorem may refer to:

- Clifford's theorem on special divisors
- Clifford theory in representation theory
- Hammersley–Clifford theorem in probability
- Clifford's circle theorems in Euclidean geometry
