= Knight Cabin =

- U.S. National Register of Historic Places
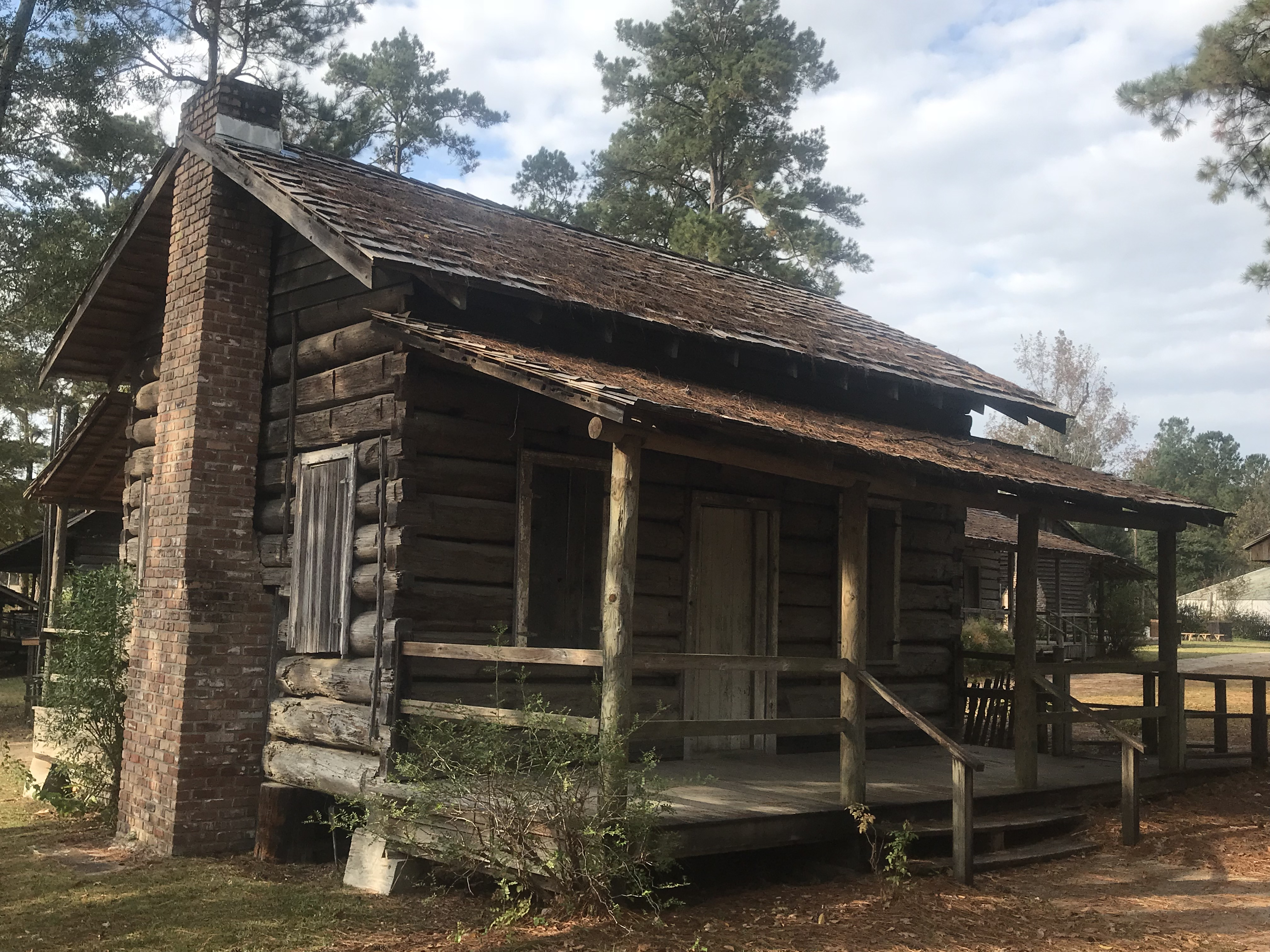

- Location within Louisiana
- Location: Washington Parish Fairgrounds, Franklinton, Louisiana
- Coordinates: 30°51′18″N 90°09′59″W
- Area: less than one acre
- Built: 1857
- NRHP reference No.: 79001098
- Added to NRHP: January 23, 1979

Knight Cabin, built in 1857 by George and Martha Knight, is a historic cabin located at the Washington Parish Fairgrounds in Franklinton, Louisiana. This single-room log cabin is an example of notch and pin construction, measuring 18 X 22 feet.

== History ==
The cabin, celebrated during the country's bicentennial in 1976, is listed in the National Register of Historic Places and the Louisiana Division of Historical Preservation. Its construction is typical of a pioneer family in rural Louisiana, featuring a single room with window shutters and a sleeping loft. The open design to the rafters allows more light into the usually dark environment.

The cabin's hand-hewn sills and simple frontier design provide insight into the architectural practices of the mid-19th century in rural Louisiana.

== See also ==
- Sylvest House: also on the fairgrounds
- National Register of Historic Places listings in Washington Parish, Louisiana
