= Alfred H. Clifford =

American mathematician (1908–1992)

- Born: July 8, 1908; St. Louis, Missouri
- Died: December 27, 1992 (aged 84); New Orleans, Louisiana
- Education: Yale University; California Institute of Technology
- Known for: Clifford theory
- Scientific career
- Fields: Group theory, semigroup theory
- Workplaces: Institute for Advanced Study; Massachusetts Institute of Technology; Johns Hopkins University; Tulane University
- Thesis: Arithmetic of Ova (1933)
- Doctoral advisor: Eric Temple Bell, Morgan Ward

Alfred Hoblitzelle Clifford (July 11, 1908 – December 27, 1992) was an American mathematician born in St. Louis, Missouri who is known for Clifford theory and for his work on semigroups. He did his undergraduate studies at Yale and his PhD at Caltech, and worked at MIT, Johns Hopkins (as Associate Professor), and later, in 1955, Tulane University (as Professor of Mathematics and Head of Sophie Newcomb College).

The Alfred H. Clifford Mathematics Research Library at Tulane University is named after him.

== Publications ==
- Clifford, A. H. (1937), Representations Induced in an Invariant Subgroup, Annals of Mathematics, 2nd series, 38(3): 533–550, doi:10.2307/1968599, JSTOR 1968599, PMC 1076873, PMID 16588132
- George W. Mackie (1976), Theory of Unitary Group Representations, Chicago Mathematics Lecture, ISBN 0-226-50051-9
- Clifford, Alfred Hoblitzelle; Preston, Gordon B. (1961), The algebraic theory of semigroups. Vol. I, Mathematical Surveys, No. 7, Providence, R.I.: American Mathematical Society, ISBN 978-0-8218-0272-4, MR 0132791
- Clifford, Alfred Hoblitzelle; Preston, Gordon B. (1967), The algebraic theory of semigroups. Vol. 2, American Mathematical Society
- Clifford, Alfred. H. (1974), The Partial Groupoid of Idempotents of a Regular Semigroup, Tulane University, Department of Mathematics.
- Clifford, Alfred. H. (1974), The Fundamental Representation of a Regular Semigroup, Tulane University, Department of Mathematics.
- Clifford, Alfred. H. (1976), The Free Completely Regular Semigroup as a Set, Tulane Universite, Department of Mathematics.
- Clifford, Alfred Hoblitzelle; Edited by Hofmann, Karl H. & Mislove, Michael W. (1996), Semigroup Theory and its Applications: Proceedings of the 1994 Conference Commemorating the Work of Alfried H. Clifford. Cambridge University Press, ISBN 978-0-521576697
