= Nehemiah Magee House =

- U.S. National Register of Historic Places
- Location within Louisiana
- Nearest city: Mt. Hermon, Louisiana
- Coordinates: 30°56′35″N 90°19′53″W
- Area: 0.3 acres (0.12 ha)
- Built: 1810
- NRHP reference No.: 82002802
- Added to NRHP: August 12, 1982

Nehemiah Magee House, located southwest of Mt. Hermon, Louisiana, is a historic house built around 1810 and expanded in the mid-19th century. Initially, as one-room log cabin, it evolved into a large farmhouse and is one of the few remaining log structures of its age in the region.

The house is significant as the home of Nehemiah Magee, a prominent local politician and participant in the 1861 Louisiana secession convention. It has remained in the Magee family, retaining historical features despite alterations. The house's evolution from a simple log cabin to a larger farmhouse showcases the architectural development in the area during the early 19th century.

== See also ==
- Robert D. Magee House, also NRHP-listed in Washington Parish
- National Register of Historic Places listings in Washington Parish, Louisiana
