= Robert H. Babington House =

- U.S. National Register of Historic Places
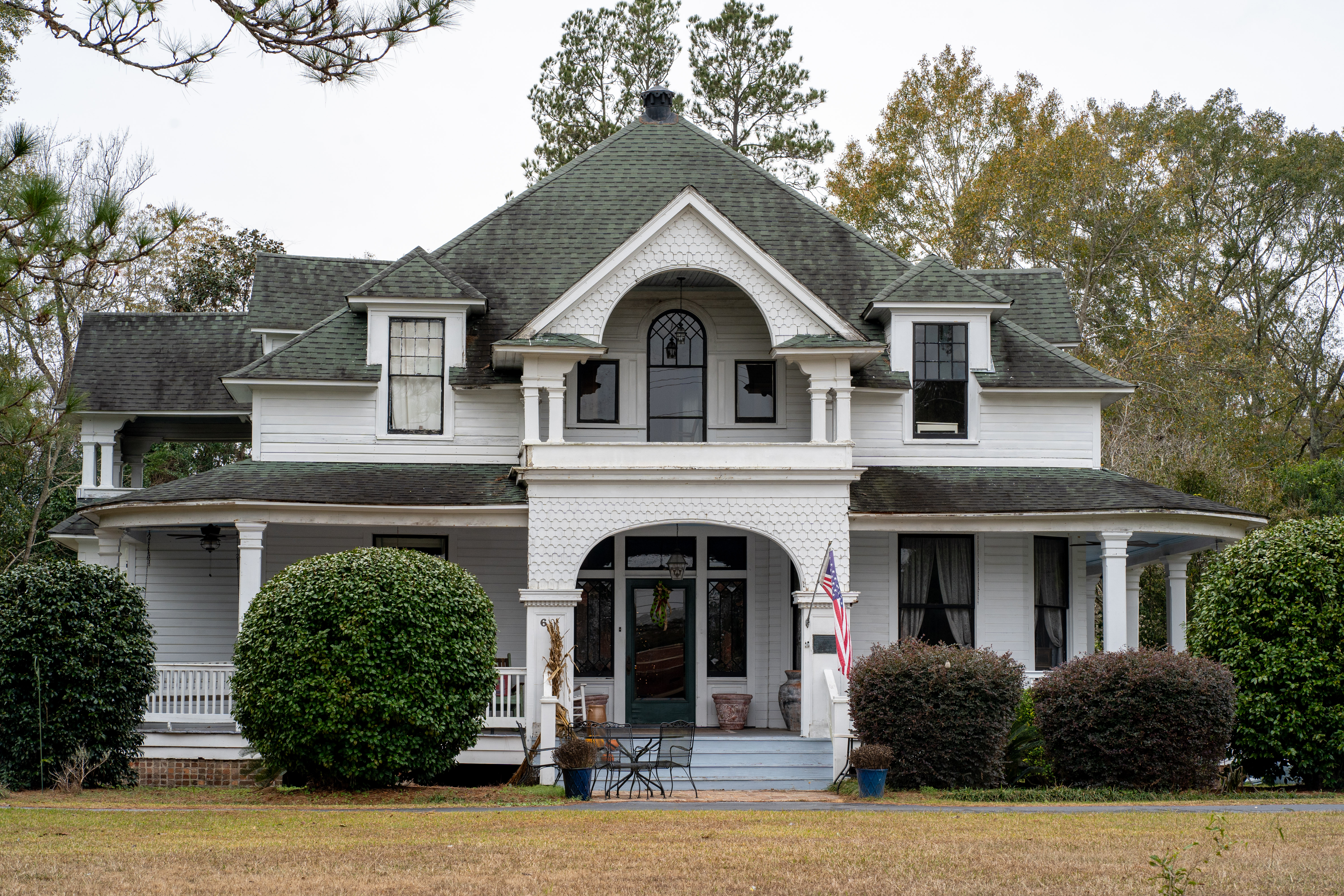

- Location within Louisiana
- Location: 608 Main St., Franklinton, Louisiana
- Coordinates: 30°50′55″N 90°09′27″W
- Area: 1.5 acres (0.61 ha)
- Built: 1906
- Architect: Weathers, P.H.
- Architectural style: Colonial Revival, Queen Anne
- NRHP reference No.: 79001097
- Added to NRHP: December 6, 1979

Robert H. Babington House is a historic house located in Franklinton, Washington Parish, Louisiana. Designed by P.H. Weathers and built in 1906, it is a notable example of the Queen Anne and Colonial Revival styles.

== History ==
The house reflects the architectural development of the early 20th century in Louisiana. It is associated with the Babington family, known for their contributions to local commerce.

== Architecture ==
Combining Queen Anne and Colonial Revival styles, the house is a significant example of early 20th-century architecture. It is particularly noted for its well-preserved original wallpaper, adding to its artistic value.

== See also ==
- Thomas M. Babington House, also NRHP-listed in Franklinton
- National Register of Historic Places listings in Washington Parish, Louisiana
