= Thomas M. Babington House =

Historic house in Louisiana, United States

- U.S. National Register of Historic Places
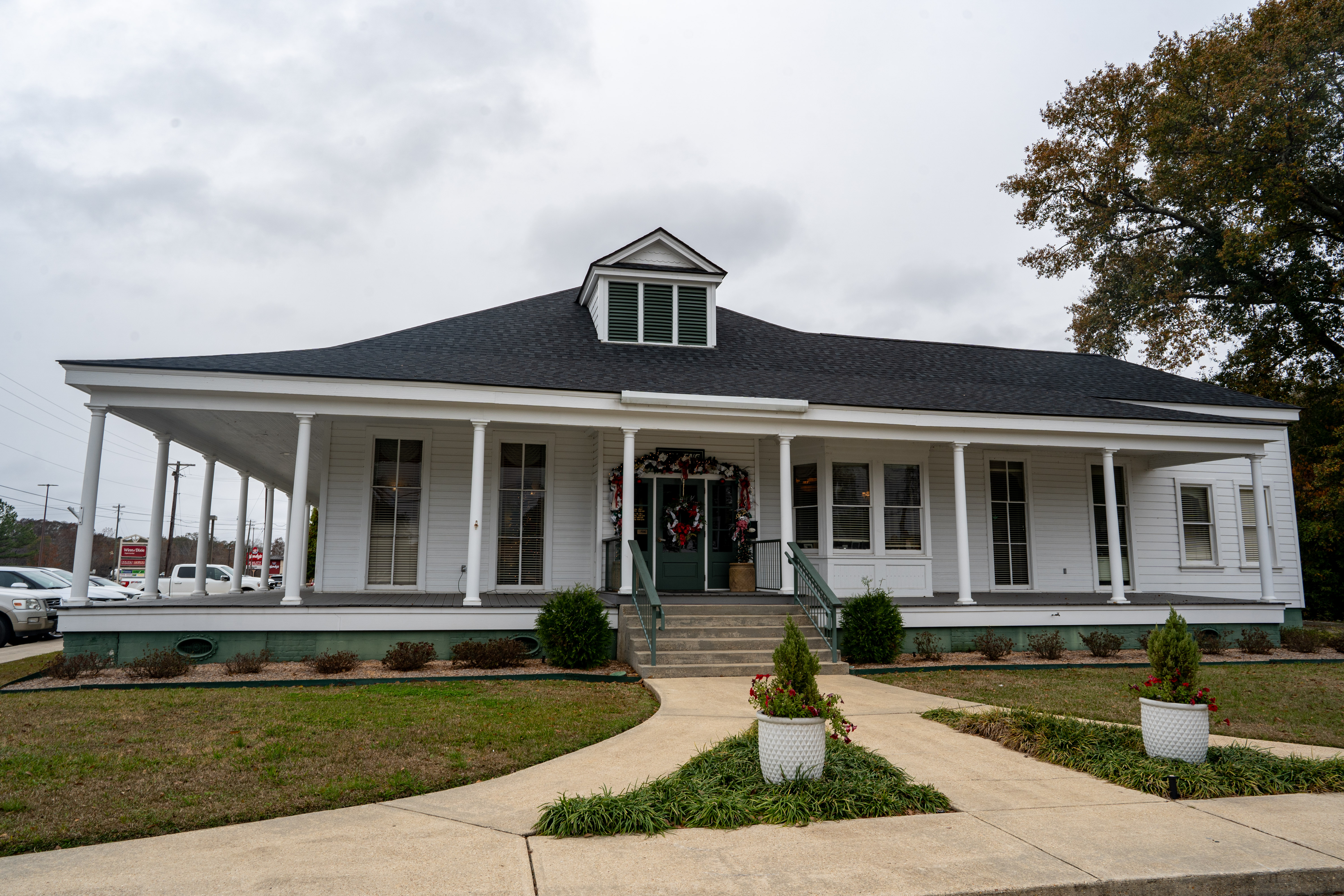

- Location within Louisiana Location within the United States
- Location: 828 Main St., Franklinton, Louisiana
- Coordinates: 30.845833°N 90.157778°W
- Area: 1 acre (0.40 ha)
- Architect: Paquet, Peter
- Architectural style: Colonial Revival
- NRHP reference No.: 95000899
- Added to NRHP: July 21, 1995

The Thomas M. Babington House is a historic house located in Franklinton, Washington Parish, Louisiana built around 1900. It is a one-story vernacular Colonial Revival building which has some Queen Anne details. Colonial Revival details include its Tuscan gallery columns. It was used for a number of years as a hospital and then as a medical clinic.

The house was home of Thomas Babington, one of four Babington brothers important in Franklinton history for their efforts, eventually successful, to secure a railway to be built into the town.

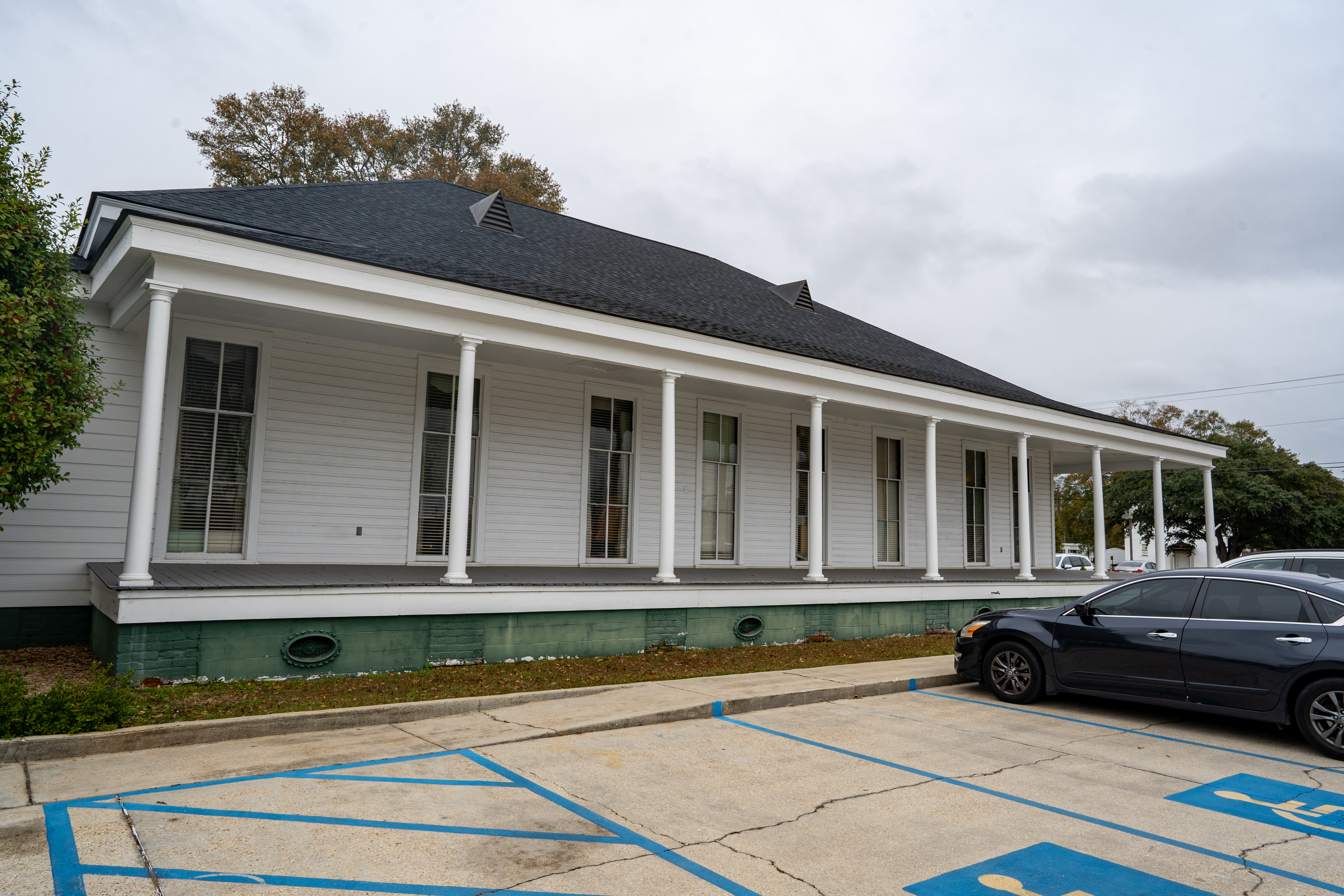

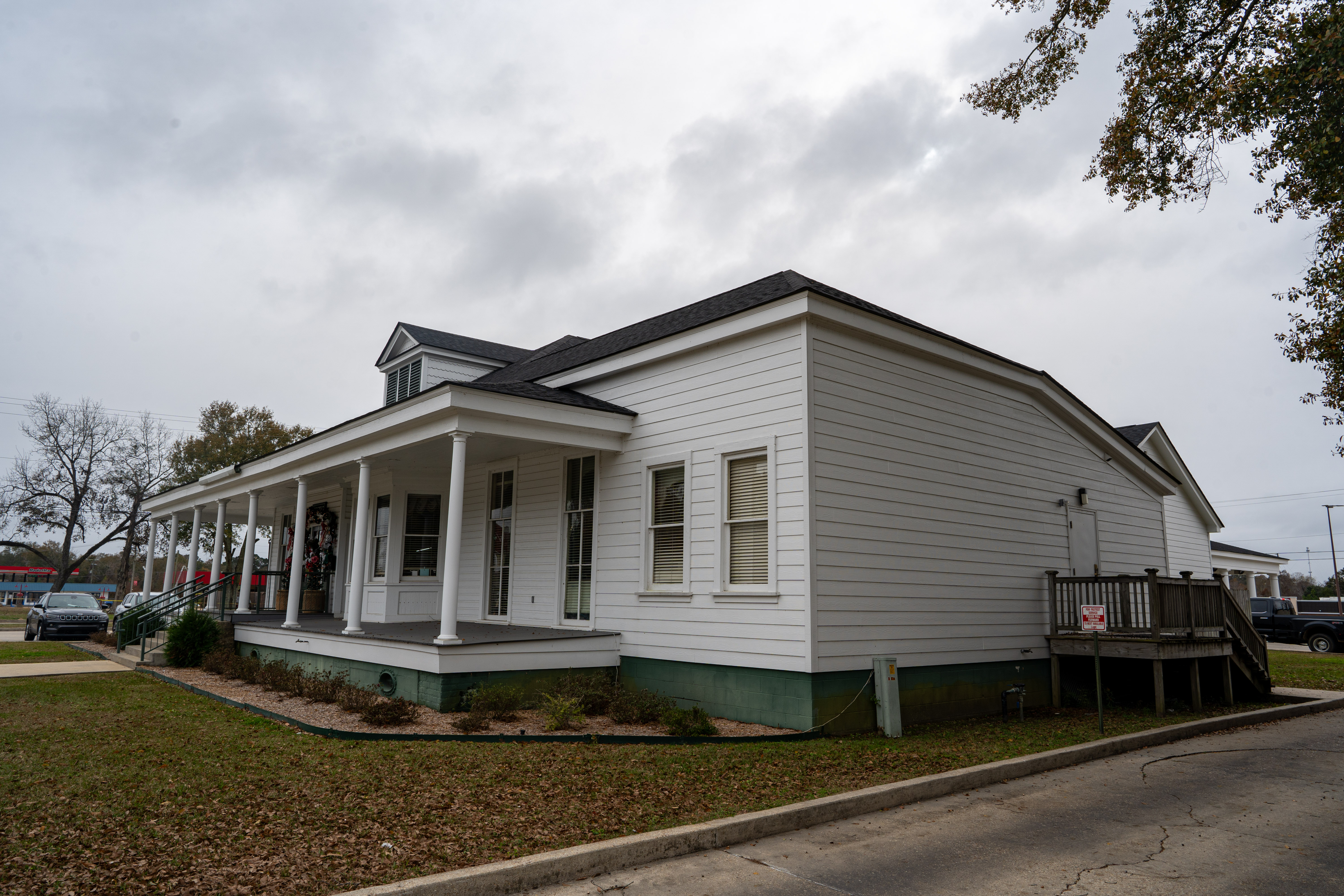

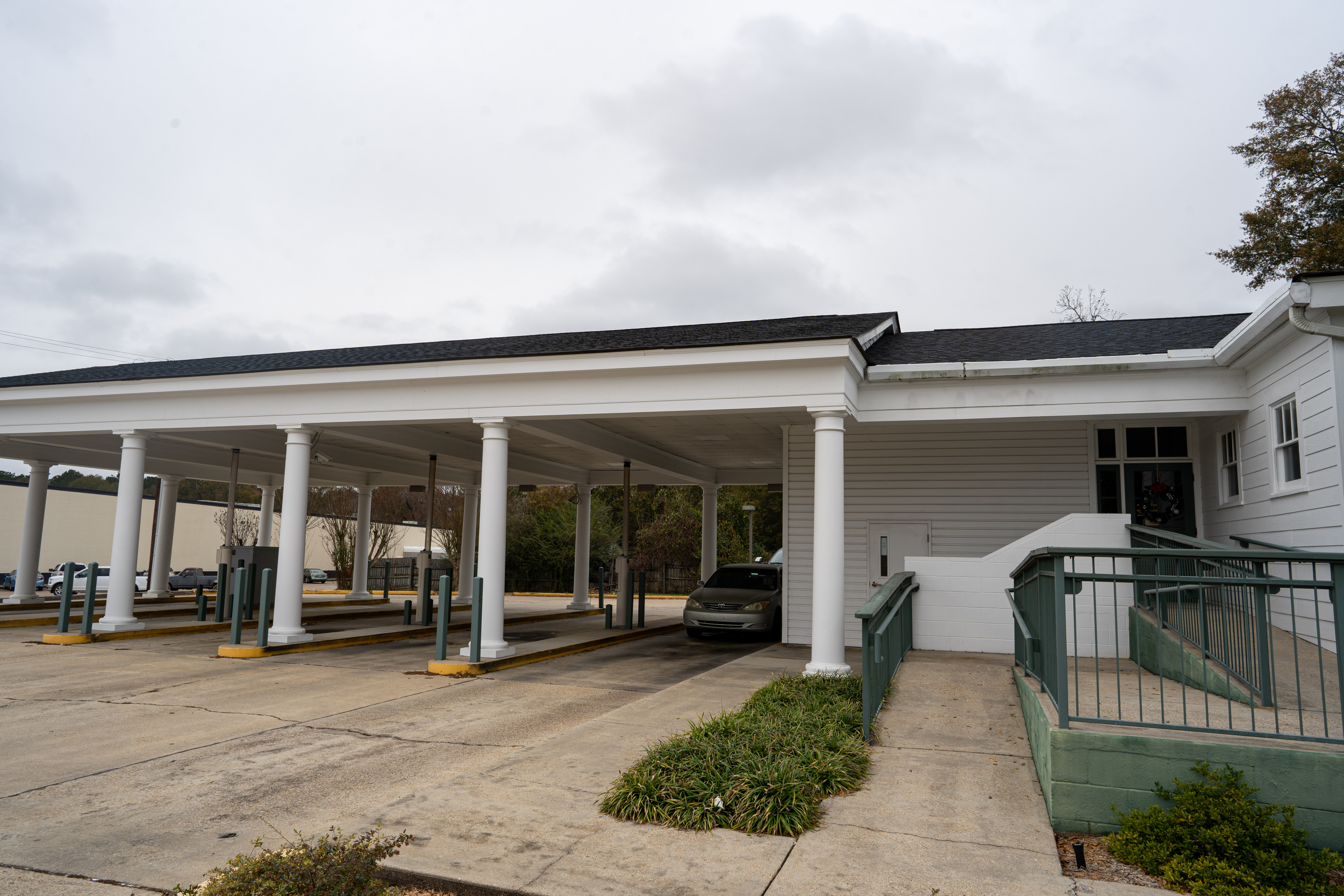
Alternate Sides

== See also ==
- Robert H. Babington House, also NRHP-listed in Franklinton
- National Register of Historic Places listings in Washington Parish, Louisiana
