= H. Warren House =

Historic house in Massachusetts, United States

- U.S. National Register of Historic Places
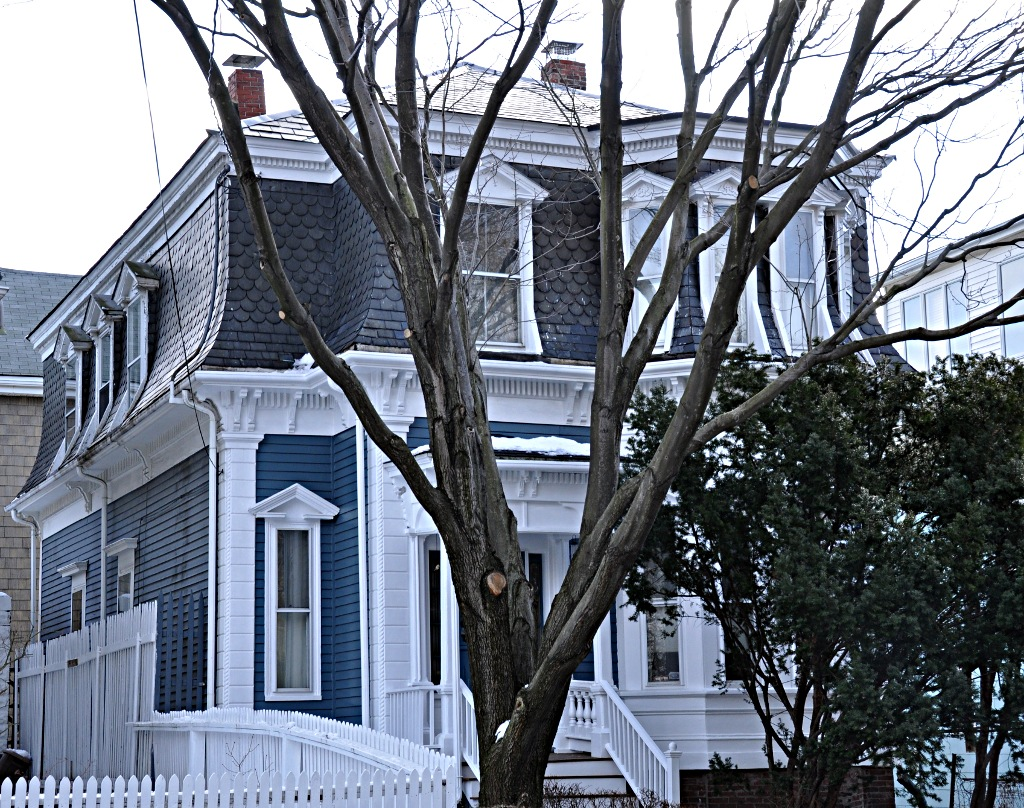

- Location within Massachusetts Location within the United States
- Location: 205 School Street, Somerville, Massachusetts
- Coordinates: 42°23′25″N 71°5′47″W
- Built: 1870
- Architectural style: Second Empire
- MPS: Somerville MPS
- NRHP reference No.: 89001283
- Added to NRHP: September 18, 1989

The H. Warren House is a historic house in Somerville, Massachusetts. The two story wood-frame house was built c. 1870, probably by J. K. Moore, a local cabinet maker. It is one of the finest Second Empire structures in the Winter Hill area of the city. The mansard roof is pierced by numerous gabled and pedimented dormers, the cornice is lined with dentil molding and studded with brackets, and the house corners have quoins designed to resemble stonework.

The house was listed on the National Register of Historic Places in 1989.

== See also ==
- National Register of Historic Places listings in Somerville, Massachusetts
