= D.A. Varnado and Son Store =

- U.S. National Register of Historic Places
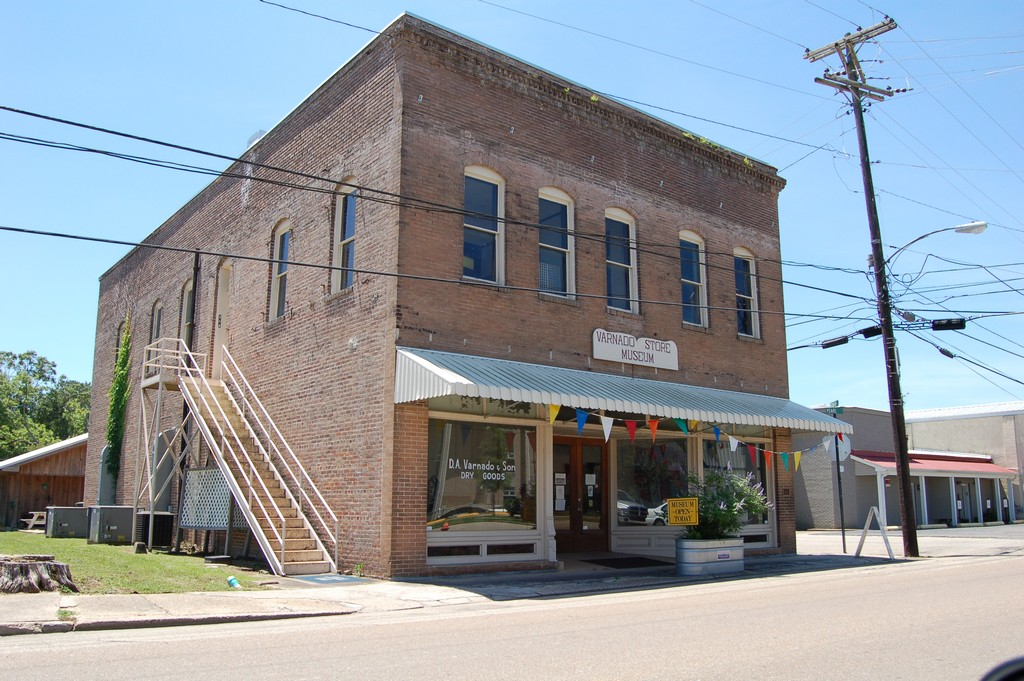

- Location within Louisiana Location within the United States
- Location: 936 Pearl St., Franklinton, Louisiana
- Coordinates: 30.843889°N 90.154167°W
- Area: less than one acre
- Built: c.1900, 1925
- Architectural style: Italianate
- NRHP reference No.: 01000763
- Added to NRHP: July 25, 2001

The D.A. Varnado and Son Store in Franklinton, Louisiana is an Italianate-style building constructed in c.1900. It was listed on the National Register of Historic Places in July 2001.

It was deemed to be "locally significant in the area of architecture because it is a rare and well preserved historic commercial building with period shopfront and interior."

It is a two-story brick commercial building. It originally had a second-story gallery wrapping around three sides of the building; this was removed in a 1925 renovation and replaced by a metal awning.

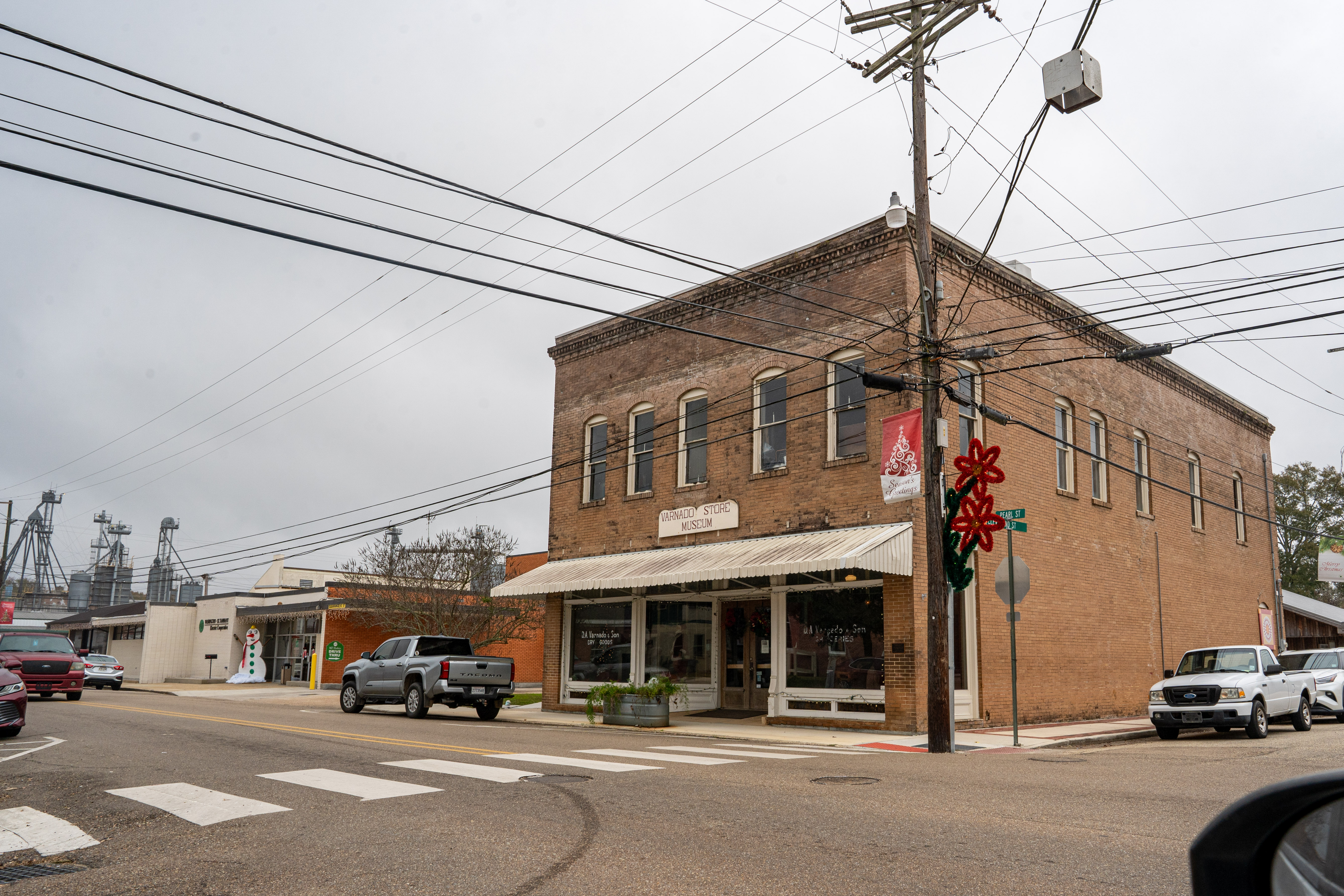
