= Louisiana Trust for Historic Preservation =

Louisiana Trust for Historic Preservation (LYHP) is an organization that advocates for the preservation of historic buildings in Louisiana. It was established in 1979.

It compiled a database of cemeteries and has sought information on lost cemeteries. In 2025 it received the Trustees’ Award for Organizational Excellence from the National Trust for Historic Preservation.

The group releases an annual list of vulnerable historic sites in Louisiana.

Louisiana Trust for Historic Preservation has a YouTube channel. It presents award to preservationists.

== See also ==
- National Register of Historic Places listings in Louisiana
