= Justice Clifford (disambiguation) =

Justice Clifford refers to Nathan Clifford (1803–1881), associate justice of the United States Supreme Court. Justice Clifford may also refer to:

- Robert L. Clifford (1924–2014), associate justice of the New Jersey Supreme Court
- Robert W. Clifford (born 1937), associate justice of the Maine Supreme Judicial Court
