= Brumfield Homestead =

- U.S. National Register of Historic Places
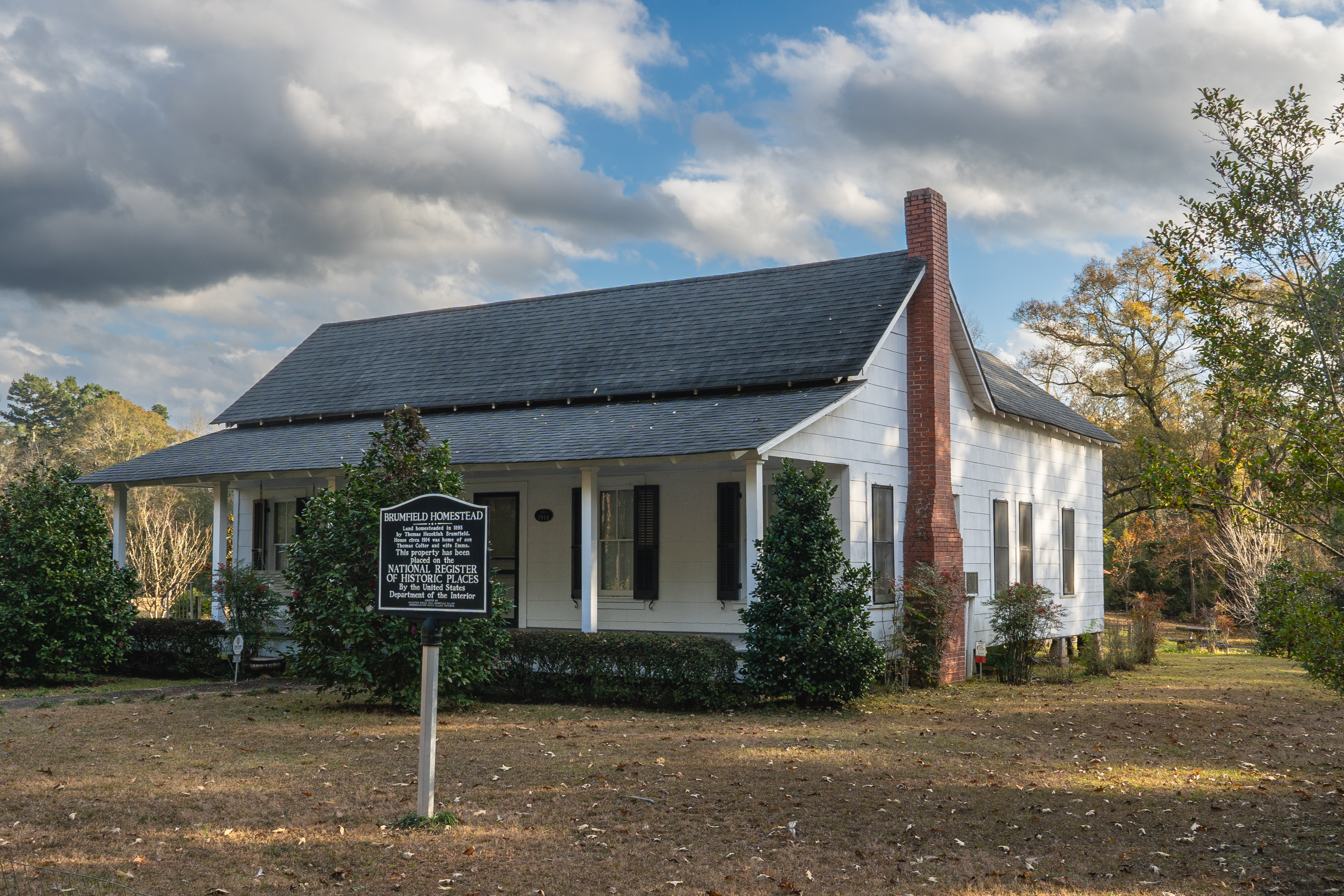

- Location within Louisiana
- Location: 47082 T.C. Brumfield Rd., Franklinton, Louisiana
- Built: Circa 1888
- NRHP reference No.: 14000693
- Added to NRHP: September 24, 2014

Brumfield Homestead is a historic farmstead located near Franklinton, Washington Parish, Louisiana. Established in the late 19th century, it remains an intact example of a rural farmstead in the region, showcasing local agricultural practices and vernacular architecture.

The homestead, established by Thomas Hezekiah Brumfield in 1887, features buildings constructed between 1887 and 1975, including a farmhouse and several outbuildings. The Brumfield Homestead includes a farmhouse, smokehouse, combination barn, corn crib, chicken house, livestock barn, cotton house, and pump house, all exemplifying rural architectural styles of the period.

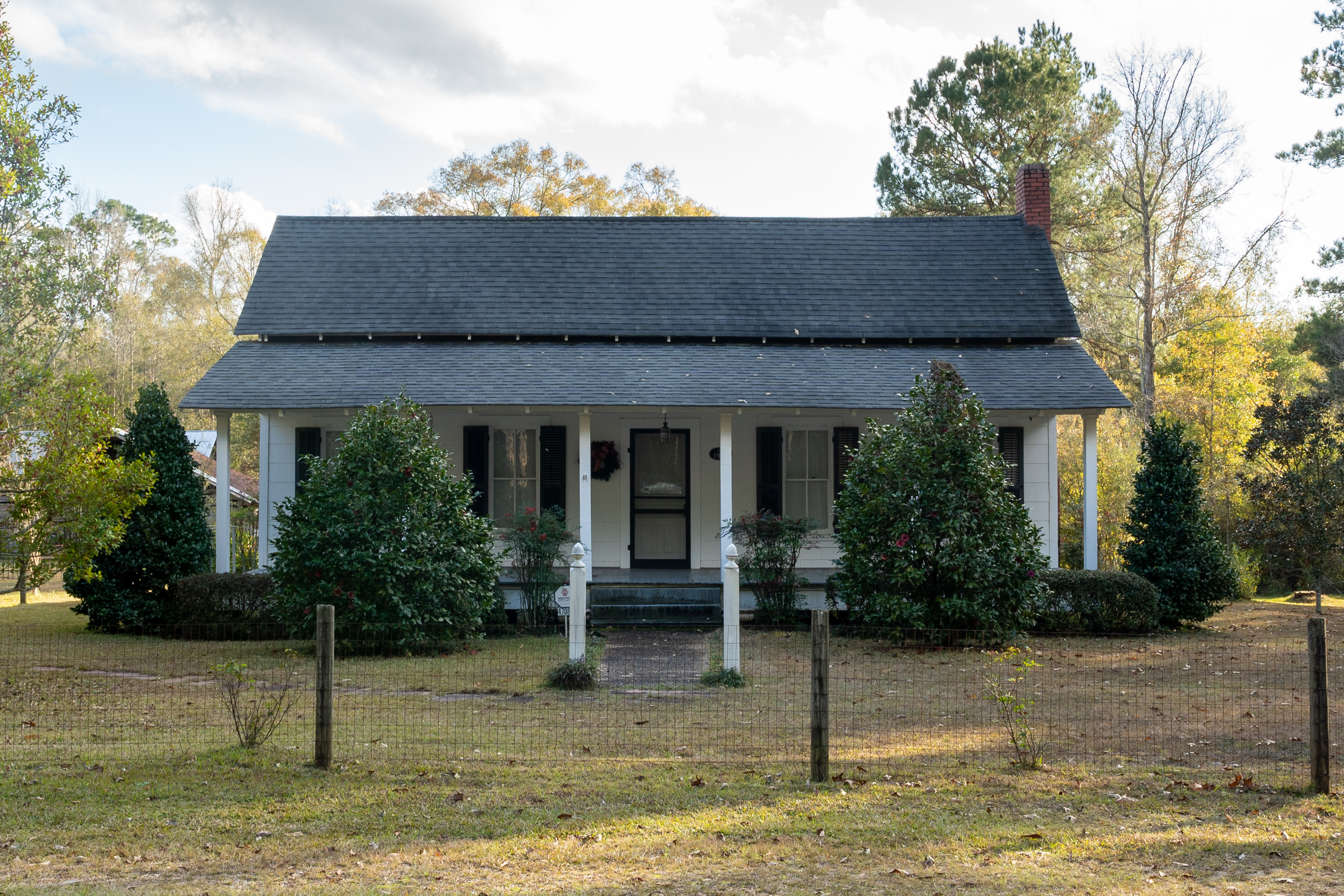
Front View of Home

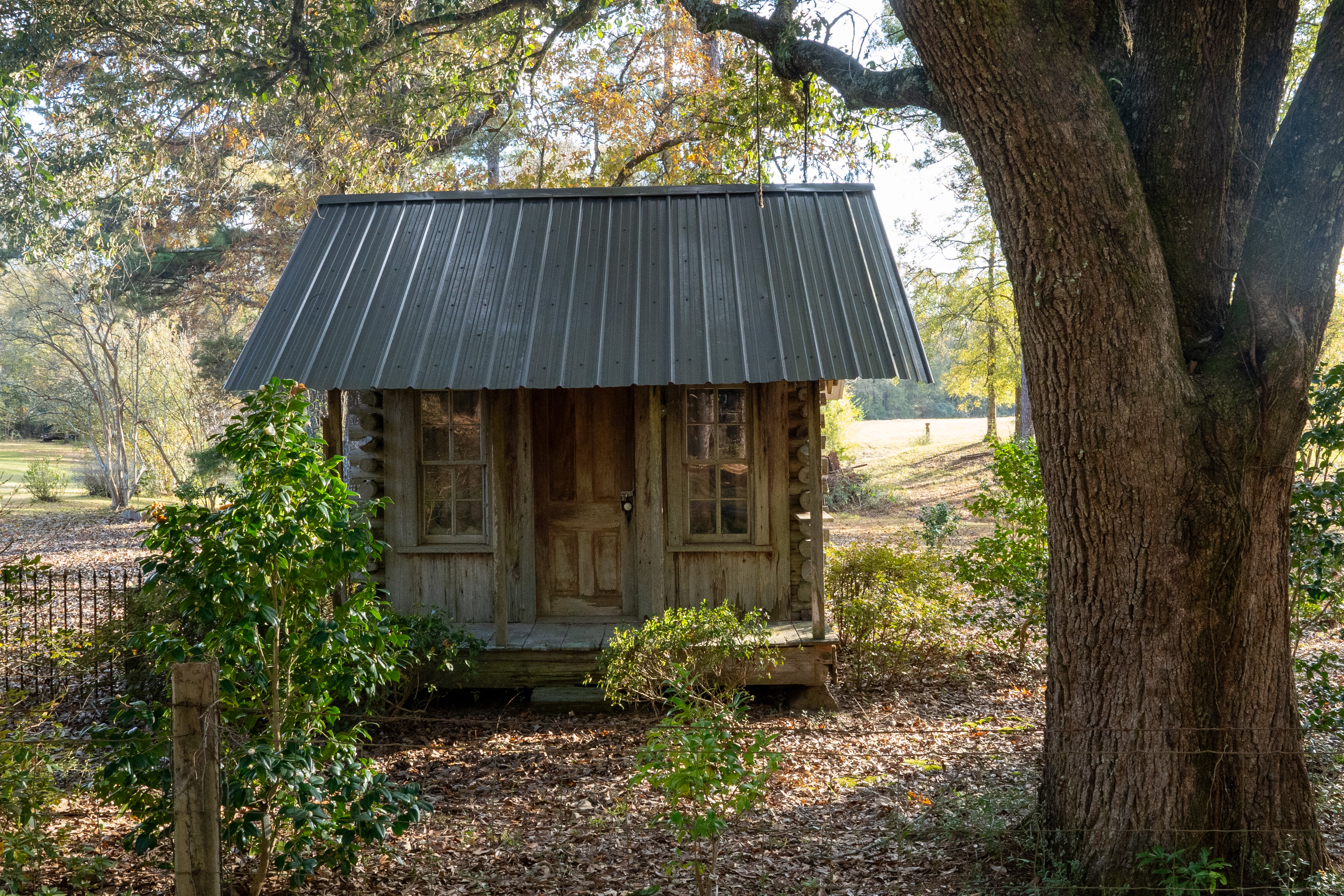
Outbuilding
