= Bogalusa Post Office =

- US Post Office
- U.S. National Register of Historic Places
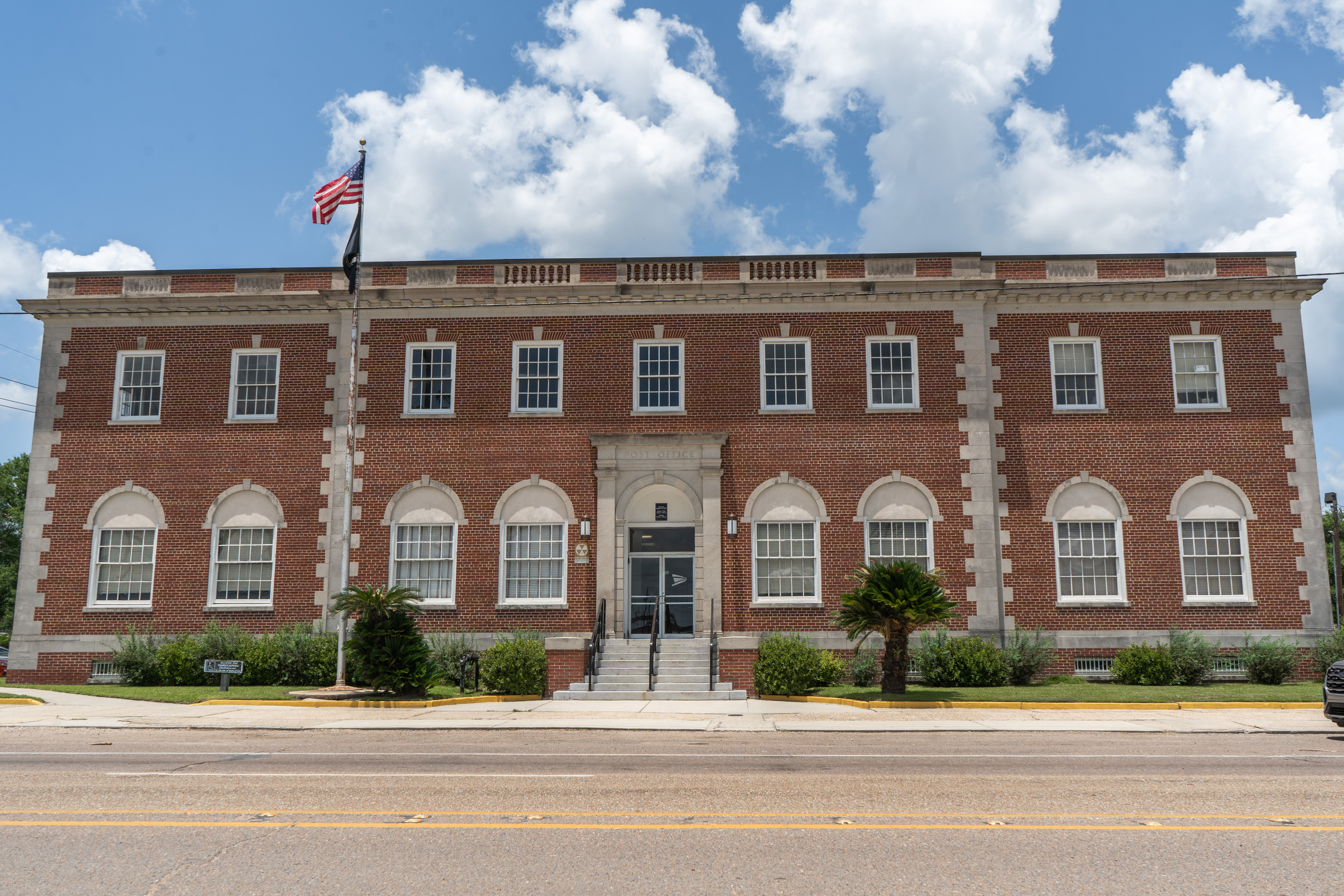

- Location within Louisiana Location within the United States
- Location: 305 Avenue B, Bogalusa, Louisiana
- Coordinates: 30.778611°N 89.866667°W
- Area: 0.7 acres (0.28 ha)
- Built: 1930-31
- Architect: Office of the Supervising Architect under James A. Wetmore
- Architectural style: Colonial Revival, Neo-Georgian Revival
- NRHP reference No.: 83000552
- Added to NRHP: January 27, 1983

The Bogalusa Post Office, also known as U.S. Post Office, in Bogalusa in Washington Parish, Louisiana, was designed in 1930 and completed in 1931 under supervision of Office of the Supervising Architect under James A. Wetmore. It was listed on the National Register of Historic Places in 1983.

It is neo-Georgian in style and is notable as one of few surviving monumental buildings in Bogalusa, after historic structures relating to the lumbering Goodyear Company have been lost. It is a two-story brick building with basement. It was remodeled and extended in 1962 by the General Services Administration.
