= Lord Clifford =

Lord Clifford may refer to:

- Baron Clifford
- Baron Clifford of Chudleigh
- Baron de Clifford
