= Greenlaw House =

Historic house in Louisiana, United States

- U.S. National Register of Historic Places
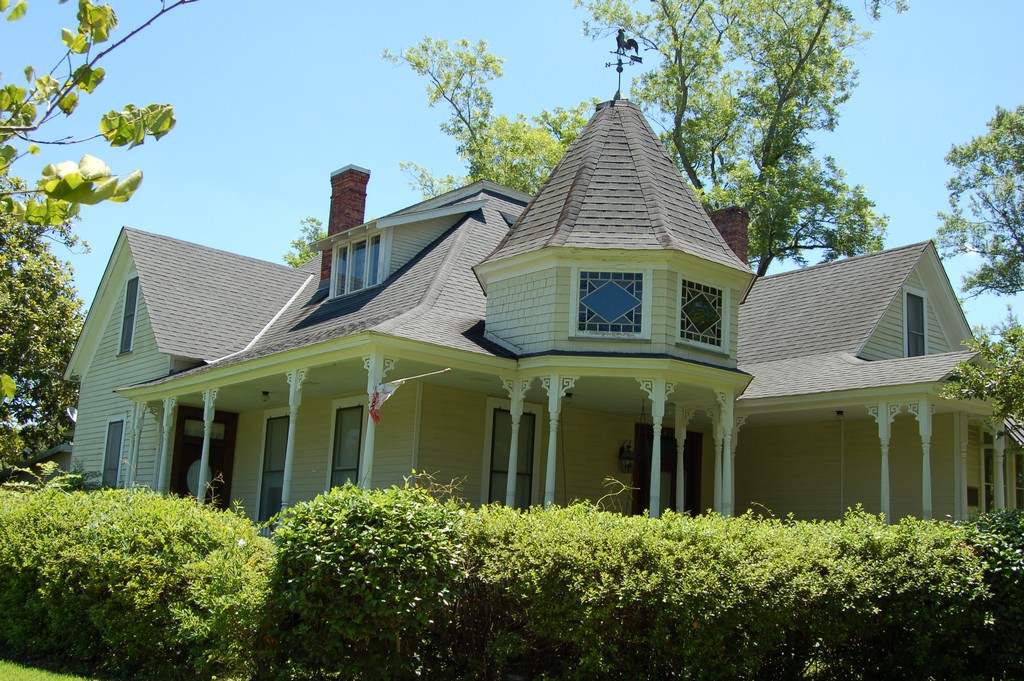

- Location within Louisiana Location within the United States
- Location: 613 10th Ave., Franklinton, Louisiana
- Coordinates: 30°51′0″N 90°9′26″W
- Area: 0.5 acres (0.20 ha)
- Built: 1906
- Architectural style: Queen Anne, Stick/eastlake
- NRHP reference No.: 98000987
- Added to NRHP: August 6, 1998

The Greenlaw House in Franklinton in Washington Parish, Louisiana was built in 1906. It was listed on the National Register of Historic Places in 1998.

It is a one-and-a-half-story Queen Anne-style house with characteristic massing and textures. It has a turret and a wraparound gallery with bracketed Eastlake-style columns.

Edward Runnels Greenlaw, a businessman in sawmills and railroads, had the house built for his parents, Civil War veteran Captain Lawrence Dade Greenlaw and Dora Runnels Greenlaw, a poet.

The Greenlaw House has been rumored to be haunted which is a shared belief amongst a few previous residents.
