= Clifford, Missouri =

Extinct hamlet in Missouri, U.S.

Coordinates: 37.7328154°N 93.2096362°W

Clifford is an extinct town in Polk County, in the U.S. state of Missouri.

A post office called Clifford was established in 1904, and remained in operation until 1914. According to tradition, a local merchant gave the community the name of his son.
