= Bogalusa City Hall =

- U.S. National Register of Historic Places
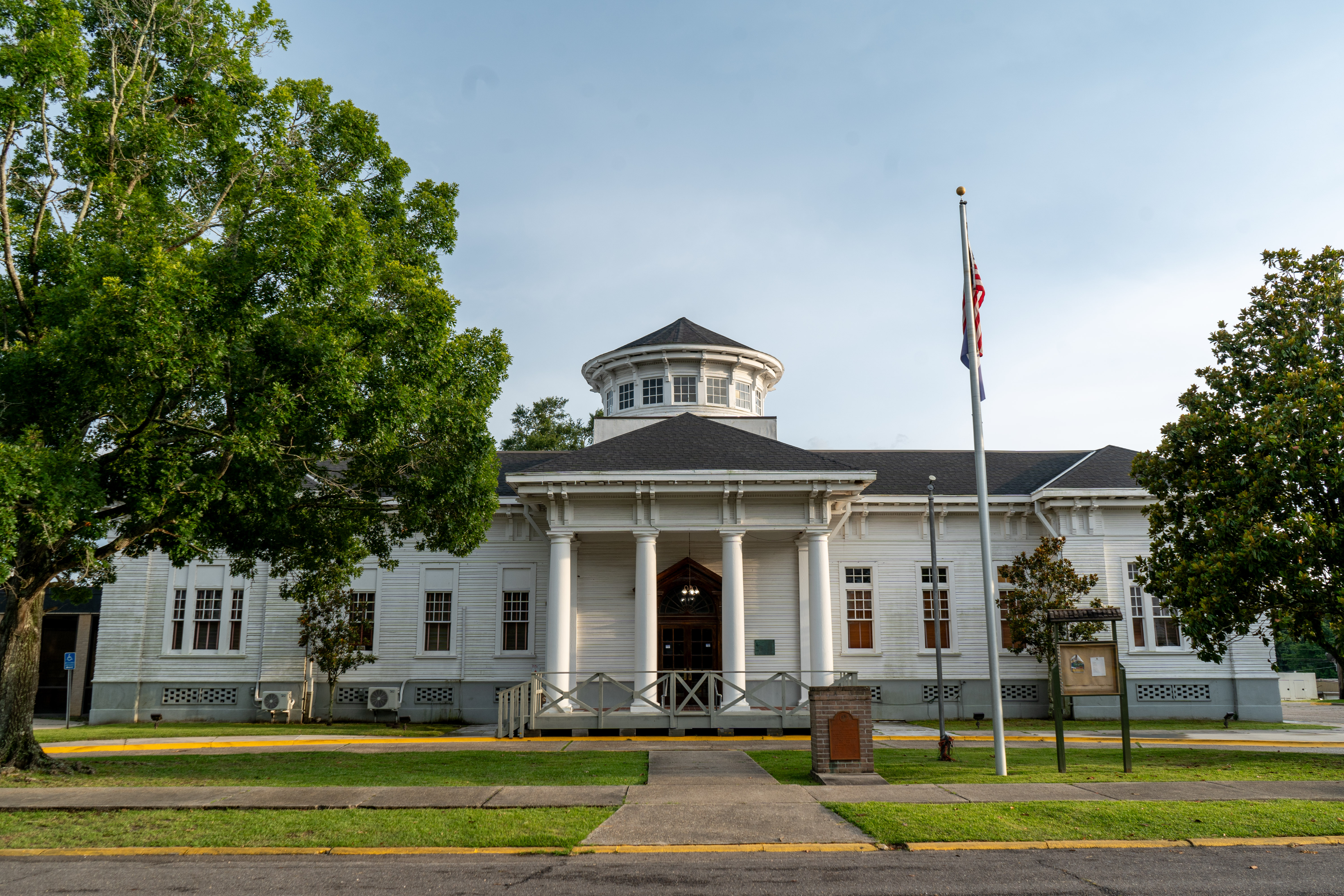

- Location within Louisiana Location within the United States
- Location: 214 Arkans Hall Ave., Bogalusa, Louisiana
- Coordinates: 30°47′9″N 89°51′36″W
- Area: 0.5 acres (0.20 ha)
- Built: 1917
- Built by: E. N. Moore
- Architect: Rathbone Debuys
- Architectural style: Late 19th And 20th Century Revivals, Classical Revival
- NRHP reference No.: 79001095
- Added to NRHP: July 26, 1979

The Bogalusa City Hall, in Bogalusa in Washington Parish, Louisiana, was built in 1917. It was listed on the National Register of Historic Places in 1979.

It has a four-column Tuscan-style portico. It was designed by New Orleans architect Rathbone Debuys and built by contractor E. N. Moore.

It was deemed notable as "a handsome example of an early twentieth century town hall of the then predominant Classical mode. The elegant Renaissance Revival building, with its five-part composition, and axial, almost Palladian plan, represents a greater degree of high style sophistication than is achieved in any other building in Bogalusa, or most other town halls in southeastern Louisiana. The City Hall's significance in the area of politics/government rests upon its status as the seat of municipal government since 1917."

Bogalusa became a city in 1914; before this building was constructed its City Council met in the offices of the Great Southern Lumber Company.
