= Sullivan House (Bogalusa, Louisiana) =

Historic house in Louisiana, United States

- U.S. National Register of Historic Places
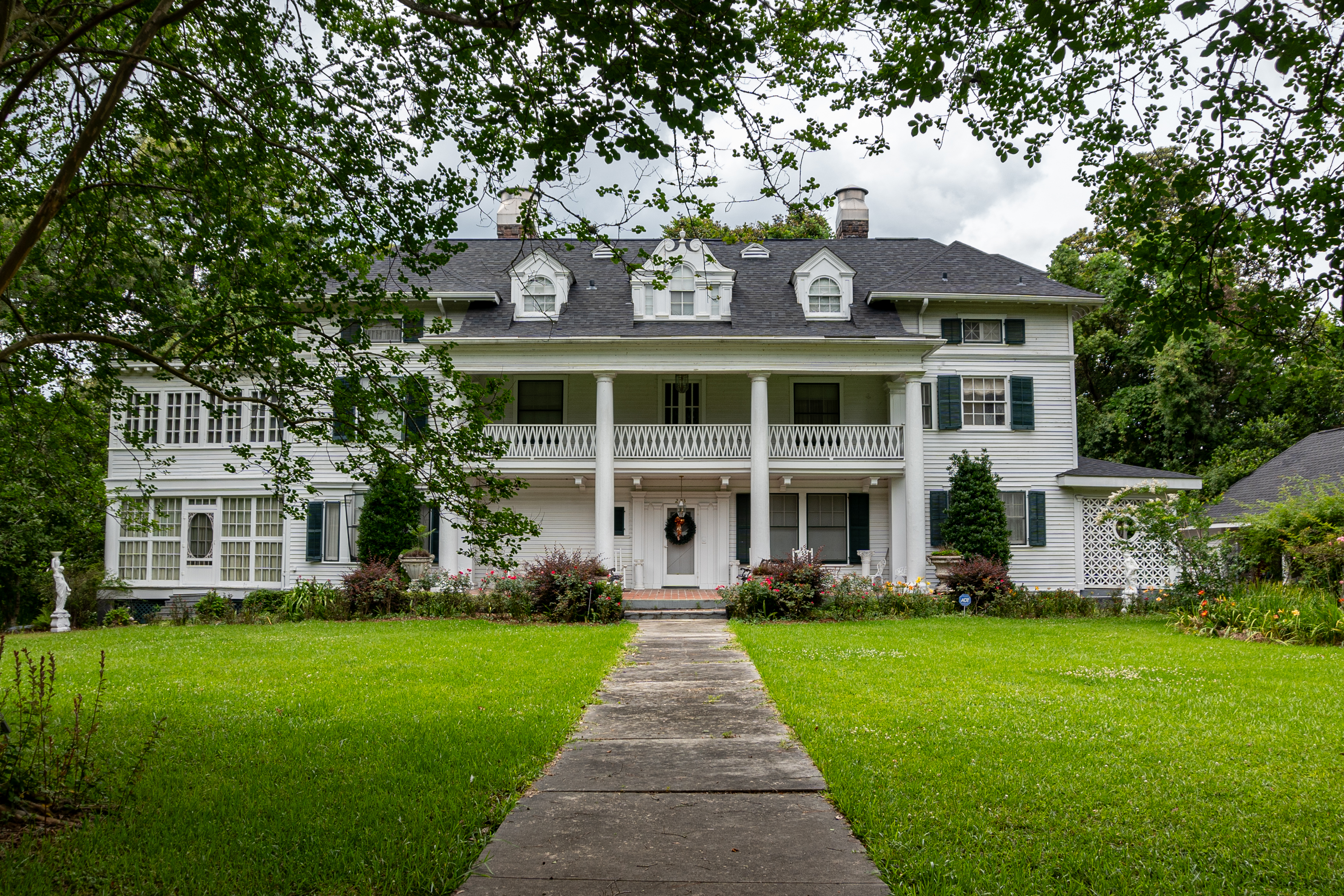

- Location within Louisiana Location within the United States
- Location: 223 S. Border Dr., Bogalusa, Louisiana
- Coordinates: 30.78°N 89.868889°W
- Area: 2.3 acres (0.93 ha)
- Built: c.1907
- Architectural style: Colonial Revival, Renaissance, Queen Anne
- NRHP reference No.: 79001096
- Added to NRHP: July 27, 1979

The Sullivan House, at 223 S. Border Drive in Bogalusa in Washington Parish, Louisiana was built in c.1907. It was listed on the National Register of Historic Places in 1979.

It is a large, generally symmetrical house with a two-and-a-half-story central block flanked by hip-roofed three-story wings. It includes a ballroom and a two-story sun porch. It reflects influences of multiple architectural styles, including Colonial Revival, Renaissance Revival, Federal, Classical Revival and Queen Anne styles, but is notable for its departure from the Queen Anne style's asymmetrical massing typical of many large houses in the region and era.

It is built of long leaf yellow pine with clapboard siding on a concrete foundation.

It is significant for its association with William Henry Sullivan (1864-1929), "the father of Bogalusa", who built the home for himself. Sullivan served as general manager of the Great Southern Lumber Company's operations in Bogalusa, was responsible for the construction of the town itself in 1907–1908, and served as the town's first mayor until his death. The house was referred to as "Official Quarters" and was the "largest and grandest" of company officials' homes in the "Little Buffalo" or "Buffalotown" section of the town.

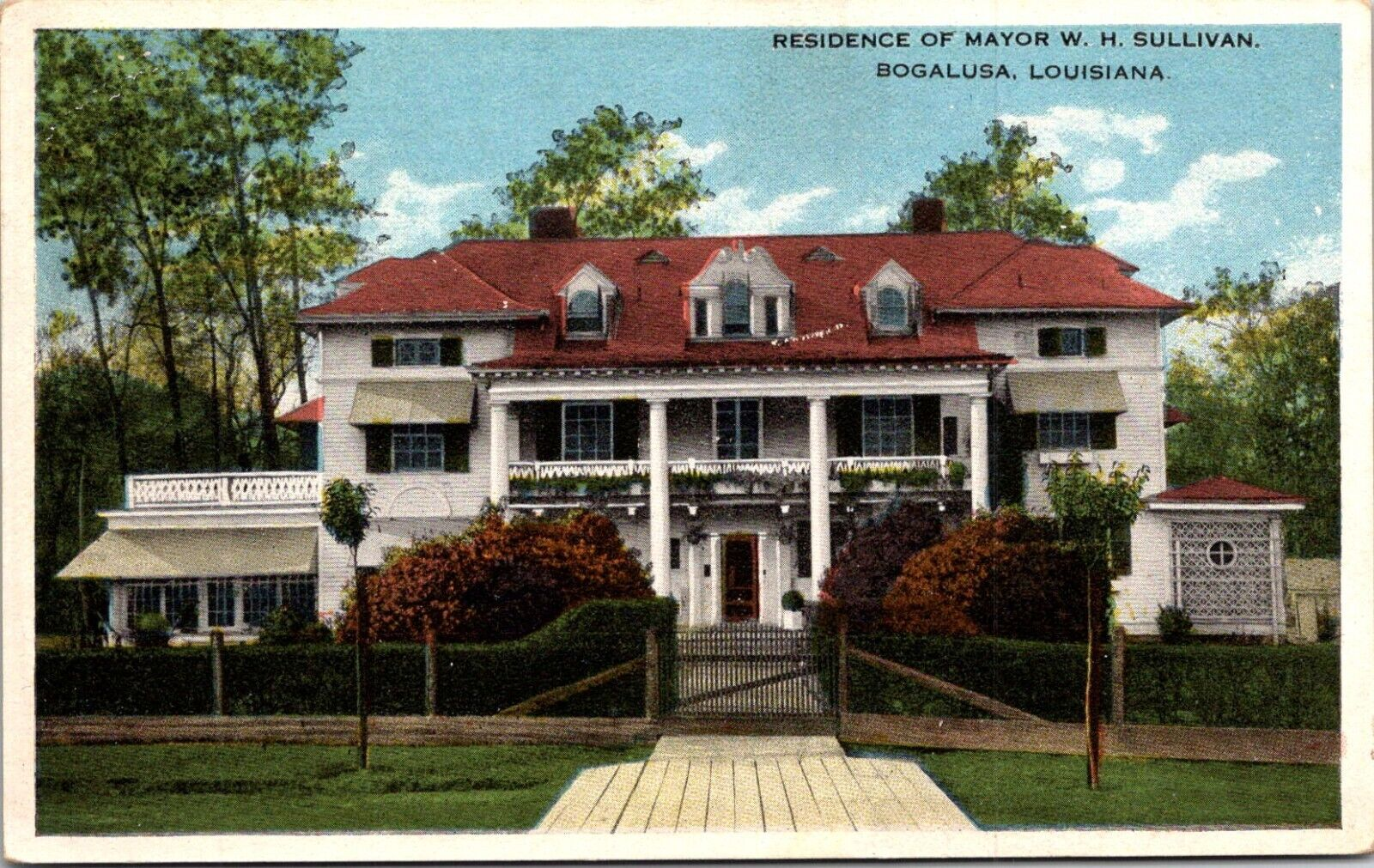
Period postcard view
