= Bogalusa station =

- Bogalusa Railroad Station
- U.S. National Register of Historic Places
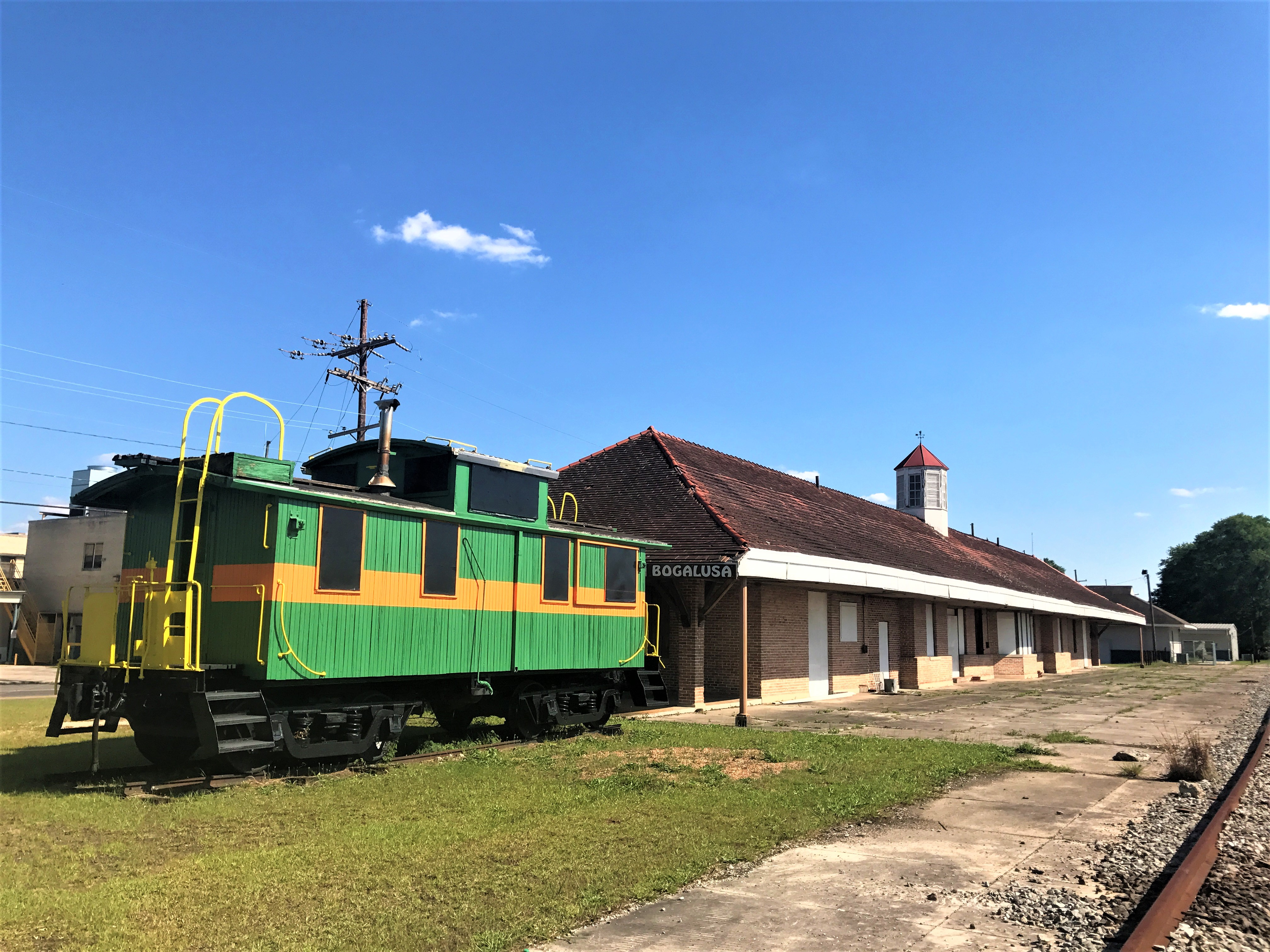
- Rear view of Bogalusa Railroad Station with NOGN RR 1907 Caboose

- Location within Louisiana
- Location: 400 Austin St., Bogalusa, Louisiana
- Coordinates: 30°47′24″N 89°51′38″W
- Area: 0.2 acres (0.081 ha)
- Built: 1907
- NRHP reference No.: 80001767
- Added to NRHP: May 1, 1980

Bogalusa Railroad Station is a historic train station in Bogalusa, Washington Parish, Louisiana. Built around 1907, it is significant in the history of local industry, commerce, and transportation, particularly related to the lumber industry.

The station was central to the development of Bogalusa, especially in its role in transporting lumber to national markets. Architecturally, it features unique design elements like semi-octagonal ticket windows and pine brackets. The building showcases specific characteristics of early 20th-century industrial architecture, focusing on functionality. Listed on the National Register of Historic Places in 1980, the Bogalusa Railroad Station symbolizes the city's early economic development and ties to the lumber industry. A sign on the station building shows the station's name in the Hobo typeface associated with the community.

The Bogalusa Railroad Station was used as part of the set for the 2025 movie Sinners featuring Michael B. Jordan.

The Bogalusa Railroad Station was the epicenter of the early growth of Bogalusa, Louisiana in the early 1900s. Built in 1907, the Bogalusa Railroad Station served the rapidly growing town and the enormous sawmill of the Great Southern Lumber Company, then the largest sawmill in the country. The town and its activities revolved around the station and the railroad. The town has become one of the largest industrial centers in the South.

A lumber mill does process lumber but also processes workers and supplies such as machinery, food and clothing for the town's residents. Many of the workers were traveling from all parts of the country looking for work and seeking a better life for themselves. The station was the life blood of the town.

In Bogalusa, a company town controlled by The Great Southern Lumber Company, every aspect of life is influenced by the town’s history. The company not only controlled the workplaces, but the housing, the stores, and even parts of the government. The railroad station was a small part of this system that dominated life in Bogalusa. It was where workers caught trains to and from work, received packages, and dealt with outsiders. The agreement also made it more difficult for employees to terminate their agreement with the company and assert their independence from the company's alleged authority.

When the plant was operating at full production, the system brought jobs and economic growth to the struggling rural South town and provided opportunities that didn’t otherwise exist for employees. But as with all systems, flaws began to reveal themselves. Employees were expected to work very long hours in hazardous conditions for minimal wages while adhering to an unwritten but binding organizational priority. Because the company controlled over many aspects of life, there were few alternatives for employees who were unhappy in the place where they worked.

By the end of World War I, tired of bad working conditions, organized labor sought to organize the workers of Bogalusa and the rest of the country. Yet in this post World War I period, attempting to organize labor in Bogalusa was particularly extraordinary for two reasons. To begin with, workers were largely Black. Moreover, the city was a Deep South town during a time when segregation and racism dominated the social order. Thus, a cooperative effort of large numbers of Black and white workers in Bogalusa was perceived as a threat to that social order.

The railroad station did not itself become part of the labor movement, but it played an important part in organizing town workers. As the transportation hub of the town, the station was where the country met the town. There were assembled the workers from all sections of the area and from all walks of life to move goods and to await trains for their own parts of the country. It was at such and place that out-of-town organizers stopped off to distribute leaflets, to speak to town workers and townspeople about the need for higher wages and better working conditions.

Conditions at the plant deteriorated with workers in an open conflict with the company. In Bogalusa in 1919 violence against blacks and violence associated with labor conflict occurred on a large scale. Efforts by some to form biracial unions were resisted strongly by those who wanted things to remain as they were. The conflict turned very violent and several were killed. This was a perilously dangerous confrontation with both economic and racial systems at stake in the South.

While the actual confrontation between workers and police did not take place at the Bogalusa Railroad Station, the location served as a focal point for the series of events because the Railroad Station symbolized the economy and aspects of daily life that the workers fought against. At the same time, the Railroad Station represented an outlet for workers who were seeking employment and ways to connect with the outside world, but were constrained by further limitations on their freedom and self determination within the station.

In addition to the normal work of a busy passenger depot in the middle of war, the station served the community as well. Because there were no automobiles or high ways at that time, the train became the primary mode of travel for long distances. As a result, the station was used by people of the community traveling to and from the station for such things as picking up mail for family serving overseas, picking up or seeing off of guests arriving on the train, or for themselves traveling by train to and from places such as visits with family or for business.

The station served not only the purpose of moving automobiles and trains through it, but also served as a focal point for people to gather. The regular trains created a community space for people to meet up with friends and family arriving on the train, as well as for people from all walks of life to hang out and socialize. The space became a community focal point, enhancing the community by bringing a sense of togetherness. Special events such as county fairs, stock shows and traveling siders first announced their arrival at this train station. The excitement and energy that these events brought to the town also enhanced the sense of community and identity with Bogalusa.

The Bogalusa Railroad Station served both the national interests of moving people and goods by railroad as well as the local community. Before World War II, men enlisting in the military left from such places as this as their families and friends said their goodbyes. On the occasion of these soldiers return from World War II, the Bogalusa Railroad Station was filled with excitement and relief.

Large, substantial footprint for this substantial building and structure within. Durable construction suitable for the site and location. Large overhangs were a feature to protect the building and its users from the relentless wet weather in Louisiana. However, it is not simply a functional building and the various decorative features to the internal and external elevations show consideration in its construction.

The Bogalusa Railroad Station received National Historic Landmark designation in 1980. The "little" building is historically significant because it is one of the remaining structures of the company town of the past. It symbolizes the role of industry in the development of many regions throughout the country.

The Bogalusa Railroad Station today is more than a simple empty shell of a two story building. It is a physical representation of the growth of an industrial town, the struggles of the workers and their families, and their fight for control and resistance to that control and other external influences. The Railroad Station, and the history it represents, speaks of control and of connection, and when we look at the old building we see not just another abandoned building, we see history, real history that affected real people.

The National Historic Landmark District as a whole is significant because all of these facets are found in one locale. The configuration of the park and museum illustrates how the town developed and functioned. Viewers can gain insight into the industrial heritage of the community and the struggles and triumphs of the workers of Bogalusa. The new museum and exhibits provide a look into the lives of the residents of Bogalusa and how they established a dynamic and thriving community in the face of opposition.

The Bogalusa Railroad Station tells the story of the opportunities and challenges posed by rapid industrial expansion early in the 20th century as the intersection of business interests, labor disputes and community needs played out through its doors. Today’s viewer can still see the contours of a town largely built from the ground up and can glimpse the often personal views of its citizens in its architecture and development.
