= Clifford–Warren House =

Historic house in Massachusetts, United States

- U.S. National Register of Historic Places
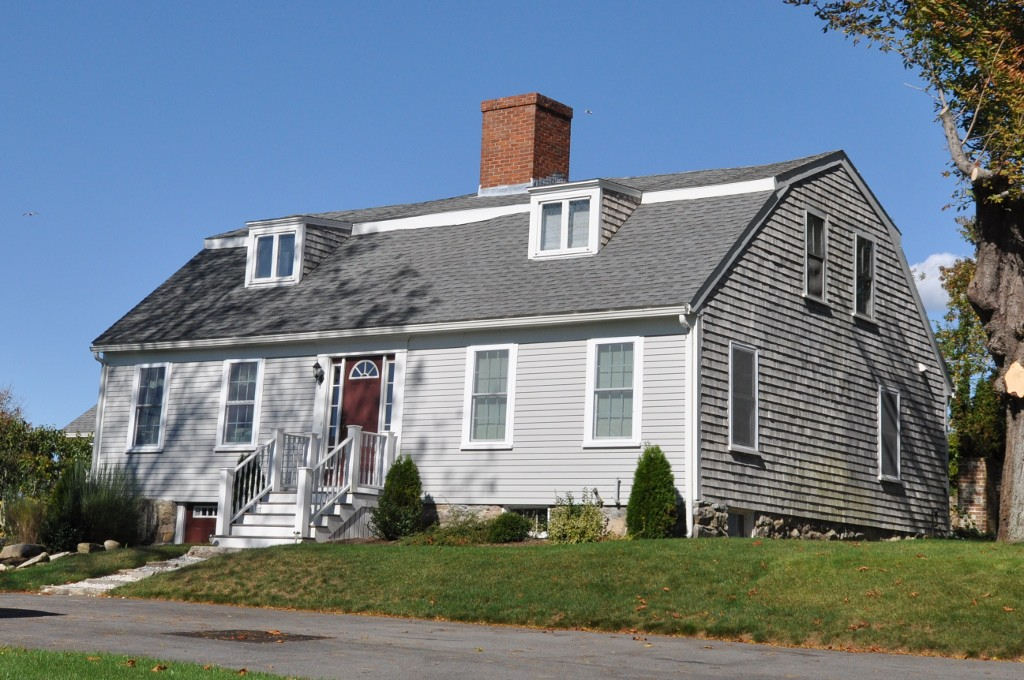

- Location within Massachusetts Location within the United States
- Nearest city: Plymouth, Massachusetts
- Coordinates: 41°56′20″N 70°37′4″W
- Area: 1.39 acres (0.56 ha)
- Built: ~1695
- NRHP reference No.: 80000666
- Added to NRHP: April 8, 1980

The Clifford–Warren House is an historic First Period house at 3 Clifford Road in Plymouth, Massachusetts. The 1 1/2-story gambrel-roofed Cape style house was built c. 1695. It is five bays wide, with a large central chimney. The house is believed to be the third on the property, which was granted to Richard Warren in 1627. Its most notable resident was probably James Warren, a noted political opponent of British rule and a Major General in the Continental Army.

The house was listed on the National Register of Historic Places in 1980.

== See also ==
- National Register of Historic Places listings in Plymouth County, Massachusetts
