= Warren House (Franklinton, Louisiana) =

- U.S. National Register of Historic Places
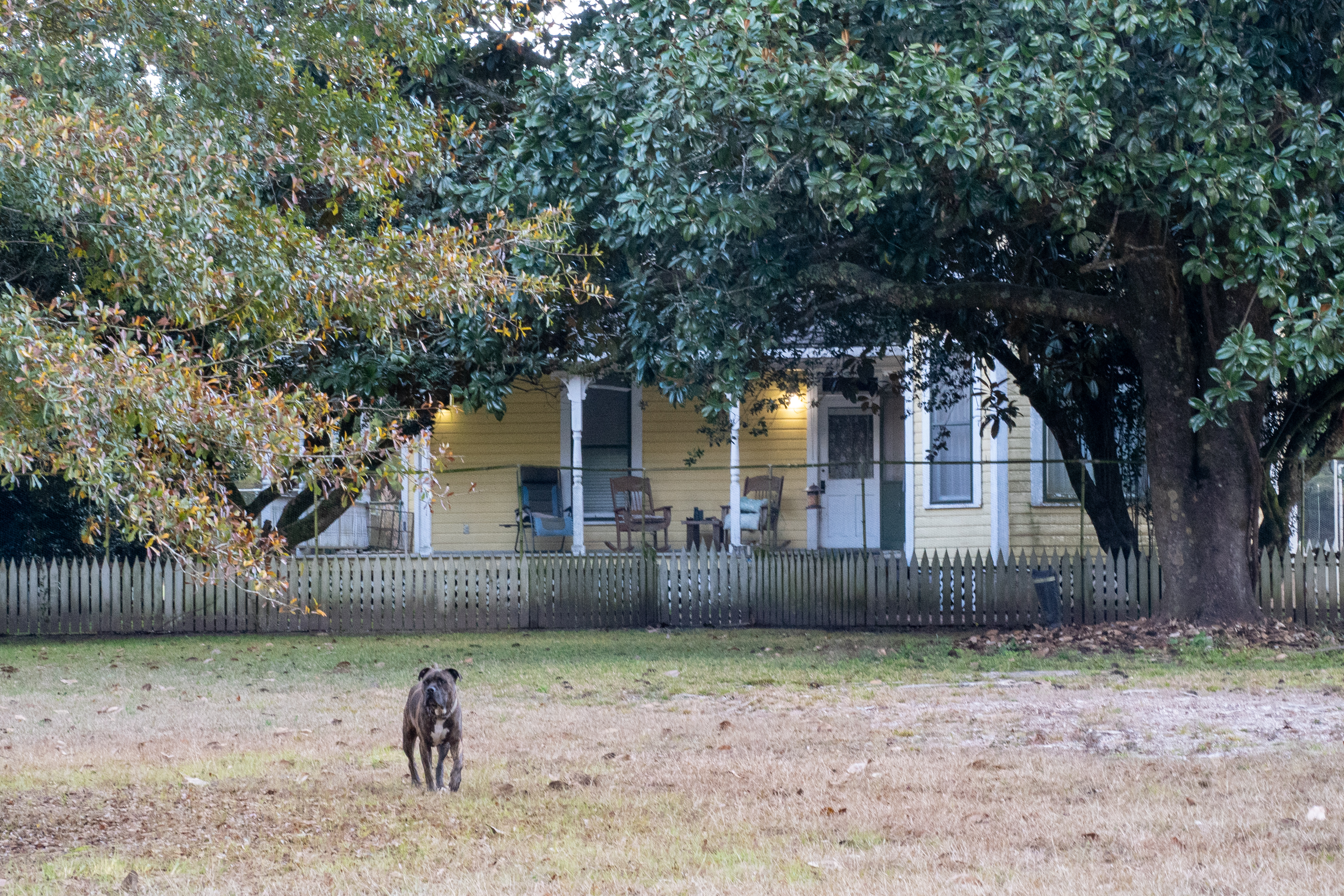

- Location within Louisiana
- Nearest city: Franklinton, Louisiana
- Coordinates: 30°57′02″N 90°10′39″W
- Area: 1 acre (0.40 ha)
- Built: 1909
- Architectural style: Stick/eastlake, Queen Anne
- NRHP reference No.: 98001442
- Added to NRHP: December 4, 1998

Warren House is a historic house near Franklinton, Washington Parish, Louisiana. Built around 1909, it is a significant example of the Stick/Eastlake and Queen Anne architectural styles.

The house features a steeply pitched hip roof, cross gables, bay windows, and a wrap-around porch. The interior is detailed with pine, wainscoting, chair rail molding, and decorated mantels. The house has been in the same family since its construction, signifying its local importance and continuity.
