= Clifford theory =

In mathematics, Clifford theory, introduced by Alfred H. Clifford (1937), describes the relation between representations of a group and those of a normal subgroup.

== Statement ==
Alfred H. Clifford proved the following result on the restriction of finite-dimensional irreducible representations from a group G to a normal subgroup N of finite index:

=== Clifford's theorem ===
Theorem. Let π: G → GL(n,K) be an irreducible representation with K a field. Then the restriction of π to N breaks up into a direct sum of irreducible representations of N of equal dimensions. These irreducible representations of N lie in one orbit for the action of G by conjugation on the equivalence classes of irreducible representations of N. In particular the number of pairwise nonisomorphic summands is no greater than the index of N in G.

Clifford's theorem yields information about the restriction of a complex irreducible character of a finite group G to a normal subgroup N. If μ is a complex character of N, then for a fixed element g of G, another character, μ^{(g)}, of N may be constructed by setting

$$\mu^{(g)}(n) = \mu(gng^{-1})$$

for all n in N. The character μ^{(g)} is irreducible if and only if μ is. Clifford's theorem states that if χ is a complex irreducible character of G, and μ is an irreducible character of N with

$\langle \chi_N,\mu \rangle \neq 0,$ then

$$\chi_N = e\left(\sum_{i=1}^{t} \mu^{(g_i)}\right),$$

where e and t are positive integers, and each g_{i} is an element of G. The integers e and t both divide the index [G:N]. The integer t is the index of a subgroup of G, containing N, known as the inertial subgroup of μ. This is

$$\{ g \in G: \mu^{(g)} = \mu \}$$

and is often denoted by

$$I_G(\mu).$$

The elements g_{i} may be taken to be representatives of all the right cosets of the subgroup I_{G}(μ) in G.

In fact, the integer e divides the index

$$[I_G(\mu):N],$$

though the proof of this fact requires some use of Schur's theory of projective representations.

== Proof of Clifford's theorem ==
The proof of Clifford's theorem is best explained in terms of modules (and the module-theoretic version works for irreducible modular representations). Let K be a field, V be an irreducible K[G]-module, V_{N} be its restriction to N and U be an irreducible K[N]-submodule of V_{N}. For each g in G and n in N, the equality $n.g.U = g.g^{-1}.n.g.U = g.U$ holds, since N was a normal subgroup of G. Therefore, g.U is an irreducible K[N]-submodule of V_{N}, and $\sum_{g \in G} g.U$ is a K[G]-submodule of V, hence must be all of V by irreducibility. Now V_{N} is expressed as a sum of irreducible submodules, and this expression may be refined to a direct sum. The proof of the character-theoretic statement of the theorem may now be completed in the case K = C. Let χ be the character of G afforded by V and μ be the character of N afforded by U. For each g in G, the C[N]-submodule g.U affords the character μ^{(g)} and $\langle \chi_N,\mu^{(g)}\rangle = \langle \chi_N^{(g)},\mu^{(g)}\rangle = \langle \chi_N,\mu \rangle$. The respective equalities follow because χ is a class-function of G and N is a normal subgroup. The integer e appearing in the statement of the theorem is this common multiplicity.

== Corollary of Clifford's theorem ==
A corollary of Clifford's theorem, which is often exploited, is that the irreducible character χ appearing in the theorem is induced from an irreducible character of the inertial subgroup I_{G}(μ). If, for example, the irreducible character χ is primitive (that is, χ is not induced from any proper subgroup of G), then G = I_{G}(μ) and χ_{N} = eμ. A case where this property of primitive characters is used particularly frequently is when N is Abelian and χ is faithful (that is, its kernel contains just the identity element). In that case, μ is linear, N is represented by scalar matrices in any representation affording character χ and N is thus contained in the center of G. For example, if G is the symmetric group S_{4}, then G has a faithful complex irreducible character χ of degree 3. There is an Abelian normal subgroup N of order 4 (a Klein 4-subgroup) which is not contained in the center of G. Hence χ is induced from a character of a proper subgroup of G containing N. The only possibility is that χ is induced from a linear character of a Sylow 2-subgroup of G.

== Further developments ==
Clifford's theorem has led to a branch of representation theory in its own right, now known as Clifford theory. This is particularly relevant to the representation theory of finite solvable groups, where normal subgroups usually abound. For more general finite groups, Clifford theory often allows representation-theoretic questions to be reduced to questions about groups that are close (in a sense which can be made precise) to being simple.

George Mackey (1976) found a more precise version of this result for the restriction of irreducible unitary representations of locally compact groups to closed normal subgroups in what has become known as the "Mackey machine" or "Mackey normal subgroup analysis".
