= Borland–Clifford House =

Historic house in Nevada, United States

- U.S. National Register of Historic Places
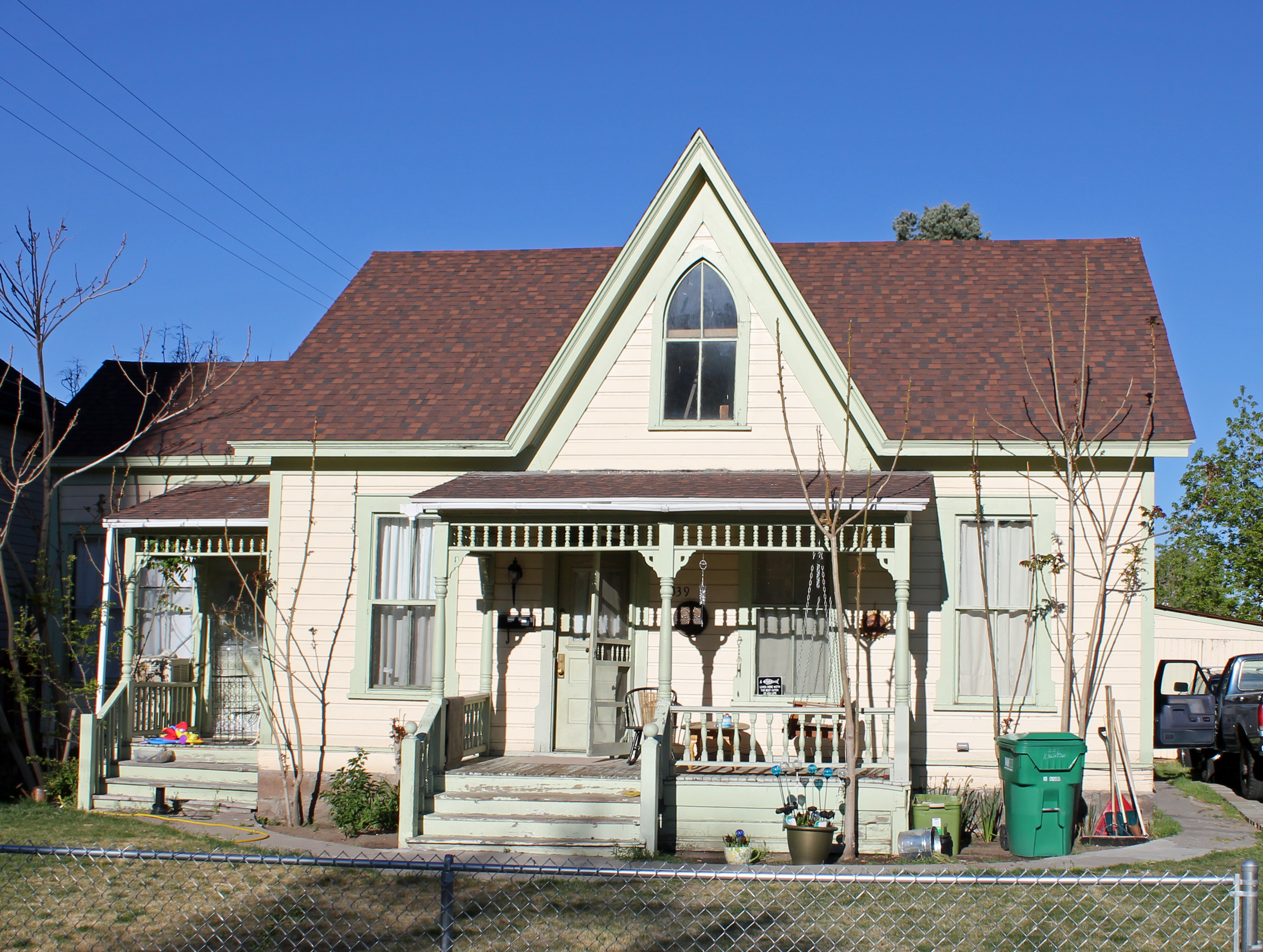

- Location within Nevada Location within the United States
- Location: 339 Ralston St., Reno, Nevada
- Coordinates: 39°31′42″N 119°49′11″W
- Area: 0.3 acres (0.12 ha)
- Built: 1885
- Architect: James Borland
- Architectural style: Carpenter Gothic
- NRHP reference No.: 83001114
- Added to NRHP: March 07, 1983

The Borland–Clifford House, also known as the Clifford House, is a historic Carpenter Gothic house located at 339 Ralston Street in Reno, Washoe County, Nevada. The house is one of the few extant houses in Reno which were built in the 19th century.

== History ==
Built in 1885 by James Borland, it remained in his ownership until 1902. It 1907 it was bought by O. J. Clifford and it remained in his family until 1984 and is still in private ownership. On March 7, 1983, it was added to the National Register of Historic Places as the Clifford House. On June 24, 2008, additional documentation was added to include Borland's name in the listing title.

== Location ==
The house was one of the first houses to be built in the Reno's Western Addition Neighborhood. It has been moved several times, to places including Ralston, 4th street, Arlington Avenue, and Plumb Lane.

In 2018, the house was disassembled and moved to downtown Reno.

== Ownership ==
In 2018, the house was purchased by Jacobs Entertainment for 720,000 dollars. The company later sold the house to Archie Granata for 10 dollars.
