= Cane River National Heritage Trail =

The Cane River National Heritage Trail is a Louisiana Scenic Byway that follows several different state highways, primarily:

- LA 1, LA 119, and LA 494 generally along the east bank of the Cane River from Lena to Natchitoches; and
- LA 6 and LA 485 branching off of the river from Natchitoches to Allen via Robeline.
