= List of state highways in Louisiana (pre-1955) =

- Original 1924 Louisiana shields

System information
- Notes: This system of highways was changed during the 1955 Louisiana Highway renumbering.
- State: Louisiana State Route X (LA X)

The following is a list of state highways in the U.S. state of Louisiana designated in prior to the 1955 Louisiana Highway renumbering. All were part of the original 98 state highways authorized by the state legislature in 1921.

== List ==
Number	Length (mi)	Length (km)	Southern or western terminus	Northern or eastern terminus	Formed	Removed	Notes
SR 1	—	—	south of Pointe à la Hache	US 80 at the Texas state line	1924	1955	Became portions of US 71, US 171 and US 80
SR 1-D	—	—	—	—	1924	—	
SR 2	—	—	Texas state line	Mississippi state line	1924	1955	Became US 90 (portions now I-10)
SR 3	—	—	Baton Rouge Mississippi state line at Vidalia	Mississippi state line at St. Francisville Arkansas state line north of Lake Providence	1924	1955	Southern segment became part of US 61, northern segment became part of US 65
SR 3-D	—	—	SR 3/US 65 north of Lake Providence	SR 3/US 65 at Millikin	1931	1955	
SR 4	—	—	Mississippi state line	SR 1 in Shreveport	1924	1955	Became a portion of US 80
SR 5	—	—	—	—	1924	1955	
SR 5-D	—	—	—	—	1924	1955	
SR 6	—	—	Texas state line at the Sabine River	Mississippi state line at Vidalia	1924	1955	Western half became LA 6, eastern half became US 84
SR 7	—	—	Texas state line at the Sabine River	Mississippi state line at Bogalusa	1924	1955	Ripley to Mississippi became US 190, remainder became LA 12 and LA 81
SR 7-X	—	—	—	—	1955	1955	
SR 8	—	—	US 71/SR 55 north of Shreveport	Texas state line northwest of Rodessa	1924	1955	Became the northernmost section of LA 1
SR 9	—	—	—	—	1924	1955	
SR 10	—	—	Bossier City	Arkansas state line near Plain Dealing	1924	1955	Became LA 3
SR 10-D	—	—	—	—	1921	1955	
SR 11	—	—	—	—	1921	1955	
SR 12	—	—	Creston	Homer	1921	1955	Became the central section of LA 9
SR 13	—	—	US 71/SR 10 at Loggy Bayou	US 80/SR 4 west of West Monroe	1921	1955	Split among seven routes
SR 14	—	—	US 67/US 167/SR 1 in Alexandria	Arkansas state line near Mer Rouge	1921	1955	Much of route became US 165; one section became LA 139
SR 14-D	—	—	—	—	1921	1955	
SR 15	—	—	US 65/US 84/SR 6 in Ferriday	SR 11 in Farmersville	1921	1955	Became LA 15
SR 15-D	—	—	US 65/SR 16 near Red Gum	US 65/SR 3 in Clayton	1938	1955	
SR 16	—	—	Arkansas state line at Kilbourne	Winnsboro	1921	1955	Became LA 17
SR 17	—	—	—	—	1921	1955	
SR 18	—	—	Harrisonburg	Sicily Island	1921	1955	Became a portion of LA 8
SR 19	—	—	Colfax	Harrisonburg	1921	1955	Became a portion of LA 8
SR 20	—	—	Alexandria	Shreveport	1921	1955	Became a portion of LA 1
SR 21	—	—	Texas state line	Slagle	1921	1955	Became a portion of LA 8
SR 22	—	—	—	—	1921	1955	
SR 22-D	—	—	—	—	1921	1955	
SR 23	—	—	US 167/SR 22 west of Ville Platte	dead end at Gold Dust	1921	1955	Split among four routes, including LA 106
SR 24	—	—	—	—	1921	1955	
SR 24-D	—	—	—	—	1921	1955	
SR 24-E	—	—	—	—	1921	1955	
SR 25	—	—	—	—	1921	1955	
SR 25-D	—	—	—	—	1921	1955	
SR 26	—	—	Kaplan	SR 1 near Lecompte	1921	1955	Extended south to Forked Island in 1928; Turkey Creek to SR 1 became US 167 and remainder became LA 13 and LA 35
SR 26-D	—	—	—	—	1921	1955	
SR 27	—	—	—	—	1921	1955	
SR 28	—	—	—	—	1921	1955	
SR 29	—	—	—	—	1921	1955	
SR 30	—	—	—	—	1921	1955	
SR 30-D	—	—	—	—	1921	1955	
SR 30-E	—	—	SR 30 near Lettsworth	SR 30 near Simmesport	1928	1955	
SR 30-F	—	—	—	—	1921	1955	
SR 31	—	—	—	—	1921	1955	
SR 32	—	—	—	—	1921	1955	
SR 33	—	—	South Carollton Avenue in New Orleans	Mississippi state line near Frenier	1921	1955	Became US 51
SR 34	—	—	Slidell	Mississippi state line at Warnerton	1921	1955	Covington to Slidell became US 190, remainder became LA 25
SR 35	—	—	Amite City	Franklinton	1921	1955	Became portions of LA 10 and LA 16
SR 36	—	—	—	—	1921	1955	
SR 37	—	—	—	—	1921	1955	
SR 38	—	—	Logansport	Keachi	1921	1955	Became a portion of LA 5
SR 39	—	—	US 171/SR 42 in Leesville	SR 6 at Hagewood	1921	1955	Became LA 117
SR 40	—	—	—	—	1921	1955	
SR 41	—	—	SR 1 east of Melville	SR 30 in Morganza	1921	1955	Became a portion of LA 10
SR 42	—	—	Cameron	SR 9/US 84 at Mansfield	1921	1955	Became a portion of US 171
SR 42-D	—	—	—	—	1921	1955	
SR 42-E	—	—	—	—	1921	1955	
SR 43	—	—	Breaux Bridge	Gulf Intracoastal Waterway	1921	1955	Originally Breaux Bridge-Abbeville, extended to the Gulf Intracoastal Waterway in 1926; Lafayette-Abbeville became US 167, remainder became LA 94, LA 82 and LA 333
SR 44	—	—	US 80/SR 4 in Ruston	SR 15 southwest of Farmerville	1921	1955	Became the southern half of LA 33
SR 45	—	—	—	—	1921	1955	
SR 46	—	—	—	—	1921	1955	
SR 47	—	—	SR 15 north of Mangham	SR 14 south of Bastrop	1921	1955	Split among five routes
SR 48	—	—	—	—	1921	1955	
SR 49	—	—	—	—	1921	1955	
SR 50	—	—	Campti	Goldonna	1921	1955	Campti-Creston became LA 9, Creston-Goldonna became LA 156
SR 51	—	—	—	—	1921	1955	
SR 52	—	—	US 171/US 190/SR 42 southeast of DeRidder	US 165/SR 24/SR 25 in Oberlin	1921	1955	
SR 53	—	—	SR 1 in LaPlace	SR 33/SR 1141 in Frenier	1921	1955	Became a portion of US 51
SR 55	—	—	US 79/US 80/SR 4 in Shreveport	Arkansas state line north of Ida	1921	1955	Became a portion of US 71
SR 56	—	—	US 90/SR 2 in New Iberia	dead end at Lake Dauterive	1921	1955	Much of route became LA 86 except the section from Loreauville to Lake Dauterive (which became LA 3242)
SR 57	—	—	SR 5 north of Marksville dead end at the Little River	SR 123 northeast of Holloway US 84/SR 6/SR 19 in Jena	1921	1955	Became a portion of LA 107
SR 57-D	—	—	SR 57 north of Effie	US 165/SR 14 in Pineville	1921	1955	Became a portion of LA 107
SR 58	—	—	—	—	1921	1955	
SR 59	—	—	—	—	1921	1955	
SR 60	—	—	dead end at East Cote Blanche Bay	US 90/SR 2 in Centerville	1921	1955	Renumbered to LA 317
SR 61	—	—	SR 1 in Chalmette	US 90/SR 2 in New Orleans	1921	1955	Renumbered to LA 47
SR 62	—	—	dead end in Delacroix	SR 32 west of Yscloskey	1921	1955	
SR 63	—	—	SR 1 in Geismar	SR 1 in Baton Rouge	1921	1955	Renumbered to LA 30
SR 64	—	—	SR 17 northeast of Columbia	SR 47 south of Rayville	1921	1955	
SR 65	—	—	—	—	1921	1955	
SR 66	—	—	—	—	1921	1955	
SR 67	—	—	SR 15 at Foules Tensas River	dead end at the Tensas River US 65/SR 3 in Waterproof	1921	1955	
SR 68	—	—	SR 18 in Harrisonburg	US 165/SR 14 and SR 110 in Grayson	1921	1955	
SR 69	—	—	Montegut	Klondyke	1921	1955	Became the northern section of LA 55
SR 70	—	—	—	—	1921	1955	
SR 71	—	—	Chipola	Clifton	1921	1955	Originally continued south along current LA 25 to Franklinton, but this was removed after 1937; became a portion of LA 38
SR 72	—	—	SR 5 west of Fifth Ward	SR C-1471 in Mansura	1921	1955	Became a portion of LA 114
SR 72-D	—	—	—	—	1921	1955	
SR 73	—	—	SR 1 west of Port Allen	SR 30 in Erwinville	1921	1955	
SR 74	—	—	SR 3 near Lindsay	SR 35 near Jackson	1921	1955	Became a portion of LA 68
SR 75	—	—	—	—	1921	1955	
SR 76	—	—	SR 48 southwest of Newlight	SR C-2171 in Newellton	1921	1955	Became a portion of LA 4
SR 77	—	—	—	—	1921	1955	
SR 78	—	—	—	—	1921	1955	
SR 79	—	—	—	—	1921	1955	
SR 80	—	—	—	—	1921	1955	
SR 81	—	—	Sea Breeze	Montegut	1921	1955	Became the southern portion of LA 55
SR 82	—	—	—	—	1921	1955	
SR 83	—	—	—	—	1921	1955	
SR 84	—	—	—	—	1921	1955	
SR 85	—	—	SR 21 in Hineston	US 165/SR 205 north of Forest Hill	1921	1955	
SR 86	—	—	St. Martinville	Catahoula	1921	1955	Became the eastern portion of LA 96
SR 87	—	—	—	—	1921	1955	
SR 88	—	—	—	—	1921	1955	
SR 89	—	—	—	—	1921	1955	
SR 90	—	—	—	—	1921	1955	
SR 91	—	—	Norwood	Slaughter	1921	1955	Became the northern portion of LA 19
SR 92	—	—	US 71/SR 1 in Morrow	SR 30 in Cottonport	1921	1955	Became a portion of LA 107
SR 93	—	—	SR 30 in Lakeland	SR 30 in New Roads	1921	1955	
SR 94	—	—	SR 1288 north of Lake Providence	SR 3-D at Highland	1921	1955	
SR 95	—	—	—	—	1921	1955	
SR 96	—	—	—	—	1921	1955	
SR 97	—	—	—	—	1921	1955	
SR 98	—	—	Holmwood	Lake Arthur	1921	1955	Became a portion of LA 14
SR 99	—	—	—	—	1921	1955	
SR 100	—	—	—	—	1921	1955	
SR 105	—	—	SR 98 southwest of Thomwell	SR 24 near Fenton	1926	1955	Became the southern section of LA 99
SR 107	—	—	Slagle	Boyce	1926	1955	Became a portion of LA 8
SR 115	—	—	Homer	Junction City	1928	1955	Became the northern section of LA 9
SR 123	—	—	—	—	1926	1955	
SR 124	—	—	Bains	Angola State Farm	1926	1955	Renumbered to LA 66
SR 136	—	—	SR 30 southwest of New Roads	SR 1 near Livonia	1928	1955	Renumbered to LA 78
SR 139	—	—	—	—	1928	1955	Became part of LA 313 and LA 314
SR 144	—	—	Boyce	Colfax	1928	1955	Became a portion of LA 8
SR 152	—	—	Slaughter	Scotlandville	1928	1955	Became the southern portion of LA 19
SR 204	—	—	Bastrop	Arkansas state line	—	1955	Became a portion of LA 139 (now US 425)
SR 235	—	—	—	—	—	1955	
SR 239	—	—	SR 15 at Winnsboro	Caldwell-Franklin parish line	1928	1955	Shortened to Ogden before 1955; renumbered to LA 130
SR 309	—	—	SR 14 near Kingsville	Artillery range in Camp Beauregard	1928	1955	Renumbered to LA 116
SR 325	—	—	—	—	1928	1955	
SR 371	—	—	Jennings	Basile	1928	1955	Renumbered to LA 97
SR 410	—	—	Loop off SR 63 (later LA 30, now LA 75)		1928	1955	Renumbered to LA 141
SR 446	—	—	SR 56 at Loreauville	north side of New Iberia	1928	1955	Became a portion of LA 86
SR 452	—	—	3rd Street in Kenner	19th Street (now West Metairie Avenue) in Kenner	1928	—	Absorbed into SR 1249
SR 479	—	—	SR 2 near Billeaud	St. Martinsville	1928	1955	Became the western portion of LA 96
SR 617	—	—	—	—	1921	1955	
SR 623	—	—	—	—	1930	—	
SR 714	—	—	Pine Island	Lauderdale	1930	1955	Became the northern section of LA 99
SR 748	—	—	Keachi	Kingston	—	1955	Became a portion of LA 5
SR 1092	—	—	—	—	—	1955	Designation for bypassed portions of SR 2
SR 1121	—	—	SR 1	Garyville	1930	1955	Extended north to US 61 in 1932; renumbered to LA 54
SR 1122	—	—	—	—	—	1955	Renumbered to LA 53
SR 1249	—	—	Williams Street in Kenner	SR 33 in Kenner	1930	1955	Along Williams Boulevard; renumbered to LA 49
SR C-1490	—	—	SR 204	Arkansas state line south of Crossett	—	1955	Renumbered to LA 142
SR C-1500	—	—	—	—	—	1955	
SR C-1557	—	—	Collinston	Mer Rouge	c. 1940	1955	Became a portion of LA 138
SR C-1604	—	—	SR 1294 in Fairbanks	SR 11/US 165 east of Sterlington	c. 1940	1955	Renumbered to LA 136
SR C-1943	—	—	Lottie	Fordoche	c. 1940	1955	Became the northern section of LA 81
SR C-2032	—	—	Lydia	SR 2 in Jeanerette	c. 1950	1955	Former SR 447, SR 1185 and SR 1193; renumbered to LA 85
SR C-2074	—	—	Across Bayou Lafourche		—	1955	Renumbered to LA 364
SR C-2168	—	—	—	—	—	1955	Renumbered to LA 325
SR C-2174	—	—	—	—	—	1955	Original routing of SR 152 between Baker and Zachary; section in Zachary became LA 1203
Former
