= Louisiana Highway 49 =

State highway in Louisiana, United States

Louisiana Highway 49
- Williams Boulevard

Route information
- Maintained by Louisiana DOTD
- Length: 3.93 mi (6.32 km)
- Existed: 1955 renumbering–present

Major junctions
- South end: US 61 in Kenner
- I-10 in Kenner
- North end: Joe Yenni Boulevard / 44th Street in Kenner

Location
- Country: United States
- State: Louisiana
- Parishes: Jefferson

Highway system
- Louisiana State Highway System; Interstate; US; State; Scenic
| ← I-49 | → LA 50 |
| ← SR 1248 | 1249 | → SR 1250 |

Louisiana Highway 49 (LA 49) is a state highway located in Jefferson Parish, Louisiana. It runs 3.93 miles (6.32 km) in a north–south direction along Williams Boulevard from U.S. Highway 61 (US 61) to an intersection with Joe Yenni Boulevard and 44th Street in Kenner.

The route serves as the principal north–south thoroughfare of the city of Kenner, a suburb of New Orleans, and is lined almost continuously with shopping centers, eating establishments, and other commercial services. It is also heavily traveled due to its proximity to Louis Armstrong New Orleans International Airport, and it intersects many of the major east–west routes through neighboring Metairie, including Interstate 10 (I-10), Airline Drive (US 61), West Metairie Avenue, Veterans Memorial Boulevard, and West Esplanade Avenue.

LA 49 is primarily known by its local name of Williams Boulevard, and signage identifying the route is only present at its two major junctions, I-10 and US 61.

== Route description ==
From the south, LA 49 begins at an intersection with US 61 (Airline Drive) 1.0 mile (1.6 km) east of the main entrance to Louis Armstrong New Orleans International Airport. It proceeds north as a divided, four-lane highway along Williams Boulevard through a largely residential neighborhood known as Kenner Heights. After 0.8 miles (1.3 km), LA 49 intersects West Metairie Avenue opposite Kenner City Hall, and the median gives way to a center turning lane. Now flanked by commercial establishments, LA 49 continues north through the center of the Highway Park subdivision. After another 1.1 miles (1.8 km), LA 49 intersects Veterans Memorial Boulevard, the principal east–west commercial thoroughfare of Kenner and neighboring Metairie. Here it widens to a divided, six-lane highway and remains in that capacity for the remainder of its route. It then immediately enters a complex interchange with I-10 at exit 223. I-10 heads toward Baton Rouge to the west and New Orleans to the east.

Just north of the I-10 interchange, LA 49 intersects 32nd Street, which leads to the nearby Esplanade Mall. LA 49 continues north through intersections with West Esplanade Avenue and Vintage Drive as it passes alongside the Driftwood Park neighborhood. The route ends 0.4 miles (0.64 km) later at an intersection with a local road known as Joe Yenni Boulevard on the west and 44th Street on the east. Williams Boulevard continues north a short distance past the Pontchartrain Center, a large multi-purpose arena, to the Laketown recreation area and the Treasure Chest Casino on Lake Pontchartrain.

The route is classified as an urban principal arterial south of I-10 and an urban minor arterial north of I-10 by the Louisiana Department of Transportation and Development (La DOTD). Average daily traffic volume in 2013 is reported as follows: 20,700 from the southern terminus to West Metairie Avenue; 34,200 to Veterans Memorial Boulevard; and 48,200 to the northern terminus. The entire route has a posted speed limit of 40 mph (65 km/h).

== History ==
=== Pre-1955 route numbering ===
State Route 1249
- Location: Kenner
- Length: 4.6 mi (7.4 km)
- Existed: 1930–1955

In the original Louisiana Highway system in use between 1921 and 1955, the modern LA 49 was part of two routes. The first was State Route 452, designated in 1928. Route 452 followed Williams Boulevard from 3rd Street northward to what was then the Kenner city limits at 19th Street (now West Metairie Avenue). At the time, 3rd Street was part of the main route between New Orleans and Baton Rouge, followed first by the Jefferson Highway auto trail in 1916. This became State Route 1 in 1921 and the original route of US 61 in 1926.

In 1930, State Route 1249 was designated as an extension of Route 452, continuing the route of Williams Boulevard from 19th Street northward to Route 33.

Route 1249. Commencing at the intersection of Williams and Nineteenth Streets, Kenner, thence in a northerly direction along Williams Street to its intersection with the Lake Shore Highway.

— 1930 legislative route description

Route 33 was the New Orleans–Hammond Lakeshore Highway, an ambitious scenic highway project that was intended to be part of US 51 but never completed. From 1933 to 1939, the section of Williams Boulevard south of Airline Highway served as a temporary link in US 61 while Airline Highway was being reconstructed between Kenner and Shrewsbury.

Later maps show the entirety of Williams Boulevard as Route 1249 only, apparently absorbing Route 452, and remaining so until the 1955 Louisiana Highway renumbering.

=== Post-1955 route history ===
LA 49 was created in 1955 as a direct renumbering of Route 1249.

Class "B": La 49—From a junction with La 48 at or near Kenner to a junction with La-US 61.
Class "C": La 49—From a junction with La-US 61 in Kenner on or near Williams Boulevard to or near Lake Pontchartrain.

— 1955 legislative route description

At this time, the route still followed the entirety of Williams Boulevard from the Mississippi River at 3rd Street, which was now LA 48, to Lake Pontchartrain. Since the late 1980s redevelopment of Kenner's riverfront as the Rivertown Historic District, the southern portion of the route between LA 48 and US 61 has been returned to local control. The northern end of LA 49 has also been slightly shortened from its original terminus at the Lake Pontchartrain levee.

== Future ==
La DOTD is currently engaged in a program that aims to transfer about 5,000 miles (8,000 km) of state-owned roadways to local governments over the next several years. Under this plan of "right-sizing" the state highway system, the portion of LA 49 north of I-10 is proposed for deletion as it does not meet a significant interurban travel function.

== Major intersections ==
The entire highway is in Kenner, Jefferson Parish.

| mi | km | Destinations | Notes |
|---|---|---|---|
| 0.0 | 0.0 | US 61 (Airline Drive) – New Orleans, N.O. Int'l Airport | Southern terminus |
| 2.0– 2.4 | 3.2– 3.9 | I-10 – New Orleans, Baton Rouge | Exit 223 on I-10 |
| 3.9 | 6.3 | End state maintenance at intersection of Williams Boulevard, Joe Yenni Boulevard, and 44th Street | Northern terminus |
1.000 mi = 1.609 km; 1.000 km = 0.621 mi
