= Harrisonburg Road =

Old road in Louisiana and Texas, USA

The Harrisonburg Road was an old wagon train road in Louisiana which connected the Natchez Trace to the El Camino Real in Texas. In modern times the route has been called the Natchez Trace on some highway markers and the El Camino Real in other places, but the original name would have been the Harrisonburg Road.

== Route ==
The route ran from the Mississippi Natchez Trace to Harrisonburg to Manifest following the current path of LA 8 turning at Manifest onto the current path of Old Jena Road where it becomes LA 722 at Jena. It then followed US 84 to Trout and then turning at the location of LA 500 running to Ganneyville and then to Georgetown. Crossing US 165, it ran near the current LA 500 to Packton, crossing US 167 and running down what is now a forest service road called the Packton-Alexandria Rd. It went through Five Forks crossing LA 1228 to Atlanta, then ran to Clarence near LA 6 to Natchitoches. It then went to Texas via LA 6 through Robeline and Many . It connected to the El Camino Real.

== Markers ==
Markers exist at Clarence on US 84

== Current Political ==
US 84 has been designated by five state legislatures as part of the El Camino East/West Corridor. The designation was in recognition of its history as a migration route from the Atlantic coast to the present U.S.-Mexico border. The designation is intended to promote the route for both tourism and NAFTA-facilitated trade with Mexico. However the route designated US 84 Is nowhere near the actual path of the Harrisonburg Road as it did not pass through the same towns US 84 passes through. The states involved are asking for federal funds to 4 lane the US 84 El Camino East/West Corridor.
