= Louisiana Highway 54 =

State highway in Louisiana, United States

Louisiana Highway 54

Route information
- Maintained by Louisiana DOTD
- Length: 2.34 mi (3.77 km)
- Existed: 1955 renumbering–present

Major junctions
- South end: LA 44 in Garyville
- North end: US 61 in Garyville

Location
- Country: United States
- State: Louisiana
- Parishes: St. John the Baptist

Highway system
- Louisiana State Highway System; Interstate; US; State; Scenic
← LA 53	→ I-55
← SR 1120	1121	→ SR 1122

Louisiana Highway 54 (LA 54) is a state highway located in St. John the Baptist Parish, Louisiana. It runs 2.34 miles (3.77 km) in a north–south direction from LA 44 to U.S. Highway 61 (US 61) in Garyville.

The route connects the community of Garyville with US 61 between New Orleans and Baton Rouge and provides a truck route for the nearby industrial plants along the Mississippi River.

== Route description ==
From the south, LA 54 begins at an intersection with LA 44, which runs alongside the east bank levee of the Mississippi River and is commonly known as River Road. It proceeds north, running between the Nalco chemical plant to the west and the residential center of Garyville to the east. Within its short route, LA 54 crosses two railroad lines at grade, the Canadian National Railway (CN) midway along its route and the Kansas City Southern Railway (KCS) near its northern terminus. LA 54 ends at an intersection with US 61 (Airline Highway), which parallels I-10 between New Orleans and Baton Rouge.

Much of LA 54 passes through a wooded area on a wide right-of-way with some scattered businesses and access to a few residential subdivisions. It serves to connect Garyville to US 61 and provides a trucking corridor for the Nalco plant and other industrial facilities along the river. The route is classified as an urban collector by the Louisiana Department of Transportation and Development (La DOTD) with an average daily traffic volume of 1,470 in 2013. LA 54 is an undivided, two-lane highway for its entire length with a posted speed limit of 55 mph (90 km/h).

== History ==
=== Pre-1955 route numbering ===
State Route 1121
- Location: Garyville
- Length: 2.7 mi (4.3 km)
- Existed: 1930–1955

In the original Louisiana Highway system in use between 1921 and 1955, the modern LA 54 corridor was designated as State Route 1121.

Route 1121. A certain road at Garyville starting from the Jefferson Highway, U. S. Route 61, thence proceeding towards the Y. & M. V. R. R.[,] crossing same, and continuing as far as the intersection of Park Street, thence over Park Street, back to the Y. & M. V. R. R. along Main Street, and thence along the Y. & M. V. R. R. to the above described road crossing; all located in the town of Hopeville, which road is commonly known as the Hopeville road.

— 1930 legislative route description

Route 1121 was created in 1930 by an act of the state legislature. It originally existed as a spur off of Route 1 serving Garyville, which was situated around a lumber mill. At the time, the main route between New Orleans and Baton Rouge was the Jefferson Highway, an auto trail which followed the modern River Road past Garyville. This had become part of Route 1 in 1921 and the original route of US 61 in 1926. Route 1121 followed a parallel alignment to the modern LA 54, running through the center of Garyville to the north side of the Yazoo & Mississippi Valley (now the Canadian National) railroad tracks. It then made a loop back across the tracks to an intersection with itself.

Airline Highway, the relocation of US 61, opened through the area in July 1932. Around this time, Route 1121 was extended north to intersect it, becoming a more linear route between the old and new highways. The route remained in this form until the 1955 Louisiana Highway renumbering.

=== Post-1955 route history ===
LA 54 was created in 1955 as a direct renumbering of State Route 1121.

La 54—From a junction with La 44 at or near Garyville to a junction with La-US 61.

— 1955 legislative route description

At this time, the route still ran through the center of Garyville. From an intersection with LA 44 and South Church Street, 0.8 miles (1.3 km) east of the present southern terminus, LA 54 proceeded north to Anthony F. Monica Street. It then made a jog onto North Church Street and continued to Museums Street immediately north of the Canadian National (formerly the Illinois Central) railroad crossing. Here it made a second jog onto Garyville Northern Street (also known as Old Highway 54), joining the current alignment 0.7 miles (1.1 km) south of US 61.

In 1991, LA 54 was relocated onto its current route, a newly constructed highway just to the west of the original route. This removed truck traffic serving the nearby industrial plants from the largely residential area traversed by the old route, which was also narrow and contained several right-angle turns. Large trucks carrying chemicals would reportedly become stuck while navigating the route, creating obstructions to traffic and potential safety hazards.

== Future ==
La DOTD is currently engaged in a program that aims to transfer about 5,000 miles (8,000 km) of state-owned roadways to local governments over the next several years. Under this plan of "right-sizing" the state highway system, the entire route of LA 54 is proposed for deletion as it does not meet a significant interurban travel function.

== Major intersections ==
The entire highway is in Garyville, St. John the Baptist Parish.

mi	km	Destinations	Notes
0.0	0.0	LA 44 – Garyville, Mt. Airy	Southern terminus
2.3	3.7	US 61 (Airline Highway) – New Orleans, Baton Rouge	Northern terminus
1.000 mi = 1.609 km; 1.000 km = 0.621 mi
