= Louisiana State Route 7 =

State Route 7

Route information
- Maintained by Louisiana DOTD
- Existed: 1924–1955

Section 1
- Length: 110.80 mi (178.32 km)
- West end: Texas state line near Deweyville
- East end: End state maintenance at Atchafalaya River

Section 2
- Length: 144.50 mi (232.55 km)
- West end: US 190 in Lottie at Morganza Spillway
- East end: MS 35 at Mississippi state line

Location
- Country: United States
- State: Louisiana

Highway system
- Louisiana State Highway System; Interstate; US; State; Scenic

Louisiana State Route 7 (LA 7) was one of the 98 original state highways that were established in 1924. It was split into two separate segments, with the western section running in a west to east direction for 110.80 miles (178.32 km), spanning from Deweyville to the Atchafalaya River. The eastern section ran for 144.50 miles (232.55 km) from Lottie to the Mississippi state line, in a west to east direction.

== Route description ==
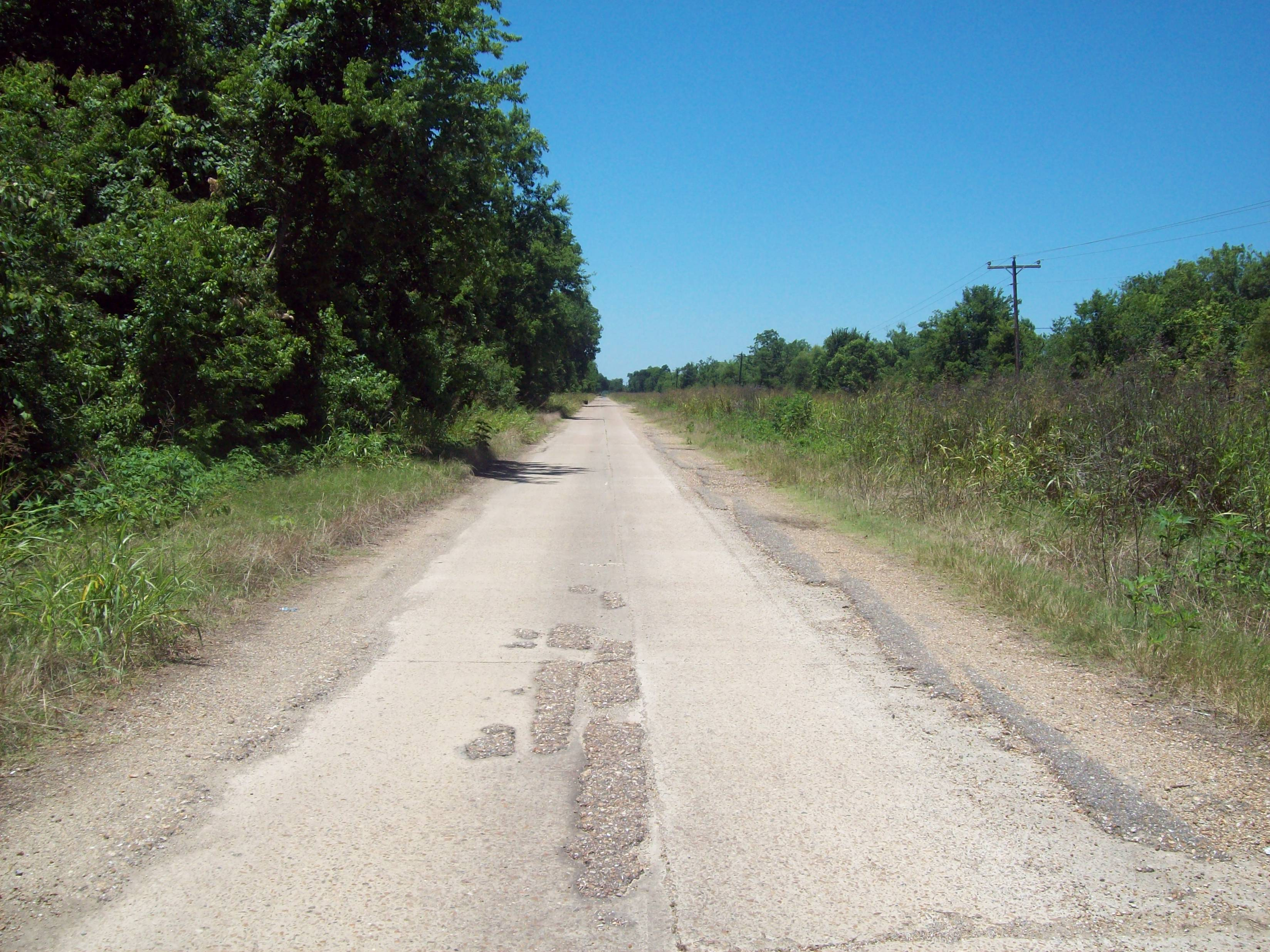
Old concrete pavement on abandoned stretch of LA 7, between US 71 and Krotz Springs

=== Legislative Highway Report ===
Beginning on the Mississippi State Line north of Angie through Bogalusa, Covington, Hammond, Albany, Holden, Livingston, Walker, Denham Springs, Baton Rouge, Port Allen, Rosedale, Livonia, Krotz Springs, Port Barre, Opelousas, Eunice, Elton, Kinder, Fulton, De Quincy, Starks, thence to Texas line at or near Deweyville, Texas. - 1924 Louisiana Legislative Route Description

=== Texas to Krotz Springs ===
LA 7 began at the Texas state line near Deweyville, crossing the Sabine River on a swing bridge. It ran in a straight line along a railroad through the western part of the state, meeting LA 42/US 171 in Ragley and LA 24/US 165 in Kinder before entering Opelousas. LA 7 met LA 5 in Opelousas, which carried US 167, before meeting US 71 and ending in downtown Krotz Springs.

=== Lottie to Mississippi ===
LA 7 was sliced in half with the opening of the Morganza Spillway in the same way that LA 1 was split in half with the opening of the Bonnet Carre Spillway. LA 7 followed the railroad to Livonia, where it met LA 1 and the two were paired to Port Allen. After crossing the Mississippi River in Port Allen, LA 1 turned to the south in Baton Rouge, while LA 7 picked up US 61 and US 190.

US 61 split from LA 7 at a traffic circle, with LA 7 carrying US 190 through the Florida Parishes. US 190 was split from LA 7 in Hammond, where LA 7 met LA 33/US 51. US 190 was paired with US 51 until the 1960s, when US 190 was shifted onto the old LA 7 alignment. LA 7 then passed through Covington and Bogalusa before ending at the Mississippi state line.

=== Auxiliary routes of LA 7 ===
- LA 7-X, covering the multiple special routes of LA 7.

== Major intersections ==
Parish	Location	mi	km	Destinations	Notes
Calcasieu		0.0	0.0	TX 12	Western terminus
Beauregard	Ragley	34.8	56.0	US 171 / US 190 west / SR 42 – Deridder, Lake Charles	Begin concurrency with US 190
Allen	Kinder	58.2	93.7	US 171 / SR 24 – Oakdale, TO US 90	
Jefferson Davis	Elton	67.4	108.5	SR 7-D	
Jefferson Davis	Elton	68.8	110.7	SR 7-D / SR 25 – Oberlin, Jennings	
Saint Landry		81.0	130.4	SR 7-E	
Saint Landry		84.7	136.3	SR 7-H	
Saint Landry	Opelousas	89.7	144.4	SR 40 – Church Point	
Saint Landry	Opelousas	90.3	145.3	SR 22 – Ville Platte	
Saint Landry	Opelousas	90.7	146.0	US 167 / SR 5 – Washington, Lafayette	
Saint Landry	Opelousas	91.1	146.6	SR 25 – Arnaudville	
Saint Landry		107.5	173.0	US 71 north – Alexandria	Southern terminus of US 71
Saint Landry	Krotz Springs	109.7	176.5	US 190 east – Baton Rouge	End concurrency with US 190
Saint Landry	Krotz Springs	110.8	178.3	End state maintenance	Eastern terminus
Gap in route
Pointe Coupee	Lottie	0.0	0.0	US 190 (Airline Highway)	Western terminus
Pointe Coupee	Livonia	3.1	5.0	SR 1 north – Melville	Begin concurrency with LA 1
Iberville	Rosedale	14.5	23.3	SR 65 – Grosse Tete, Plaquemine	
West Baton Rouge		19.5	31.4	SR 73 – New Roads	
West Baton Rouge	Port Allen	28.0	45.1	SR 30 – New Roads	
West Baton Rouge	Port Allen	31.4	50.5	SR 30 – Plaquemine	
West Baton Rouge	Port Allen	31.5	50.7	Toll ferry to Baton Rouge	
East Baton Rouge	Baton Rouge	32.5	52.3	SR 1 south – Gonzales	End concurrency with LA 1
East Baton Rouge	Baton Rouge	33.8	54.4	US 61 north / US 190 west / SR 3 north	Begin concurrency with US 61/190
East Baton Rouge	Baton Rouge	35.6	57.3	SR 37 – Greenwell Springs	
East Baton Rouge	Baton Rouge	38.2	61.5	US 61 south – Gonzales	End concurrency with US 61
East Baton Rouge		44.2	71.1	SR 7-D (Old Hammond Highway)	
Livingston	Denham Springs	45.7	73.5	SR 7-E east (South River Rd.)	
Livingston	Denham Springs	48.0	77.2	SR 7-E west (Centerville St.)	
Livingston		49.6	79.8	SR 7-F east	
Livingston	Walker	53.0	85.3	SR 7-F west	
Livingston	Albany	69.7	112.2	SR 46 to SR 7-D – Greensburg, Springfield	
Tangipahoa	Hammond	75.7	121.8	US 51 north / SR 33 north / SR 7-D west – Kentwood	Begin concurrency with US 51/LA 33
Tangipahoa	Hammond	77.0	123.9	US 51 south / US 190 east / SR 33 south – Ponchatoula	End concurrency with US 51/US 190/LA 33
Tangipahoa	Hammond	78.0	125.5	SR 7-E east	
Saint Tammany	Covington	99.5	160.1	SR 34 north – Folsom	Begin concurrency with LA 34
Saint Tammany	Covington	100.0	160.9	SR 34 south – Mandeville	End concurrency with LA 34
Saint Tammany	Covington	100.2	161.3	SR 58 – Abita Springs	
Washington	Bogalusa	128.3	206.5	SR 35 – Franklinton	Begin concurrency with LA 35
Washington	Bogalusa	128.6	207.0	SR 35 – Poplarville, Miss.	Begin concurrency with LA 35
Washington		144.5	232.6	MS 35 – Columbia	Eastern terminus
1.000 mi = 1.609 km; 1.000 km = 0.621 mi
