= Robeline Methodist Church =

Historic church in Louisiana, United States

- U.S. National Register of Historic Places
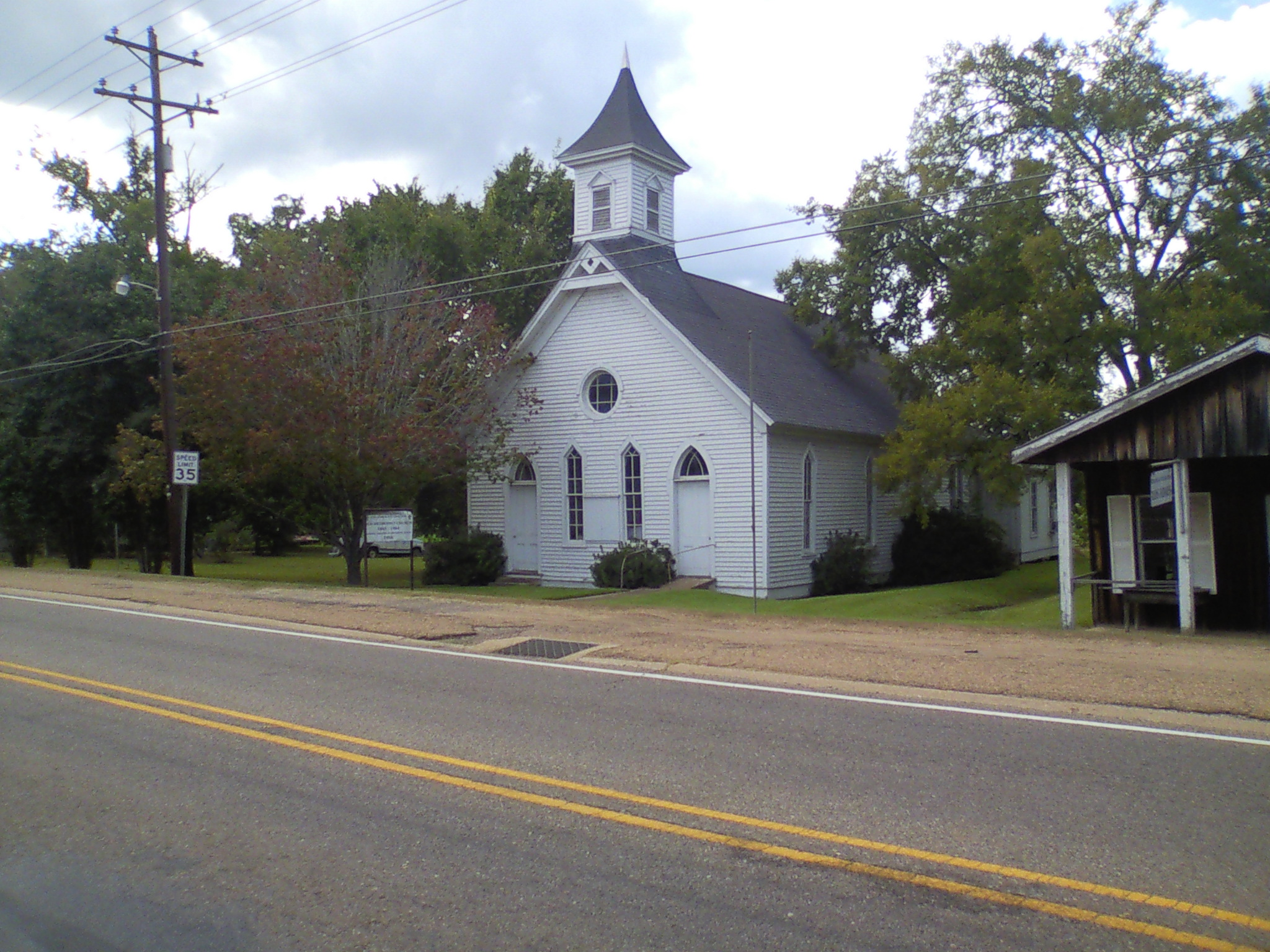

- Location within Louisiana Location within the United States
- Location: Texas St. (LA 6), Robeline, Louisiana
- Coordinates: 31°41′23″N 93°18′18″W
- Area: 0.3 acres (0.12 ha)
- Built: 1883
- Architectural style: Gothic Revival
- NRHP reference No.: 88000113
- Added to NRHP: February 11, 1988

The Robeline Methodist Church is a historic Methodist church on Texas Street (Louisiana Highway 6) in Robeline, Louisiana.

It was built in 1883 in Gothic Revival style and was added to the National Register of Historic Places in 1988.

It was deemed locally significant as the only example of a Gothic Revival church in Natchitoches Parish.
