= Louisiana State Route 1 =

State Route 1

Route information
- Maintained by Louisiana DOTD
- Length: 452.71 mi (728.57 km)
- Existed: 1924–1955

Major junctions
- South end: End state maintenance south of Pointe a la Hache
- SR 32 at Poydras; SR 2 / SR 33 in New Orleans; US 51 / SR 53 at Laplace; US 71 / US 190 / SR 3 / SR 7 in Baton Rouge; US 165 / SR 14 in Alexandria; US 84 / SR 6 at Clarence; US 171 / SR 42 at Mansfield; US 79 / US 80 / SR 4 at Shreveport
- North end: US 80 at Texas state line

Location
- Country: United States
- State: Louisiana

Highway system
- Louisiana State Highway System; Interstate; US; State; Scenic

Louisiana State Route 1 (LA 1) was one of the 98 original state highways that were established in 1924. It was signed for the Jefferson Highway, an auto trail that ran from New Orleans to Winnipeg. LA 1 curved through the entire state, spanning from Shreveport through Alexandria and Baton Rouge to New Orleans, ending south of Pointe a la Hache. It was renumbered for the most part as US 71 and US 171.

== Route description ==
Beginning at a point on the Texas State Line, near Waskom, through Greenwood, Shreveport, Grand Cane, Mansfield, Sodus, Belmont, Marthaville, Robeline, Natchitoches, Montgomery, Colfax, ALexandria, Lecompte, Bunkie, Melville, Rosedale, Port Allen, Baton Rouge, Hope Villa, Burnside, Convent, Kenner, Shrewsbury, Protection Levee at South Claiborne Avenue, New Orleans, Louisiana, South Claiborne Avenue both sides to Canal Street, North Claiborne Avenue both sides to Poland Avenue, St. Claude Avenue, both sides to St. Bernard Parish Line, Mereaux, Violet, Poydras, Dalcour, Phoenix, Point-a-la-hache to Fort St. Philip. - 1924 Louisiana Legislative Route Description

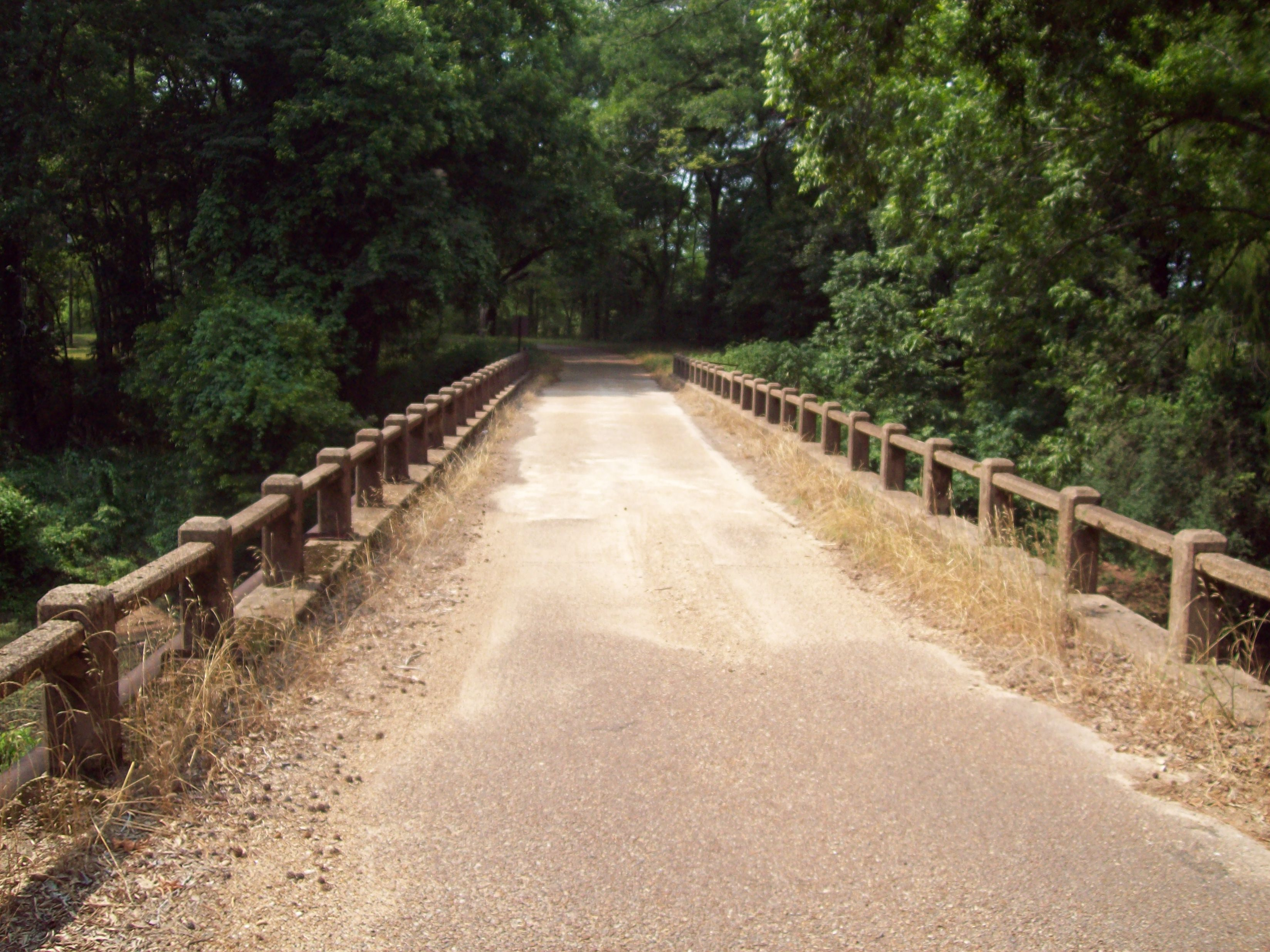
Old LA 1 bridge near Colfax

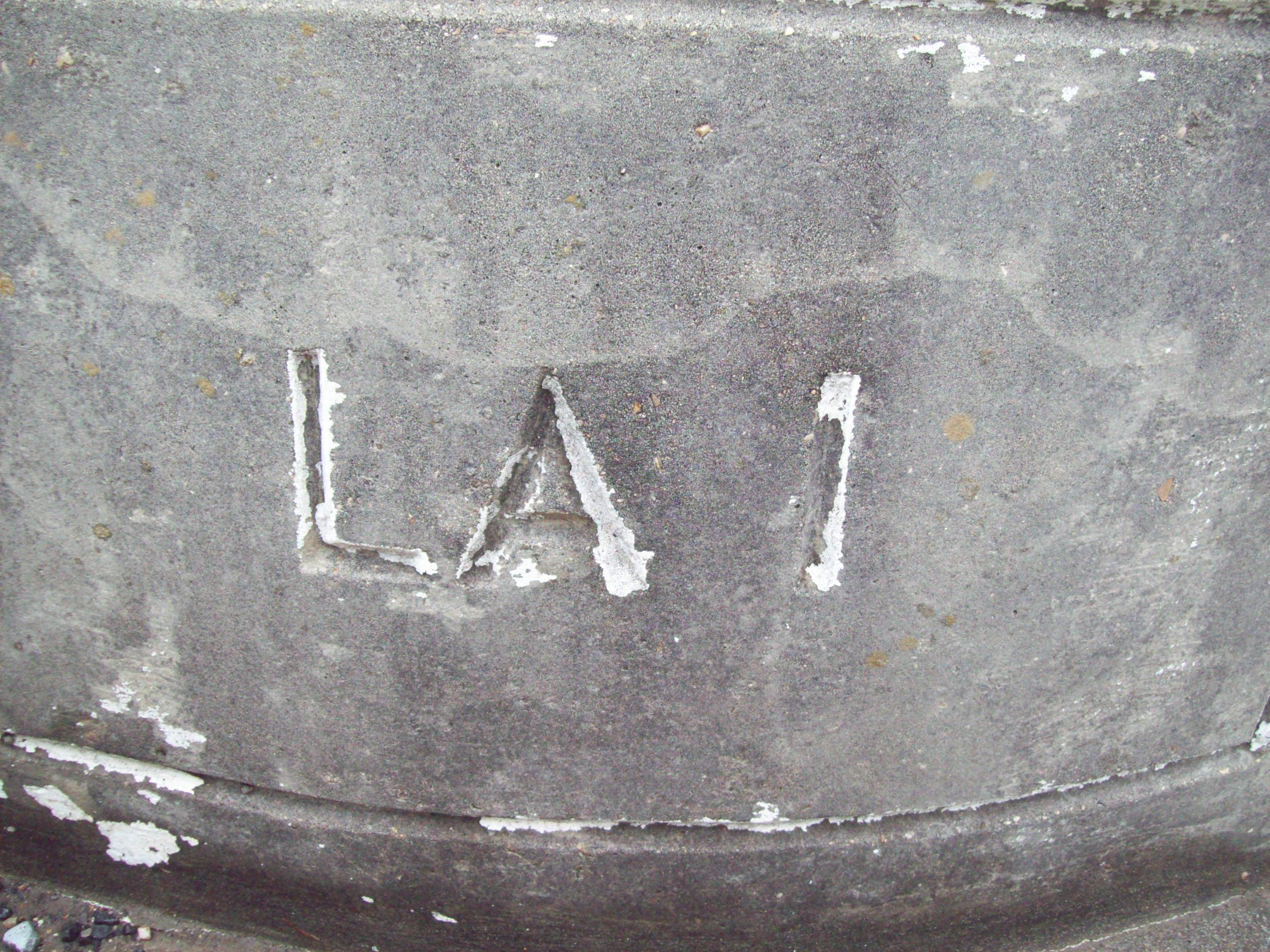
Bridge on current LA 76 stamped with LA 1 for the old alignment

As the successor to the Jefferson Highway, LA 1 started a little further south than the Jefferson Highway, but was the same route, more or less. LA 1 began in Pointe-a-la-Hache, continuing north through small communities, making its way to New Orleans. The route description from New Orleans north is as follows:

From the southern terminus at Common Street, LA 1 followed St. Charles Avenue, Canal Street, City Park Avenue, and Metairie Road into Jefferson Parish. Leaving New Orleans, LA 1 followed Metairie Road, Shrewsbury Road, and Jefferson Highway to Kenner.

From Kenner to Geismar, LA 1 followed alongside the east bank levee of the Mississippi River which, due to various sections of levee being relocated during the 1920s and 1930s, is often a significant distance removed from the modern River Road. Also, a two-mile section between Norco and Montz was eliminated in 1935 when the parallel Airline Highway bridge across the Bonnet Carré Spillway was opened. Portions of LA 1 at Reserve and Gramercy are still known as Jefferson Highway to this day.

From Geismar to Baton Rouge, the route followed what is known as Old Jefferson Highway to downtown Baton Rouge. The original routing through downtown Baton Rouge followed Claycut Road, South Acadian Thruway, Government Street, 19th Street, and North Street to the former Mississippi River ferry landing to Port Allen.

From Port Allen to Alexandria, LA 1 used Court Street, North Jefferson Avenue, and Rosedale Road through Port Allen, then along Rosedale Road to Rosedale, Ravenswood, and then to Red Cross. LA 1 crossed the Atchafalaya River by ferry to Melville and continued on to Lebeau. It used the current route of US 71 to Bunkie, with a short section over a one-lane truss bridge that was bypassed in the mid-1930s. North of Cheneyville, it used US 71 and parts of some bypassed roads to Chambers, then Old Baton Rouge Highway to Alexandria.

In Alexandria and Pineville, LA 1 used Jefferson Hwy., Lee Street, Main Street, and Murray Street through Alexandria, then LA 1 crossed the Red River on a now-demolished bridge at the foot of Murray Street into Pineville, then Main Street and Military Highway, Jefferson Highway, and US 71 (Shreveport Highway) through Pineville.

North of Pineville, LA 1 used US 71 and Shreveport Highway. (Stainaker Street is a small, severed portion of the original route near the junction of US 71 and LA 3225.) Numerous curves were straightened along the route, including a bypassed route through Colfax. North of Colfax, LA 1 followed US 71 north to Clarence, then over on LA 6 to Robeline, then on LA 1 to Belmont, via Old Jefferson Road north of Pelican) to Mansfield, following Old Jefferson Highway into town.

US 171 carried LA 1 to Shreveport, via Old Jefferson Road through Stonewall and Old Mansfield Road through Keithville. Once through Shreveport, LA 1 used US 79-US 80 (Greenwood Road) to Greenwood Road, then US 80 (Texas Avenue) across the state line toward Waskom, Texas.

== Major intersections (Poydras to Melville) ==
Parish	Location	mi	km	Destinations	Notes
Plaquemines		0.0	0.0	End state maintenance	Southern terminus
Plaquemines	Pointe à la Hache	4.7	7.6	Free ferry to SR 31	Southernmost ferry on Mississippi River
Saint Bernard	Poydras	38.1	61.3	SR 32	To Shell Beach; LA 62
Saint Bernard	Chalmette	44.2	71.1	SR 61	To US 90
Orleans	New Orleans	50.6	81.4	US 61 / US 90 / SR 2 east	End of US 61
Orleans	New Orleans	51.8	83.4	SR 2 west	
Jefferson	Metairie	58.5	94.1	US 90 west	Via Huey P. Long Bridge
Saint Charles	Destrehan	72.4	116.5	Free ferry to SR 30	
Saint Charles	Norco	78.9	127.0	Break in highway for Bonnet Carré Spillway	Detour north to US 61
Saint John the Baptist	Laplace	83.7	134.7	US 51 / SR 53 to SR 33	Follow US 51 to LA 33
Saint James	Gramercy	98.5	158.5	Toll ferry to SR 30	Ferry to Vacherie
Ascension		119.7	192.6	SR 54	
Ascension	Burnside	120.6	194.1	SR 88 – Gonzales	
Ascension	Darrow	124.4	200.2	Toll ferry to SR 77	Ferry to Donaldsonville
Ascension	Geismar	133.1	214.2	SR 63 – Carville	
Ascension	Dutchtown	136.5	219.7	SR 46 – Gonzales	
Ascension	Prairieville	141.2	227.2	US 61 (Airline Highway)	
Ascension	Prairieville	142.4	229.2	SR 87 – Port Vincent	
East Baton Rouge		149.8	241.1	US 61 (Airline Highway) – Gonzales	US 61 splits to south
East Baton Rouge		150.9	242.9	US 61 (Airline Highway) – Baton Rouge	US 61 splits to north
East Baton Rouge	Baton Rouge	153.4	246.9	SR 7-D (Old Hammond Highway)	
East Baton Rouge	Baton Rouge	158.8	255.6	SR 63 (Nicholson Drive)	
East Baton Rouge	Baton Rouge	160.0	257.5	US 61 (Florida Blvd.) / US 190 / SR 7	
East Baton Rouge	Baton Rouge	160.2	257.8	SR 37 (Florida Blvd.)	
East Baton Rouge	Baton Rouge	160.4	258.1	Toll ferry to SR 30	Ferry to Port Allen
West Baton Rouge	Port Allen	160.8	258.8	SR 30 – Plaquemine	
West Baton Rouge		164.2	264.3	SR 30 – New Roads	
West Baton Rouge		172.7	277.9	SR 73 (Poydras Bayou Rd.) – New Roads	
Iberville	Rosedale	177.7	286.0	SR 65 – Grosse Tete	To Plaquemine
Pointe Coupee	Livonia	189.1	304.3	SR 7 – Krotz Springs	Orphaned segment of LA 7
Pointe Coupee	Livonia	189.3	304.6	US 190 (Airline Highway)	
Pointe Coupee		203.2	327.0	SR 41 – Morganza	Entering Morganza Spillway
Pointe Coupee		207.8	334.4	Free ferry	Ferry to Melville
1.000 mi = 1.609 km; 1.000 km = 0.621 mi

== Major intersections (Melville to Natchitoches) ==
Parish	Location	mi	km	Destinations	Notes
Saint Landry		222.4	357.9	US 71 / SR 27 – Washington	US 71 South to US 190
Saint Landry		231.9	373.2	SR 92 – Ville Platte	
Avoyelles	Bunkie	242.0	389.5	SR 5 south – Opelousas	
Avoyelles	Bunkie	242.2	389.8	SR 5 north – Marksville	
Avoyelles	Bunkie	242.8	390.7	SR 1-D	
Rapides	Meeker	255.9	411.8	US 167 / SR 26 – Ville Platte	
Rapides	Lecompte	258.8	416.5	SR 24 – Forest Hill	
Rapides		265.2	426.8	SR 1-D	
Rapides	Alexandria	271.8	437.4	SR 14 (Lee Street)	Begin business US 71-167
Rapides	Alexandria	273.1	439.5	US 165 south – Lake Charles	
Rapides	Alexandria	275.1	442.7	SR 21	
Rapides	Alexandria	276.1	444.3	SR 20	End business US 71-167
Rapides	Pineville	279.1	449.2	US 165 north / SR 5 south / SR 14-D	
Rapides		285.5	459.5	US 167 north – Winnfield, Ruston	
Grant		299.8	482.5	SR 19 – Colfax, Pollock	
Grant		305.3	491.3	SR 5 north – Winnfield	Old alignment of US 167
Natchitoches	Clarence	327.7	527.4	SR 1-D	
Natchitoches	Clarence	331.5	533.5	US 84 / SR 6 / SR 10 – Coushatta, Winnfield	
Natchitoches		334.4	538.2	SR 10-D – Campti	
Natchitoches	Natchitoches	339.0	545.6	SR 20 – Shreveport, Alexandria	
Natchitoches		348.2	560.4	SR 39 – Leesville	
Natchitoches	Robeline	354.6	570.7	SR 6 west / SR 75 – Many, Provencal	
Sabine	Belmont	369.4	594.5	SR 51 – Many	
Desoto	Mansfield	397.4	639.6	US 84 east / SR 9 east – Coushatta	
Desoto	Mansfield	398.3	641.0	US 84 east / US 171 / SR 9 east to SR 42 – Coushatta, Leesville	
Desoto	Gloster	413.6	665.6	SR 38 – Longstreet	
Caddo	Shreveport	435.0	700.1	US 79 / US 80 / SR 4	
Caddo	Greenwood	447.8	720.7	US 79	
1.000 mi = 1.609 km; 1.000 km = 0.621 mi
