= Rayfield Fisher =

American politician (1940–2014)

Rayfield Fisher (August 30, 1940 – October 17, 2014) was a lawyer and state legislator in Indiana. He was born in Marthaville, Louisiana. He served in the U.S. Air Force. A Democrat, he was elected in 1976 and 1978, succeeding Katie Hall in office.

Fisher was born in Marthaville, Louisiana and graduated from Purdue University. He served as a programmer and systems analyst for the U.S. Air Force. He lived in Gary, Indiana.
