= Bayou Pierre =

Bayou Pierre may refer to:

- Bayou Pierre (Louisiana)
- Bayou Pierre (Mississippi)
- Bayou Pierre settlement in the Natchez District
