= Grand Ecore, Louisiana =

Grand Ecore
- Unincorporated community
- Location within the state of Louisiana
- Coordinates: 31°49′06″N 93°05′15″W
- Country: United States
- State: Louisiana
- Parish: Natchitoches
- Elevation: 147 ft (45 m)
- Time zone: UTC-6 (Central (CST))
  - Summer (DST): UTC-5 (CDT)
- ZIP code: 71457
- GNIS feature ID: 548998

Grand Ecore is an unincorporated community in Natchitoches Parish, Louisiana, United States. It is located on LA-6, north of the city of Natchitoches on the Red River of the South.

The community is part of the Natchitoches Micropolitan Statistical Area.

The US Army Corps of Engineers operates a visitor center at Grand Ecore with panamoramic views from the bluff 80 feet above the Red River. The location was site of a Civil War site. The area is known for its colonial history, civil war sites, hiking and fishing tournaments.

== History ==
Since time immemorial, the Caddo Indians settled the lands around Grand Ecore. In 1718, the Brossart brothers brought out a colony from Lyon, France to settle the area. The first to receive land grants and to settle among the Natchitoches Indians (a Caddoan tribe) were Louis Latham, who settled near Las Tres Llonas, and Pierre and Julian Beson who settled at Grand Ecore. Over the next 70 years, the French then the Spanish colonial governments issued land grants to Bossier, Grappe, Prudehomme, Brevelle, and Metoyer. These families operated vast plantations along the Red River and Cane River. By the turn of the century, Dr. John Sibley bought Grand Ecore and 500 acres on the opposing bank of the Red River. Fort Selden on Bayou Pierre, above Grand Ecore, was established in 1820 by companies of the 7th Infantry from Arkansas. They were Arkansas troops, commanded by Lieut. Colonel Zachary Taylor. The 7th Infantry was withdrawn in 1822 from that position to a new site, subsequently known as Fort Jesup.
