= Keegan House (Robeline, Louisiana) =

Historic house in Louisiana, United States

- U.S. National Register of Historic Places
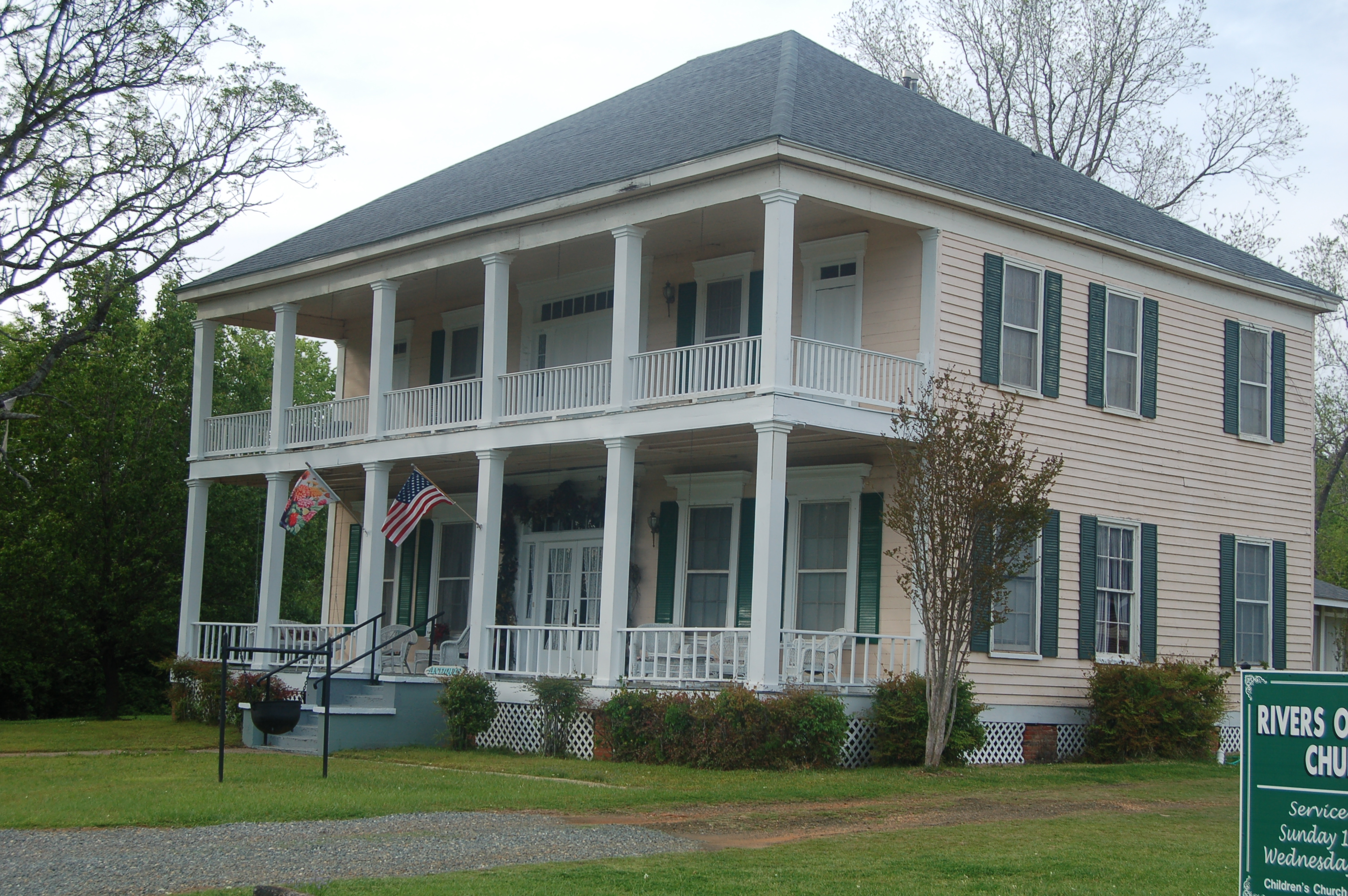
- Keegan House

- Location within Louisiana Location within the United States
- Nearest city: Robeline, Louisiana
- Coordinates: 31°41′35″N 93°18′13″W
- Built: 1850
- Architectural style: Colonial Revival
- NRHP reference No.: 95000853
- Added to NRHP: 1995-07-14

The Keegan House is a historic 1850 Colonial Revival plantation style house in Robeline Natchitoches Parish, Louisiana. The house was formerly part of the Elzey (possibly Ellzey) Plantation.

The house is now the Keegan Cook House B & B at 143 Chaplin Loop, Robeline, LA 71469.
