= Louisiana State Route 7-X =

Suffixed routes of State Route 7

Highway system
- Louisiana State Highway System; Interstate; US; State; Scenic

Louisiana State Route 7 had multiple suffixed routes, designating bypassed alignments of the highway. They are listed below in order from west to east.

== Elton (LA 7-D) ==
State Route 7-D
- Location: Elton
- Length: 1.40 mi (2.25 km)
- Existed: 1955

Louisiana State Route 7-D (LA 7-D) spanned 1.90 miles (3.06 km) from west to east and was known as Yoakum Street and Kennedy Road. It served as the older alignment of LA 7 through Elton.

=== Junction list ===
The entire highway is in Elton, Jefferson Davis Parish.

mi	km	Destinations	Notes
0.0	0.0	US 190 / SR 7	
1.4	2.3	SR 25 – Oberlin	
1.000 mi = 1.609 km; 1.000 km = 0.621 mi

== Lawtell (LA 7-E) ==
State Route 7-E
- Location: Lawtell
- Length: 3.90 mi (6.28 km)
- Existed: 1955

Louisiana State Route 7-E (LA 7-E) spanned 3.90 miles (6.28 km) from west to east and was known as Summer Road. It served as the older alignment of LA 7 near Lawtell.

=== Junction list ===
The entire highway is in Lawtell, Saint Landry Parish.

mi	km	Destinations	Notes
0.0	0.0	US 190 / SR 7	
3.9	6.3	US 190 / SR 7	
1.000 mi = 1.609 km; 1.000 km = 0.621 mi

== Opelousas (LA 7-H) ==
State Route 7-H
- Location: Opelousas
- Length: 2.10 mi (3.38 km)
- Existed: 1955

Louisiana State Route 7-H (LA 7-H) spanned 2.10 miles (3.38 km) from west to east. It served as the older alignment of LA 7 near Opelousas.

=== Junction list ===
The entire highway is in Opelousas, Saint Landry Parish.

mi	km	Destinations	Notes
0.0	0.0	US 190 / SR 7	
1.2	1.9	US 190 / SR 7	
2.1	3.4	End state maintenance	
1.000 mi = 1.609 km; 1.000 km = 0.621 mi

== Krotz Springs (LA 7-D) ==
State Route 7-D
- Location: Krotz Springs
- Length: 1.20 mi (1.93 km)
- Existed: 1944

Louisiana State Route 7-D (LA 7-D) spanned 1.20 miles (1.93 km) from west to east. It served as the older alignment of LA 7 east of Krotz Springs, being bypassed by a newer alignment through the Morganza Spillway. It last appeared on maps in 1944.

=== Junction list ===
The entire highway is in East Krotz Springs, Pointe Coupee Parish.

mi	km	Destinations	Notes
0.0	0.0	Begin state maintenance at railroad bridge	
3.9	6.3	End state maintenance in Morganza Spillway	
1.000 mi = 1.609 km; 1.000 km = 0.621 mi

== Baton Rouge (LA 7-D) ==
State Route 7-D
- Location: Baton Rouge
- Length: 7.40 mi (11.91 km)
- Existed: 1955

Louisiana State Route 7-D (LA 7-D) spanned 7.40 miles (11.91 km) from west to east and was known as Old Hammond Highway. It served as the older alignment of LA 7 through Baton Rouge, being bypassed by the newer Florida Boulevard project. The road is still known as Old Hammond Highway to this day.

=== Junction list ===
The entire highway is in Baton Rouge, East Baton Rouge Parish.

mi	km	Destinations	Notes
0.0	0.0	SR 1 (Jefferson Highway)	
1.7	2.7	US 61 (Airline Highway)	
7.4	11.9	US 190 / SR 7 – Denham Springs	
1.000 mi = 1.609 km; 1.000 km = 0.621 mi

== Denham Springs (LA 7-E) ==
State Route 7-E
- Location: Denham Springs
- Length: 1.70 mi (2.74 km)
- Existed: 1955

Louisiana State Route 7-E (LA 7-E) spanned 1.70 miles (2.74 km) from west to east through the town of Denham Springs. It served as the older alignment of LA 7.

=== Junction list ===
The entire highway is in Denham Springs, Livingston Parish.

mi	km	Destinations	Notes
0.0	0.0	US 190 / SR 7 – Baton Rouge	
1.7	2.7	US 190 / SR 7 – Walker	
1.000 mi = 1.609 km; 1.000 km = 0.621 mi

== Walker (LA 7-F) ==
State Route 7-F
- Location: Walker
- Length: 3.50 mi (5.63 km)
- Existed: 1955

Louisiana State Route 7-F (LA 7-F) spanned 3.50 miles (5.63 km) from west to east through the town of Walker. It served as the older alignment of LA 7.

=== Junction list ===
The entire highway is in Walker, Livingston Parish.

mi	km	Destinations	Notes
0.0	0.0	US 190 / SR 7 – Denham Springs	
3.5	5.6	US 190 / SR 7 – Livingston	
1.000 mi = 1.609 km; 1.000 km = 0.621 mi

== Albany to Hammond (LA 7-D) ==
State Route 7-D
- Location: none
- Length: 6.10 mi (9.82 km)
- Existed: 1955

Louisiana State Route 7-E (LA 7-E) spanned 6.10 miles (9.82 km) from west to east to connect LA 7 with the city of Hammond. It served as the older alignment of LA 7 for the most part, with LA 366 picking up another old segment.

=== Junction list ===
Parish	Location	mi	km	Destinations	Notes
Livingston		0.0	0.0	SR 46 – Springfield	
Tangipahoa	Hammond	6.1	9.8	US 190 / SR 7 – Albany	
1.000 mi = 1.609 km; 1.000 km = 0.621 mi

== Hammond to Robert (LA 7-E) ==
State Route 7-E
- Location: none
- Length: 4.80 mi (7.72 km)
- Existed: 1955

Louisiana State Route 7-E (LA 7-E) spanned 4.80 miles (7.72 km) from west to east from the town of Hammond to the community of Robert. It served as the older alignment of LA 7.

=== Junction list ===
The entire highway is in Tangipahoa Parish.

Location	mi	km	Destinations	Notes
Hammond	0.0	0.0	SR 7	
	4.8	7.7	SR 7	
1.000 mi = 1.609 km; 1.000 km = 0.621 mi
