= Northup Trail =

The Northup Trail is a Louisiana Scenic Byway that follows several different state highways, primarily:

- LA 27 and LA 107 from southwest of Bunkie to Marksville; and
- US 71 from Bunkie to Alexandria.
