= List of original highways in Louisiana (51–100) =

The following is a list of state highways in the U.S. state of Louisiana designated in the 51-100 range prior to the 1955 Louisiana Highway renumbering.

== Louisiana State Route 51 ==
State Route 51
- Existed: 1921–1955

Louisiana State Route 51 existed from 1921 to 1955.

== Louisiana State Route 52 ==
State Route 52
- Location: DeRidder–Oberlin
- Length: 33.5 mi (53.9 km)
- Existed: 1921–1955

Louisiana State Route 52 ran 33.5 miles (53.9 km) in a general east–west direction from US 171/US 190/State Route 42 southeast of DeRidder, Beauregard Parish to the junction of US 165/State Route 24 and State Route 25 in Oberlin, Allen Parish.

== Louisiana State Route 53 ==
State Route 53
- Location: LaPlace–Frenier
- Length: 3.6 mi (5.8 km)
- Existed: 1921–1955

Louisiana State Route 53 ran 3.6 miles (5.8 km) in a north–south direction from State Route 1 in LaPlace to the junction of State Route 33 and State Route 1141 in Frenier, St. John the Baptist Parish. Most of the route was concurrent with US 51.

== Louisiana State Route 54 ==
State Route 54
- Existed: 1921–1955

Louisiana State Route 54 existed from 1921 to 1955.

== Louisiana State Route 55 ==
State Route 55
- Location: Caddo Parish
- Length: 27.1 mi (43.6 km)
- Existed: 1921–1955

Louisiana State Route 55 ran 27.1 miles (43.6 km) in a north–south direction from the junction of US 79/US 80/State Route 4 in Shreveport, Caddo Parish to the Arkansas state line north of Ida. The route was entirely concurrent with US 71. The above mileage reflects a gap in the route between Dixie and Gilliam, as that portion of the highway was being relocated at the time of the 1955 Louisiana Highway renumbering.

== Louisiana State Route 56 ==
State Route 56
- Location: New Iberia–Lake Dauterive
- Length: 15.1 mi (24.3 km)
- Existed: 1921–1955

Louisiana State Route 56 ran 15.1 miles (24.3 km) in a general east–west direction from US 90/State Route 2 in New Iberia to a dead end at Lake Dauterive in Iberia Parish.

Much of the route became a portion of LA 86 in the 1955 renumbering; the section from Loreauville to Lake Dauterive became LA 3242.

== Louisiana State Route 57 ==
State Route 57
- Location: Marksville–Jena
- Length: 38.9 mi (62.6 km)
- Existed: 1921–1955

Louisiana State Route 57 ran 38.9 miles (62.6 km) in a general north–south direction, existing as two disconnected sections. The southern portion extended from State Route 5 north of Marksville, Avoyelles Parish to State Route 123 northeast of Holloway, Rapides Parish. The northern portion extended from a dead end at the Little River to the junction of US 84, State Route 6, and State Route 19 in Jena, LaSalle Parish.

SR 57 became a portion of LA 107 in the 1955 renumbering.

== Louisiana State Route 57-D ==
State Route 57-D
- Location: Effie–Pineville
- Length: 19.6 mi (31.5 km)
- Existed: 1921–1955

Louisiana State Route 57-D ran 19.6 miles (31.5 km) in a general east–west direction, branching off of State Route 57 north of Effie, Avoyelles Parish and extending to US 165/State Route 14 in Pineville, Rapides Parish.

SR 57-D became a portion of LA 107 in the 1955 renumbering.

== Louisiana State Route 58 ==
State Route 58
- Existed: 1921–1955

Louisiana State Route 58 existed from 1921 to 1955.

== Louisiana State Route 59 ==
State Route 59
- Location: Louisa-Baldwin
- Existed: 1921–1955

Louisiana State Route 59 existed from 1921 to 1955.

== Louisiana State Route 60 ==
State Route 60
- Location: St. Mary Parish
- Length: 17.3 mi (27.8 km)
- Existed: 1921–1955

Louisiana State Route 60 ran 17.3 miles (27.8 km) in a north–south direction from a dead end at East Cote Blanche Bay to US 90/State Route 2 in Centerville, St. Mary Parish.

SR 60 was renumbered as LA 317 in the 1955 renumbering.

== Louisiana State Route 61 ==
State Route 61
- Location: Chalmette–Eastern New Orleans
- Length: 6.4 mi (10.3 km)
- Existed: 1921–1955

Louisiana State Route 61 ran 6.4 miles (10.3 km) in a north–south direction from State Route 1 in Chalmette, St. Bernard Parish to US 90/State Route 2 in New Orleans, Orleans Parish.

SR 61 was renumbered to LA 47 in the 1955 renumbering.

== Louisiana State Route 62 ==
State Route 62
- Location: St. Bernard Parish
- Length: 7.6 mi (12.2 km)
- Existed: 1921–1955

Louisiana State Route 62 ran 7.6 miles (12.2 km) in a north–south direction from a dead end in Delacroix to State Route 32 west of Yscloskey, St. Bernard Parish.

== Louisiana State Route 63 ==
State Route 63
- Location: Geismar–Baton Rouge
- Length: 26.2 mi (42.2 km)
- Existed: 1921–1955

Louisiana State Route 63 ran 26.2 miles (42.2 km) in a general north–south direction from State Route 1 in Geismar, Ascension Parish to a second junction with State Route 1 in Baton Rouge, East Baton Rouge Parish.

SR 63 was renumbered to LA 30 in the 1955 renumbering.

== Louisiana State Route 64 ==
State Route 64
- Location: Columbia–Rayville
- Length: 33.7 mi (54.2 km)
- Existed: 1921–1955

Louisiana State Route 64 ran 33.7 miles (54.2 km) in a north–south direction from State Route 17 northeast of Columbia, Caldwell Parish to State Route 47 south of Rayville, Richland Parish.

== Louisiana State Route 65 ==
State Route 65
- Existed: 1921–1955

Louisiana State Route 65 existed from 1921 to 1955.

== Louisiana State Route 66 ==
State Route 66
- Existed: 1921–1955

Louisiana State Route 66 existed from 1921 to 1955.

== Louisiana State Route 67 ==
State Route 67
- Location: Foules–Waterproof
- Length: 16.1 mi (25.9 km)
- Existed: 1921–1955

Louisiana State Route 67 ran 16.1 miles (25.9 km) in a general east–west direction in two disconnected segments. The western portion extended from State Route 15 at Foules, Catahoula Parish to a dead end at the Tensas River. The route resumed on the opposite bank of the river in Tensas Parish, extending to US 65/State Route 3 in Waterproof.

== Louisiana State Route 68 ==
State Route 68
- Location: Harrisonburg–Grayson
- Length: 37.9 mi (61.0 km)
- Existed: 1921–1955

Louisiana State Route 68 ran 37.9 miles (61.0 km) in a north–south direction from State Route 18 in Harrisonburg to the junction of US 165/State Route 14 and State Route 110 in Grayson.

== Louisiana State Route 69 ==
State Route 69
- Existed: 1921–1955

Louisiana State Route 69 existed from 1921 to 1955.

== Louisiana State Route 70 ==
State Route 70
- Existed: 1921–1955

Louisiana State Route 70 existed from 1921 to 1955.

== Louisiana State Route 71 ==
State Route 71
- Location: St. Helena Parish-Washington Parish
- Existed: 1921–1955

Louisiana State Route 71 ran in a west–east direction from Chipola to Clifton. SR 71 formerly turned south and overlapped current LA 25 to Franklinton, but this was removed after 1937.

SR 71 became a portion of LA 38 in the 1955 renumbering.

== Louisiana State Route 72 ==
State Route 72
- Location: Avoyelles Parish
- Length: 12.5 mi (20.1 km)
- Existed: 1921–1955

Louisiana State Route 72 ran 12.5 miles (20.1 km) in a general east–west direction from State Route 5 west of Fifth Ward to State Route C-1471 in Mansura, Avoyelles Parish.

SR 72 became a portion of LA 114 in the 1955 renumbering.

== Louisiana State Route 72-D ==
State Route 72-D
- Existed: 1921–1955

Louisiana State Route 72-D was the former routing of SR 72 through Echo Community.

== Louisiana State Route 73 ==
State Route 73
- Location: West Baton Rouge Parish
- Length: 4.8 mi (7.7 km)
- Existed: 1921–1955

Louisiana State Route 73 ran 4.3 miles (6.9 km) in a north–south direction from State Route 1 west of Port Allen to State Route 30 in Erwinville, West Baton Rouge Parish.

== Louisiana State Route 74 ==
State Route 74
- Location: Lindsay-Jackson
- Length: 7.6 mi (12.2 km)
- Existed: 1921–1955

Louisiana State Route 74 ran 7.6 miles (12.2 km) in a north–south direction from SR 3 (now US 61) near Lindsay to SR 35 near Jackson.

The route became a portion of LA 68 in the 1955 renumbering.

== Louisiana State Route 75 ==
State Route 75
- Existed: 1921–1955

Louisiana State Route 75 existed from 1921 to 1955.

== Louisiana State Route 76 ==
State Route 76
- Location: Tensas Parish
- Length: 14.7 mi (23.7 km)
- Existed: 1921–1955

Louisiana State Route 76 ran 14.7 miles (23.7 km) in an east–west direction from State Route 48 southwest of Newlight to State Route C-2171 in Newellton, Tensas Parish.

The route became a portion of LA 4 in the 1955 renumbering.

== Louisiana State Route 77 ==
State Route 77
- Existed: 1921–1955

Louisiana State Route 77 existed from 1921 to 1955.

== Louisiana State Route 78 ==
State Route 78
- Existed: 1921–1955

Louisiana State Route 78 existed from 1921 to 1955.

== Louisiana State Route 79 ==
State Route 79
- Existed: 1921–1955

Louisiana State Route 79 existed from 1921 to 1955.

== Louisiana State Route 80 ==
State Route 80
- Existed: 1921–1955

Louisiana State Route 80 existed from 1921 to 1955.

== Louisiana State Route 81 ==
State Route 81
- Location: Terrebonne Parish
- Length: 7.1 mi (11.4 km)
- Existed: 1921–1955

Louisiana State Route 81 ran 7.1 miles (11.4 km) in a south–north direction from Sea Breeze to Montegut.

The route became the southern portion of LA 55 in the 1955 renumbering.

== Louisiana State Route 82 ==
State Route 82
- Existed: 1921–1955

Louisiana State Route 82 existed from 1921 to 1955.

== Louisiana State Route 83 ==
State Route 83
- Existed: 1921–1955

Louisiana State Route 83 existed from 1921 to 1955.

== Louisiana State Route 84 ==
State Route 58
- Existed: 1921–1955

Louisiana State Route 84 existed from 1921 to 1955.

== Louisiana State Route 85 ==
State Route 85
- Location: Hineston–Forest Hill
- Length: 16.1 mi (25.9 km)
- Existed: 1921–1955

Louisiana State Route 85 ran 16.1 miles (25.9 km) in an east–west direction from State Route 21 in Hineston to US 165/State Route 205 north of Forest Hill, Rapides Parish.

== Louisiana State Route 86 ==
State Route 86
- Location: St. Martinville–Catahoula
- Length: 12.1 mi (19.5 km)
- Existed: 1921–1955

Louisiana State Route 86 ran 12.1 miles (19.5 km) in an east–west direction from St. Martinville to Catahoula.

The route became the eastern portion of LA 96 in the 1955 renumbering.

== Louisiana State Route 87 ==
State Route 87
- Existed: 1921–1955

Louisiana State Route 87 existed from 1921 to 1955.

== Louisiana State Route 88 ==
State Route 58
- Existed: 1921–1955

Louisiana State Route 88 existed from 1921 to 1955.

== Louisiana State Route 89 ==
State Route 58
- Existed: 1921–1955

Louisiana State Route 89 existed from 1921 to 1955.

== Louisiana State Route 90 ==
State Route 90
- Existed: 1921–1955

Louisiana State Route 90 existed from 1921 to 1955.

== Louisiana State Route 91 ==
State Route 91
- Location: Norwood–Slaughter
- Length: 20.3 mi (32.7 km)
- Existed: 1921–1955

Louisiana State Route 91 ran 20.3 miles (32.7 km) in a north–south direction from Norwood to Slaughter.

The route became the northern portion of LA 19 in the 1955 renumbering.

== Louisiana State Route 92 ==
State Route 92
- Location: Morrow–Cottonport
- Length: 24.2 mi (38.9 km)
- Existed: 1921–1955

Louisiana State Route 92 ran 24.2 miles (38.9 km) in a general north–south direction from US 71/State Route 1 in Morrow, St. Landry Parish to State Route 30 in Cottonport, Avoyelles Parish.

SR 92 became a portion of LA 107 in the 1955 renumbering.

== Louisiana State Route 93 ==
State Route 93
- Location: Pointe Coupee Parish
- Length: 12.0 mi (19.3 km)
- Existed: 1921–1955

Louisiana State Route 93 ran 12.0 miles (19.3 km) in a general north–south direction from State Route 30 at Lakeland to a second junction with Route 30 in New Roads, Pointe Coupee Parish.

== Louisiana State Route 94 ==
State Route 94
- Location: Lake Providence
- Length: 4.6 mi (7.4 km)
- Existed: 1921–1955

Louisiana State Route 94 ran 4.6 miles (7.4 km) in a general north–south direction from State Route 1288 north of Lake Providence to State Route 3-D at Highland.

== Louisiana State Route 95 ==
State Route 58
- Existed: 1921–1955

Louisiana State Route 95 existed from 1921 to 1955.

== Louisiana State Route 96 ==
State Route 58
- Existed: 1921–1955

Louisiana State Route 96 existed from 1921 to 1955.

== Louisiana State Route 97 ==
State Route 58
- Existed: 1921–1955

Louisiana State Route 97 existed from 1921 to 1955.

== Louisiana State Route 98 ==
State Route 98
- Location: Holmwood-Lake Arthur
- Length: 37.7 mi (60.7 km)
- Existed: 1921–1955

Louisiana State Route 98 ran 37.7 miles (60.7 km) in a general west–east direction from Holmwood to Lake Arthur.

The route became a portion of LA 14 in the 1955 renumbering.

=== Pre-1955 route numbering ===
In the original Louisiana Highway system in use between 1921 and 1955, the modern LA 14 was part of three separate routes.

==== Western and eastern sections ====
The section from Lake Charles to Holmwood was a small part of State Route 42. Route 42 followed the modern US 171 corridor from Lake Charles as far north as Mansfield in DeSoto Parish. South of Holmwood, it followed the current LA 27 south and west to Cameron on the Gulf of Mexico. The portion of Route 42 now followed by LA 14 remained the same during the pre-1955 era.

The eastern half of LA 14 from Lake Arthur to New Iberia was also part of a much longer pre-1955 route, State Route 25. It was the middle portion of a U-shaped route that also included the modern corridor of LA 26 to Oberlin on the west end and LA 31 to Opelousas on the east end. The portion of Route 25 now followed by LA 14 had some minor differences in the pre-1955 era. Southeast of the Mermentau River bridge at Lake Arthur, the highway made a jog at LA 717 east onto Cypress Point Road then south onto Clesmae Road to rejoin the present alignment. On the east side of Gueydan, the highway turned south from Main Street onto 13th Street, then east onto Maree Michel Road, and south onto Hair Road to rejoin the current alignment. This portion of the route was re-aligned by the time of the 1955 Louisiana Highway renumbering. Further east, the pre-1955 route generally followed the current business routes through Abbeville and Erath. Sharp turns have been smoothed out over several portions of the route, most notably in Iberia Parish, where short segments of the original route bypassed during the 1920s are now local roads known as Old LA 25 Road.

== Louisiana State Route 99 ==
State Route 99
- Existed: 1921–1955

Louisiana State Route 99 existed from 1921 to 1955.

== Louisiana State Route 100 ==
State Route 100
- Existed: 1921–1955

Louisiana State Route 100 existed from 1921 to 1955.
