= Louisiana Highway 6 =

State highway in Louisiana, United States

Louisiana Highway 6

- Route of LA 6 highlighted in red

Route information
- Maintained by Louisiana DOTD
- Length: 54.518 mi (87.738 km)
- Existed: 1955 renumbering–present
- Tourist routes: Louisiana Scenic Byway: Louisiana Colonial Trails

Major junctions
- West end: SH 21 at Texas state line southwest of Many
- US 171 in Many; I-49 in Natchitoches; LA 1 in Natchitoches
- East end: US 71 / US 84 in Clarence

Location
- Country: United States
- State: Louisiana
- Parishes: Sabine, Natchitoches

Highway system
- Louisiana State Highway System; Interstate; US; State; Scenic
← LA 5	→ LA 7

Louisiana Highway 6 (LA 6) is a state highway located in western central Louisiana. It runs 54.52 miles (87.74 km) in an east–west direction from the Texas state line southwest of Many to U.S. Highway 71 (US 71) and U.S. Highway 84 (US 84) in Clarence.

The route connects Many and Natchitoches, the seats of the two parishes it traverses, Sabine and Natchitoches. The bridge over the Toledo Bend Reservoir at the west end of LA 6 provides the only crossing of the state line between US 84 at Logansport, 44 miles (71 km) to the north, and LA 191 west of Leesville, 31 miles (50 km) to the south.

LA 6 is also steeped in history, as it roughly follows the El Camino Real de los Tejas, a National Historic Trail, and passes through Natchitoches, the oldest permanent settlement in the Louisiana Purchase. Its significance as a scenic route has been recognized by its inclusion as part of the Louisiana Colonial Trails, one of the state-designated Louisiana Scenic Byways.

== Route description ==
=== Toledo Bend Reservoir to Natchitoches ===
From the west, LA 6 begins at the Texas state line, continuing the route of Texas State Highway 21 (SH 21) midway across a bridge over the Toledo Bend Reservoir. After heading northeast into Sabine Parish, Louisiana for 2.4 miles (3.9 km), LA 6 reaches land and curves to the east for another 3.6 miles (5.8 km) where it intersects LA 191 south of Zwolle. Continuing eastward for 6.7 miles (10.8 km), LA 6 intersects LA 476 and curves to the northeast toward Many, the parish seat.

LA 6 enters Many on San Antonio Avenue and intersects US 171, which heads northwest to Zwolle and south to Leesville. After passing through the center of town, LA 6 makes a zigzag to the north and east then intersects LA 1217 (Marthaville Road). 3.8 miles (6.1 km) northeast of Many, LA 6 passes near the Fort Jesup State Historic Site, which is served by LA 3118, a short loop off the main road. 4.9 miles (7.9 km) later, LA 6 crosses from Sabine Parish into Natchitoches Parish.

Continuing northeast into Natchitoches Parish, LA 6 enters the village of Robeline on Texas Street. At Oak Street, LA 6 intersects LA 120, which heads northwest to Marthaville. Just beyond Robeline is an intersection with LA 485, which heads to Powhatan, northwest of Natchitoches. 4.8 miles (7.7 km) later, at a point known as Hagewood, LA 6 intersects LA 117 north of Provencal.

3.3 miles (5.3 km) past Hagewood, LA 6 enters the far western city limit of Natchitoches, the parish seat of Natchitoches Parish, and widens to a divided four-lane highway as it passes through an interchange with I-49 at exit 138. I-49 connects to Shreveport to the northwest and Alexandria to the southeast. Immediately afterward, LA 6 intersects LA 504, which passes around the west side of Sibley Lake. It then intersects LA 3278, and the median gives way to a center turning lane.

=== Natchitoches to Clarence ===
Approaching the main part of town, LA 6 again becomes a divided four-lane highway as it reaches a four-way intersection at the Natchitoches Bypass. Here, LA 1 heads southeast on the bypass toward Alexandria; LA 6 Bus. continues straight through town on University Parkway; and mainline LA 6 turns north onto the bypass co-signed with LA 1. After passing along the east side of Sibley Lake for 0.8 miles (1.3 km), the roadway narrows to two lanes to cross a bridge over an outer arm of the lake. Continuing northward, LA 1 and LA 6 intersect LA 1 Bus. and LA 3191 (Texas Street). Shortly afterward, LA 6 turns to the northeast and separates from LA 1, passing along the north side of town. At a T-intersection with Washington Street, LA 6 rejoins the business route and turns north away from town.

2.3 miles (3.7 km) later, at a point known as Grand Ecore, LA 6 crosses a beam bridge over the Red River. It then curves east and intersects LA 486, the Campti Cutoff. Soon afterward, LA 6 enters the village of Clarence and intersects LA 1225 (Jefferson Highway). Immediately after crossing the Kansas City Southern Railway (KCS) tracks, LA 6 reaches its eastern terminus at a four-way intersection with US 71 and US 84. From this intersection, US 71 heads southeast to Alexandria; US 84 heads east to Winnfield; and northbound US 71 and westbound US 84 head northwest concurrently toward Coushatta.

=== Byway designation ===
The entirety of LA 6 is part of the Louisiana Colonial Trails in the state-designated system of tourist routes known as the Louisiana Scenic Byways.

== History ==
In the original Louisiana Highway system in use between 1921 and 1955, the modern LA 6 comprised the western segment of the original State Route 6, a rare case of numerical duplication between the two systems. While Route 6 was a cross-state route, the current highway only covers one-third of its counterpart's former route. From the present eastern terminus in Clarence, Route 6 continued eastward through Winnfield, Jena, Jonesville, and Ferriday to the Mississippi state line at Vidalia, located opposite the Mississippi River from Natchez. In 1934, US 84 was extended west into Louisiana over this route. (Note: The only exception is that US 84 was routed over a more direct route through Tullos, rather than Olla, between Winnfield and Jena.) While the pre-1955 system maintained state route designations on all U.S. Highways in the state, the 1955 Louisiana Highway renumbering eliminated unnecessary concurrencies of this sort, leaving only US 84 on the eastern segment.

Since the 1955 renumbering, the route of LA 6 has seen no major alignment changes apart from its shift onto a bypass around Natchitoches around the 1990s. LA 1 and LA 6 originally followed their current business routes through town. In 1975, the Natchitoches Bypass (constructed as LA 3110) was opened, relocating LA 1 on its current route, looping around the south and west side of town. LA 1 Bus. and LA 3191 were created at this time to cover the original route. Around 1980, a road was constructed to connect LA 6 with the LA 1 bypass on the north side of town. It was originally designated as LA 3175 and became part of LA 6 by the mid-1990s. LA 6 then became concurrent with LA 1 running along Sibley Lake, and LA 6 Bus. was created along the original route through Natchitoches.

Other alignment changes have resulted from the construction of bridges and the smoothing out of curves along much of the route. LA 6 originally entered Louisiana by crossing the Sabine River on a bridge built in 1937 at the former community of Pendleton, Texas. The current bridge, much longer in length, was constructed in 1963 when the river became part of the Toledo Bend Reservoir. Two miles of previously dry land at the western end of LA 6, an area formerly known as East Pendleton, are now under water crossed by the current bridge, which follows a slightly straighter alignment than the old road. Approaching the eastern terminus at Clarence, LA 6 originally crossed the Red River at Grand Ecore on a now-demolished bridge that existed immediately to the east of the current span built in 1959.

Much of LA 6 between Many and Natchitoches was reconstructed around the 1970s, straightening several sharp curves and zigzags. Fragments of the original route surviving today as local roads include: Shawnee Town Loop northeast of Many; Stoker Loop immediately northeast of Fort Jesup; Stewart Loop and Clower Loop between Fort Jesup and Robeline; Parish Road 648 (Johnny Floyd Road) northeast of Robeline; and Parish Road 542 (Old LA 6) on the west side of I-49. Two additional segments are still part of the state highway system. The first, LA 3118, serves the bypassed Fort Jesup State Historic Site. The second, LA 3278, is located at the west end of Natchitoches adjacent to I-49.

== Major intersections ==
Parish	Location	mi	km	Destinations	Notes
Sabine		0.000	0.000	SH 21 – San Augustine	Western terminus; continuation in Texas
Sabine		0.000– 2.505	0.000– 4.031	Bridge over Toledo Bend Reservoir (Sabine River)	
Sabine		6.077	9.780	LA 191 – Zwolle	To North Toledo Bend State Park
Sabine		12.785	20.575	LA 476 west – Negreet	Eastern terminus of LA 476
Sabine	Many	17.906	28.817	US 171 – Shreveport, Lake Charles	
Sabine	Many	19.020	30.610	LA 1217 north (Marthaville Road) – Marthaville	Southern terminus of LA 1217
Sabine	Fort Jesup	23.498	37.816	LA 3118 east	Western terminus of LA 3118; to Fort Jesup State Historic Site
Sabine	Fort Jesup	24.583	39.563	LA 3118 west	Eastern terminus of LA 3118; to Fort Jesup State Historic Site
Natchitoches	Robeline	32.271– 32.283	51.935– 51.954	LA 120 (Oak Street) – Marthaville	
Natchitoches		33.349	53.670	LA 485 north – Allen	Southern terminus of LA 485; to Los Adaes State Historic Site
Natchitoches	Hagewood	38.170	61.429	LA 117 south – Provencal	Northern terminus of LA 117; to Kisatchie National Forest
Natchitoches	Natchitoches	41.801– 41.953	67.272– 67.517	I-49 – Alexandria, Shreveport	Exit 138 on I-49
Natchitoches	Natchitoches	42.128	67.798	LA 504 east	Western terminus of LA 504
Natchitoches	Natchitoches	44.130	71.020	LA 3278 west	Eastern terminus of LA 3278
Natchitoches	Natchitoches	45.291– 45.300	72.889– 72.903	LA 1 south – Alexandria LA 6 Bus. east (University Parkway) – Natchitoches	Western end of LA 1 concurrency; western terminus of LA 6 Bus.; to Natchitoches Regional Airport and Northwestern State University
Natchitoches	Natchitoches	46.820– 46.871	75.349– 75.432	LA 1 Bus. south / LA 3191 north (Texas Street)	Northern terminus of LA 1 Bus.; southern terminus of LA 3191
Natchitoches	Natchitoches	47.279	76.088	LA 1 north – Shreveport	Eastern end of LA 1 concurrency
Natchitoches	Natchitoches	48.621	78.248	LA 6 Bus. west (Washington Street)	Eastern terminus of LA 6 Bus.
Natchitoches	Grand Ecore	50.944– 51.296	81.986– 82.553	Bridge over Red River	
Natchitoches		51.947	83.601	LA 486 west (Campti Cutoff) – Campti	Southern terminus of LA 486; to Natchitoches Parish Port
Natchitoches	Clarence	54.078	87.030	LA 1225 south (Jefferson Highway)	Northern terminus of LA 1225
Natchitoches	Clarence	54.518	87.738	US 71 / US 84 west – Alexandria, Shreveport US 84 east (Natchitoches Road) – Winnfield	Eastern terminus
1.000 mi = 1.609 km; 1.000 km = 0.621 mi: Concurrency terminus

== Business route ==
Louisiana Highway 6 Business
- Location: Natchitoches
- Length: 3.585 mi (5.769 km)
- Existed: 1990s–present

Louisiana Highway 6 Business (LA 6 Bus.) follows the original route of LA 6 through Natchitoches prior to its re-routing onto the Natchitoches Bypass around the 1990s.

From the intersection of LA 1 and LA 6 on the west side of town, LA 6 Bus. heads east on University Parkway, a divided four-lane roadway. As it passes alongside the Northwestern State University campus, the roadway narrows to two lanes with a center turning lane. Reaching an intersection with LA 1223 (Mill Street), LA 6 Bus. turns northward onto Jefferson Street, an undivided two-lane roadway, and enters the Natchitoches Historic District. Now running along the west bank of the Cane River Lake, LA 6 Bus. intersects LA 494 (Keyser Avenue), which traverses the eastern part of town on the opposite bank. Entering the downtown area, the roadway maintains a brick surface in keeping with its historic surroundings. At Church Street, LA 6 Bus. intersects LA 1 Bus. and LA 3191. Leaving the downtown area, LA 6 makes a slight jog onto Washington Street where it regains its modern road surface. 1.5 miles (2.4 km) later, LA 6 Bus. rejoins its parent route, which intersects from the west.

The entire highway is in Natchitoches, Natchitoches Parish.

mi	km	Destinations	Notes
0.000	0.000	LA 1 / LA 6 east – Alexandria, Shreveport LA 6 west (University Parkway) to I-49 – Many	Western terminus; to Natchitoches Regional Airport
1.192– 1.211	1.918– 1.949	LA 1223 south (Mill Street) – Alexandria	Northern terminus of LA 1223; to Natchitoches Regional Airport
1.445	2.326	LA 494 west (Keyser Avenue)	Northern terminus of LA 494
1.928	3.103	LA 1 Bus. (Church Street)	
3.585	5.769	LA 6 – Clarence, Shreveport	Eastern terminus
1.000 mi = 1.609 km; 1.000 km = 0.621 mi
