= Bayou Pierre (Louisiana) =

- Bayou Pierre

Location
- Country: United States
- State: Louisiana
- Parishes: Caddo; DeSoto; Red River; Natchitoches

Physical characteristics
- Source
  - location: Shreveport, Louisiana
  - coordinates: 32°28′15″N 93°44′16″W
- Mouth
  - location: Red River
  - coordinates: 32°21′03″N 93°39′00″W
- Discharge
  - location: Clarence, Louisiana

Basin features
- River system: Red River
- Cities: Shreveport; Natchitoches

Bayou Pierre is a partially man-made bayou and ancient course of the Red River in Louisiana, United States. It is a tributary of the Red River originating from an ancient bend of the Red River at Coate's Bluff (Wright Island) in Shreveport, LA (now blocked off by a levee to prevent the Red River from flooding into Bayou Pierre) and merging west from the town of Clarence, Louisiana. The upper part of Bayou Pierre within Shreveport city limits is now a concrete drainage ditch at the bottom of the former watercourse, and provides street drainage for much of eastern Shreveport before the concrete drainage ditch section ends south of LA 526.

Before the clearing of the Great Raftthat blocked much of the Red River and diverted water into alternate waterways such as Bayou Pierre, Bayou Pierre served as a navigable water route connecting the downriver plantations with Shreveport. Steamships would dock at the current site of Betty Virginia Park in Shreveport in order to bypass the raft and serve the plantations downriver. The 1835 treaty in which the Caddo sold their lands to the U.S. was signed at an Indian Agency House on the banks of Bayou Pierre, the location of which was also used to define the terms of the treaty.

== Wildlife Management Area ==
In Frierson, Louisiana, there is a wildlife area for Bayou Pierre and marshes. In this land, there are 2,799 acres. The land is owned by the Louisiana Department of Wildlife and Fisheries (LDWF). They allow hunting, trapping, and ornithology. Also, camping is allowed at specific areas.

=== History ===
In the early 1990s, farmers drained the area and destroyed the ecosystem. However, the farming attempts backfired assumedly because of poor soil absorption. The farmers gave up and deeded the land to the LDWF.

=== Ecosystem ===
The ecosystem is known to contain white-tailed deer, raccoons, sandpipers, dove, rabbits, and many types of waterfowl. In the winter, sandpipers flock to the area. Additionally, the area floods occasionally due to poor soil absorption.

== Fort Selden ==
Fort Selden was situated at the junction of Bayou Pierre and Red River in Natchitoches Parish, Louisiana.
