= List of original highways in Louisiana (1–50) =

The following is a list of state highways in the U.S. state of Louisiana designated in the 1-50 range prior to the 1955 Louisiana Highway renumbering. All were part of the original 98 state highways authorized by the state legislature in 1921.

== Louisiana State Route 1 ==
State Route 1
- Location: Pointe à la Hache–Caddo Parish
- Length: 452.7 mi (728.6 km)
- Existed: 1924–1955

Louisiana State Route 1 ran 452.7 miles (728.6 km) in a north–south direction from Pointe à la Hache to the Texas state line near Greenwood. The route was designated along the Jefferson Highway, an auto trail that ran from New Orleans to Winnipeg.

In 1926, US 71, US 171, and US 80 were overlaid on SR 1 from Baton Rouge to Clarence, Belmont to Shreveport, and Shreveport to the Texas state line, respectively. While the routes were signed concurrently, the state route designations were removed in the 1955 Louisiana Highway renumbering.

== Louisiana State Route 2 ==
State Route 2
- Location: Calcasieu Parish–St. Tammany Parish
- Length: 319.6 mi (514.3 km)
- Existed: 1921–1955

Louisiana State Route 2 ran 319.6 miles (514.3 km) in an east–west direction from the Texas state line via Lake Charles, Lafayette, Morgan City, and New Orleans to the Mississippi state line. The route was designated along the Old Spanish Trail.

In 1926, US 90 was overlaid on most of SR 2. While the route was signed concurrently, the SR 2 designation was removed in the 1955 Louisiana Highway renumbering.

== Louisiana State Route 3 ==
State Route 3
- Location: Baton Rouge–East Carroll Parish
- Length: 153.4 mi (246.9 km)
- Existed: 1921–1955

Louisiana State Route 3 ran 153.4 miles (246.9 km) in a north–south direction from Baton Rouge to the Arkansas state line north of Lake Providence. The designation existed in two segments as the roadway passed through the state of Mississippi between a point north of St. Francisville and Vidalia (opposite the Mississippi River from Natchez, Mississippi). North of Vidalia, the route also passed through St. Joseph, Newellton, and Tallulah.

In 1926, the southern segment became part of US 61, and the northern segment became part of US 65 when the numbered U.S. Highway system was created. Route 3 remained co-signed with its U.S. counterparts until the 1955 Louisiana Highway renumbering, which eliminated such overlaps. A portion of the route north of Lake Providence bypassed in the 1930s was designated as Route 3-D while it remained in the state highway system.

== Louisiana State Route 3-D ==
State Route 3-D
- Existed: 1931–1955

Louisiana State Route 3-D ran 8.72 miles (14.03 km) in a north–south direction from US 65/SR 3 north of Lake Providence to US 65/SR 3 at Millikin. It was a portion of SR 3 bypassed in 1931.

== Louisiana State Route 4 ==
State Route 4
- Location: Richland Parish–Shreveport
- Length: 182.1 mi (293.1 km)
- Existed: 1924–1955

Louisiana State Route 4 ran 182.1 miles (293.1 km) in a north–south direction from the Mississippi state line to LA 1 in Shreveport. The route was designated along the Dixie Overland Highway.

In 1926, US 80 was overlaid on the entirety of SR 4. While the route was signed concurrently, the SR 4 designation was removed in the 1955 Louisiana Highway renumbering.

== Louisiana State Route 5 ==
State Route 5
- Existed: 1921–1955

Louisiana State Route 5 existed from 1921 to 1955.

== Louisiana State Route 5-D ==
State Route 5-D
- Existed: 1921–1955

Louisiana State Route 5-D existed from 1921 to 1955.

== Louisiana State Route 6 ==
State Route 6
- Location: Concordia Parish–Sabine Parish
- Length: 163.4 mi (263.0 km)
- Existed: 1924–1955

Louisiana State Route 6 ran 163.4 miles (263.0 km) in an east–west direction from the Texas state line at the Sabine River to the Mississippi state line at Vidalia.

In 1934, US 84 was extended on top of the eastern half of SR 6 from the Mississippi state line to Clarence. While the route was signed concurrently, the state route designation was removed in the 1955 renumbering; the western half became the modern LA 6.

== Louisiana State Route 7 ==
State Route 7
- Location: Calcasieu Parish–Washington Parish
- Existed: 1921–1955

Louisiana State Route 7 ran in a west–east direction from the Texas state line at the Sabine River to the Mississippi state line at Bogalusa.

In 1926, US 190 was overlaid on SR 7 from Ripley to the Mississippi state line. While the route was marked concurrently, the SR 7 designation was cancelled in favor of US 190 in the 1955 renumbering. The remainder of SR 7 became LA 12.

== Louisiana State Route 8 ==
State Route 8
- Location: Caddo Parish
- Length: 36.2 mi (58.3 km)
- Existed: 1921–1955

Louisiana State Route 8 ran 36.2 miles (58.3 km) in a north–south direction from US 71/SR 55 north of Shreveport to the Texas state line northwest of Rodessa.

The route became the northernmost of LA 1 in the 1955 Louisiana Highway renumbering.

== Louisiana State Route 9 ==
State Route 9
- Existed: 1921–1955

Louisiana State Route 9 existed from 1921 to 1955.

== Louisiana State Route 10 ==
State Route 10
- Existed: 1921–1955

Louisiana State Route 10 ran in a north–south direction from the Arkansas state line near Plain Dealing to Bossier City.

SR 10 became LA 3 in the 1955 renumbering.

== Louisiana State Route 10-D ==
State Route 10-D
- Existed: 1921–1955

Louisiana State Route 10-D existed from 1921 to 1955.

== Louisiana State Route 11 ==
State Route 11
- Existed: 1921–1955

Louisiana State Route 11 existed from 1921 to 1955.

== Louisiana State Route 12 ==
State Route 12
- Location: Creston–Homer
- Length: 84.3 mi (135.7 km)
- Existed: 1921–1955

Louisiana State Route 12 ran 84.3 miles (135.7 km) in a general north–south direction from Creston to Homer.

The route became the central portion of LA 9 in the 1955 renumbering.

== Louisiana State Route 13 ==
State Route 13
- Location: Loggy Bayou–West Monroe
- Length: 93.2 mi (150.0 km)
- Existed: 1921–1955

Louisiana State Route 13 ran 93.2 miles (150.0 km) in an east–west direction from US 71/SR 10 at Loggy Bayou to US 80/SR 4 west of West Monroe.

The route was split among seven different routes in the 1955 Louisiana Highway renumbering.

== Louisiana State Route 14 ==
State Route 14
- Location: Rapides Parish–Morehouse Parish
- Length: 150.3 mi (241.9 km)
- Existed: 1921–1955

Louisiana State Route 14 ran 150.3 miles (241.9 km) in a north–south direction from US 71/US 167/SR 1 in Alexandria to the Arkansas state line near Mer Rouge.

In 1926, US 165 was overlaid on the entirety of SR 14. While the route was signed concurrently, the state route designation was removed in the 1955 renumbering.

== Louisiana State Route 14-D ==
State Route 14-D
- Existed: 1921–1955

Louisiana State Route 14-D existed from 1921 to 1955.

== Louisiana State Route 15 ==
State Route 15
- Length: 110.4 mi (177.7 km)
- Existed: 1924–1955

Louisiana State Route 15 ran 110.4 miles (177.7 km) in a north–south direction from US 65/US 84/SR 6 in Ferriday to SR 11 in Farmersville.

SR 15 became the modern LA 15 in the 1955 renumbering.

== Louisiana State Route 15-D ==
State Route 15-D
- Location: Concordia Parish
- Existed: 1938–1955

Louisiana State Route 15-D ran 3.4 miles (5.5 km) in a south–north direction from US 65/SR 16 near Red Gum to US 65/SR 3 in Clayton.

== Louisiana State Route 16 ==
State Route 16
- Location: West Carroll Parish–Franklin Parish
- Length: 67.2 mi (108.1 km)
- Existed: 1921–1955

Louisiana State Route 16 ran 67.2 miles (108.1 km) in a north–south direction from the Arkansas state line at Kilbourne to Winnsboro.

The route became LA 17 in the 1955 Louisiana Highway renumbering.

== Louisiana State Route 17 ==
State Route 17
- Existed: 1921–1955

Louisiana State Route 17 existed from 1921 to 1955.

== Louisiana State Route 18 ==
State Route 18
- Existed: 1921–1955

Louisiana State Route 18 existed from 1921 to 1955.

== Louisiana State Route 19 ==
State Route 19
- Location: Grant Parish–Catahoula Parish
- Length: 69.1 mi (111.2 km)
- Existed: 1921–1955

Louisiana State Route 19 ran 69.1 miles (111.2 km) in an east–west direction from Colfax to Harrisonburg.

The route became a portion of LA 8 in the 1955 Louisiana Highway renumbering.

== Louisiana State Route 20 ==
State Route 20
- Location: Alexandria–Shreveport
- Length: 128.8 mi (207.3 km)
- Existed: 1921–1955

Louisiana State Route 20 ran 128.8 miles (207.3 km) in a south–north direction from Alexandria to Shreveport.

The route became a portion of LA 1 in the 1955 Louisiana Highway renumbering.

== Louisiana State Route 21 ==
State Route 21
- Existed: 1921–1955

Louisiana State Route 21 existed from 1921 to 1955.

== Louisiana State Route 22 ==
State Route 22
- Existed: 1921–1955

Louisiana State Route 22 existed from 1921 to 1955.

== Louisiana State Route 22-D ==
State Route 22-D
- Existed: 1921–1955

Louisiana State Route 22-D existed from 1921 to 1955.

== Louisiana State Route 23 ==
State Route 23
- Location: Ville Platte–Gold Dust
- Length: 20.1 mi (32.3 km)
- Existed: 1921–1955

Louisiana State Route 23 ran 20.1 miles (32.3 km) in a north–south direction from US 167/SR 22 west of Ville Platte to a dead end at Gold Dust.

The route was split among four different routes in the 1955 Louisiana Highway renumbering.

== Louisiana State Route 24 ==
State Route 24
- Existed: 1921–1955

Louisiana State Route 24 existed from 1921 to 1955.

== Louisiana State Route 24-D ==
State Route 24-D
- Existed: 1921–1955

Louisiana State Route 24-D existed from 1921 to 1955.

== Louisiana State Route 24-E ==
State Route 24-E
- Existed: 1921–1955

Louisiana State Route 24-E existed from 1921 to 1955.

== Louisiana State Route 25 ==
State Route 25
- Existed: 1921–1955

Louisiana State Route 25 existed from 1921 to 1955.

== Louisiana State Route 25-D ==
State Route 25-D
- Existed: 1921–1955

Louisiana State Route 25-D existed from 1921 to 1955.

== Louisiana State Route 26 ==
State Route 5
- Existed: 1921–1955

Louisiana State Route 26 ran in a north–south direction from Kaplan to SR 1 (now US 71) near Lecompte. In 1926, US 167 was overlaid on the section from Turkey Creek north to SR 1. SR 26 was extended south to Forked Island at the Gulf Intracoastal Waterway by 1928. While the route was marked concurrently, SR 26 was deleted in favor of US 167 in the 1955 renumbering. The remainder of SR 26 became LA 13 from Turkey Creek to Kaplan and LA 35 from Kaplan to Forked Island.

== Louisiana State Route 26-D ==
State Route 26-D
- Existed: 1921–1955

Louisiana State Route 26-D existed from 1921 to 1955.

== Louisiana State Route 27 ==
State Route 27
- Existed: 1921–1955

Louisiana State Route 27 existed from 1921 to 1955.

== Louisiana State Route 28 ==
State Route 28
- Existed: 1921–1955

Louisiana State Route 28 existed from 1921 to 1955.

== Louisiana State Route 29 ==
State Route 29
- Existed: 1921–1955

Louisiana State Route 29 existed from 1921 to 1955.

== Louisiana State Route 30 ==
State Route 30
- Existed: 1921–1955

Louisiana State Route 30 existed from 1921 to 1955.

== Louisiana State Route 30-D ==
State Route 30-D
- Existed: 1928–1955

Louisiana State Route 30-D existed from 1921 to 1955.

== Louisiana State Route 30-E ==
State Route 30-E
- Location: Pointe Coupee Parish
- Length: 8.0 mi (12.9 km)
- Existed: 1928–1955

Louisiana State Route 30-E ran 8.0 miles (12.9 km) in a north–south direction from SR 30 near Lettsworth to a second junction with SR 30 near Simmesport at the Atchafalaya River. It was a portion of SR 30 bypassed in 1928 by a new alignment.

== Louisiana State Route 30-F ==
State Route 30-F
- Existed: 1928–1955

Louisiana State Route 30-F existed from 1921 to 1955.

== Louisiana State Route 31 ==
State Route 5
- Existed: 1921–1955

Louisiana State Route 31 existed from 1921 to 1955.

== Louisiana State Route 32 ==
State Route 5
- Existed: 1921–1955

Louisiana State Route 32 existed from 1921 to 1955.

== Louisiana State Route 33 ==
State Route 33
- Length: 71.3 mi (114.7 km)
- Existed: 1921–1955

Louisiana State Route 33 ran 71.3 miles (114.7 km) in a north–south direction from South Carollton Avenue in New Orleans to the Mississippi state line near Frenier. The route was part of the proposed Lakeshore Highway, but construction on the section from Kenner to Frenier was abandoned in the early 1930s mainly due to the completion of the Bonnet Carrè Spillway that split the route in half. In 1926, US 51 was overlaid on top of SR 33. While the route was marked concurrently, the state route designation was removed in the 1955 renumbering.

== Louisiana State Route 34 ==
State Route 34
- Location: Slidell-Washington Perish
- Existed: 1921–1955

Louisiana State Route 34 ran in a north–south direction from Slidell to the Mississippi state line at Warnerton.

In 1926, US 190 was overlaid on the portion of SR 34 from Covington to Slidell. While the route was marked concurrently, SR 34 was deleted in favor of US 190 in the 1955 renumbering. The remainder of SR 34 became LA 25.

== Louisiana State Route 35 ==
State Route 35
- Location: Amite City-Franklinton
- Existed: 1921–1955

Louisiana State Route 35 ran in a west–east direction from Amite City to Franklinton.

The route became a portion of LA 16 in the 1955 renumbering.

== Louisiana State Route 36 ==
State Route 36
- Existed: 1921–1955

Louisiana State Route 36 existed from 1921 to 1955.

== Louisiana State Route 37 ==
State Route 37
- Existed: 1921–1955

Louisiana State Route 37 existed from 1921 to 1955.

== Louisiana State Route 38 ==
State Route 38
- Existed: 1921–1955

Louisiana State Route 38 existed from 1921 to 1955.

== Louisiana State Route 39 ==
State Route 39
- Location: Leesville–Hagewood
- Length: 41.9 mi (67.4 km)
- Existed: 1921–1955

Louisiana State Route 39 ran 41.9 miles (67.4 km) in a north–south direction from US 171/SR 42 in Leesville to SR 6 at Hagewood.

The route became LA 117 in the 1955 Louisiana Highway renumbering.

== Louisiana State Route 40 ==
State Route 40
- Existed: 1921–1955

Louisiana State Route 40 existed from 1921 to 1955.

== Louisiana State Route 41 ==
State Route 41
- Location: Pointe Coupee Parish
- Length: 8.0 mi (12.9 km)
- Existed: 1921–1955

Louisiana State Route 41 ran 8.0 miles (12.9 km) in an east–west direction from SR 1 east of Melville to SR 30 in Morganza.

The route became part of LA 10 in the 1955 Louisiana Highway renumbering.

== Louisiana State Route 42 ==
State Route 42
- Length: 194.8 mi (313.5 km)
- Existed: 1924–1955

Louisiana State Route 42 ran 194.8 miles (313.5 km) in a north–south direction from Cameron to SR 9/US 84 at Mansfield.

In 1926, US 171 was overlaid on top of SR 42. While the route was marked concurrently, SR 42 was deleted in favor of US 171 in the 1955 renumbering.

== Louisiana State Route 42-D ==
State Route 42-D
- Existed: 1921–1955

Louisiana State Route 42-D existed from 1921 to 1955.

== Louisiana State Route 42-E ==
State Route 42-E
- Existed: 1921–1955

Louisiana State Route 42-E existed from 1921 to 1955.

== Louisiana State Route 43 ==
State Route 43
- Location: Breaux Bridge-Gulf Intracoastal Waterway
- Existed: 1921–1955

Louisiana State Route 43 ran in a general west–east direction from Breaux Bridge to the Gulf Intracoastal Waterway.

When SR 43 was designated in 1921, it ran from Breaux Bridge to Abbeville. In 1926, the route was extended to the Gulf Intracoastal Waterway south of Abbeville. In 1949, US 167 was overlaid on top of SR 43 from Lafayette to Abbeville. While the route was marked concurrently, SR 43 was deleted in favor of US 167 in the 1955 renumbering. The remainder of SR 43 became LA 94 from Breaux Bridge to Lafayette, LA 82 from Abbeville to Esther and LA 333 from Esther to the Intracoastal Waterway.

== Louisiana State Route 44 ==
State Route 44
- Location: Ruston–Farmerville
- Length: 19.6 mi (31.5 km)
- Existed: 1921–1955

Louisiana State Route 44 ran 19.6 miles (31.5 km) in a north–south direction from US 80/SR 4 in Ruston to SR 15 southwest of Farmerville.

The route became the southern half of LA 33 in the 1955 Louisiana Highway renumbering.

== Louisiana State Route 45 ==
State Route 45
- Existed: 1921–1955

Louisiana State Route 45 existed from 1921 to 1955.

== Louisiana State Route 46 ==
State Route 46
- Existed: 1921–1955

Louisiana State Route 46 existed from 1921 to 1955.

== Louisiana State Route 47 ==
State Route 47
- Location: Mangham–Bastrop
- Length: 40.9 mi (65.8 km)
- Existed: 1921–1955

Louisiana State Route 47 ran 40.9 miles (65.8 km) in a north–south direction from SR 15 north of Mangham to SR 14 south of Bastrop.

The route was split among five new routes in the 1955 Louisiana Highway renumbering.

== Louisiana State Route 48 ==
State Route 48
- Existed: 1921–1955

Louisiana State Route 48 existed from 1921 to 1955.

== Louisiana State Route 49 ==
State Route 49
- Existed: 1921–1955

Louisiana State Route 49 existed from 1921 to 1955.

== Louisiana State Route 50 ==
State Route 50
- Existed: 1921–1955

Louisiana State Route 50 ran 17.7 miles (28.5 km) in an east–west direction from Campti to Goldonna via Creston.

The section from Campti to Creston became LA 9 and the section from Creston to Goldonna became LA 156 in the 1955 Louisiana Highway renumbering.
