= Fort Selden (Louisiana) =

- At the junction of Bayou Pierre and Red River, Natchitoches Parish, Louisiana in United States

Site information
- Type: U.S. Army Post

Site history
- Built: 1820
- Built by: Lieutenant Colonel Zachary Taylor
- In use: -1822
- Fate: Abandoned
- Events: Troops moved to Fort Jesup in 1822

Garrison information
- Past commanders: Lieutenant Colonel Zachary Taylor
- Occupants: 7h U.S. Infantry, 4 companies Headquarters, Western Military Department (briefly 1822)
- Designations: Fort Selden, Red River

Fort Selden was established by Lieutenant Colonel Zachary Taylor in November 1820 in order to protect the frontier. The post was first called Camp Ripley after Brigadier General Eleazer Wheelock Ripley, then Fort Selden for Captain Joseph Selden, Corps of Artillery. When Fort Jesup was established in 1822, the troops were transferred to the new post and the old post was abandoned.

== History ==
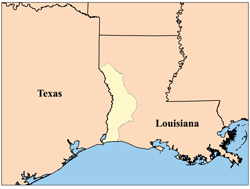
The Neutral Ground in Louisiana.

In 1806 United States and Spain agreed on a neutral strip on the Louisiana-Texas line. After the Adam-Onis Treaty in 1819, the strip fell to the United States. The strip was a haunt of outlaws and robbers and the United States government moved to pacify it. Since the treaty was not ratified until 1821, a military post was to be established just outside the eastern edge of the strip.

On November 19, 1820, Lieutenant Colonel Zachary Taylor and four companies of 7th U.S. Infantry arrived to Natchitoches, Louisiana. Taylor chose a point on the Bayou Pierre about 12 miles from Natchitoches as site for a temporary post called Fort Selden. Taylor subsequently received order to scout out the site of a permanent post. In March 1821, Major General Edmund P. Gaines inspected Fort Selden and gave a highly positive report on Taylor's command. He also agreed on the place of a new post, the later Fort Jesup. Gaines subsequently ordered Taylor and his command to abandon Fort Selden and move to the site of the new post.
