= Natchitoches Regional Airport =

Airport in Louisiana, United States

- IATA: none; ICAO: KIER; FAA LID: IER

Summary
- Airport type: Public
- Owner: City of Natchitoches
- Serves: Natchitoches, Louisiana
- Elevation AMSL: 121 ft / 37 m
- Coordinates: 31°44′09″N 093°05′57″W
- Interactive map of Natchitoches Regional Airport

Runways
Direction	Length		Surface
Direction	ft	m	Surface
17/35	5,003	1,525	Asphalt
7/25	4,000	1,219	Asphalt

Statistics (2008)
- Aircraft operations: 15,715
- Based aircraft: 45
- Source: Federal Aviation Administration

Natchitoches Regional Airport (ICAO: KIER, FAA LID: IER) is a city-owned public-use airport located two nautical miles (4 km) south of the central business district of Natchitoches, a parish seat of Natchitoches Parish, Louisiana, United States.

Although most U.S. airports use the same three-letter location identifier for the FAA and IATA, Natchitoches Regional Airport is assigned IER by the FAA but has no designation from the IATA.

The airport is the location of the plane crash which claimed the lives of Jim Croce and several others at 9:45 PM CDT on September 20, 1973, less than an hour after the end of Croce's last concert.

== Facilities and aircraft ==
Natchitoches Regional Airport covers an area of 205 acres (83 ha) at an elevation of 121 feet (37 m) above mean sea level. It has two asphalt paved runways: 17/35 is 5,003 by 150 feet (1,525 x 46 m) and 7/25 is 4,000 by 100 feet (1,219 x 30 m).

For the 12-month period ending July 10, 2008, the airport had 15,715 aircraft operations, an average of 43 per day: 98% general aviation, 1% air taxi and 1% military. At that time there were 45 aircraft based at this airport: 82% single-engine, 9% multi-engine, 2% jet, 4% helicopter and 2% ultralight.

== See also ==
- List of airports in Louisiana
