= Lena, Louisiana =

- Unincorporated community
- Location within Louisiana Location within the United States
- Coordinates: 31°27′39″N 92°46′15″W
- Country: United States
- State: Louisiana
- Parish: Rapides
- Elevation: 135 ft (41 m)
- Time zone: UTC-6 (Central (CST))
  - Summer (DST): UTC-5 (CDT)
- ZIP code: 71447
- Area code: 318
- GNIS feature ID: 555022

Lena is an unincorporated community in Rapides Parish, Louisiana, United States. Its ZIP code is 71447.
