= Marthaville, Louisiana =

Marthaville
- Census-designated place
- Location of Marthaville in Louisiana Marthaville (the United States)
- Coordinates: 31°44′20″N 93°23′48″W
- Country: United States
- State: Louisiana
- Parish: Natchitoches
- Founded: 1851
- Elevation: 243 ft (74 m)

Population (2020)
  - Total: 90
- Time zone: UTC-6 (CST)
  - Summer (DST): UTC-5 (CDT)
- Area code: 318

Marthaville is an unincorporated community and census-designated place (CDP) in Natchitoches Parish, Louisiana. It was first listed as a CDP in the 2020 census with a population of 90. It is part of the Natchitoches Micropolitan Statistical Area.

== History ==
Marthaville was founded in 1851. The founder, James Jackson Rains, named the town after his wife, Martha Ann Whitlock Rains. The town, during its peak, had a train stop, a bank, a general store, a bar, a hotel, etc. In the late 1960s, the railroad was removed and the town experienced an economic downturn. Now it is an unincorporated community, still having the store, post office, etc., and it is home to two churches in the area in addition to an Elementary and Junior High school.

== Geography ==
Marthaville is located on the western edge of Natchitoches Parish, seven miles west of Robeline near the border with Sabine Parish.

== Demographics ==
Historical population
Census	Pop.	Note	%±
2020	90		—
U.S. Decennial Census; 2020

Marthaville first appeared as a census designated place in the 2020 U.S. census.

=== 2020 census ===
Marthaville CDP, Louisiana – Racial and ethnic composition Note: the US Census treats Hispanic/Latino as an ethnic category. This table excludes Latinos from the racial categories and assigns them to a separate category. Hispanics/Latinos may be of any race.
Race / Ethnicity (NH = Non-Hispanic)	Pop 2020	% 2020
White alone (NH)	81	90.00%
Black or African American alone (NH)	0	0.00%
Native American or Alaska Native alone (NH)	2	2.22%
Asian alone (NH)	0	0.00%
Pacific Islander alone (NH)	0	0.00%
Other race alone (NH)	1	1.11%
Mixed race or Multiracial (NH)	3	3.33%
Hispanic or Latino (any race)	3	3.33%
Total	90	100.00%

== Arts and culture ==
The Marthaville Good Ole Days Festival is "A two-day September festival that celebrates the past with activities for the whole family, including games, live entertainment, arts and crafts, a parade, and delicious food." The Marthaville Good Ole Days Festival attracts about 1,500 people to the area.
