= List of Louisiana Scenic Byways =

Louisiana Scenic Byways
- Highway marker for Louisiana Scenic Byways

System information
- Maintained by La DOTD
- Length: 3,144 mi (5,060 km)
- Formed: 1993; reorganized 2010

Highway names
- Interstates: Interstate nn (I-nn)
- US Highways: U.S. Highway nn (US nn)
- State: Louisiana Highway nn (LA nn)

System links
- Louisiana State Highway System; Interstate; US; State; Scenic

The Louisiana Scenic Byways are a network of roadways within the U.S. state of Louisiana that have been deemed of cultural, historical, or scenic value. The routes follow various segments of the state-maintained highway system, usually rural in character, and are mostly located in the central and southern areas of the state.

== List ==
There are currently 18 routes that are active members of the Louisiana Scenic Byways program, following its reorganization in 2010.

| Name | Length (mi) | Length (km) | Date | Description |
|---|---|---|---|---|
| Bayou Teche Byway | 184 | 296 | 1995 | Travels alongside Bayou Teche from Morgan City to Arnaudville; includes west and east bank routes with an additional loop through the Catahoula area; component highways include LA 31 and LA 182 |
| Boom or Bust Byway | 136 | 219 | 2011 | Travels primarily along LA 2 from the Texas state line to Lisbon with a loop at either end; highlights several small towns that once prospered in the oil/gas and lumber industries |
| Cajun Corridor | 34 | 55 | | Linear route along LA 14 from Gueydan through Abbeville to Delcambre; highlights Cajun cuisine |
| Cane River National Heritage Trail | 71 | 114 | | Linear route (with occasional spurs) along the Cane River via LA 1, LA 119, and LA 494 from Lena to Natchitoches; and LA 6 and LA 485 to Allen |
| Creole Nature Trail | 207 | 333 | 1975 | Louisiana's only All-American Road, highlighting the diverse wildlife in the marshes and prairies of coastal Cameron Parish and the Lake Charles area; includes portions of LA 27 and LA 82 |
| Historic US 80 / Dixie Overland | 113 | 182 | | Linear route along US 80 from Ruston through Monroe to the Mississippi River opposite Vicksburg, Mississippi |
| Flyway Byway | 55 | 89 | 2014 | Circular tour through Jefferson Davis Parish through Welsh, Jennings, and Lake Arthur; includes portions of US 90, LA 14, LA 26, and LA 99 |
| Longleaf Trail Byway | 17 | 27 | 1989 | Linear route on Forest Highway 59 through the Kisatchie National Forest between LA 117 and LA 119 |
| Louisiana Colonial Trails | 484 | 779 | | Complex network of roadways across central Louisiana including portions of the Old San Antonio Road and El Camino Real; component highways include US 84, LA 6, and LA 8 |
| Great River Road | 772 | 1,242 | 1965 | Louisiana's portion of this National Scenic Byway parallels the Mississippi River from the Gulf of Mexico to the Arkansas state line |
| Myths and Legends Byway | 181 | 291 | 2012 | Network of roads primarily in Beauregard and Allen parishes, passing through former Atakapa and Coushatta Indian lands and old sawmill towns |
| Northup Trail | 123 | 198 | 2014 | Places associated with Solomon Northup and Twelve Years a Slave; includes US 71 between Bunkie and Marksville |
| San Bernardo Byway | 35 | 56 | 1996 | Generally linear route along LA 46 that highlights the multinational history of St. Bernard Parish |
| Southern Swamps Byway | 69 | 111 | | Traverses the Maurepas and Manchac swampland along Old US 51 and LA 22 |
| Toledo Bend Forest Scenic Byway | 78 | 126 | 1995 | Follows LA 191 along the Toledo Bend Reservoir, the largest man-made lake in the southern United States |
| Tunica Trace Byway | 20 | 32 | 1995 | Follows LA 66 from US 61 to the Louisiana State Penitentiary at Angola |
| Wetlands Cultural Byway | 282 | 454 | | Network of roads through the bayous and wetlands of Lafourche and Terrebonne parishes |
| Zydeco Cajun Prairie Byway | 283 | 455 | | Network of roads through the Acadiana region of Louisiana, highlights the area's abundance of Zydeco music and festivals |

== Creole Nature Trail ==
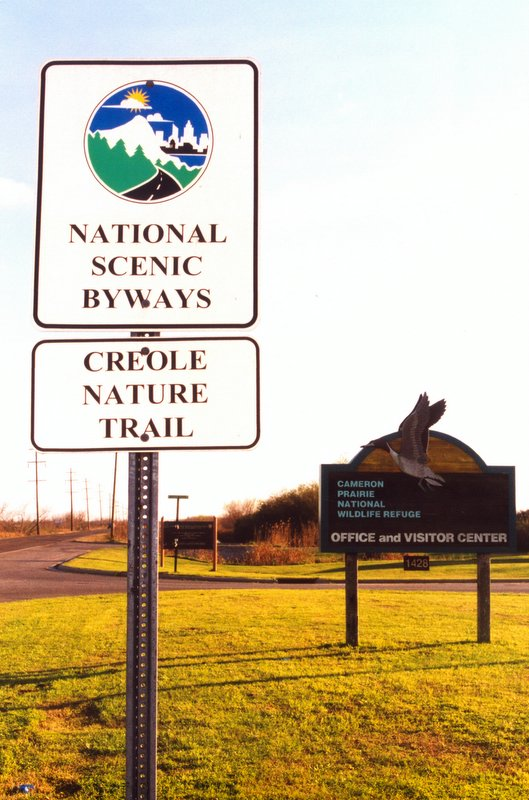
Creole Nature Trail route marker.

The Creole Nature Trail is an All-American Road that is designated primarily along stretches of LA 27 and LA 82 in Cameron and Calcasieu parishes, located in the southwestern corner of the state. Like most of Louisiana's Scenic Byways, it does not follow a linear route but instead consists of a network of existing state-maintained highways. The trail spans a total of 180 miles (290 km) through a remote area sometimes referred to as "Louisiana's Outback." The surroundings range from marshland and prairie to sandy beaches and contain a wide variety of wildlife, including alligators, birds, butterflies, and fish. Four wildlife refuges are located along the route.
