= Allen, Louisiana =

- unincorporated community
- Hamlet of Allen
- Location within Louisiana Location within the United States
- Coordinates: 31°50′08″N 93°17′19″W
- Country: United States
- States: Louisiana
- Parish: Natchitoches Parish
- Time zone: UTC-6 (Central (CST))
  - Summer (DST): UTC-5 (CDT)

Allen is an unincorporated community in Natchitoches Parish, Louisiana, United States. It is located approximately 11 miles northwest of Natchitoches near the intersection of Interstate 49 (exit 148) and Louisiana Highway 485.

The community is part of the Natchitoches Micropolitan Statistical Area.
