= Clarence, Louisiana =

- Village
- Village of Clarence
- Location of Clarence in Natchitoches Parish, Louisiana.

- Location within Louisiana Location within the United States
- Coordinates: 31°49′13″N 93°01′44″W
- Country: United States
- States: Louisiana
- Parish: Natchitoches

Area
  - Total: 1.58 sq mi (4.08 km^{2})
  - Land: 1.57 sq mi (4.07 km^{2})
  - Water: 0.0039 sq mi (0.01 km^{2})

Population (2020)
  - Total: 326
  - Rank: NC: 5th
  - Density: 207.4/sq mi (80.09/km^{2})
- Time zone: UTC-6 (CST)
  - Summer (DST): UTC-5 (CDT)
- ZIP code: 71414
- Area code: 318
- FIPS code: 22-15745

Clarence is a village in Natchitoches Parish, Louisiana, United States. As of the 2020 census, Clarence had a population of 326. It is located some seven miles east of the parish seat of Natchitoches and is part of the Natchitoches Micropolitan Statistical Area.

== History ==
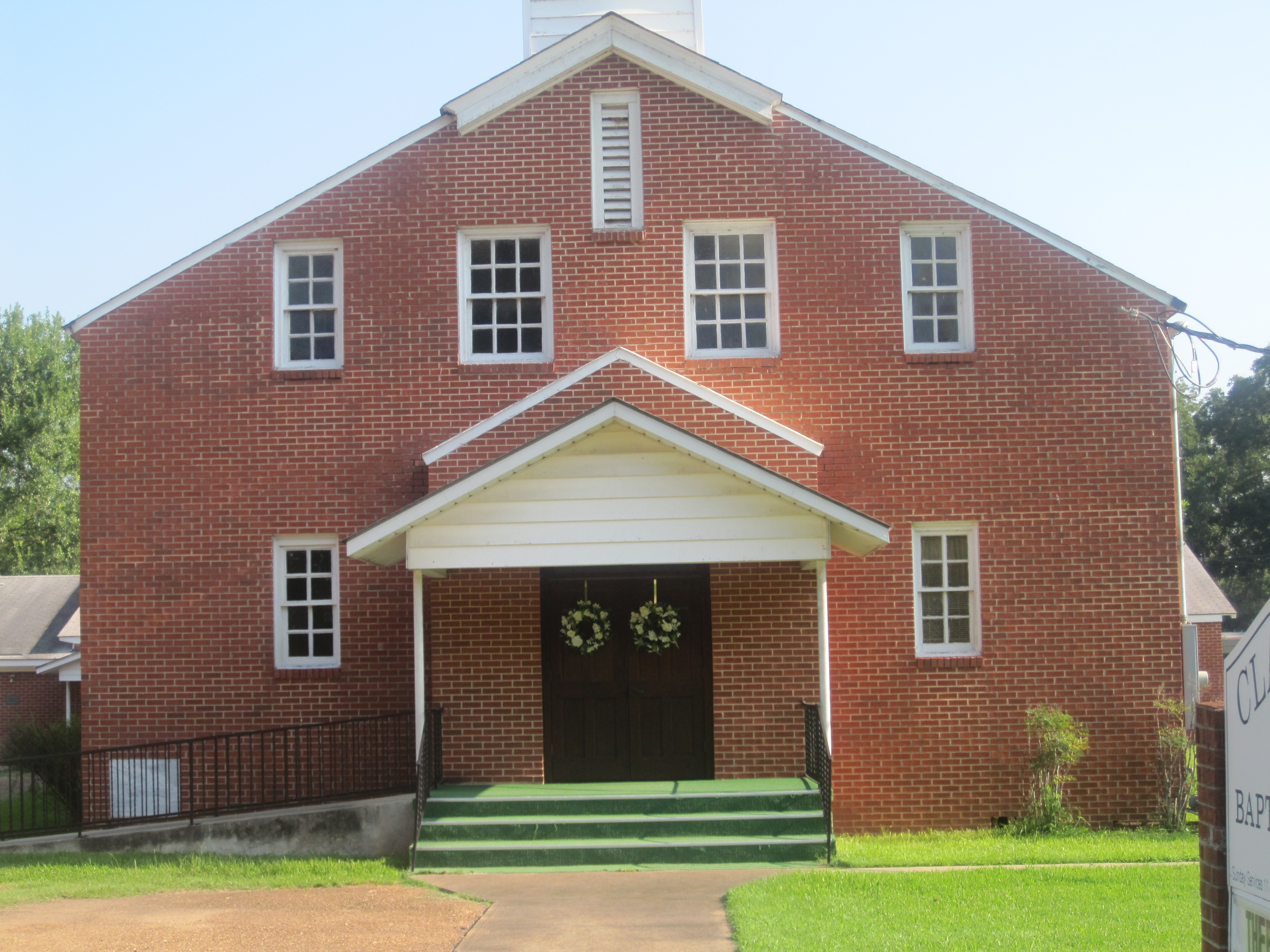
Clarence Baptist Church

The Harrisonburg Road or the Natchez Trace ran through the area as it crossed Louisiana into Texas to connect with the El Camino Real.

== Demographics ==
Historical population
Census	Pop.	Note	%±
1960	286		—
1970	448		56.6%
1980	612		36.6%
1990	577		−5.7%
2000	516		−10.6%
2010	499		−3.3%
2020	326		−34.7%
2025 (est.)	316	▼	−3.1%
U.S. Decennial Census

=== 2020 census ===
Clarence racial composition
Race	Number	Percentage
White (non-Hispanic)	69	21.17%
Black or African American (non-Hispanic)	239	73.31%
Native American	3	0.92%
Other/Mixed	13	3.99%
Hispanic or Latino	2	0.61%

As of the 2020 United States census, there were 326 people, 131 households, and 58 families residing in the village.

=== 2010 census ===
At the 2010 census , there were 499 people, 186 households and 136 families residing in the village. The population density was 311.9 inhabitants per square mile (120.4/km^{2}). There were 204 housing units at an average density of 127.5 units per square mile (49.2 units/km^{2}). The racial makeup of the village was 23.2% White, 75.2% African American, and 1.2% from two or more races. Hispanic or Latino of any race were 2.2% of the population.

There were 186 households, of which 36% had children under the age of 18 living with them, 37.1% were married couples living together, 30.6% had a female householder with no husband present, and 26.9% were non-families. 22% of all households were made up of individuals, and 9.1% had someone living alone who was 65 years of age or older. The average household size was 2.68 and the average family size was 3.13.

Age distribution was 29.1% under the age of 18, 9.3% from 18 to 24, 21.6% from 25 to 44, 28% from 45 to 64, and 12.0% who were 65 years of age or older. The median age was 36.5 years. For every 100 females, there were 87.6 males. For every 100 females age 18 and over, there were 78.5 males.

At the 2000 census The median household income was $25,278, and the median family income was $25,694. Males had a median income of $24,375 versus $17,841 for females. The per capita income for the village was $13,360. About 27.9% of families and 28.3% of the population were below the poverty line, including 36.9% of those under age 18 and 40.0% of those age 65 or over.

== Geography ==
Clarence is located at 31°49′13″N 93°1′44″W (31.820143, −93.028773).

According to the United States Census Bureau, the village has a total area of 1.6 square miles (4.1 km^{2}), all land.

=== Climate ===
Climate is characterized by relatively high temperatures and evenly distributed precipitation throughout the year. The Köppen Climate Classification subtype for this climate is "Cfa". (Humid Subtropical Climate).

Climate data for Clarence, Louisiana
Month	Jan	Feb	Mar	Apr	May	Jun	Jul	Aug	Sep	Oct	Nov	Dec	Year
Mean daily maximum °C (°F)	15 (59)	17 (63)	22 (71)	26 (79)	29 (85)	33 (91)	34 (94)	34 (94)	32 (89)	27 (80)	21 (69)	17 (62)	26 (78)
Mean daily minimum °C (°F)	3 (38)	4 (40)	8 (46)	12 (54)	17 (62)	21 (69)	22 (72)	22 (71)	18 (65)	12 (54)	7 (45)	4 (39)	13 (55)
Average precipitation mm (inches)	130 (5.1)	120 (4.7)	120 (4.9)	120 (4.6)	130 (5.2)	110 (4.2)	89 (3.5)	76 (3.0)	84 (3.3)	97 (3.8)	110 (4.5)	130 (5.3)	1,316 (52.1)
Source: Weatherbase
