= Robeline, Louisiana =

- Village
- Village of Robeline
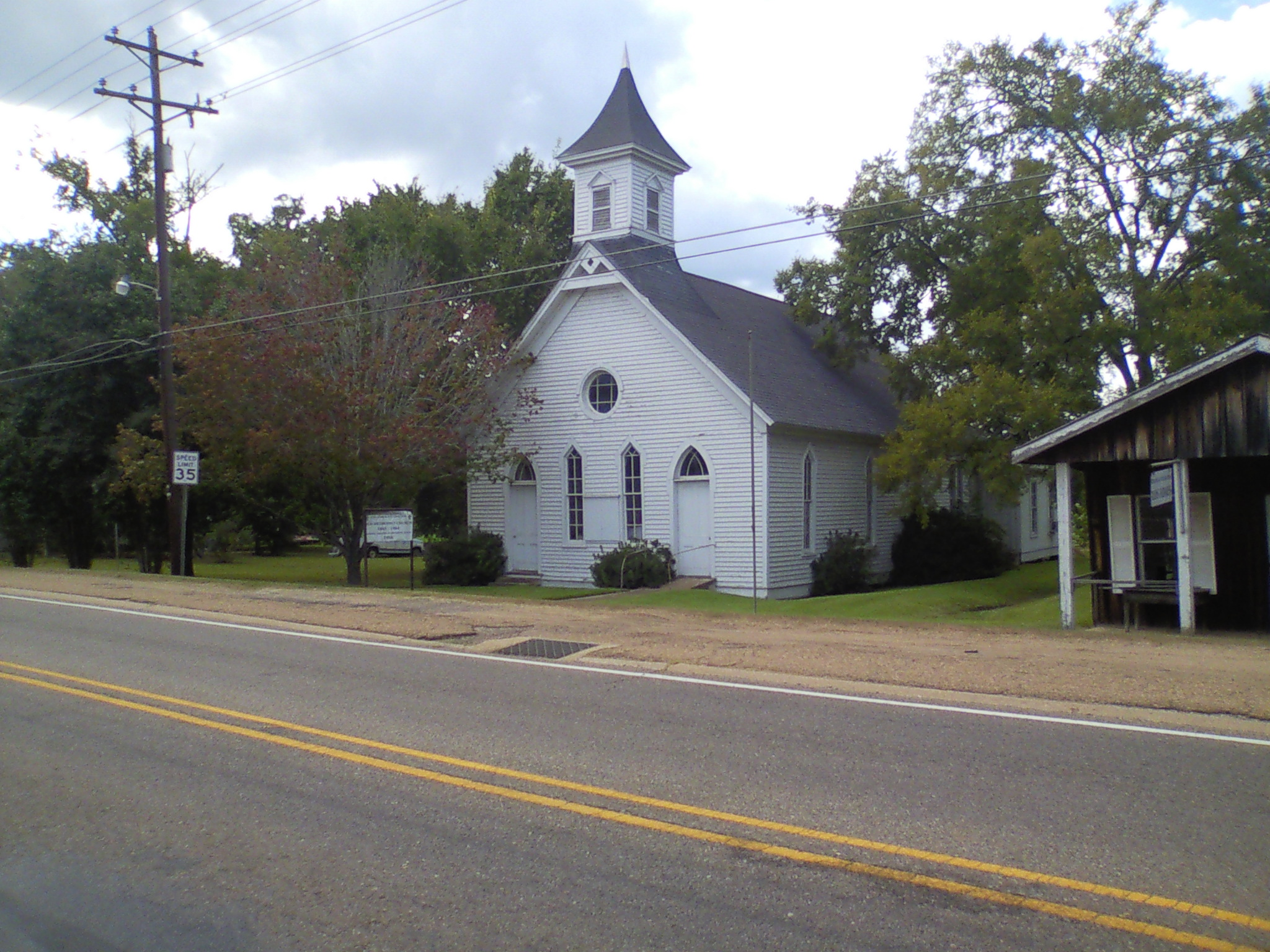
- Robeline Methodist Church off Texas Street

- Location of Robeline in Natchitoches Parish, Louisiana.

- Location within Louisiana Location within the United States
- Coordinates: 31°41′27″N 93°18′15″W
- Country: United States
- States: Louisiana
- Parish: Natchitoches

Government
  - Mayor: Bobby A. Behan (D)

Area
  - Total: 1.19 sq mi (3.08 km^{2})
  - Land: 1.19 sq mi (3.08 km^{2})
  - Water: 0 sq mi (0.00 km^{2})

Population (2020)
  - Total: 117
  - Rank: NC: 8th
  - Density: 98.3/sq mi (37.95/km^{2})
- Time zone: UTC-6 (CST)
  - Summer (DST): UTC-5 (CDT)
- Area code: 318
- FIPS code: 22-65325

Robeline is a village in western Natchitoches Parish, Louisiana, United States. The population was 117 at the 2020 census. It is part of the Natchitoches Micropolitan Statistical Area.

== History ==
The first European settlement in the area became known as Los Adaes, which served as the capital of Spanish Texas for over 50 years, from 1721 to 1773. The Spanish settlement was established at a strategic location on the border with French Louisiana to counter the growing French settlement of Natchitoches. France ceded the area to Spain in 1763 after the French and Indian War, and ten years later, Spain abandoned the settlement. Spain ceded Spanish Louisiana to France by treaty in 1800, which sold it to the United States in 1803 through the Louisiana Purchase.

The historic Keegan House, built in 1850 on the Elzey plantation, is located in Robeline.

During 1870–1917, a railroad was built through Robeline and Marthaville, Louisiana. The town became rich with resources and money, but the railroad was abandoned in 1960, and Robeline declined. It now has a convenience store, dollar store, several churches, and considerable wilderness.

In the 1880s, Robeline had a weekly newspaper, the Robeline Reporter.

According to a 2007 report, Robeline was named one of the ten worst speed traps in the state of Louisiana. Robeline made 85.73 percent of its revenue, an average of roughly $1,517 per capita population, from fines and forfeitures in the 2005 fiscal year.

== Geography ==
Robeline is located at 31°41′27″N 93°18′15″W (31.690873, -93.304233).

According to the United States Census Bureau, the village has a total area of 1.0 square miles (2.6 km^{2}), all land.

== Demographics ==
Historical population
Census	Pop.	Note	%±
1890	676		—
1900	464		−31.4%
1910	438		−5.6%
1920	495		13.0%
1930	328		−33.7%
1940	355		8.2%
1950	350		−1.4%
1960	308		−12.0%
1970	274		−11.0%
1980	238		−13.1%
1990	149		−37.4%
2000	183		22.8%
2010	174		−4.9%
2020	117		−32.8%
2025 (est.)	120	▲	2.6%
U.S. Decennial Census

As of the census of 2000, there were 183 people, 76 households, and 48 families residing in the village. The population density was 182.0 inhabitants per square mile (70.3/km^{2}). There were 97 housing units at an average density of 96.5 per square mile (37.3/km^{2}). The racial makeup of the village was 77.05% White, 17.49% African American and 5.46% Native American. Hispanic or Latino of any race were 2.19% of the population.

There were 76 households, out of which 28.9% had children under the age of 18 living with them, 46.1% were married couples living together, 14.5% had a female householder with no husband present, and 36.8% were non-families. 34.2% of all households were made up of individuals, and 15.8% had someone living alone who was 65 years of age or older. The average household size was 2.41 and the average family size was 3.13.

In the village, the population was spread out, with 25.7% under the age of 18, 6.6% from 18 to 24, 27.9% from 25 to 44, 21.3% from 45 to 64, and 18.6% who were 65 years of age or older. The median age was 38 years. For every 100 females, there were 94.7 males. For every 100 females age 18 and over, there were 103.0 males.

The median income for a household in the village was $13,036, and the median income for a family was $24,583. Males had a median income of $28,750 versus $14,375 for females. The per capita income for the village was $10,468. About 28.6% of families and 38.3% of the population were below the poverty line, including 5.9% of those under the age of eighteen and 34.0% of those 65 or over.

== Education ==
Natchitoches Parish School Board operates area public schools.

The former Robeline public school (Mascot was the Bulldogs) closed in 1980 because of a federal desegregation order. Elementary pupils were consolidated with nearby Marthaville; high schoolers were bused to Natchitoches Central High School.

== Parks and recreation ==
Robeline is home of the annual Robeline Heritage Festival held the first weekend of October. Past performers have included several local musicians as well as Percy Sledge.

The Adai Caddo Indians of Louisiana host an annual powwow at its cultural center and museum.

== St. Anne Catholic Church ==
Located on the northside of Robeline, is the historic St. Anne Catholic Church. St. Anne Catholic Church was founded as a mission and part of the St. Augustine Parish. On March 11, 1856, the mission of St. Augustine at Isle Brevelle was decreed by Bishop Auguste Martin to be a parish in its own right and assigned Fr. Francois Martin to be its first resident pastor. St. Augustine Church (also known as the Isle Brevelle Church) expanded to serve four other churches in the area, St. Charles at Bermuda, St. Joseph's at Bayou Derbonne, St. Anne's on Old River, and St. Anne's at Spanish Lake serving the Adai Caddo Indians. The church is now a mission of the St. Francis of Assisi Church, Powhatan.

== Native American Tribe ==
- Adai Caddo Indians of Louisiana, Native American tribe whose cultural center, museum, and ceremonial grounds are located in Robeline.

== Notable people ==
- Bartine Burkett, silent film actress
- Milton Joseph Cunningham, served three nonconsecutive terms as Attorney General of Louisiana prior to 1900

== See also ==
- Los Adaes
- Anne des Cadeaux
- Adai language
- Adai people
- Isle Brevelle
- Cane River
- Natchitoches Parish, Louisiana
- St. Augustine Parish (Isle Brevelle) Church
