= National Register of Historic Places listings in Sabine Parish, Louisiana =

Location of Sabine Parish in Louisiana

This is a list of the National Register of Historic Places listings in Sabine Parish, Louisiana.

This is intended to be a complete list of the properties on the National Register of Historic Places in Sabine Parish, Louisiana, United States. The locations of National Register properties for which the latitude and longitude coordinates are included below, may be seen in a map.

There are 9 properties listed on the National Register in the parish.

This National Park Service list is complete through NPS recent listings posted December 12, 2025.

== Current listings ==
	Name on the Register	Image	Date listed	Location	City or town	Description
1	Fisher Historic District	Fisher Historic District	July 27, 1979 (#79001089)	Roughly bounded by 4 L Dr., 3rd Ave., and S. 2nd and North Sts. 31°29′36″N 93°27′54″W	Fisher	
2	Fort Jesup	Fort Jesup	October 15, 1966 (#66000381)	7 miles northeast of Many on Louisiana Highway 6 at Fort Jesup State Monument; 31°36′41″N 93°24′03″W	Many vicinity	
3	Hodges Gardens	Hodges Gardens	July 15, 2015 (#14001173)	1000 Hodges Loop; 31°22′09″N 93°25′29″W	Florien vicinity	
4	Kansas City Southern Depot, Zwolle	Kansas City Southern Depot, Zwolle	August 7, 1989 (#89001041)	Spanish and Port Arthur Sts. 31°37′50″N 93°38′36″W	Zwolle	
5	Kansas City Southern Railway Depot	Kansas City Southern Railway Depot	September 22, 2000 (#00001146)	750 W. Georgia Ave. 31°33′56″N 93°29′03″W	Many	
6	McNeely Hotel	McNeely Hotel	May 30, 1996 (#96000606)	690 San Antonio Ave. 31°34′05″N 93°29′02″W	Many	
7	J.M. Miller and Brother Store	J.M. Miller and Brother Store	May 23, 1997 (#97000465)	7886 Louisiana Highway 473; 31°18′08″N 93°32′08″W	Florien vicinity	
8	Sabine High School		March 17, 2020 (#100005099)	850 Highland Ave. 31°34′17″N 93°28′27″W	Many	
9	Stoker House	Stoker House	June 23, 1976 (#76000975)	Northeast of Many; 31°37′26″N 93°23′07″W	Many vicinity	Dates from 1848

== See also ==
- List of National Historic Landmarks in Louisiana
- National Register of Historic Places listings in Louisiana
