= Kansas City Southern Depot =

Kansas City Southern Depot may refer to:

- Kansas City Southern Depot (DeQuincy, Louisiana)
- Kansas City Southern Depot (Leesville, Louisiana)
- Kansas City Southern Depot (Mansfield, Louisiana), a National Register of Historic Places listing in DeSoto Parish, Louisiana
- Kansas City Southern Railway Depot (Many, Louisiana)
- Kansas City Southern Depot (Vivian, Louisiana)
- Kansas City Southern Depot, Zwolle, Louisiana
- Kansas City Southern Railway Building (Kansas City, Missouri)

== See also ==
- Kansas City Southern Railroad Bridge, Cross Bayou, Shreveport, Louisiana
