= Sabine High School (Louisiana) =

High school in Many, Louisiana (1957–1970)

- U.S. National Register of Historic Places
- Location within Louisiana
- Location: 850 Highland Ave., Many, Louisiana, U.S.
- Coordinates: 31.5715°N 93.4741°W
- NRHP reference No.: 100005099
- Added to NRHP: March 17, 2020

Sabine High School (1957–1970) was a public school for African American students located at 850 Highland Avenue, in Many, Sabine Parish, Louisiana.

== History ==
Built in 1957, the school served kindergarten to 12th grade African American students during a time of segregation. Architects Seymour Van Os and Theodore Flaxman designed the building.

The school buildings succeeded a Rosenwald School built in 1928, called the Sabine Parish Training School. The basketball team won the state championship for the State of Louisiana in 1947.

== Closure and legacy ==
After desegregation in 1970, it became the Many Junior High School, which closed in 2001. It was listed on the National Register of Historic Places in 2020. A historical marker was added to the site in 2022.

== See also ==
- National Register of Historic Places listings in Sabine Parish, Louisiana
- Sabine Parish School Board
- Sabine Normal and Industrial Institute
