= Sabine Free State Festival =

Annual festival in Florien, Louisiana, U.S.

The annual Sabine Free State Festival takes place the first weekend of November in the Village of Florien, Louisiana. Florien is located in the southern tip of Sabine Parish, which was once part of the "Neutral Strip".

== Origins in the neutral strip ==
The Neutral Strip was an area of land that the American government and the Spanish government both claimed. On November 6, 1806, General Wilkinson and Colonel Simon De Herrera signed an agreement to stay out of the strip until a proper boundary could be determined. The area became known as the "Free State" and a sanctuary for outlaws. The most notorious outlaw was John Murrell. Murrell and his clan would rob and kill any large parties that would cross the strip. One member in Murrell's clan was Hiriam Midkiff. Rumor has it that the Spanish had gold mines located near Clear Water Baptist Church just outside the city limits of present-day Florien. Murrell, Midkiff, and other clan members stole the gold, and hid it in the caves also located in this area. Mr. Walter Bruce wrote a book called The Bandit of Murrell's Caves, which tells the story. The Neutral Strip ended on March 28, 1822, when General Zachary Taylor was given orders to build Fort Jessup; the Fort was built just outside present day Many, in Sabine Parish.

== Activities ==
The town of Florien held the first Free State Festival in November 1981. The festival has a treasure hunt for Midkiff's treasure, which could be located in the town, or up to 10 miles from the town. Clues are given every day to help locate the missing treasure; a savings bond is the prize. The town has a syrup mill in the center of square. Syrup is made from sugar cane and sold during the festival. There are several old buildings that have been donated to the town, and a saloon used for the shoot-outs. During the shoot-out, the participants are dressed for the period, and Hiriam Midkiff always shows up. Needless to say, the sheriff takes him down. Everyone has fun, and enjoys the street dance and firework show, which signifies the end of the festival.

This festival went on hiatus in 2020.
