= Sabine Normal and Industrial Institute =

School in Converse, Louisiana (1903–1928)

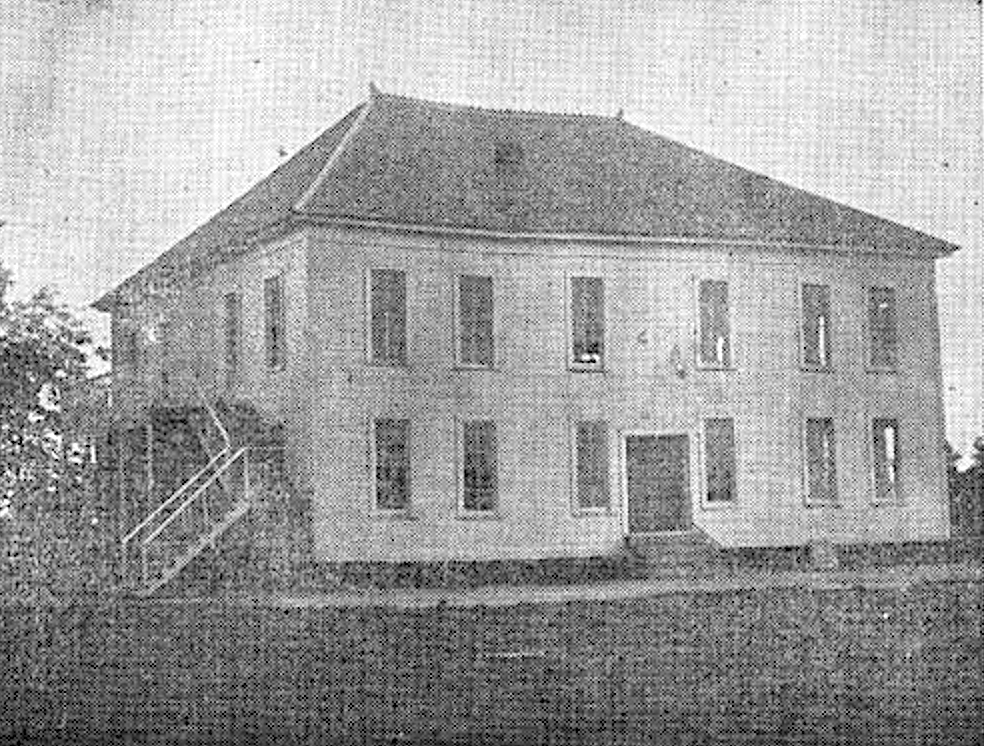

Location
- Saline Road, Converse, Louisiana, U.S. 31.7292°N 93.7383°W

Information
- Former name: Sabine Industrial Institute (1918–1928)
- Type: Black Private (1903–1917); Black Public (1917–1928)
- Established: November 2, 1903
- Founder: Robert Edward Jacobs
- Closed: 1928

Sabine Normal and Industrial Institute (1903–1928) was a normal school and vocational school for African American students in Converse, Louisiana. It was also known as Sabine Industrial Institute.

== History ==
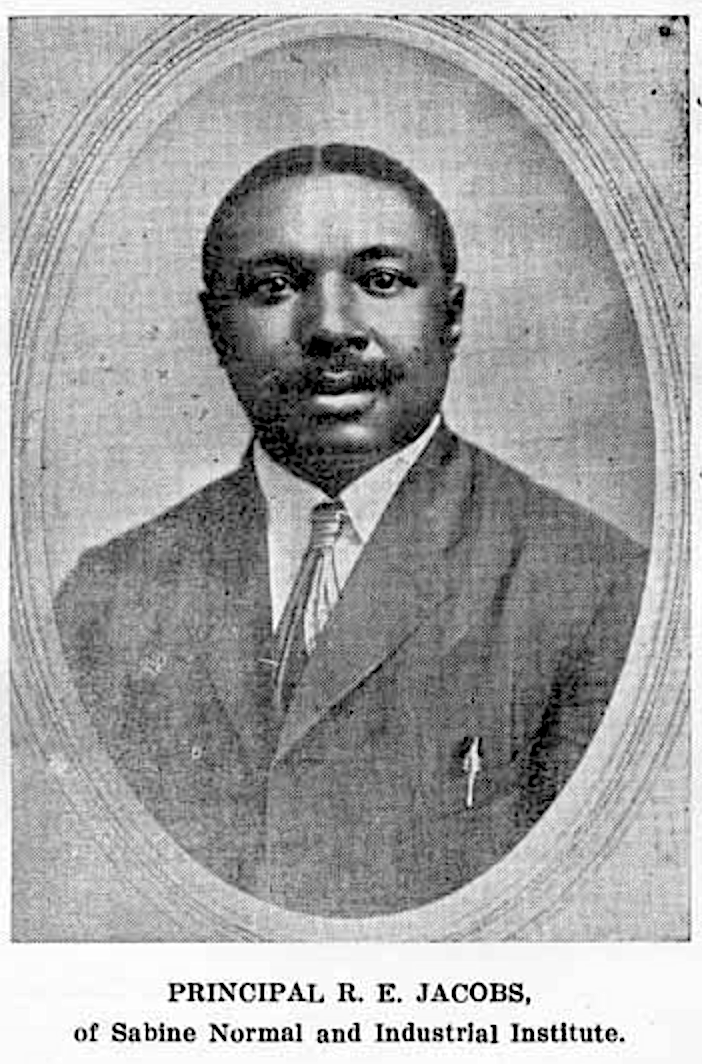
R. E. Jacobs, founder and principal

The African-American neighborhood in Converse, Louisiana was known as Babsoline. The first Black school in Converse was established by W. B. Purvis.

The Sabine Normal and Industrial Institute was founded on November 2, 1903, by professor Robert Edward Jacobs (May 22, 1877 – February 17, 1917). Jacobs was a graduate from Coleman College. After Jacobs died in 1917, S. B. Belton served as the principal.

The land for the school campus was donated by the Black community of Converse. The campus of the school was once physically surrounded by the Saline Baptist Church, however the church was not a part of the school.

The school offered classes in teacher training, blacksmithing, vocational agriculture, domestic science, and wheelwrighting. M. L. (Mary Lee) Jacobs, Jacobs' wife and a fellow Coleman grad, taught domestic science. Lillie Mae Baddie taught music, and A. J. Jones taught agriculture.

In 1918, The school was turned over to the Sabine Parish School Board and the school name was changed to Sabine Industrial Institute. It closed in 1928. A historical marker commemorates the school's history.

== See also ==
- Sabine High School (Louisiana)
