= Hodges Gardens State Park =

Former state park in Louisiana, United States

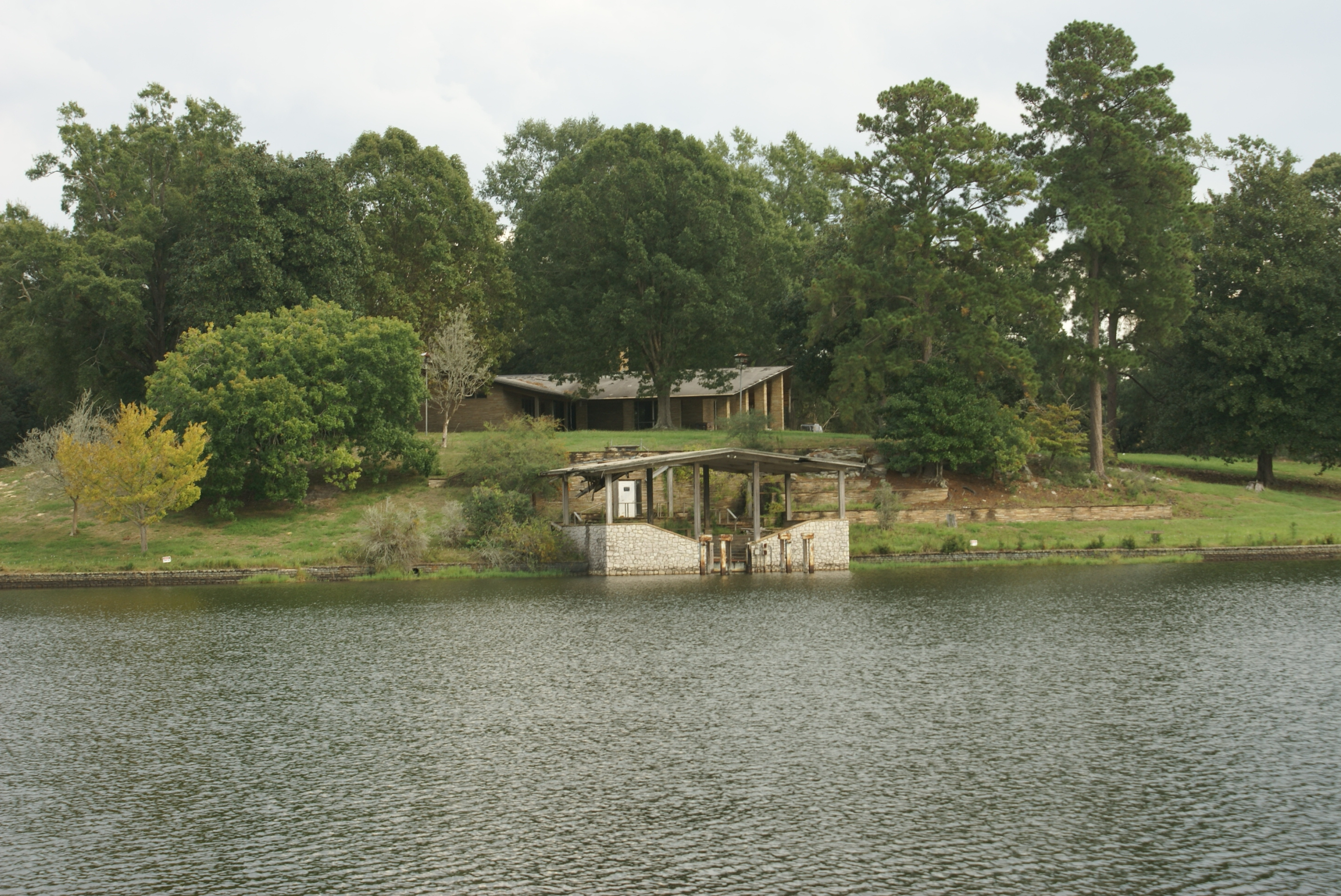
- A view of A. J. Hodges Island.

- Location within Louisiana
- Location: 1000 Hodges Loop, Sabine Parish, Louisiana, United States of America
- Coordinates: 31.36921°N 93.4248183°W
- Area: approx. 700 acres (2.8 km^{2}; 1.1 sq mi)
- Established: 1956
- Governing body: Louisiana Office of State Parks
- Website: www.crt.state.la.us/parks/ihodges.aspx

- Hodges Gardens
- U.S. National Register of Historic Places
- NRHP reference No.: 14001173
- Added to NRHP: July 15, 2015

Hodges Gardens State Park, previously known as Hodges Gardens, Park and Wilderness Area, was located on 4,700 acres (19 km^{2}) between Florien and Hornbeck, near the Toledo Bend Reservoir of the Sabine River in Sabine Parish, in west central Louisiana. The park was located on U.S. Highway 171 some fifteen miles (24 km) south of Many, the seat of Sabine Parish. The facility offered walking trails, formal gardens, arboretum, the Azalea Overlook, waterfalls, and a visitor center. Originally, privately developed during the 1940s and opened to the public in 1956. The park was formally dedicated on May 1, 1959, and transferred to a non-profit foundation in 1960. In April 2007, it became part of the Louisiana public parks system. It is the largest horticultural park and recreation area in the United States and with the acquisition Hodges Garden became the newest park in Louisiana.

As of February 20, 2018, ownership of Hodge's Garden State Park was transferred to the A. J. and Nona Trigg Hodges Foundation and closed. The park remains closed with no plans of reopening.

== History ==
The area was once home to bands of Native Americans, Spanish and French explorers, and highwaymen that were prominent during the time of the Neutral Strip (Louisiana). A road known as the El Camino Real, or the King's Highway, passed through what became Hodges Garden, and across the Sabine River at Gain's Ferry. It originated in Natchitoches, crossed west central Louisiana, through Texas to Mexico City.

Andrew Jackson Hodges Sr. (1890–1966), a native of Cotton Valley in Webster Parish, purchased more than 100,000 acres (400 km^{2}) of cut-over barren land and replanted 39,000 acres (160 km^{2}) in timber. The land included an old quarry. Hodges and his wife, the former Nona Trigg, planned a scenic garden around the natural rock formations. The quarry had been used to supply rocks, stones, and sandstone to build, among other things, the jetties in Port Arthur. Work began on the jetties in 1898; material from the quarry was delivered by wagon that would have been at least a six-day round trip. Water from a 225-acre (0.91 km^{2}) lake created in 1954 is pumped through the gardens to waterfalls, pools, a geyser, fountains, and to the watering system before it is recycled back into the lake.

In 2015, Hodges Gardens was listed on the National Register of Historic Places.

== Park features ==
The park included 925 acres (3.74 km^{2}) referred to as Hodges Gardens and featured 60 acres (240,000 m^{2}) of gardens, a 225-acre (0.9 km^{2}) area, which included a lighthouse, bass fishing lake, hiking and biking trails, and RV and wilderness camping.

=== Services and amenities ===
- Amphitheater
- Bicycle Riding
- Bird Watching
- Boating (Boat rental)
- Cabins
- Lodge (Accommodates up to 52)
- Canoeing (Canoe Rental)
- Fishing (Fishing Pier)
- Hiking
- Kayaking (Kayak Rental)
- Lookout Tower
- Pavilion
- Picnicking
- Tent Area
- Walking
- Waterfall
- Wildlife Viewing

== Things to see ==
Many plants and flowers were grown in tropical greenhouses on the property and some flowers like tulips, hyacinths, & daffodils were imported to add variety for visitors. Flowers were planted on one level above another. Views of water lilies, Neoregelia, Holly Berries. In December 2007 a reported 600 Rose bushes were planted. Easter Sunrise Services, Shakespearean Plays, concerts, Fourth of July Fireworks and more were planned.

There were walkways, foot bridges, streams, waterfalls, overlooks including the lookout tower, and more. From the overlook, Texas, more than 14 miles (23 km) away, could be viewed. A dual stairway had a cascading waterfall down the center, many fountains spewing water into the air, and trees adorned with Spanish moss.

=== Pictures from the gardens ===
Hodges Gardens State Park
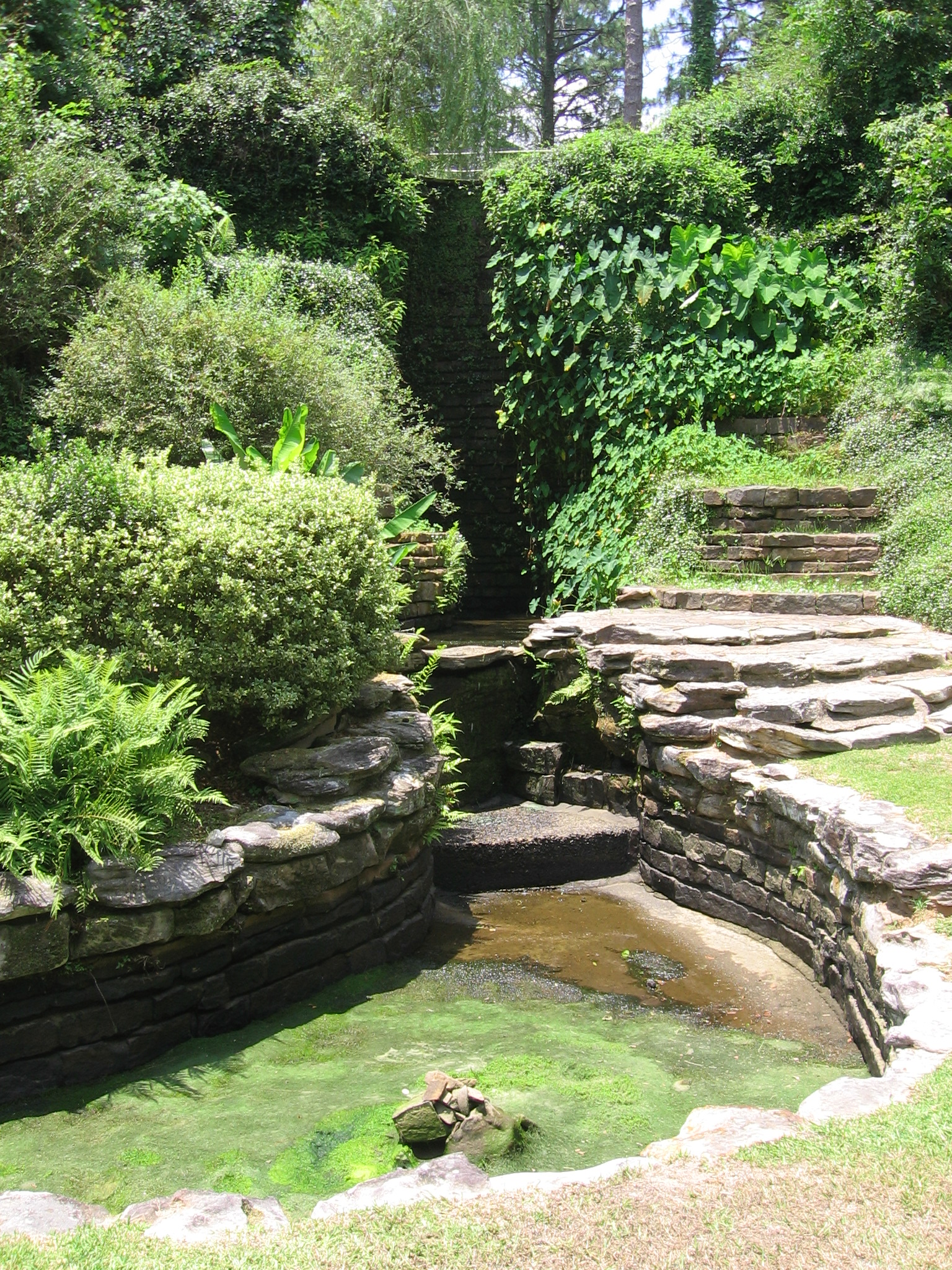
A dried-up waterfall.

A flourishing, blue waterlily.

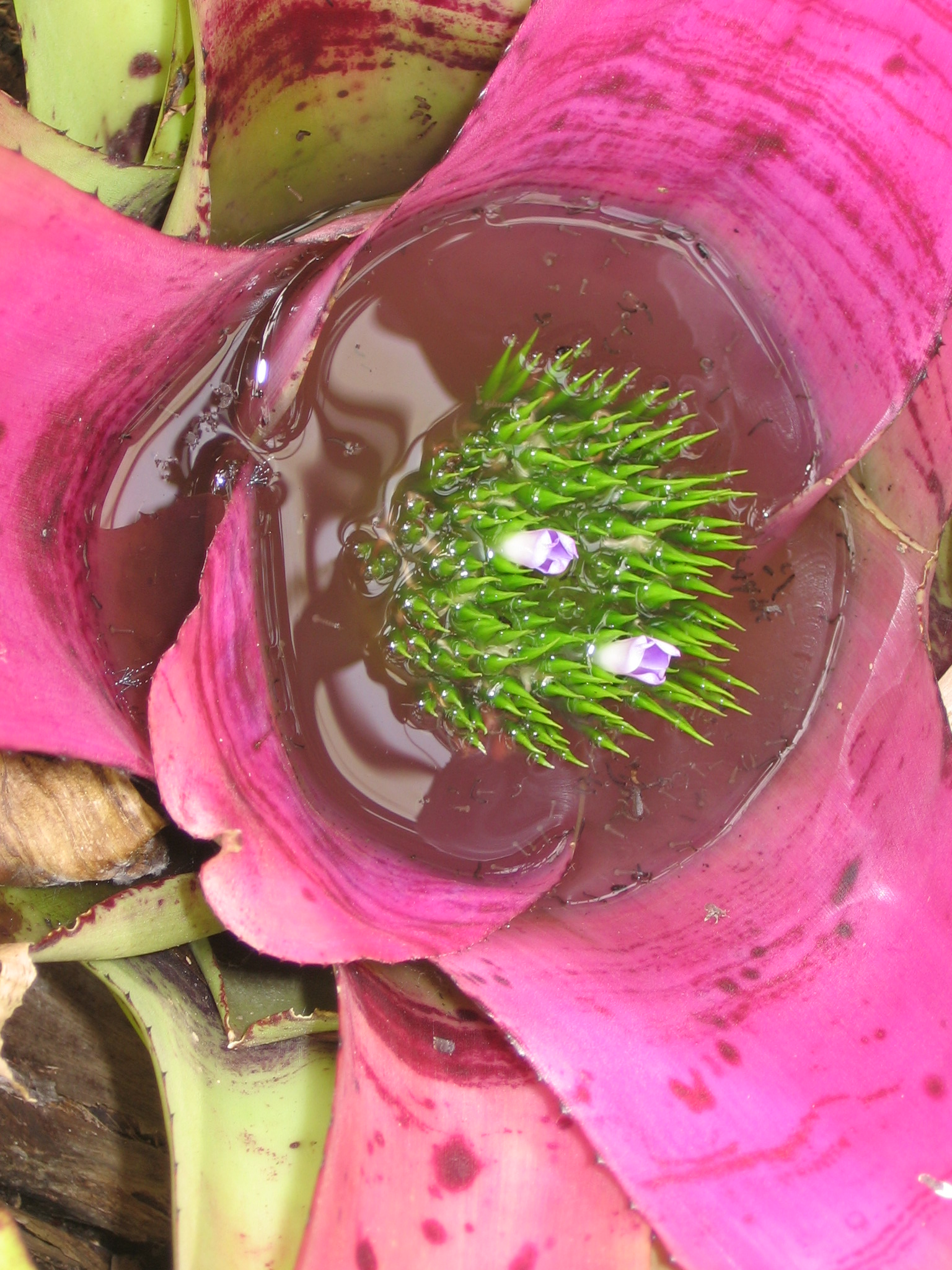
This Neoregelia collects water that sustains other plants.

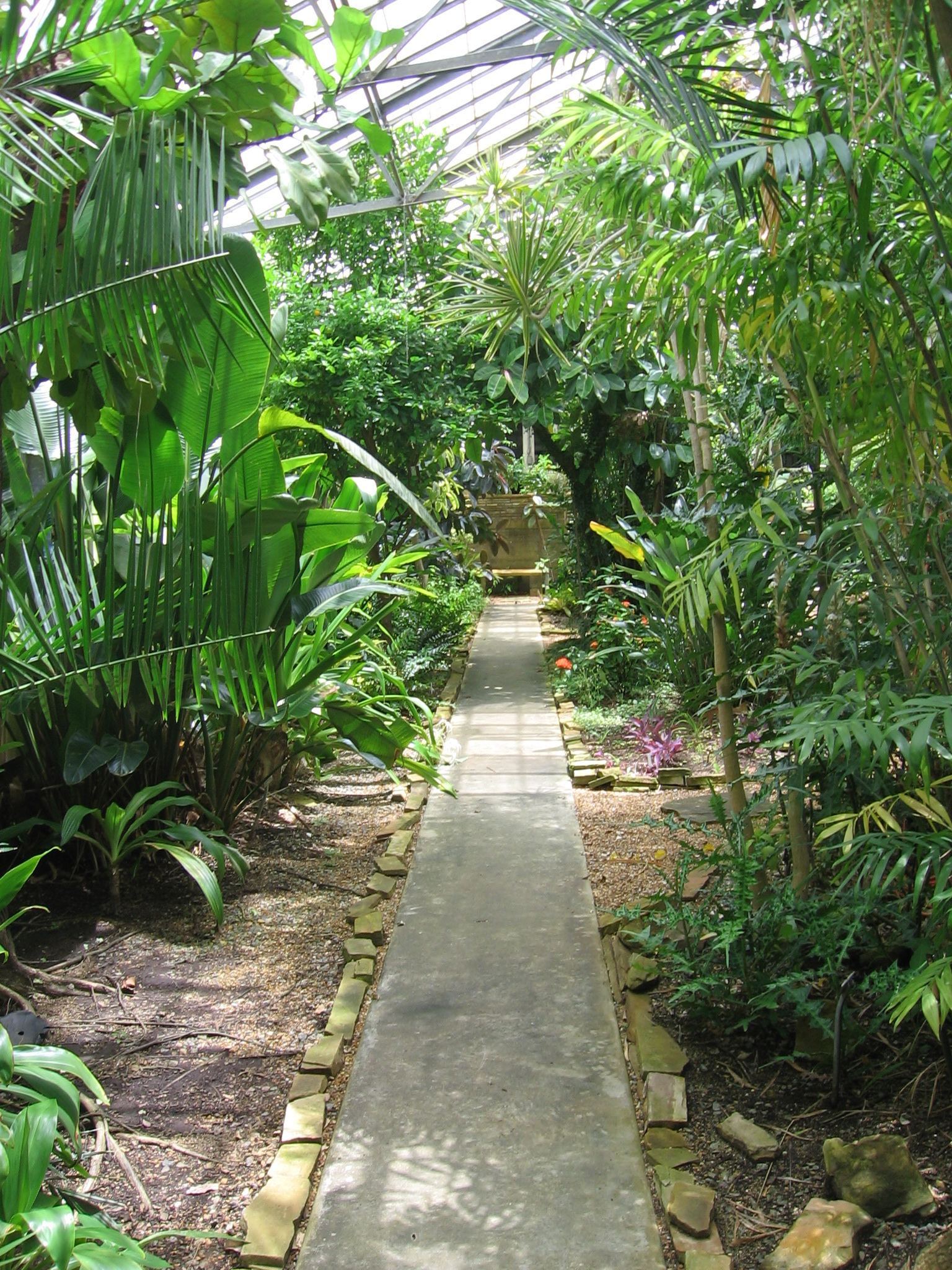
One of Hodges Gardens large, tropical greenhouses.

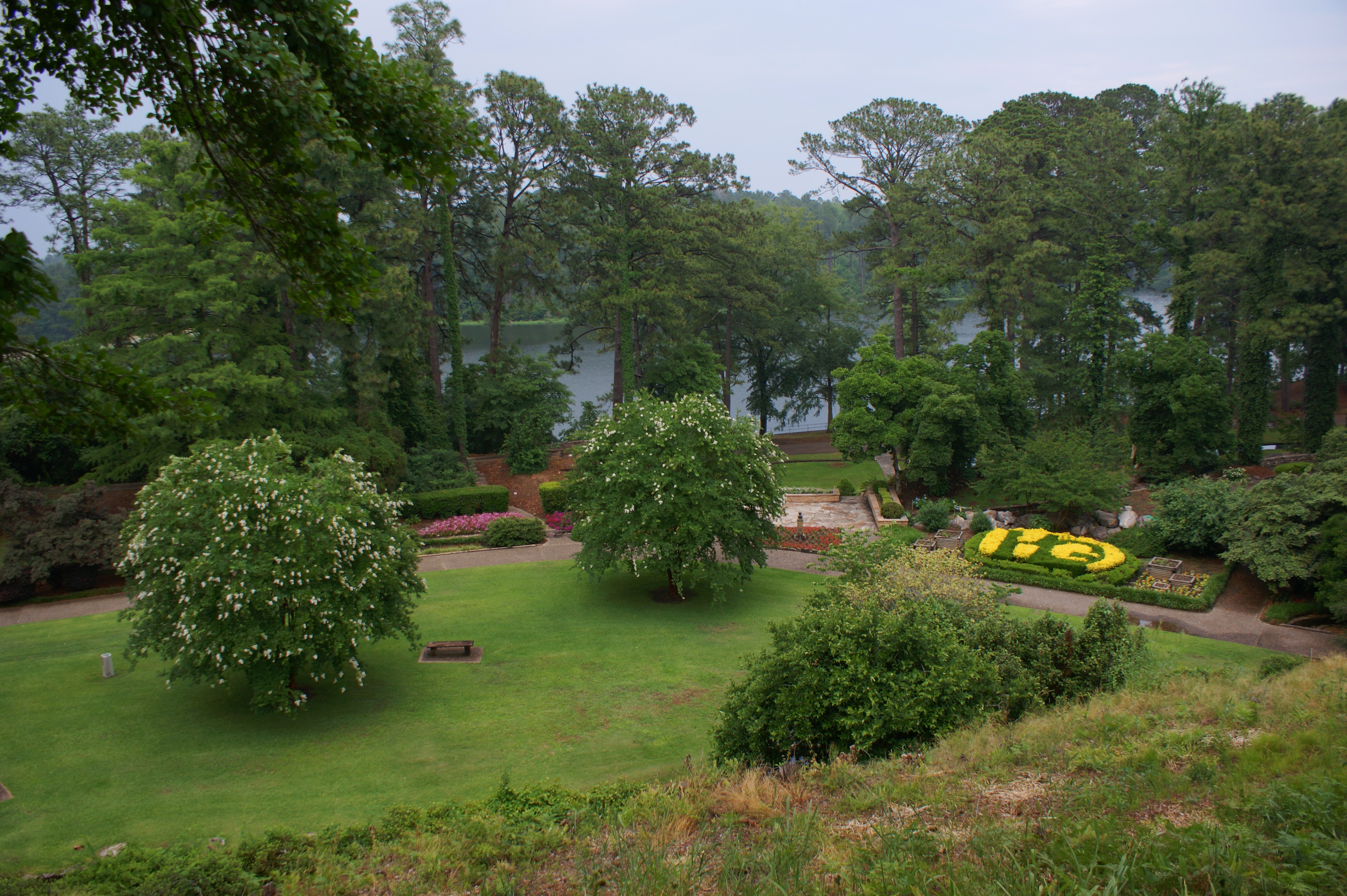
Scenery at the park.

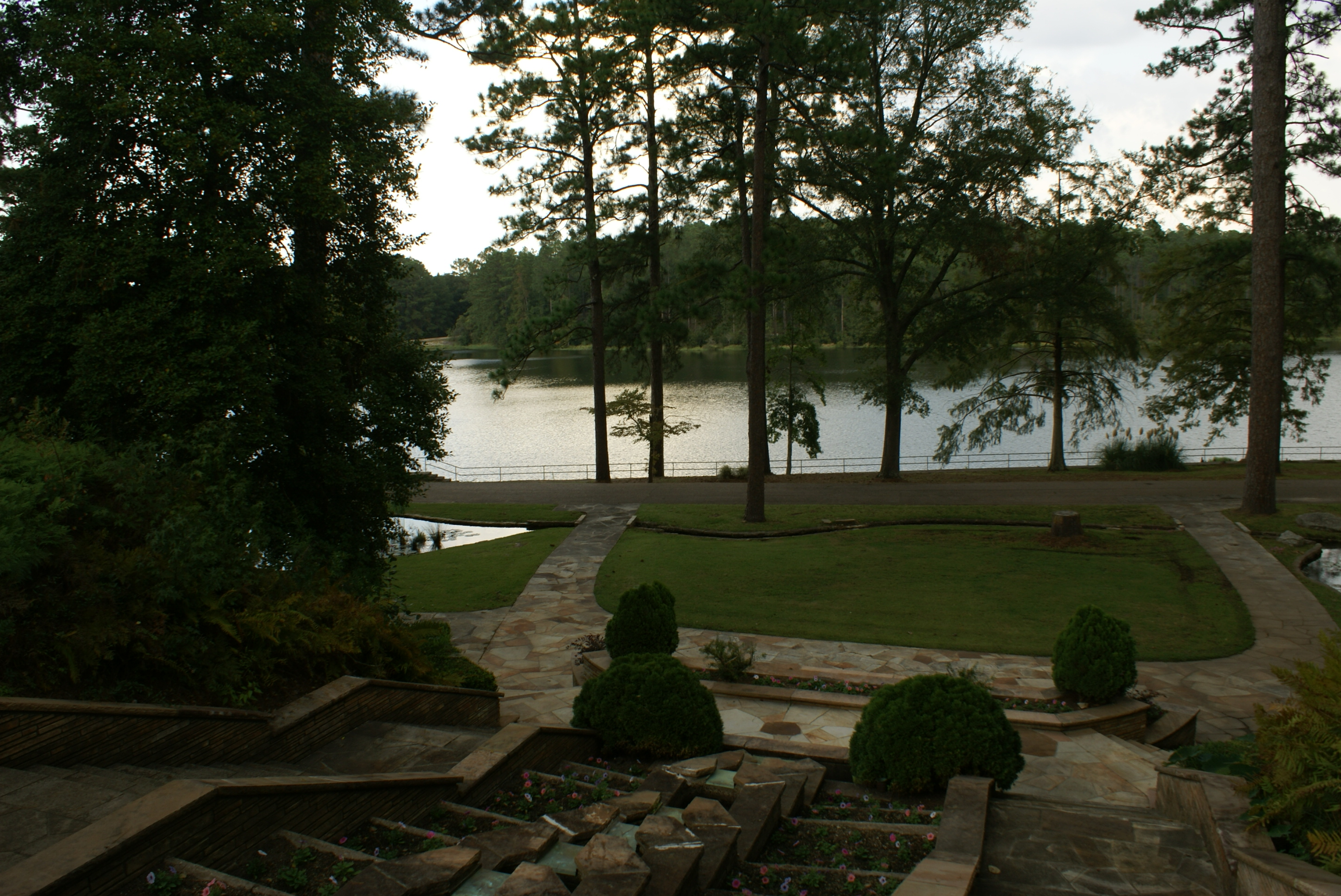
View of the lake from the terraces.

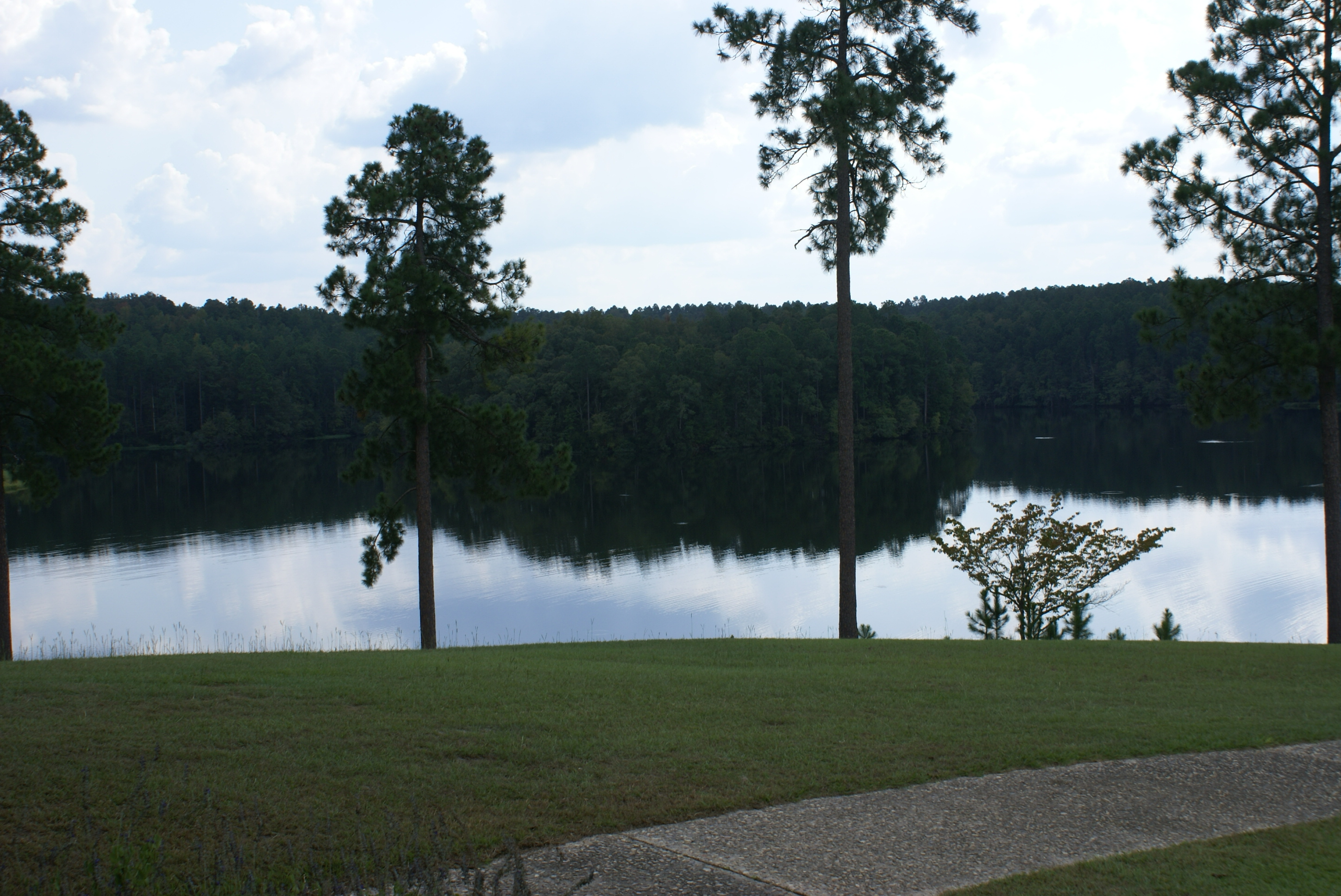
A view of the lake in the park from the waterfront.

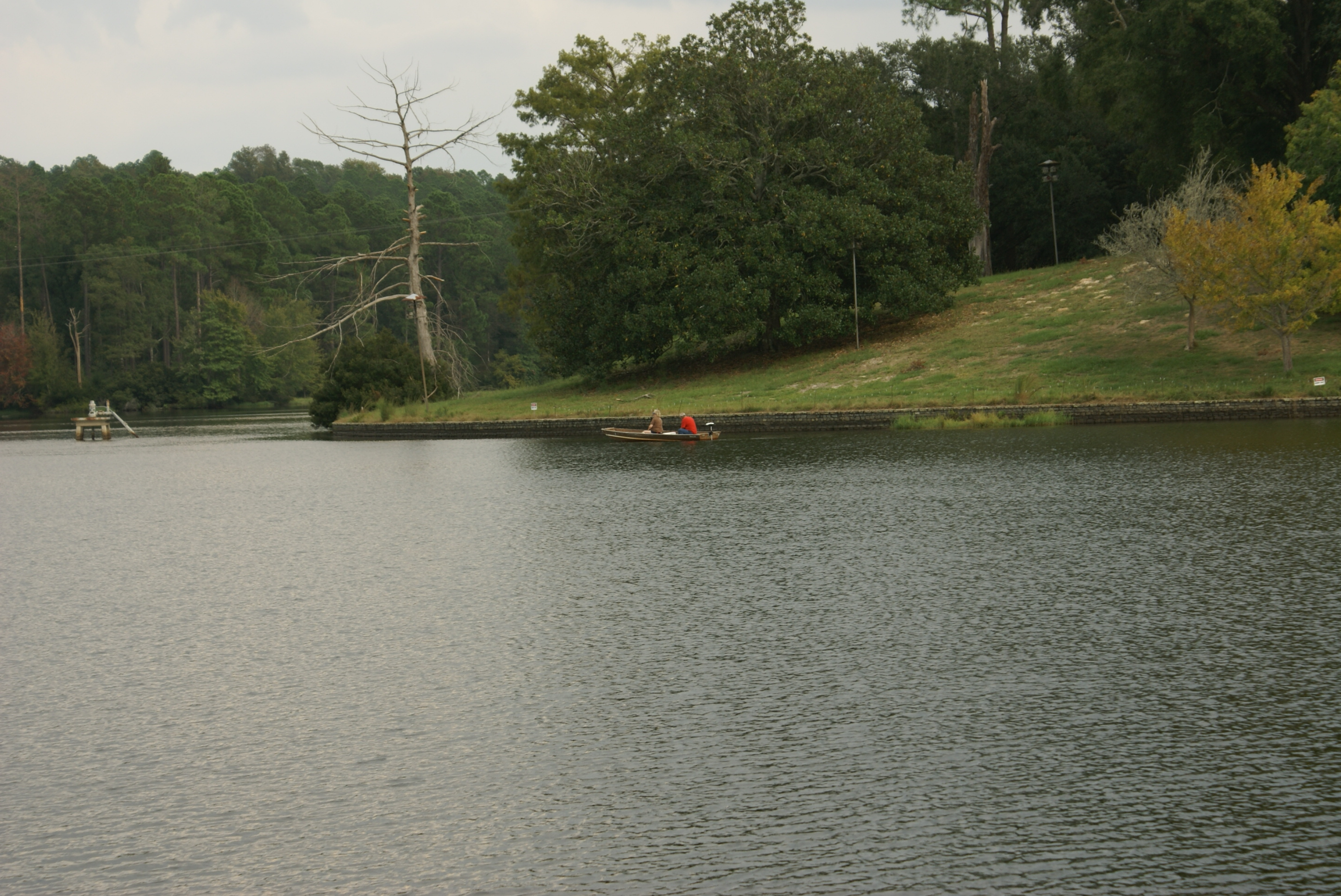
Boaters on the lake.

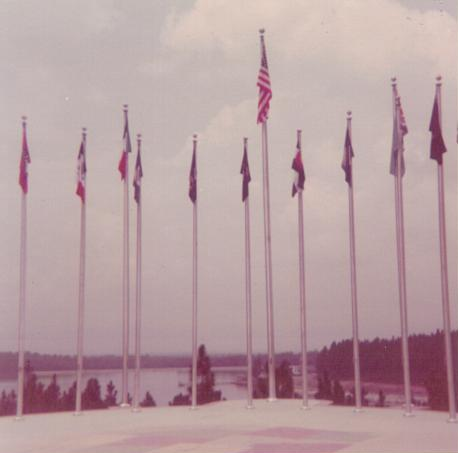
Flagpoles at Hodges Gardens (September 1972)

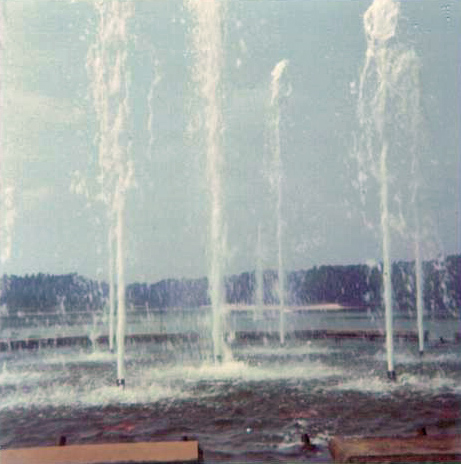
Fountains at Hodges Gardens

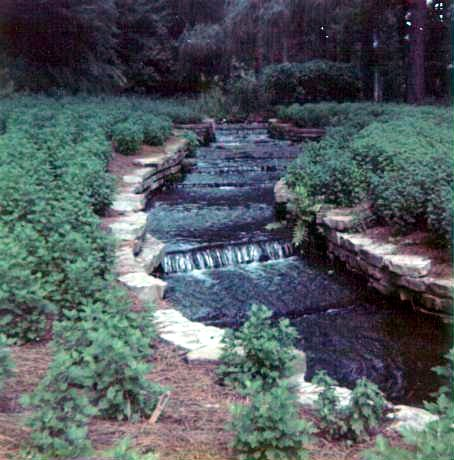
A cascading waterway at Hodges Gardens

== Returning the gardens to the foundation ==
After a half century of operations, the gardens and cabins were refurbished by the state and opened to the public on March 20, 2008. Camping facilities became available a few months thereafter. But after nine years, the State, with a tight budget, chose not to continue to operate Hodges Gardens. Instead, the Louisiana Department of Culture, Recreation & Tourism and the Office of State Parks returned ownership to the A. J. and Nona Triggs Foundation.

Mayor Kenneth Freeman of Many and private preservation groups have sought to preserve Hodges Gardens, which Freeman indicated he has visited several times a year since 1964, when he was eight years of age. "Every time I go I see something new and beautiful. I don't want to lose that for future generations, not to mention the economic impact it would have on our local economies," Freeman said. He urged area residents to patronize the park on a regular basis.

== See also ==
- National Register of Historic Places listings in Sabine Parish, Louisiana
