= Many station =

- Kansas City Southern Railway Depot
- U.S. National Register of Historic Places
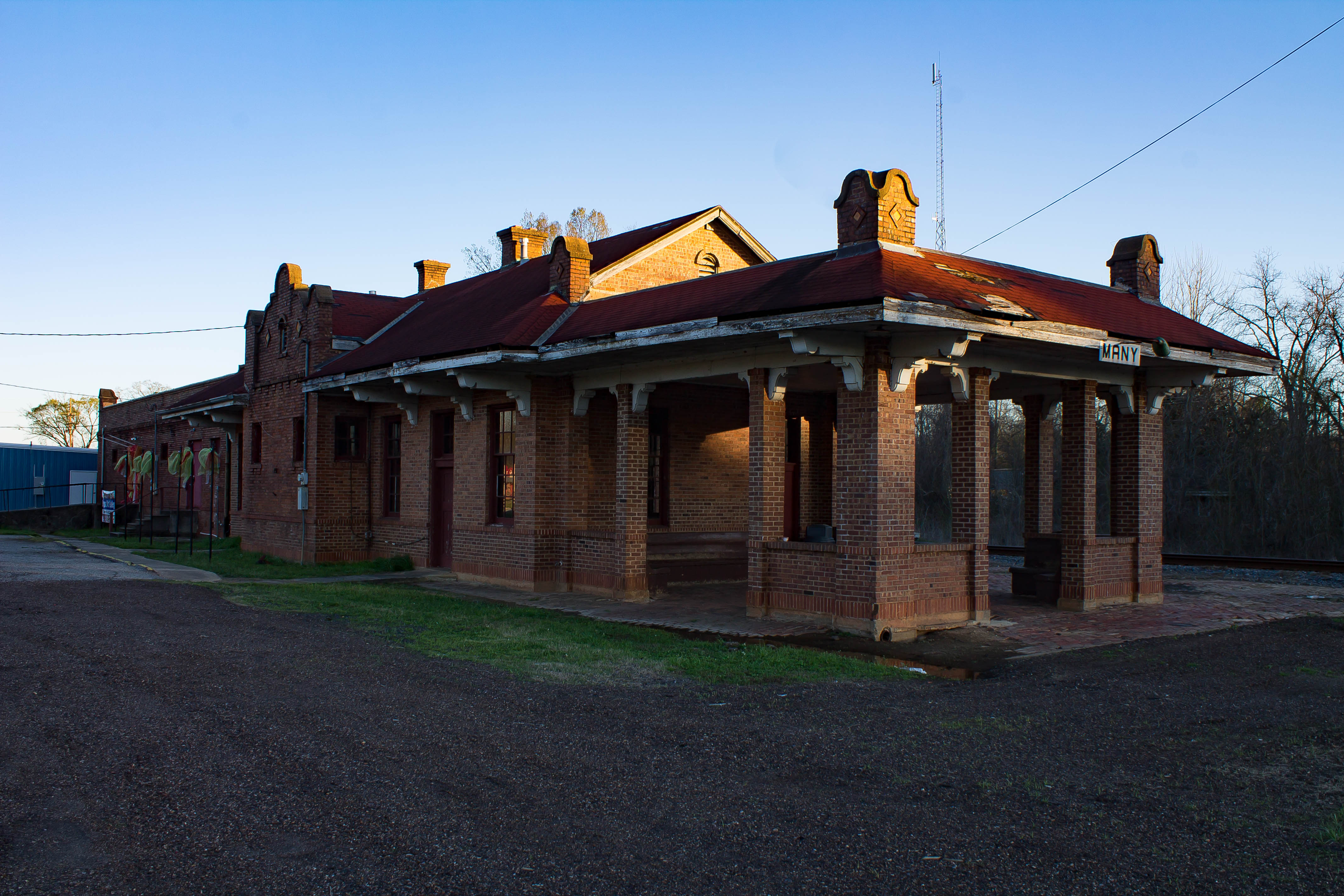

- Location within Louisiana Location within the United States
- Location: 750 W. Georgia Ave., Many, Louisiana
- Coordinates: 31°33′56″N 93°29′3″W
- Area: less than one acre
- Built: 1929
- Architectural style: Spanish Colonial Revival
- NRHP reference No.: 00001146
- Added to NRHP: September 22, 2000

The Kansas City Southern Railway Depot is a historic former Kansas City Southern Railway station located at 750 West Georgia Avenue in Many, Louisiana. The depot was built in 1929 to replace the original depot, which opened in 1896 when the railroad was completed through the town. The Spanish Colonial Revival building features arched parapets atop projecting walls and corner piers with curved decorative pieces on top. Many's economy and municipal government were revitalized by the railway's completion, and the station brought both passengers and freight to and from the town. The local lumber industry, the chief export of Sabine Parish, shipped its products out through the station, and a small business district grew around the station.

The station was added to the National Register of Historic Places on September 22, 2000. At the time, it was used by the Sabine Council on Aging.

== See also ==
- Kansas City Southern Depot (Zwolle, Louisiana)
- Kansas City Southern Railway Locomotive No. 73D and Caboose No. 385
- National Register of Historic Places listings in Sabine Parish, Louisiana

Preceding station	Kansas City Southern Railway	Following station
Loring toward Kansas City	Main Line	Fisher toward Port Arthur
