= Ron Tompkins =

Ron Tompkins may refer to:

- Ron Tompkins (baseball) (1944–2023), American MLB pitcher
- Ronald G. Tompkins (1951–2022), American physician, academic, and university professor of surgery
