= Zwolle station (Louisiana) =

- Kansas City Southern Depot, Zwolle
- U.S. National Register of Historic Places
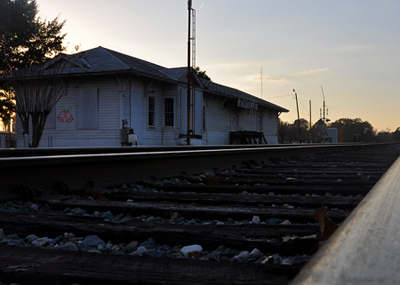

- Location within Louisiana Location within the United States
- Location: Spanish and Port Arthur Sts., Zwolle, Louisiana
- Coordinates: 31°37′50″N 93°38′36″W
- Area: less than one acre
- NRHP reference No.: 89001041
- Added to NRHP: August 7, 1989

The Kansas City Southern Depot is a former Kansas City Southern Railway station located at the intersection of Spanish and Port Arthur Streets in Zwolle, Louisiana. Built in 1914, the depot is the only surviving building connected to the railroad in Zwolle. The railroad was built through the Zwolle area in 1896, and the town was founded shortly thereafter; the 1914 depot was a replacement for the town's original station. The railway station was an important shipping center for the town's lumber industry; lumber was Sabine Parish's chief export from the early 1900s through the 1940s, and the railroad made Zwolle one of the two main milling towns in the parish.

The depot was added to the National Register of Historic Places on August 7, 1989.

== See also ==
- Kansas City Southern Depot (Many, Louisiana)
- Kansas City Southern Railway Locomotive No. 73D and Caboose No. 385
- National Register of Historic Places listings in Sabine Parish, Louisiana

Preceding station	Kansas City Southern Railway	Following station
Noble toward Kansas City	Main Line	Loring toward Port Arthur
