= Converse, Louisiana =

- Village
- Village of Converse
- Location of Converse in Sabine Parish, Louisiana.

- Location within Louisiana Location within the United States
- Coordinates: 31°46′46″N 93°42′00″W
- Country: United States
- State: Louisiana
- Parish: Sabine

Area
  - Total: 2.18 sq mi (5.65 km^{2})
  - Land: 2.18 sq mi (5.65 km^{2})
  - Water: 0 sq mi (0.00 km^{2})
- Elevation: 272 ft (83 m)

Population (2020)
  - Total: 379
  - Density: 174/sq mi (67.1/km^{2})
- Time zone: UTC-6 (CST)
  - Summer (DST): UTC-5 (CDT)
- Zip Code: 71419
- Area Code: 318
- FIPS code: 22-17215
- GNIS feature ID: 2407437

Converse is a village in Sabine Parish, Louisiana, United States. As of the 2020 census, Converse had a population of 379.

== History ==
Converse was home to a community of African Americans referred to as Babsolina and the Sabine Normal and Industrial Institute, a normal and vocational school for African Americans.

== Geography ==
According to the United States Census Bureau, the village has a total area of 2.1 square miles (5.4 km^{2}), all land.

=== Climate ===
Climate is characterized by relatively high temperatures and evenly distributed precipitation throughout the year According to the Köppen Climate Classification system, Converse has a humid subtropical climate, abbreviated "Cfa" on climate maps.

Climate data for Converse, Louisiana
| Month | Jan | Feb | Mar | Apr | May | Jun | Jul | Aug | Sep | Oct | Nov | Dec | Year |
|---|---|---|---|---|---|---|---|---|---|---|---|---|---|
| Mean daily maximum °C (°F) | 14 (57) | 17 (62) | 21 (69) | 24 (76) | 28 (83) | 32 (89) | 34 (93) | 34 (93) | 31 (88) | 26 (79) | 20 (68) | 15 (59) | 24 (76) |
| Mean daily minimum °C (°F) | 2 (35) | 3 (38) | 7 (45) | 11 (51) | 16 (60) | 19 (67) | 21 (70) | 20 (68) | 17 (63) | 11 (51) | 6 (43) | 2 (36) | 11 (52) |
| Average precipitation mm (inches) | 120 (4.7) | 120 (4.6) | 120 (4.9) | 110 (4.2) | 140 (5.6) | 110 (4.2) | 89 (3.5) | 61 (2.4) | 97 (3.8) | 100 (4.1) | 100 (4.1) | 130 (5.2) | 1,300 (51.2) |
Source: Weatherbase

== Demographics ==
Historical population
| Census | Pop. | Note | %± |
|---|---|---|---|
| 1930 | 291 | | — |
| 1940 | 314 | | 7.9% |
| 1950 | 311 | | −1.0% |
| 1960 | 291 | | −6.4% |
| 1970 | 375 | | 28.9% |
| 1980 | 449 | | 19.7% |
| 1990 | 436 | | −2.9% |
| 2000 | 400 | | −8.3% |
| 2010 | 440 | | 10.0% |
| 2020 | 379 | | −13.9% |
| 2025 (est.) | 383 | ▲ | 1.1% |
U.S. Decennial Census

=== 2020 census ===
Converse racial composition
| Race | Number | Percentage |
|---|---|---|
| White (non-Hispanic) | 310 | 81.79% |
| Black or African American (non-Hispanic) | 10 | 2.64% |
| Native American | 36 | 9.5% |
| Other/Mixed | 17 | 4.49% |
| Hispanic or Latino | 6 | 1.58% |

As of the 2020 United States census, there were 379 people, 125 households, and 84 families residing in the village.

=== 2000 census ===
As of the census of 2000, there were 400 people, 166 households, and 111 families residing in the village. The population density was 187.7 inhabitants per square mile (72.5/km^{2}). There were 202 housing units at an average density of 94.8 per square mile (36.6/km^{2}). The racial makeup of the village was 79.50% White, 8.75% African American, 7.75% Native American, and 4.00% from two or more races. Hispanic or Latino of any race were 6.00% of the population.

There were 166 households, out of which 30.1% had children under the age of 18 living with them, 48.2% were married couples living together, 13.9% had a female householder with no husband present, and 33.1% were non-families. 30.7% of all households were made up of individuals, and 16.9% had someone living alone who was 65 years of age or older. The average household size was 2.41 and the average family size was 3.02.

In the village, the population was spread out, with 29.0% under the age of 18, 7.5% from 18 to 24, 26.3% from 25 to 44, 22.8% from 45 to 64, and 14.5% who were 65 years of age or older. The median age was 36 years. For every 100 females, there were 87.8 males. For every 100 females age 18 and over, there were 75.3 males.

The median income for a household in the village was $25,250, and the median income for a family was $31,875. Males had a median income of $31,058 versus $20,000 for females. The per capita income for the village was $13,180. About 23.1% of families and 29.3% of the population were below the poverty line, including 52.5% of those under age 18 and 23.1% of those age 65 or over.

== Education ==
Public schools in Sabine Parish are operated by the Sabine Parish School Board. The village of Converse is zoned to Converse High School (Grades PK-12).
