= Fisher, Louisiana =

- Village
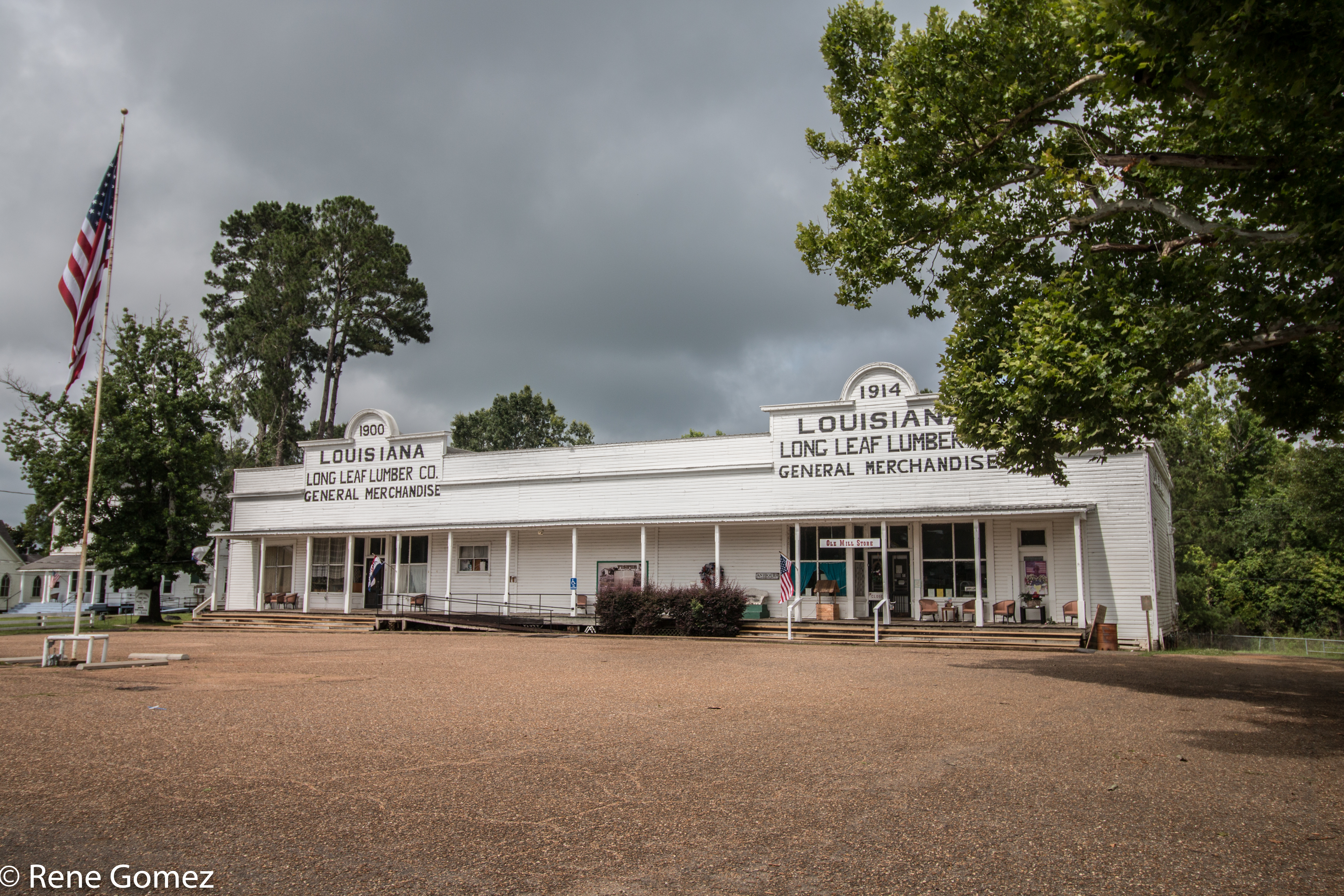
- Fisher Historic District

- Location of Fisher in Sabine Parish, Louisiana.

- Location of Louisiana in the United States
- Coordinates: 31°29′48″N 93°27′28″W
- Country: United States
- State: Louisiana
- Parish: Sabine

Area
  - Total: 0.62 sq mi (1.60 km^{2})
  - Land: 0.62 sq mi (1.60 km^{2})
  - Water: 0 sq mi (0.00 km^{2})
- Elevation: 367 ft (112 m)

Population (2020)
  - Total: 197
  - Density: 319.7/sq mi (123.42/km^{2})
- Time zone: UTC-6 (CST)
  - Summer (DST): UTC-5 (CDT)
- Area code: 318
- FIPS code: 22-25615
- GNIS feature ID: 2407453
- Website: www.toledobendlakecountry.com

Fisher is a village in Sabine Parish, Louisiana, United States. As of the 2020 census, Fisher had a population of 197.

== History ==
Fisher was named for Oliver Williams Fisher and built between 1899 and 1901 by the Louisiana Long Leaf Lumber Company. It remained a company town until the sawmill was sold to Boise Cascade Corporation in 1966. In 1979, the remaining company buildings were listed on the National Register of Historic Places as the Fisher Historic District.

== Geography ==
According to the United States Census Bureau, the village has a total area of 0.6 square miles (1.6 km^{2}), all land.

== Demographics ==
Historical population
Census	Pop.	Note	%±
1980	325		—
1990	277		−14.8%
2000	268		−3.2%
2010	230		−14.2%
2020	197		−14.3%
2025 (est.)	188	▼	−4.6%
U.S. Decennial Census

As of the census of 2000, there were 268 people, 101 households, and 72 families residing in the village. The population density was 446.8 inhabitants per square mile (172.5/km^{2}). There were 107 housing units at an average density of 178.4 per square mile (68.9/km^{2}). The racial makeup of the village was 65.67% White, 31.34% African American, 0.75% Native American, 1.87% from other races, and 0.37% from two or more races. Hispanic or Latino of any race were 2.24% of the population.

There were 101 households, out of which 35.6% had children under the age of 18 living with them, 58.4% were married couples living together, 9.9% had a female householder with no husband present, and 28.7% were non-families. 28.7% of all households were made up of individuals, and 7.9% had someone living alone who was 65 years of age or older. The average household size was 2.65 and the average family size was 3.29.

In the village, the population was spread out, with 30.2% under the age of 18, 8.6% from 18 to 24, 26.5% from 25 to 44, 25.7% from 45 to 64, and 9.0% who were 65 years of age or older. The median age was 36 years. For every 100 females, there were 116.1 males. For every 100 females age 18 and over, there were 98.9 males.

The median income for a household in the village was $27,708, and the median income for a family was $34,250. Males had a median income of $31,500 versus $11,875 for females. The per capita income for the village was $11,998. About 8.0% of families and 15.4% of the population were below the poverty line, including 16.4% of those under the age of eighteen and 10.5% of those 65 or over.

== Education ==
Public schools in Sabine Parish are operated by the Sabine Parish School Board. The village of Fisher is zoned to Many Elementary School (Grades PK-3), Many Junior High School (Grades 4–8), and Many High School (Grades 9–12).

== Culture ==
Fisher Sawmill Days was started in 1976 and is an annual festival, that takes place the third weekend in May, and captures a glimpse of turn-of-the-last-century lumbering in Louisiana.
