= Pleasant Hill, Sabine Parish, Louisiana =

Village in Louisiana, United States

Pleasant Hill, Louisiana
- Village
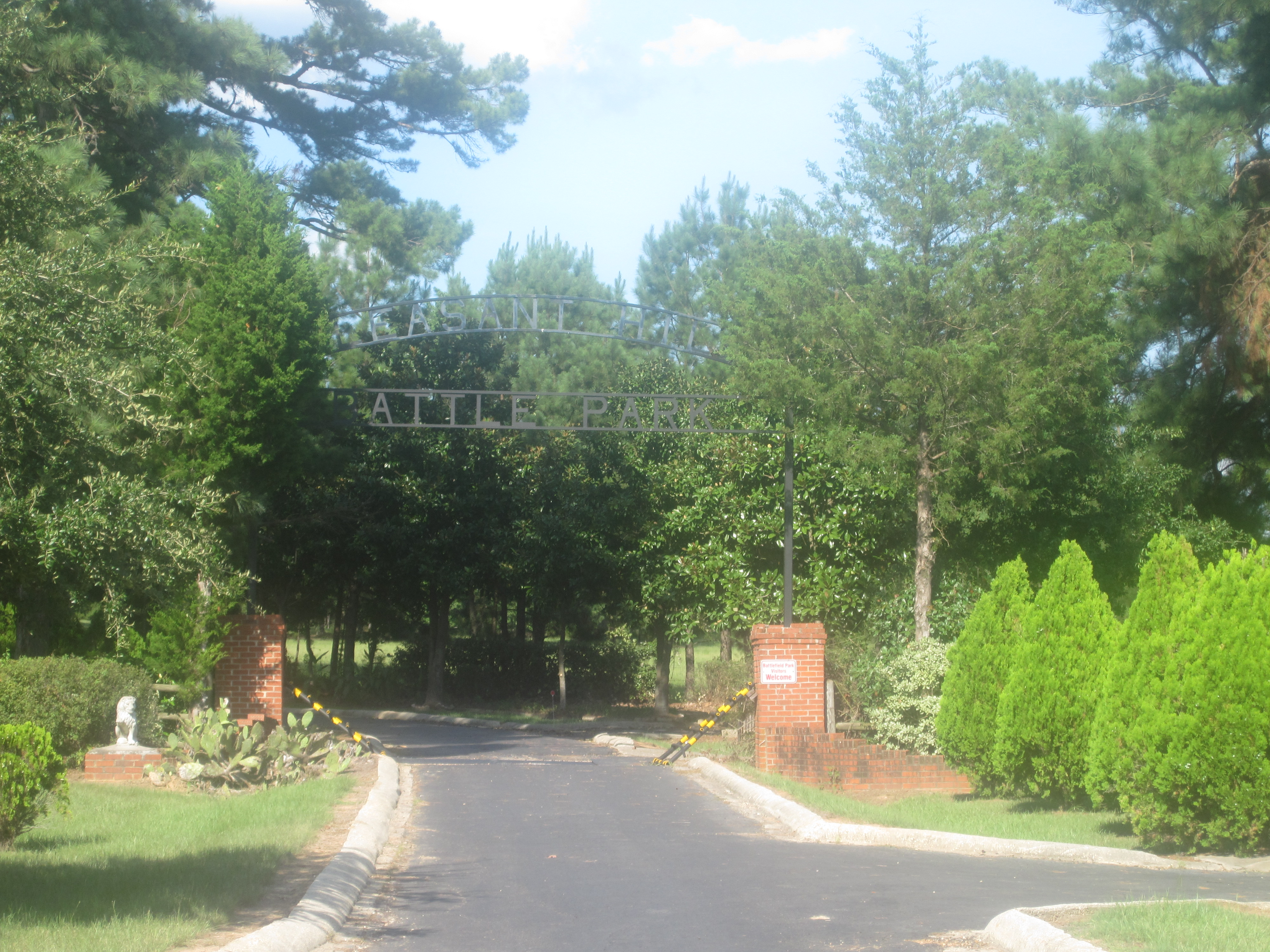
- Entrance to Pleasant Hill Battle Park
- Motto: "Come Enjoy the Experience"
- Location in Sabine Parish and Louisiana

- Location in the United States
- Coordinates: 31°48′55″N 93°30′59″W
- Country: United States
- State: Louisiana
- Parish: Sabine
- Founded: 1846
- Incorporated: 1896

Government
  - Type: Mayor–Council
  - Body: Board of Alderman

Area
  - Total: 1.61 sq mi (4.18 km^{2})
  - Land: 1.61 sq mi (4.18 km^{2})
  - Water: 0 sq mi (0.00 km^{2})
- Elevation: 295 ft (90 m)

Population (2020)
  - Total: 617
  - Density: 382.0/sq mi (147.48/km^{2})
- Time zone: UTC-6 (CST)
  - Summer (DST): UTC-5 (CDT)
- Postal code: 71065
- Area code: 318
- FIPS code: 22-61055
- GNIS feature ID: 2407527
- Highways: Highway 174; Highway 175

Pleasant Hill is a village in Sabine Parish in western Louisiana, United States. As of the 2010 census, the population of the village was 1,232. It is best known for the Battle of Pleasant Hill, a significant battle during the American Civil War on April 9, 1864.

== Geography ==
According to the United States Census Bureau, the village has a total area of 1.6 square miles (4.0 km^{2}), all land.

== Demographics ==
Historical population
Census	Pop.	Note	%±
1900	300		—
1910	442		47.3%
1920	554		25.3%
1930	807		45.7%
1940	737		−8.7%
1950	856		16.1%
1960	907		6.0%
1970	826		−8.9%
1980	776		−6.1%
1990	824		6.2%
2000	786		−4.6%
2010	723		−8.0%
2020	617		−14.7%
2025 (est.)	614	▼	−0.5%
U.S. Decennial Census

=== 2020 census ===
Pleasant Hill racial composition
Race	Number	Percentage
White (non-Hispanic)	306	49.59%
Black or African American (non-Hispanic)	274	44.41%
Native American	5	0.81%
Other/Mixed	21	3.4%
Hispanic or Latino	11	1.78%

As of the 2020 United States census, there were 617 people, 273 households, and 122 families residing in the village.

=== 2000 census ===
As of the 2000 census, there were 786 people, 293 households, and 200 families residing in the village. The population density was 505.4 inhabitants per square mile (195.1/km^{2}). There were 337 housing units at an average density of 216.7 per square mile (83.7/km^{2}). The racial makeup of the village was 58.78% White, 35.11% African American, 3.18% Native American, 0.13% Asian, and 2.80% from two or more races. Hispanic or Latino of any race were 1.91% of the population.

There were 293 households, out of which 37.5% had children under the age of 18 living with them, 44.4% were married couples living together, 18.8% had a female householder with no husband present, and 31.4% were non-families. 30.0% of all households were made up of individuals, and 14.0% had someone living alone who was 65 years of age or older. The average household size was 2.53 and the average family size was 3.17.

In the village, the population was spread out, with 29.9% under the age of 18, 8.3% from 18 to 24, 27.1% from 25 to 44, 18.4% from 45 to 64, and 16.3% who were 65 years of age or older. The median age was 35 years. For every 100 females, there were 84.1 males. For every 100 females age 18 and over, there were 76.6 males.

The median income for a household in the village was $18,068, and the median income for a family was $35,625. Males had a median income of $38,125 versus $17,500 for females. The per capita income for the village was $13,188. About 26.8% of families and 30.5% of the population were below the poverty line, including 29.5% of those under age 18 and 43.6% of those age 65 or over.

== Education ==
Public schools in Sabine Parish are operated by the Sabine Parish School Board. The village of Pleasant Hill is zoned to Pleasant Hill High School (Grades PK-12).

== Notable people ==
- Oscar K. Allen, governor of Louisiana from 1932 to 1936, taught school for a time at Pleasant Hill in the first decade of the 20th century.
- Edgar Hull, co-founder of both the Medical Center of Louisiana at New Orleans and Louisiana State University Health Sciences Center Shreveport, practiced medicine in Pleasant Hill from 1929 to 1931.
