= Fort Jesup =

- U.S. National Register of Historic Places
- U.S. National Historic Landmark
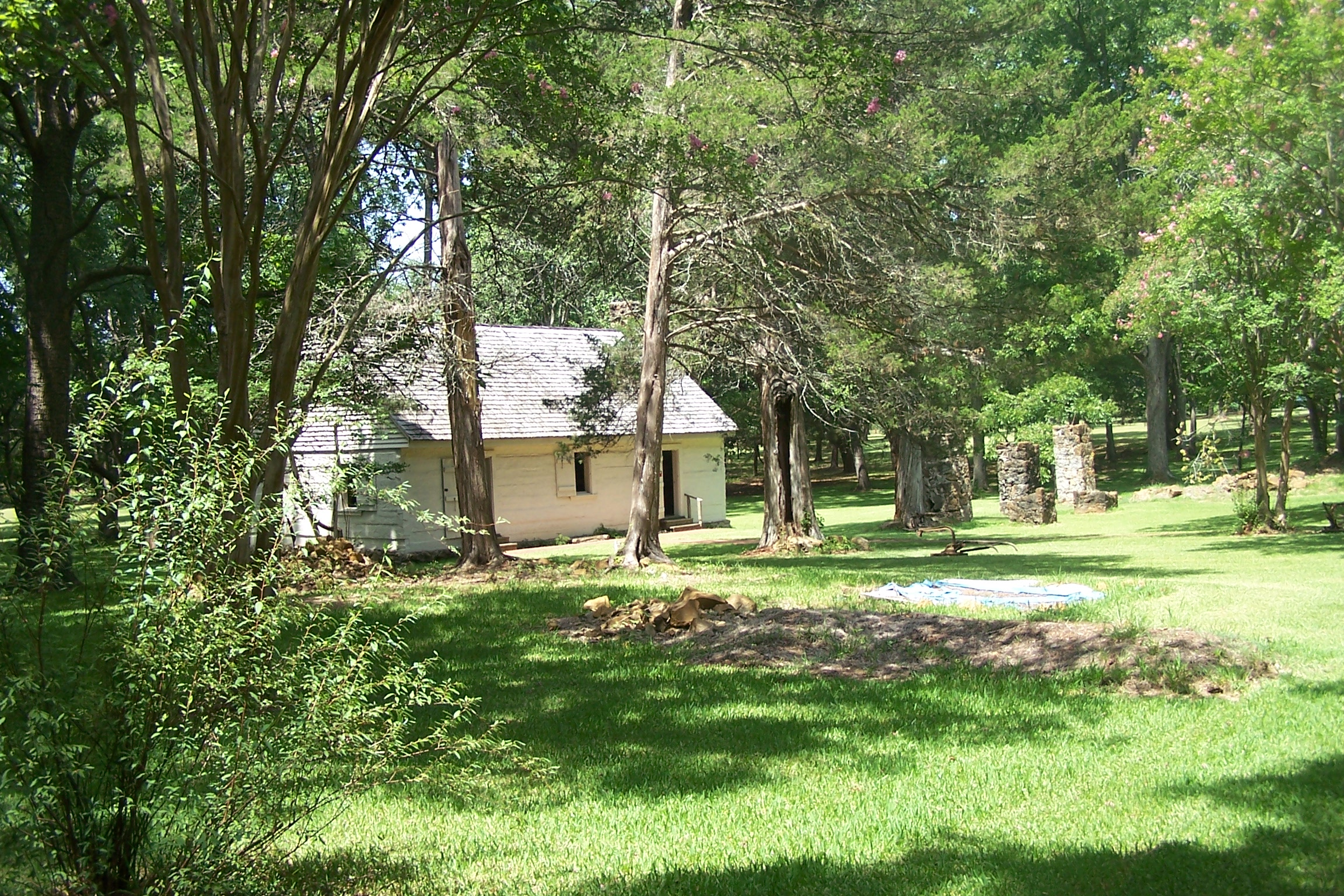
- An army kitchen on the grounds of Fort Jesup state historic site

- Location within Louisiana Location within the United States
- Location: Sabine Parish, Louisiana, United States
- Nearest city: Many, Louisiana
- Coordinates: 31°36′41″N 93°24′3″W
- Area: 21 acres (8.5 ha)
- Built: 1822
- NRHP reference No.: 66000381

Significant dates
- Added to NRHP: October 15, 1966
- Designated NHL: July 4, 1961

Fort Jesup, also known as Fort Jesup State Historic Site or Fort Jesup or Fort Jesup State Monument, was built in 1822, 22 miles (35 km) west of Natchitoches, Louisiana, to protect the United States border with New Spain and to return order to the Neutral Strip. Originally named Cantonment Jesup, the fort operated from 1822 until 1846. After the abandonment of the fort in 1846, the United States federal government continued to own the abandoned fort site until the privatization of the site in 1869.

== History ==
The Neutral Strip was created after the 1803 Louisiana Purchase, from which arose a disagreement about the location of the border between the American and Spanish territories. In order to avoid a war, the two countries agreed that the land in contention would remain neutral and free of armed forces from either side. This region stretched from Sabine River to Arroyo Hondo and encompassed the land that now makes up modern Sabine Parish, Louisiana. The Neutral Strip remained devoid of government and law enforcement until the Adams–Onís Treaty of 1819 finally set the border at the Sabine River.

=== Zachary Taylor ===
Colonel (later General) Zachary Taylor—future President of the United States—established Cantonment Jesup in 1822 after Fort Seldon, a temporary headquarters for General Edmund Pendleton Gaines, was too far from the conflict zone of the Sabine River. Taylor quickly subdued the former Neutral Strip, gaining experience and popularity. The surgeon at the cantonment recorded meteorological observations. His forces, known as the Army of Observation, remained in the fort and monitored the Texas territory as it passed from Spanish to Mexican control, and finally broke away as an independent republic. In 1845, General Taylor commanded the US Army of Observation's excursion into Texas and ignited the Mexican–American War. He would eventually gain popularity from his victories that would propel his political career to the Presidency of the United States of America.

=== Closure ===
The United States won the war and gained control of Texas, rendering Fort Jesup unnecessary. Officially evacuated in 1846, the fort thereafter deteriorated. The federal government privatized it in 1869.

=== State Park ===
By the 1930s, the only remaining building at Fort Jesup was the kitchen of Enlisted Barracks 4. Residents of the nearby town of Many, Louisiana raised money to restore the building and turned the area into a park.

The site was acquired by the Louisiana Office of State Parks in 1956, and in 1961, the fort was designated a National Historic Landmark.

Since then, the kitchen has been restored and decorated with historically accurate furniture. An officer's quarters building has been reconstructed, and now serves as a museum.

The fort site is located on Louisiana Highway 6, seven miles (11 km) northeast of Many.

== Demographics ==
Fort Jesup first appeared as a census designated place in the 2010 U.S. census.

== See also ==
- Fort Scott National Historic Site
- List of National Historic Landmarks in Louisiana
- National Register of Historic Places listings in Sabine Parish, Louisiana
- List of Louisiana state historic sites
