= Zwolle, Louisiana =

Town in Louisiana, United States

Zwolle
- Town
- Town of Zwolle
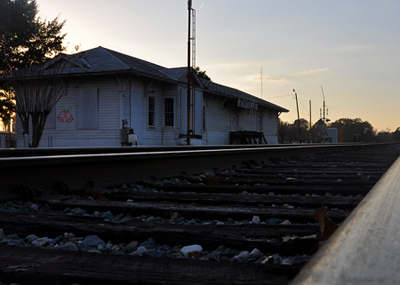
- Old Zwolle Train Station on Main Street

- Location of Zwolle in Sabine Parish, Louisiana.

- Location within Louisiana Location within the United States
- Coordinates: 31°38′20″N 93°38′22″W
- Country: United States
- State: Louisiana
- Parish: Sabine

Area
  - Total: 4.98 sq mi (12.90 km^{2})
  - Land: 4.56 sq mi (11.82 km^{2})
  - Water: 0.42 sq mi (1.09 km^{2})
- Elevation: 240 ft (73 m)

Population (2020)
  - Total: 1,638
  - Density: 359.1/sq mi (138.63/km^{2})
- Time zone: UTC-6 (CST)
  - Summer (DST): UTC-5 (CDT)
- Zip Code: 71486
- Area Code: 318
- FIPS code: 22-83685
- GNIS feature ID: 2406931

Zwolle (/zəˈwɒli/ zə-WOL-ee) is a small town in Sabine Parish, Louisiana, United States. As of the 2020 census, Zwolle had a population of 1,638. Established in 1896 along the Kansas City Southern Railway, its name is attributed to Dutch financier, Jan De Goeijen, who named the settlement to honor his place of birth, Zwolle, Netherlands

== History ==
The first inhabitants of the bowl-shaped area of land upon which the town of Zwolle is situated were the Mound Builders. Lured here for protection from storms, the "bowl" offered them protection. Prehistoric people built the dome-shaped mounds that line the banks of Bayou Scie and Bayou San Miguel, which form a hollow circle around the townsite. As Mound Builders, they were ancestors of North American Indians who inhabited the territory when the Europeans arrived.

Later, the area was colonized by Spain, which sent the earliest non-Indians to the territory. Las Cabezas, a Spanish mission church was built at Bayou Scie. Spanish soldiers and Native people intermarried over many generations, and Spanish was still spoken in the area until the 1970s. The town was originally called Vallecillo, which became the source of the name Bayou Scie.

The first English-speaking settlers arrived in Sabine Parish in 1824, via Natchitoches. These pioneers came chiefly from Mississippi, Alabama, Georgia, and the Carolinas. In 1871, many more of these settlers moved in and acquired land under the homestead act.

Arthur Stilwell built the Kansas City Southern Railroad (KCS) from Kansas City to Port Arthur, Texas. He had reached Van Buren, Arkansas, in 1893 when he ran out of funds. Stilwell went to Zwolle, the Netherlands, and met with a rich coffee merchant Jan De Goeijen. About 1896, Stilwell and De Goeijen were plotting a route to extend the KCS railway to the Gulf of Mexico. While visiting the area destined to become Zwolle, De Goeijen was impressed with St. Joseph Catholic Church. St. Joseph Catholic Church, established 1881, was a product of the early Spanish missions. De Goeijen sold a $3,000,000 stock issue for Stilwell's railroad and he was permitted to name the place after his hometown and birthplace of Zwolle, a riverside city of currently over 130,000 population in the Netherlands.

On July 14, 1896, Teofilo “T.” Laroux, a community leader and descendant of the early families, donated 20 acres to the KCS for a railroad depot and town to be built. Paul M. Potts, a prominent cotton farmer donated an additional 22.05 acres on October 15, 1896. The Zwolle townsite was developed by the Arkansas Townsite Company and the official town charter was granted June 12, 1898. The original Kansas City Southern Depot, Zwolle opened October 26, 1896, and served until the present depot was reconstructed in about 1914 by the KCS.

The advent of the railroad brought new prosperity to the town and altered its destiny. Zwolle's strategic location made it possible for the small town to flourish as a transportation center for lumber, oil and cotton production. Though no longer a functioning railroad depot, it remains significant to the history and posterity of the town. On December 23, 1970, the depot was donated to the town of Zwolle by the KCS. The depot was placed on the National Register of Historic Places by the United States Department of the Interior on August 7, 1989.

== Geography ==
According to the United States Census Bureau, the town has a total area of 3.7 square miles (9.5 km^{2}), of which 3.2 square miles (8.4 km^{2}) is land and 0.4 square mile (1.1 km^{2}) (11.99%) is water.

== Demographics ==
Historical population
Census	Pop.	Note	%±
1900	276		—
1910	973		252.5%
1920	909		−6.6%
1930	1,264		39.1%
1940	1,500		18.7%
1950	1,555		3.7%
1960	1,326		−14.7%
1970	2,169		63.6%
1980	2,602		20.0%
1990	1,779		−31.6%
2000	1,783		0.2%
2010	1,759		−1.3%
2020	1,638		−6.9%
2025 (est.)	1,605	▼	−2.0%
U.S. Decennial Census

=== 2020 census ===
Zwolle racial composition
Race	Number	Percentage
White (non-Hispanic)	494	30.16%
Black or African American (non-Hispanic)	721	44.02%
Native American	215	13.13%
Asian	5	0.31%
Pacific Islander	2	0.12%
Other/Mixed	111	6.78%
Hispanic or Latino	90	5.49%

As of the 2020 census, Zwolle had a population of 1,638. The median age was 36.6 years. 28.4% of residents were under the age of 18 and 14.7% of residents were 65 years of age or older. For every 100 females there were 89.4 males, and for every 100 females age 18 and over there were 84.9 males age 18 and over.

0.0% of residents lived in urban areas, while 100.0% lived in rural areas.

There were 670 households in Zwolle, of which 37.5% had children under the age of 18 living in them. There were 415 families residing in the town. Of all households, 30.1% were married-couple households, 20.6% were households with a male householder and no spouse or partner present, and 41.3% were households with a female householder and no spouse or partner present. About 32.3% of all households were made up of individuals and 11.5% had someone living alone who was 65 years of age or older.

There were 813 housing units, of which 17.6% were vacant. The homeowner vacancy rate was 0.0% and the rental vacancy rate was 12.9%.

=== 2010 census ===
As of the 2010 United States census, there were 1,759 people living in the town. The racial makeup of the town was 48.7% Black, 28.1% White, 14.1% Native American, 0.1% Asian and 3.5% from two or more races. 5.5% were Hispanic or Latino of any race.

=== 2000 census ===
As of the census of 2000, there were 1,783 people, 630 households, and 437 families living in the town. The population density was 552.6 inhabitants per square mile (213.4/km^{2}). There were 725 housing units at an average density of 224.7 per square mile (86.8/km^{2}). The racial makeup of the town was 6.37% White, 47.17% African American, 16.38% Native American, 1.07% from other races, and 2.02% from two or more races. Hispanic or Latino of any race were 33.17% of the population.

There were 630 households, out of which 39.4% had children under the age of 18 living with them, 36.8% were married couples living together, 27.9% had a female householder with no husband present, and 30.5% were non-families. 27.5% of all households were made up of individuals, and 12.9% had someone living alone who was 65 years of age or older. The average household size was 2.73 and the average family size was 3.36.

In the town, the population was spread out, with 35.5% under the age of 18, 9.0% from 18 to 24, 23.8% from 25 to 44, 17.0% from 45 to 64, and 14.6% who were 65 years of age or older. The median age was 30 years. For every 100 females, there were 82.3 males. For every 100 females age 18 and over, there were 75.3 males.

The median income for a household in the town was $15,843, and the median income for a family was $17,326. Males had a median income of $25,625 versus $14,922 for females. The per capita income for the town was $9,042. About 37.7% of families and 40.5% of the population were below the poverty line, including 52.8% of those under age 18 and 35.9% of those age 65 or over.

== Education ==
It is in the Sabine Parish School District.

Zwolle High School, Intermediate, and Zwolle Elementary School are combined into one building. The school has 1,500 students.

== Culture ==
=== Zwolle Tamale Fiesta ===
The Zwolle Tamale Fiesta is the town's signature festival. The festival was founded in 1975 at the suggestion of Sabine Parish Tourist Commission member and Zwolle native Rogers P. Loupe. The fiesta celebrates the Native American and Spanish heritage and cultural influence rooted in the town's origins. The fiesta takes its name from the tamale and alludes to the town's local notoriety for what is arguably a spicier version of the Mississippi Delta-style boiled tamale, which is believed to have been made in the area since the early 1700s.

The festival is traditionally held on the 2nd weekend of October, kicking off on Thursday night and concluding on Sunday. Originally, the Zwolle High School campus hosted the festival. In the early 2000s, the town completed construction of the Zwolle Festival Grounds, after which The Fiesta relocated to the grounds and scaled back to conclude on Saturday night. Attractions include live music, cultural exhibitions, a parade, a ball, a small-scale carnival, a car show and a mud bog competition.

=== Loggers and Forestry Festival ===
Founded in 1995, the Loggers and Forestry Festival pays tribute to workers in the community's horticulture industry – the cornerstone of the local economy. Each year, A festival queen is decided by a pageant, and the oldest-living logger residing in the town is named the king.

The Loggers and Forestry festival is held at the Zwolle Festival Grounds and mirrors the Tamale Fiesta, including several of its signature events like the parade and mud bog. The festival is held between late April and early May. It is the town's second-largest local event.

== Notable people ==
- Former Lieutenant Governor William J. "Bill" Dodd (1909–1991) graduated from Zwolle High School.
- Michael Cutright of the 1989 Denver Nuggets, played basketball at Zwolle High School and still resides in the area.

== See also ==
- KTEZ
- Choctaw-Apache Tribe
