= Mansfield station (Louisiana) =

- Kansas City Southern Depot
- Formerly listed on the U.S. National Register of Historic Places
- Location within Louisiana Location within the United States
- Location: Mansfield, Louisiana
- Coordinates: 32°2′12″N 93°42′1″W
- Built: 1927
- NRHP reference No.: 88003198

Significant dates
- Added to NRHP: January 19, 1989
- Removed from NRHP: January 31, 2019

The Kansas City Southern Depot was a railway station in Mansfield, Louisiana.

Kansas City Southern Railway had laid tracks through the area in 1896 and established a station at Mansfield. A new station building was constructed in 1927, replacing an older structure on the site. A local KCS train served the town into the 1960s.

After passenger and freight service ended, KCS gifted the station to the city under the provision that it be used for some civic purpose. It was transferred to the DeSoto Parish Council for the Aging in 1978.

The 1927-built station was added to the National Register of Historic Places on January 19, 1989. It was delisted on January 31, 2019, after it was demolished.

Preceding station	Kansas City Southern Railway	Following station
Kingston toward Kansas City	Main Line	Trenton toward Port Arthur
