= Ronald G. Tompkins =

American physician and academic (1951–2022)

- Born: 1951; Many, Louisiana, U.S.
- Died: January 17, 2022 (aged 70)
- Education: Tulane University (BA, MD); Massachusetts Institute of Technology
- Occupations: Physician; academic
- Parent(s): Horace Tompkins; Ruby Elizabeth Tompkins

Ronald G. Tompkins (1951 – January 17, 2022) was an American physician and academic. He served as Sumner M. Redstone Professor of Surgery at Harvard Medical School and chief of Surgery, Science and Bioengineering at Massachusetts General Hospital’s (MGH) Division of Surgery. He was also the founding director of The Institute for Bioengineering and Biotechnology (MGH surgery division) and of the Center for Engineering in Medicine & Surgery at MGH.

== Early life and education ==
Tompkins was born in Many, Louisiana to Horace and Ruby Elizabeth Tompkins, a teacher. He became an Eagle Scout in 1966. He earned his B.A. in chemistry in 1972, before completing an M.D. at Tulane University. He went on to earn a master's degree and doctorate in chemical engineering in 1983, from the Massachusetts Institute of Technology.

== Career ==
Tompkins completed his surgery residency at Harvard University and joined the surgical faculty at MGH in 1987. In 1990 he became Chief of Staff at Shriners Hospitals for Children in Boston. He served in that role and as Chief of Trauma and Burn Services at MGH for 22 years.

He served as the Chief Medical Officer at the Open Medicine Foundation (OMF) and was co-director of the Myalgic Encephalomyelitis/Chronic Fatigue Syndrome (ME/CFS) Collaboration at the Harvard-Affiliated Hospitals sponsored by OMF.

== Death ==
Tompkins died unexpectedly on January 17, 2022, aged 70.
