= Florien, Louisiana =

- Village
- Village of Florien
- Location of Florien in Sabine Parish, Louisiana.

- Location of Louisiana in the United States
- Coordinates: 31°26′53″N 93°27′30″W
- Country: United States
- State: Louisiana
- Parish: Sabine

Area
  - Total: 2.23 sq mi (5.78 km^{2})
  - Land: 2.23 sq mi (5.78 km^{2})
  - Water: 0 sq mi (0.00 km^{2})
- Elevation: 249 ft (76 m)

Population (2020)
  - Total: 553
  - Density: 247.7/sq mi (95.62/km^{2})
- Time zone: UTC-6 (CST)
  - Summer (DST): UTC-5 (CDT)
- Area code: 318
- FIPS code: 22-25860
- GNIS feature ID: 2407455
- Website: villageofflorien.com

Florien is a village in Sabine Parish, Louisiana, United States. As of the 2020 census, Florien had a population of 553. The village is home to the annual Sabine Free State Festival, celebrating the village's history as part of the Sabine Neutral Strip.

== Geography ==
According to the United States Census Bureau, the village has a total area of 2.2 square miles (5.7 km^{2}), all land.

=== Climate ===
This climatic region is typified by large seasonal temperature differences, with warm to hot (and often humid) summers and cold (sometimes severely cold) winters. According to the Köppen Climate Classification system, Florien has a humid subtropical climate, abbreviated "Cfa" on climate maps.

== Demographics ==
Historical population
Census	Pop.	Note	%±
1960	496		—
1970	639		28.8%
1980	964		50.9%
1990	626		−35.1%
2000	692		10.5%
2010	633		−8.5%
2020	553		−12.6%
2025 (est.)	538	▼	−2.7%
U.S. Decennial Census

As of the census of 2000, there were 692 people, 258 households, and 190 families residing in the village. The population density was 311.5 inhabitants per square mile (120.3/km^{2}). There were 312 housing units at an average density of 140.4 per square mile (54.2/km^{2}). The racial makeup of the village was 71.24% White, 27.02% African American, 0.87% Native American, 0.14% from other races, and 0.72% from two or more races. Hispanic or Latino of any race were 2.02% of the population.

There were 258 households, out of which 41.9% had children under the age of 18 living with them, 55.4% were married couples living together, 15.5% had a female householder with no husband present, and 26.0% were non-families. 24.4% of all households were made up of individuals, and 10.9% had someone living alone who was 65 years of age or older. The average household size was 2.68 and the average family size was 3.19.

In the village, the population was spread out, with 30.8% under the age of 18, 8.5% from 18 to 24, 29.2% from 25 to 44, 20.8% from 45 to 64, and 10.7% who were 65 years of age or older. The median age was 33 years. For every 100 females, there were 85.0 males. For every 100 females age 18 and over, there were 84.9 males.

The median income for a household in the village was $22,153, and the median income for a family was $25,833. Males had a median income of $29,375 versus $16,354 for females. The per capita income for the village was $10,855. About 21.4% of families and 24.8% of the population were below the poverty line, including 34.1% of those under age 18 and 7.9% of those age 65 or over.

== Education ==
Public schools in Sabine Parish are operated by the Sabine Parish School Board. The village of Florien is zoned to Florien High School (Grades PK-12). The school has an enrollment of 582. The mascot is the Black Cat with school colors of black and yellow.
