= Sabine Parish School Board =

Public school system in Louisiana, U.S.

Address
- 695 Peterson Street; PO Box 1079 Many, Sabine Parish, Louisiana, 71449; United States
- Coordinates: 31.5694°N 93.4845°W

District information
- Type: Public
- Superintendent: Sara Ebarb

Other information
- Website: website

The Sabine Parish School Board is an entity responsible for the operation of public schools in Sabine Parish, Louisiana, United States. It is headquartered in the town of Many.

== History ==
In January 2014, the ACLU filed suit against the Sabine Parish School Board, Superintendent Sara Ebarb, Principal Gene Wright and teacher Rita Roark of Negreet High School, alleging officials at one of its schools harassed a sixth-grader because of his Buddhist faith and that the district routinely pushes Christian beliefs upon their students.

Andrew Cohen of The Atlantic stated that if the accusations are true, the district would have no legal defense. He added that the school and district administration would be "converting a public school into a Christian school in flagrant violation of the law."

In March 2014, the U.S. District Court approved a consent decree, a court order agreed to by both parties, requiring the Sabine Parish School Board to end to a variety of alleged unconstitutional practices at Negreet High School and other Sabine Parish Schools. The consent decree declared; [t]he District and School Board are permanently enjoined from permitting School Officials at any school within the School District to promote their personal religious beliefs to students in class or during or in conjunction with a School Event." Furthermore, "School Officials shall not denigrate any particular faith, or lack thereof, or single out any student for disfavor or criticism because of his or her particular faith or religious belief, or lack thereof."

== Schools ==
- Grades 9-12
  - Many High School (Unincorporated area)
- Grades 7-12
  - Zwolle High School (Zwolle)
- Grades 4-8
  - Many Junior High School (Unincorporated area)
- Grades PK-3
  - Many Elementary School (Many)
- Grades PK-6
  - Zwolle Elementary School (Zwolle)
- Grades PK-12
  - Converse High School (Converse)
  - Ebarb School (Unincorporated area)
  - Florien High School (Florien)
  - Pleasant Hill High School (Pleasant Hill)
  - Negreet High School (Unincorporated area)
- Other Campuses
  - Sabine Parish Family Literacy Center (Pre-Kindergarten; Many)
  - Sabine Program for At Risk Kids "SPARK" (Grades 5-12; Many)

== Demographics ==
- Total Students (as of October 1, 2007): 4,222
- Gender
  - Male: 53%
  - Female: 47%
- Race/Ethnicity
  - White: 51.37%
  - African American: 24.09%
  - Native American: 21.77%
  - Hispanic: 2.63%
  - Asian: 0.14%
- Socio-Economic Indicators
  - At-Risk: 66.60%
  - Free Lunch: 57.20%
  - Reduced Lunch: 9.40%

== Notable people ==
- John Pickett, Jr., state representative 1968 to 1972, 11th Judicial District Court judge 1972 to 1990, school board member of Sabine Parish School Board 1960 to 1968

== See also ==
- List of school districts in Louisiana
