= Sabine Parish, Louisiana =

Parish in the United States

Coordinates: 31.56°N 93.56°W

- Parish
- Parish of Sabine; Paroisse de la Sabine (French)
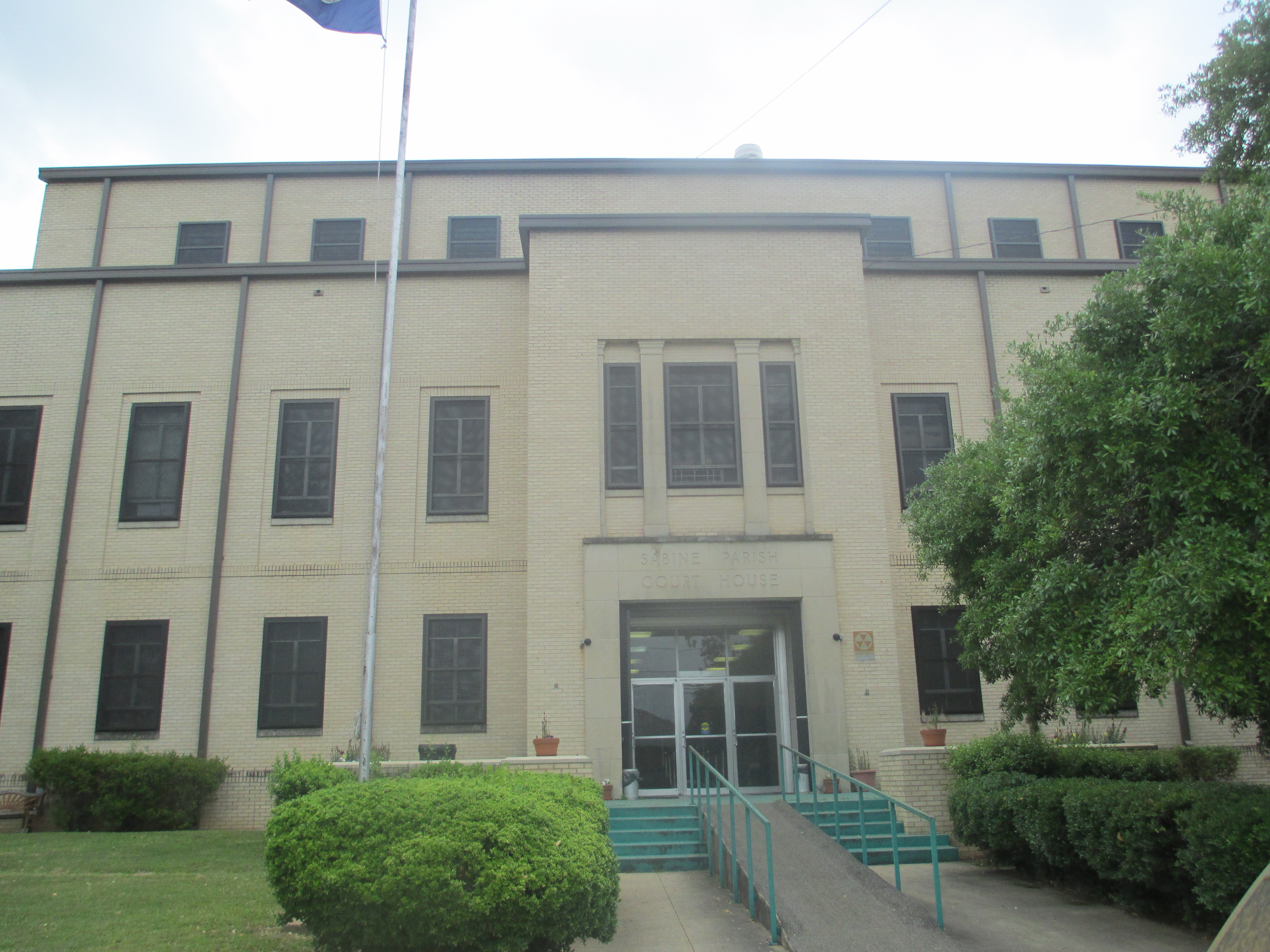
- Sabine Parish Courthouse in Many

- Location within the U.S. state of Louisiana

- Louisiana's location within the U.S.
- Country: United States
- State: Louisiana
- Region: Central Louisiana
- Founded: March 27, 1843; 183 years ago
- Named for: Sabine River and Sabine Free State
- Parish seat (and largest town): Many
- Incorporated municipalities: 7 (total): 2 towns and 5 villages; (located entirely or partially within parish boundaries)

Area
  - Total: 1,012 sq mi (2,620 km^{2})
  - Land: 867 sq mi (2,250 km^{2})
  - Water: 145 sq mi (380 km^{2})
  - percentage: 14 sq mi (36 km^{2})

Population (2020)
  - Total: 22,155
  - Estimate (2025): 21,834 ▼
  - Density: 25.6/sq mi (9.87/km^{2})
- Time zone: UTC-6 (CST)
  - Summer (DST): UTC-5 (CDT)
- Area code: 318
- Congressional district: 4th
- Website: Sabine Parish Police Jury

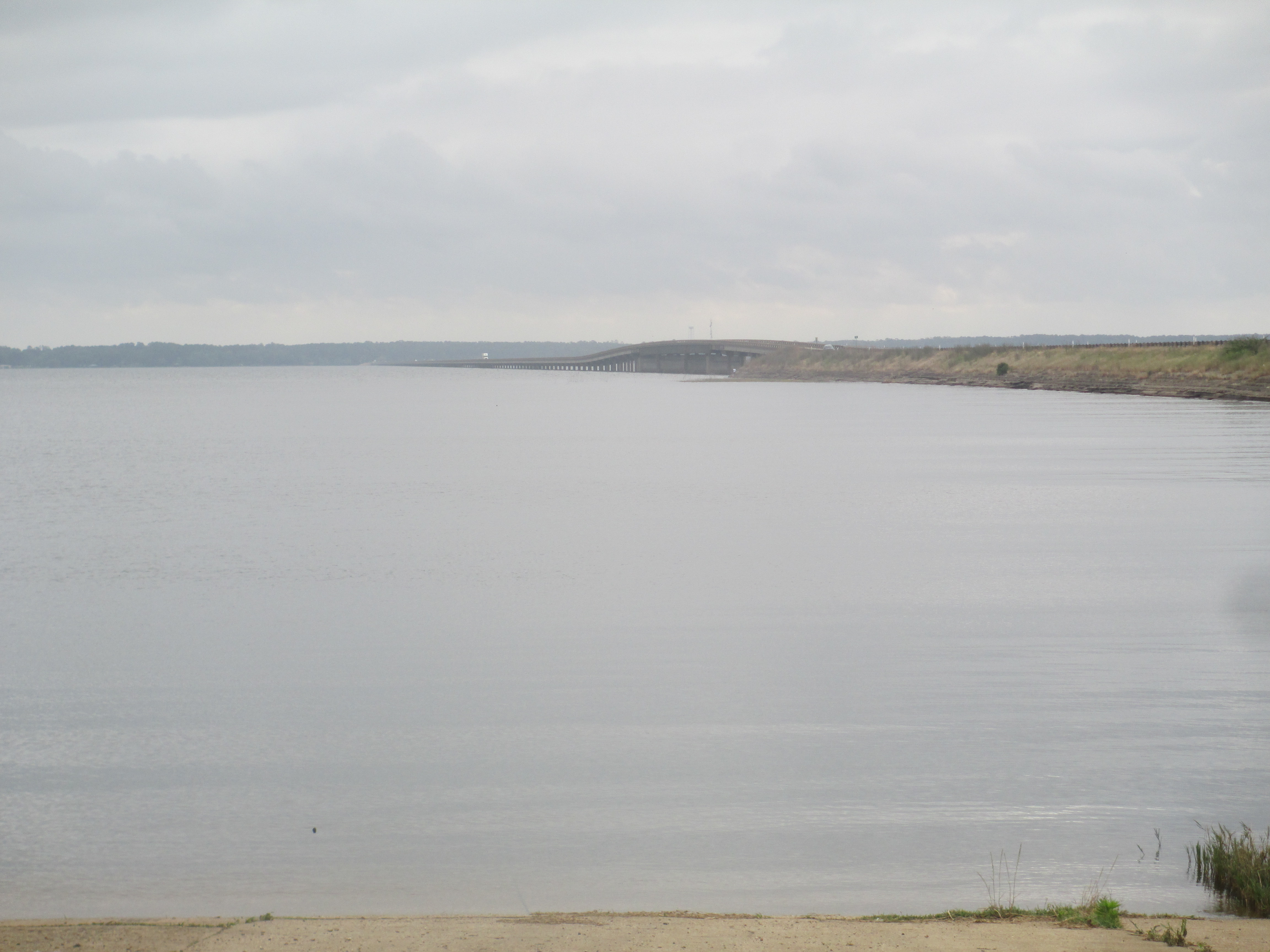
In background, the bridge linking Louisiana and Texas over the Toledo Bend Reservoir of the Sabine River west of Many

Sabine Parish (French: Paroisse de la Sabine) is a parish located in the U.S. state of Louisiana. As of the 2020 census, the population was 22,155. The parish seat and largest town is Many.

Sabine was one of five parishes created in as many weeks by the Louisiana State Legislature on March 27, 1843. It was created from Natchitoches Parish with the Sabine River as the international boundary between the United States and the Republic of Texas as the western boundary.

== History ==
=== The neutral strip ===
The area, inhabited first by the Adais (Brushwood) Indians of the Caddo Confederacy, was first under Spanish rule, then French, English, Spanish again, and French when Napoleon sold it to the United States in the Louisiana Purchase of 1803.

Boundary disputes followed the purchase. The United States claimed the Sabine River as the border and Spain claimed a line farther east in Louisiana along Arroyo Hondo, a tributary of the Red River. The Neutral Ground Treaty was affected in 1806, declaring the area "Sabine Free State," a demilitarized zone, which became the neutral strip for outlaws, desperadoes, criminals and filibusters. The strip extended, roughly, from Sabine River east to the Calcasieu River, Bayous Kisatchie and Don Manuel, Lac Terre Noir and the Arroyo Hondo. Both nations claimed ownership but neither exercised control. English speaking settlers from the older eastern states began moving into the section during the westward expansion years before the boundary was established. They settled on Spanish grants known as Rio Hondo claims. One of the earliest settlers was Thomas Arthur, who filed a claim for 640 acres (2.6 km^{2}) on Negreet Creek.

In 1819, Spain abandoned all claims to land east of the Sabine River and the United States moved in to establish law and order. Great caravans of home seekers marched over the old highways and many of them settled in present-day Sabine Parish. In the years that followed, small settlements began to make their appearances throughout the parish. Possibly the earliest of these was Negreet, founded in 1822, in the southern part of the parish where Christopher Anthony located on Bayou Negreet. Other settlements were Toro, in the extreme south, 1827, and Noble, in the north portion, dating back to the 1830s. Fort Jesup was founded in 1822 by Lieutenant Colonel Zachary Taylor who later became the 12th President of the United States. Taylor's troops managed to establish law and order in this Neutral Ground. Fort Jesup has served as a vital part of Sabine Parish over the years and can be enjoyed by visitors today. It was an important frontier post until the annexation of Texas in 1845 and the focal point of the American expansionist movement.

The two main highways of the southwest traversed the Neutral Strip and ran about four miles (6.4 km) apart in the vicinity of Many. The San Antonio Trace and El Camino Real extended from Natchitoches Parish westward directly across Sabine Parish into East Texas. Since El Camino Real was older and better known, a number of farmers and villages settled along it. Philip Nolan's Trace crossed the Red River above Alexandria and ran through the Kisatchie country to join El Camino Real near the Sabine River crossing.

=== Establishment of Sabine Parish ===
The parish was created at a time when America had entered upon a new era of progress. A government survey in 1831 laid out the Sabine area in townships and sections and this, together with the clearing of the Red River "raft" by Henry Miller Shreve, in 1838, opened the Red River to steamboat traffic and gave impetus to the colonization of the area. Steamboats began running on the Sabine River in 1830, and by 1850 heavy traffic was carried on the Sabine. Popular landing points were Columbus, East Pendleton and Carter's Ferry. About three miles (4.8 km) south of Pendleton was the large and flourishing river port of Sabine Town. The influx of settlers reached its zenith just prior to the American Civil War.

Sabine Parish was one of the five parishes created in as many weeks by the state legislature in 1843 during the administration of Governor Alexander Mouton. The parish was created from Natchitoches Parish on March 7, 1843. Since Texas was an independent republic, the Sabine River constituted an international border.

Less than one month later the parish was given several additional townships when legislators defined lines of its northern neighbor, DeSoto Parish. One half township from Natchitoches, originally intended to be part of Sabine was added in 1854. In 1871, a considerable portion of the southern half of Sabine Parish was removed with the establishment of Vernon Parish. Since then the parish boundaries have remained unchanged.

Act 46 creating the parish specified that the seat of government should be named Many in honor of Col. John B. Many, commandant at Fort Jesup, then the most important settlement in the parish. Many was on the Natchitoches San Antonio Road, or El Camino Real, which carried traffic into Texas.

On May 17, 1843, Judge W. R. D. Speight, who was parish judge, I. W. Eason, Samuel S. Eason and G. W. Thompson purchased and gave to Sabine Parish 40 acres (160,000 m^{2}) of land. Immediately some thirty citizens petitioned the police jury to lay out the town on the land, sell lots and make arrangements for the erection of public buildings. The police jury planned a courthouse and jail, raising the construction money with the sale of the lots.

The first house was erected by John Baldwin, who operated a store and used his home as a tavern. He was also the first postmaster of Many. The first settler was Williams Mains, who came to the area in 1830. The first cotton gin was built in the early 1850s, and the first census showed Sabine had a population of 3,347 whites and 1,168 slaves.

=== Battle of Pleasant Hill ===
Sabine Parish was the scene of the last major engagement in Louisiana, which was fought April 9, 1864, at old Pleasant Hill and along the Sabine-DeSoto Parish line. The battle took place the following day after the Confederate victory at Mansfield. The action forced the withdrawal of Federal troops along the Shreveport-Natchitoches road, which cut across the northeast section of the parish.

These clashes were regarded as vitally important. Although they did not affect the ultimate outcome of the war, they frustrated the attempt by Union forces to capture Shreveport and split Texas from the rest of the Confederacy.

=== Railroads ===
Following the war the steamboat gave way to the railroad. The Texas-Pacific was completed in 1882 between Shreveport and New Orleans realizing how important a railroad was to a town, Pleasant Hill moved itself out of DeSoto Parish to the railroad which was two miles (3.2 km) away in Sabine Parish. The construction of the Kansas City Southern Railroad through the parish in 1896 led to the founding of the towns of Converse, Zwolle, Fisher and Florien.

The area was mainly agriculture until the railroads brought lumbermen, who set up sawmills to convert the trees that blanketed the state into lumber to satisfy a worldwide demand for longleaf virgin pine. Three decades later the forest acres were barren and a great many sawmills, including Gandy and Peason moved out. Reforestation was innovated in the early 1940s and pulp and paper mills bought the thinnings. The payoff was the development of Southern Pine plywood and the opening of Vancouver Plywood, Inc., the first plywood mill in the state, in Florien.

Reforestation lagniappe was the creation of Hodges Gardens in the 1950s, which opened a brand new industry. That was tourism, which was augmented with the completion of Toledo Bend Reservoir in 1968.

=== WWII and Louisiana Maneuvers ===
The largest military maneuvers ever held in the United States were staged in and around Sabine Parish in May 1940. These army maneuvers in the Sabine River area brought the possibility of war very close as 40,000 officers and men of the Blue Army defended the Sabine River from 30,000 invading Red troops. Soldiers from thirty-three states took part in the games, which covered 10,000 square miles (26,000 km^{2}) of cut over pinelands, hills, rivers, and valleys between Alexandria and Nacogdoches, Texas.

Commanders and their staffs passing through the area comprised a virtual "who's who" in the military. These included Lieutenant General Ben Lear, Colonel Dwight D. Eisenhower, Lieutenant General Walter Krueger, Brigadier General George S. Patton, Jr., and Major J. L. Benedict.

Following the discovery of oil in 1928, crude oil and natural gas joined timber as leading natural resources until about 1934 when oil experienced a natural decline. Oil was not a major economic factor again until new reserves were brought in near Many in the 1950s. Its 1,008 square miles (2,610 km^{2}) contains some of the finest timber in the world. In addition, Sabine Parish is rich in other natural resources.

=== Recent events ===
In January 2014, the ACLU filed suit against the Sabine Parish School Board, Superintendent Sara Ebarb, Principal Gene Wright and teacher Rita Roark of Negreet High School, alleging officials at one of its schools harassed a sixth-grader because of his Buddhist faith and that the district routinely pushes Christian beliefs upon their students. The court swiftly ruled against the school board.

== Geography ==
According to the U.S. Census Bureau, the parish has a total area of 1,012 square miles (2,620 km^{2}), of which 867 square miles (2,250 km^{2}) is land and 145 square miles (380 km^{2}) (14%) is water.

=== Major highways ===
- U.S. Highway 171
  - US 171 Bus.
- Louisiana Highway 6
- Louisiana Highway 118
- Louisiana Highway 120
- Louisiana Highway 174
- Louisiana Highway 175
- Louisiana Highway 191
- Louisiana Highway 392
- Louisiana Highway 473
- Louisiana Highway 474
- Louisiana Highway 475
- Louisiana Highway 476
- Louisiana Highway 481
- Louisiana Highway 482
- Louisiana Highway 483
- Louisiana Highway 1215
- Louisiana Highway 1216
- Louisiana Highway 1217
- Louisiana Highway 1218
- Louisiana Highway 3118
- Louisiana Highway 3229

=== Adjacent parishes and counties ===
- De Soto Parish (north)
- Natchitoches Parish (east)
- Vernon Parish (southeast)
- Newton County, Texas (southwest)
- Sabine County, Texas (west)
- Shelby County, Texas (northwest)

== Demographics ==
Historical population
Census	Pop.	Note	%±
1850	4,515		—
1860	5,828		29.1%
1870	6,456		10.8%
1880	7,344		13.8%
1890	9,390		27.9%
1900	15,421		64.2%
1910	19,874		28.9%
1920	20,713		4.2%
1930	24,110		16.4%
1940	23,586		−2.2%
1950	20,880		−11.5%
1960	18,564		−11.1%
1970	18,638		0.4%
1980	25,280		35.6%
1990	22,646		−10.4%
2000	23,459		3.6%
2010	24,233		3.3%
2020	22,155		−8.6%
2025 (est.)	21,834	▼	−1.4%
U.S. Decennial Census; 1790-1960 1900-1990; 1990-2000 2010

=== 2020 census ===
As of the 2020 census, the parish had a population of 22,155, 9,202 households, and 6,057 families. The median age was 43.4 years, 23.0% of residents were under the age of 18, and 21.9% were 65 years of age or older. For every 100 females there were 99.0 males, and for every 100 females age 18 and over there were 97.3 males age 18 and over.

The racial makeup of the parish was 67.9% White, 15.9% Black or African American, 8.7% American Indian and Alaska Native, 0.3% Asian, 0.1% Native Hawaiian and Pacific Islander, 1.0% from some other race, and 6.2% from two or more races. Hispanic or Latino residents of any race comprised 3.2% of the population.

Less than 0.1% of residents lived in urban areas, while 100.0% lived in rural areas.

There were 9,202 households in the parish, of which 28.7% had children under the age of 18 living in them. Of all households, 46.4% were married-couple households, 20.7% were households with a male householder and no spouse or partner present, and 27.3% were households with a female householder and no spouse or partner present. About 30.5% of all households were made up of individuals and 14.8% had someone living alone who was 65 years of age or older.

There were 13,370 housing units, of which 31.2% were vacant. Among occupied housing units, 78.6% were owner-occupied and 21.4% were renter-occupied. The homeowner vacancy rate was 1.2% and the rental vacancy rate was 12.9%.

=== Racial and ethnic composition ===
Sabine Parish, Louisiana – Racial and ethnic composition Note: the US Census treats Hispanic/Latino as an ethnic category. This table excludes Latinos from the racial categories and assigns them to a separate category. Hispanics/Latinos may be of any race.
Race / Ethnicity (NH = Non-Hispanic)	Pop 1980	Pop 1990	Pop 2000	Pop 2010	Pop 2020	% 1980	% 1990	% 2000	% 2010	% 2020
White alone (NH)	18,126	17,143	16,726	16,776	14,850	71.70%	75.70%	71.30%	69.23%	67.03%
Black or African American alone (NH)	4,644	3,966	3,934	4,009	3,520	18.37%	17.51%	16.77%	16.54%	15.89%
Native American or Alaska Native alone (NH)	457	480	1,666	1,877	1,790	1.81%	2.12%	7.10%	7.75%	8.08%
Asian alone (NH)	25	23	35	53	63	0.10%	0.10%	0.15%	0.22%	0.28%
Native Hawaiian or Pacific Islander alone (NH)	x	x	3	0	12	x	x	0.01%	0.00%	0.05%
Other race alone (NH)	0	3	5	0	69	0.00%	0.01%	0.02%	0.00%	0.31%
Mixed race or Multiracial (NH)	x	x	448	698	1,141	x	x	1.91%	2.88%	5.15%
Hispanic or Latino (any race)	2,028	1,031	642	820	710	8.02%	4.55%	2.74%	3.38%	3.20%
Total	25,280	22,646	23,459	24,233	22,155	100.00%	100.00%	100.00%	100.00%	100.00%

=== 2010 census ===
As of the 2010 United States census, there were 24,233 people living in the parish. 70.8% were White, 16.6% Black or African American, 8.6% Native American, 0.2% Asian, 0.4% of some other race and 3.4% of two or more races. 3.4% were Hispanic or Latino (of any race).

=== 2000 census ===
As of the census of 2000, there were 23,459 people, 9,221 households, and 6,593 families living in the parish. The population density was 27 people per square mile (10 people/km^{2}). There were 13,671 housing units at an average density of 16 per square mile (6.2/km^{2}). The racial makeup of the parish was 72.67% White, 16.87% Black or African American, 7.79% Native American, 0.15% Asian, 0.02% Pacific Islander, 0.32% from other races, and 2.18% from two or more races. 2.74% of the population were Hispanic or Latino of any race.

There were 9,221 households, out of which 31.40% had children under the age of 18 living with them, 55.70% were married couples living together, 12.00% had a female householder with no husband present, and 28.50% were non-families. 26.00% of all households were made up of individuals, and 12.80% had someone living alone who was 65 years of age or older. The average household size was 2.50 and the average family size was 3.00.

In the parish the population was spread out, with 26.20% under the age of 18, 8.30% from 18 to 24, 24.50% from 25 to 44, 24.40% from 45 to 64, and 16.50% who were 65 years of age or older. The median age was 38 years. For every 100 females there were 95.70 males. For every 100 females age 18 and over, there were 92.60 males.

The median income for a household in the parish was $26,655, and the median income for a family was $32,470. Males had a median income of $29,726 versus $18,514 for females. The per capita income for the parish was $15,199. About 16.30% of families and 21.50% of the population were below the poverty line, including 29.00% of those under age 18 and 17.50% of those age 65 or over.

== Education ==
Public schools in Sabine Parish are operated by the Sabine Parish School Board.

It is in the service area of Bossier Parish Community College.

== Communities ==
=== Towns ===
- Many (parish seat and largest municipality)
- Zwolle

=== Villages ===
- Converse
- Fisher
- Florien
- Noble
- Pleasant Hill

=== Unincorporated areas ===
==== Census-designated places ====
- Belmont
- Fort Jesup

==== Other communities ====
- Ebarb
- Negreet

== Hospital ==
- Sabine Medical Center

== Prison ==
Parish

Name	Address	Zip	Aged
Sabine Parish Detention Center	384 Detention Center Rd, Many, Louisiana	71449	18+

== Notable people ==
- H. M. Fowler - Former state representative from Coushatta who spent forty-five days in the Sabine Parish jail in a plea bargain for circumventing state bid laws; brother of longtime Louisiana Custodian of Voting Machines Douglas Fowler and uncle of former Commissioner of Elections Jerry Fowler.
- John Horton Slaughter, known as Texas John Slaughter, legendary western lawman and Texas Ranger.

== Historic places in Sabine Parish ==
- National Register of Historic Places listings in Sabine Parish, Louisiana

== Politics ==
Previously a swing Parish, in 2000 Sabine flipped into the Republican column and has remained there since. In every subsequent presidential election through 2024, the Republican strength increased; in 2024 Donald Trump received nearly 85% of the vote.

United States presidential election results for Sabine Parish, Louisiana
Year	Republican		Democratic		Third party(ies)	
Year	No.	%	No.	%	No.	%
1912	28	3.13%	715	79.89%	152	16.98%
1916	30	2.54%	1,147	97.04%	5	0.42%
1920	111	8.19%	1,245	91.81%	0	0.00%
1924	217	15.47%	1,176	83.82%	10	0.71%
1928	735	34.20%	1,414	65.80%	0	0.00%
1932	110	3.52%	3,008	96.16%	10	0.32%
1936	417	14.55%	2,447	85.41%	1	0.03%
1940	588	16.27%	3,026	83.73%	0	0.00%
1944	1,039	33.66%	2,048	66.34%	0	0.00%
1948	469	11.37%	1,405	34.05%	2,252	54.58%
1952	2,039	38.32%	3,282	61.68%	0	0.00%
1956	2,086	50.46%	1,800	43.54%	248	6.00%
1960	2,419	41.08%	2,412	40.96%	1,058	17.97%
1964	4,165	66.68%	2,081	33.32%	0	0.00%
1968	1,125	16.52%	1,159	17.02%	4,526	66.46%
1972	4,935	73.88%	1,332	19.94%	413	6.18%
1976	3,531	42.28%	4,555	54.54%	265	3.17%
1980	4,265	44.50%	5,100	53.21%	220	2.30%
1984	6,295	66.26%	2,980	31.37%	225	2.37%
1988	4,767	55.81%	3,532	41.35%	242	2.83%
1992	3,586	38.36%	4,173	44.64%	1,589	17.00%
1996	3,543	39.34%	4,263	47.33%	1,201	13.33%
2000	5,754	64.93%	2,846	32.11%	262	2.96%
2004	6,711	70.08%	2,743	28.64%	122	1.27%
2008	7,226	74.87%	2,245	23.26%	181	1.88%
2012	7,738	76.97%	2,194	21.82%	121	1.20%
2016	7,879	80.50%	1,703	17.40%	205	2.09%
2020	8,776	82.82%	1,731	16.34%	89	0.84%
2024	8,613	84.69%	1,488	14.63%	69	0.68%

== See also ==
- Sabine Free State Festival
- Sabine River Spanish – Spanish variety spoken in Texas and Louisiana
