= Many, Louisiana =

- Town
- Louisiana Highway 6 in Many

- Location of Many in Sabine Parish, Louisiana.

- Location of Louisiana in the United States
- Coordinates: 31°34′24″N 93°29′40″W
- Country: United States
- State: Louisiana
- Parish: Sabine
- Founded: 1837 (189 years ago)
- Incorporated: March 21, 1843 (183 years ago)

Area
  - Total: 3.41 sq mi (8.82 km^{2})
  - Land: 3.41 sq mi (8.82 km^{2})
  - Water: 0 sq mi (0.00 km^{2})
- Elevation: 272 ft (83 m)

Population (2020)
  - Total: 2,571
  - Density: 754.6/sq mi (291.37/km^{2})
- Time zone: UTC-6 (CST)
  - Summer (DST): UTC-5 (CDT)
- ZIP Code: 71449
- Area code: 318
- FIPS code: 22-48470
- GNIS feature ID: 2406092
- Website: www.townofmany.org

Many (/ˈmæni/) is a town in and the parish seat of Sabine Parish in western Louisiana, United States. As of the 2020 census, Many had a population of 2,571.

== History ==
The site where Many currently sits was originally a Belgian settlement believed to be founded in 1837. The Town of Many was officially founded March 21, 1843, when the Louisiana Legislature passed Act 46. The act split Natchitoches Parish into several new parishes, including Sabine Parish. That Act declared that the seat of government for the newly created Sabine Parish, be named in honor of Colonel James B. Many, who commanded the garrison at the nearby Fort Jesup.

== Geography ==
According to the United States Census Bureau, the town has a total area of 3.1 square miles (8.0 km^{2}), all land.

=== Climate ===
Climate is characterized by relatively high temperatures and evenly distributed precipitation throughout the year. According to the Köppen Climate Classification system, Many has a humid subtropical climate, abbreviated "Cfa" on climate maps.

Climate data for Many, Louisiana
Month	Jan	Feb	Mar	Apr	May	Jun	Jul	Aug	Sep	Oct	Nov	Dec	Year
Mean daily maximum °F (°C)	58 (14)	62 (17)	69 (21)	77 (25)	84 (29)	90 (32)	93 (34)	93 (34)	88 (31)	79 (26)	68 (20)	61 (16)	77 (25)
Mean daily minimum °F (°C)	34 (1)	38 (3)	44 (7)	52 (11)	61 (16)	67 (19)	70 (21)	69 (21)	64 (18)	51 (11)	43 (6)	36 (2)	52 (11)
Average precipitation inches (cm)	5 (13)	4.6 (12)	4.6 (12)	4.1 (10)	5 (13)	4.5 (11)	4 (10)	3.7 (9.4)	3.6 (9.1)	3.9 (9.9)	4.4 (11)	5.5 (14)	53 (130)
Source: Weatherbase

== Demographics ==
Historical population
Census	Pop.	Note	%±
1880	143		—
1890	133		−7.0%
1900	354		166.2%
1910	683		92.9%
1920	668		−2.2%
1930	1,239		85.5%
1940	1,474		19.0%
1950	1,681		14.0%
1960	3,164		88.2%
1970	3,112		−1.6%
1980	3,988		28.1%
1990	3,112		−22.0%
2000	2,889		−7.2%
2010	2,853		−1.2%
2020	2,571		−9.9%
2025 (est.)	2,469	▼	−4.0%
U.S. Decennial Census

=== 2020 census ===
Many racial composition
Race	Number	Percentage
White (non-Hispanic)	1,083	42.12%
Black or African American (non-Hispanic)	1,303	50.68%
Native American	18	0.7%
Asian	12	0.47%
Pacific Islander	1	0.04%
Other/Mixed	105	4.08%
Hispanic or Latino	49	1.91%

As of the 2020 United States census, there were 2,571 people, 898 households, and 543 families residing in the town.

=== 2010 census ===
As of the 2010 United States census, there were 2,853 people living in the town. The racial makeup of the town was 48.1% Black, 44.3% White, 1.5% Native American, 0.7% Asian and 2.6% from two or more races. 2.8% were Hispanic or Latino of any race.

=== 2000 census ===
The population density was 923.4 inhabitants per square mile (356.5/km^{2}). There were 1,272 housing units at an average density of 406.5 per square mile (157.0/km^{2}). The racial makeup of the town was 48.18% White, 47.42% African American, 1.70% Native American, 0.48% Asian, 0.03% Pacific Islander, 0.28% from other races, and 1.90% from two or more races. Hispanic or Latino of any race were 1.70% of the population.

There were 1,073 households, out of which 32.2% had children under the age of 18 living with them, 34.6% were married couples living together, 23.9% had a female householder with no husband present, and 38.3% were non-families. 34.8% of all households were made up of individuals, and 15.6% had someone living alone who was 65 years of age or older. The average household size was 2.41 and the average family size was 3.14.

In the town, the population was spread out, with 26.5% under the age of 18, 10.8% from 18 to 24, 23.7% from 25 to 44, 20.9% from 45 to 64, and 18.0% who were 65 years of age or older. The median age was 36 years. For every 100 females, there were 82.4 males. For every 100 females age 18 and over, there were 76.3 males.

The median income for a household in the town was $20,000, and the median income for a family was $24,329. Males had a median income of $28,500 versus $15,870 for females. The per capita income for the town was $12,153. About 28.4% of families and 35.5% of the population were below the poverty line, including 46.7% of those under age 18 and 26.3% of those age 65 or over.

== Culture ==
- Hodges Gardens, Park and Wilderness Area

== Education ==
Public schools in Sabine Parish are operated by the Sabine Parish School Board. The town of Many is zoned to Many Elementary School (Grades PK-4), Many Junior High School (Grades 5–8), and Many High School (Grades 9–12).

Many is also home to the Central Louisiana Technical College's Sabine Valley Campus. The campus offers technical education programs, general education courses, high school dual enrollment, adult basic education, and workforce development training.

== Media ==
=== Newspaper ===
- The Sabine Index

=== Radio ===
All of the radio stations in Many are in the Natchitoches market.

Frequency	Callsign	Format	Owner
89.3	KAVK	Religious	American Family Association
99.9	KTEZ	Adult contemporary	Baldridge-Dumas Communications
107.1	KWLV	Country	Baldridge-Dumas Communications

== Notable people ==
- U.S. Representative Ed Gossett was born 1902 in a sawmill camp known as Yellow Pine, near Many.
- Charlie Joiner, former National Football League wide receiver and member of the Pro Football Hall of Fame
- Frances (Poppy) Northcutt, the first female engineer to work in NASA's Mission Control during Apollo 8.
- Ronald G. Tompkins, American physician and academic

== Gallery ==
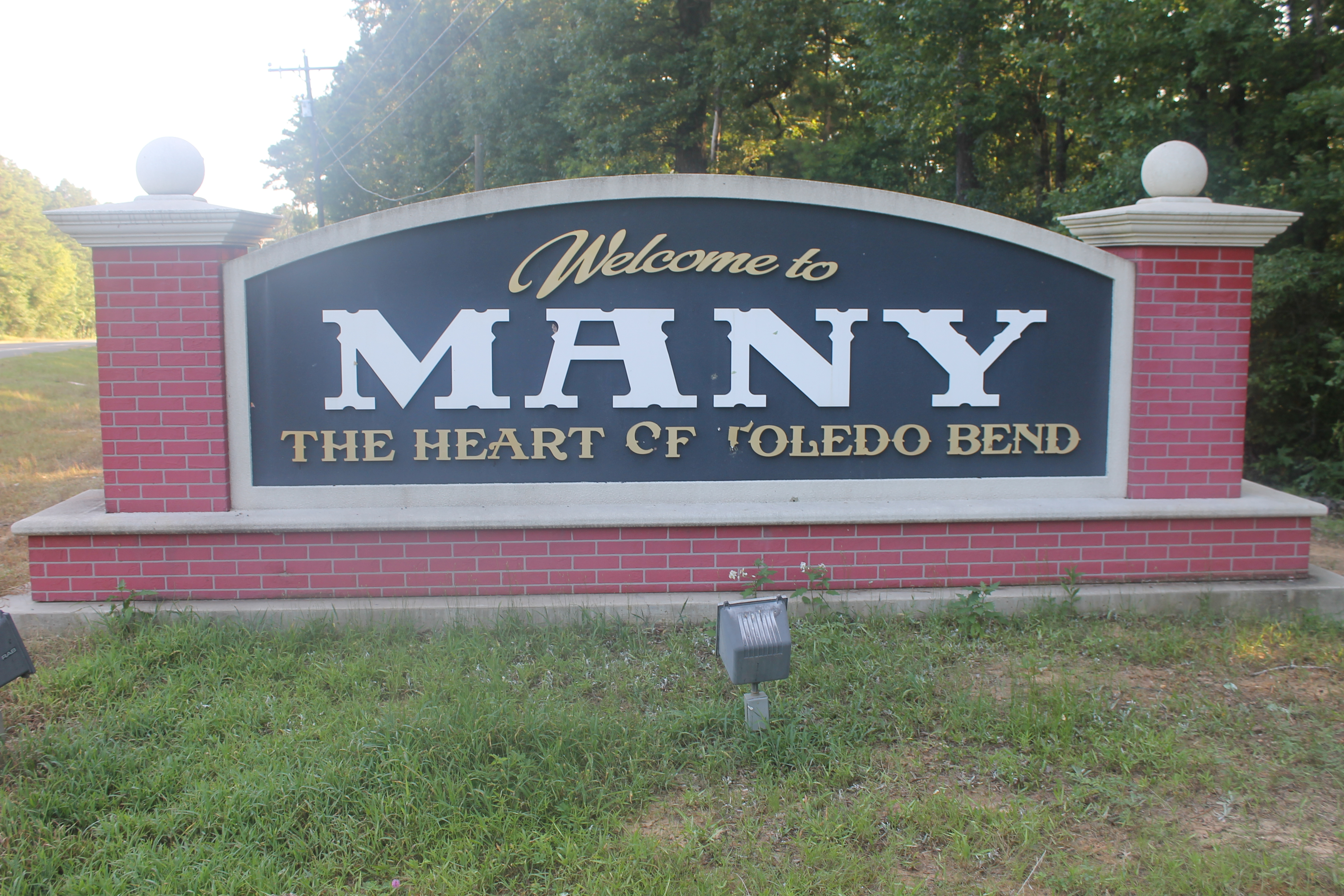
Many welcome sign

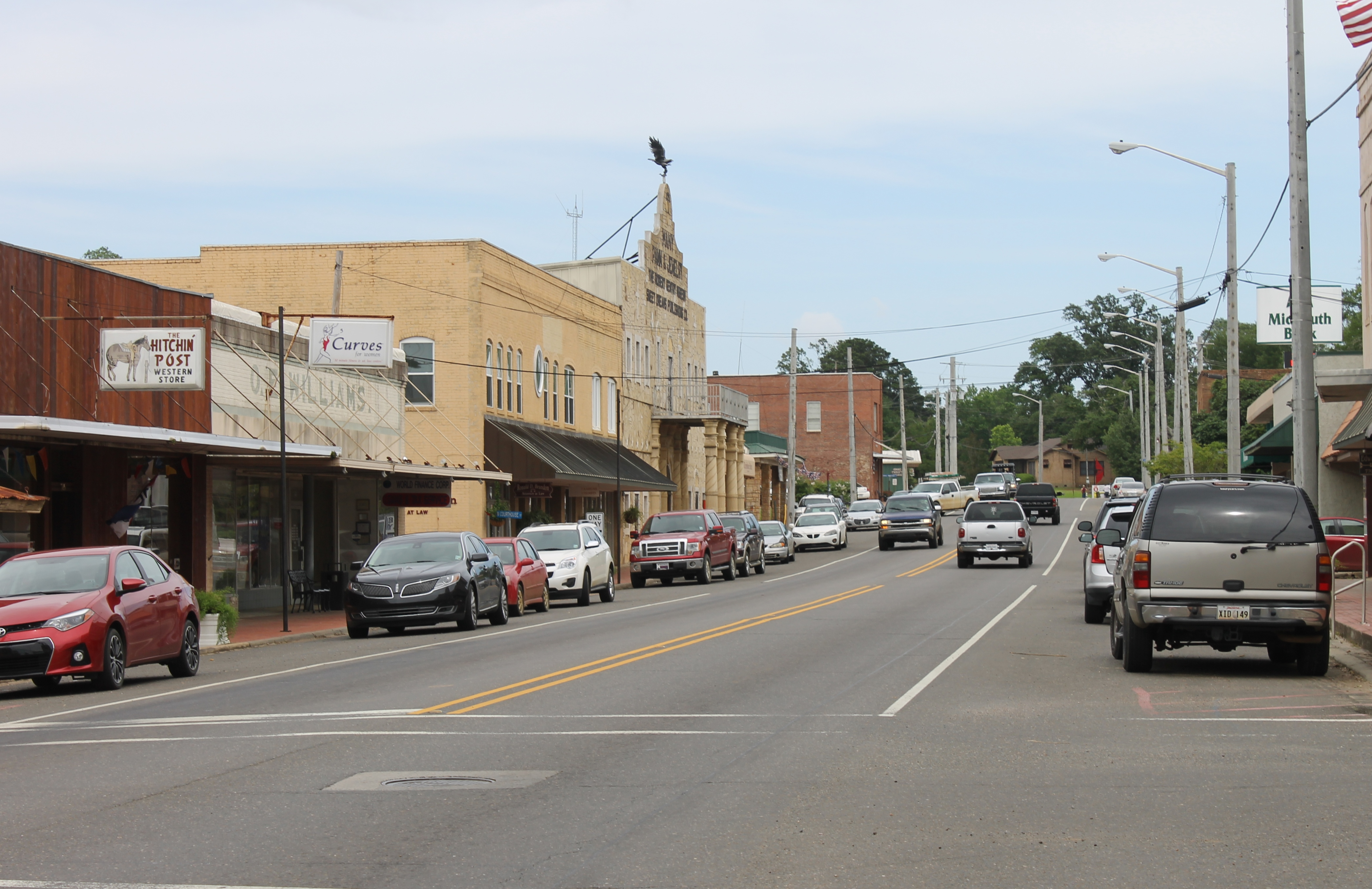
Downtown Many facing east

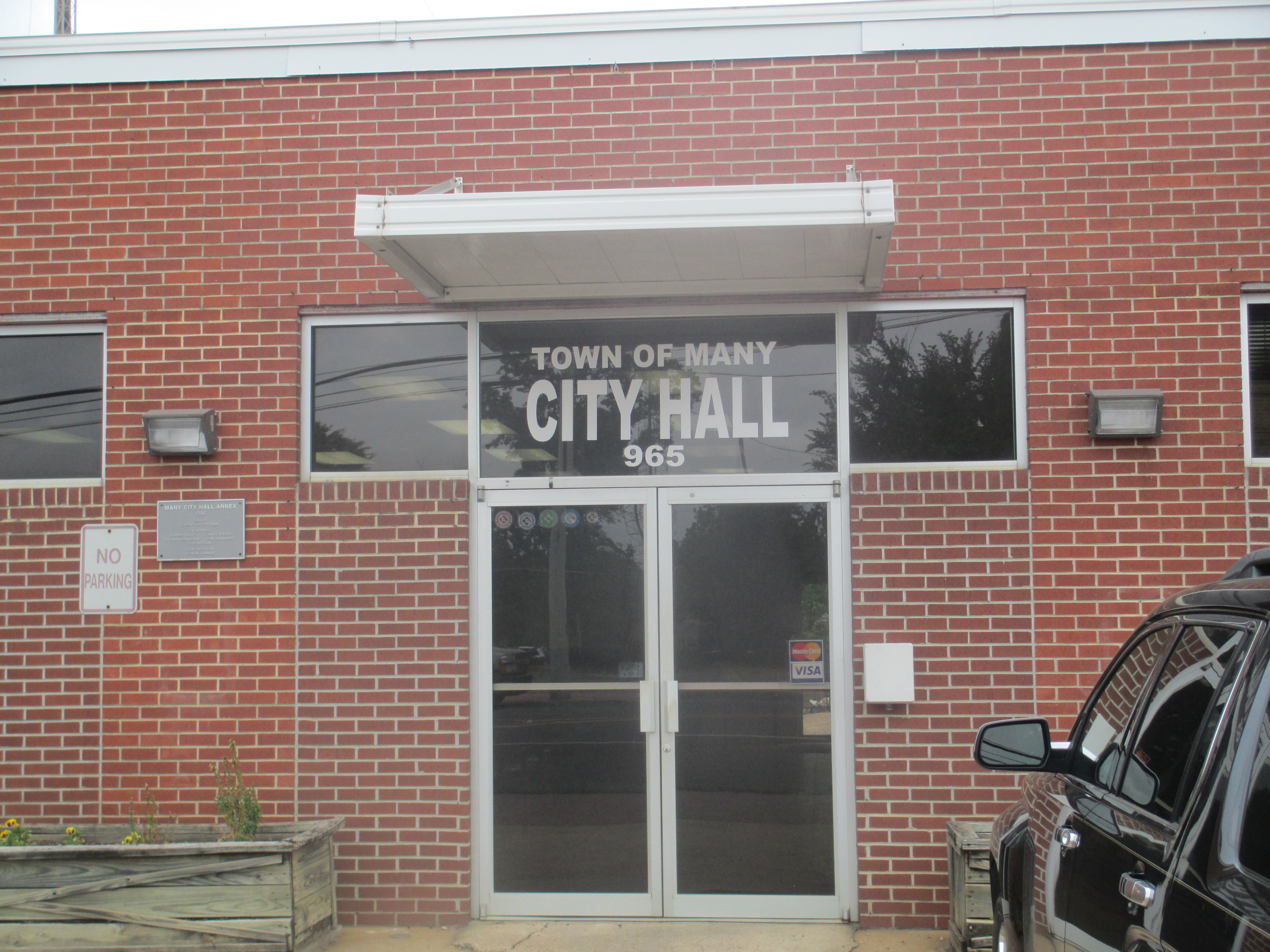
Many City Hall

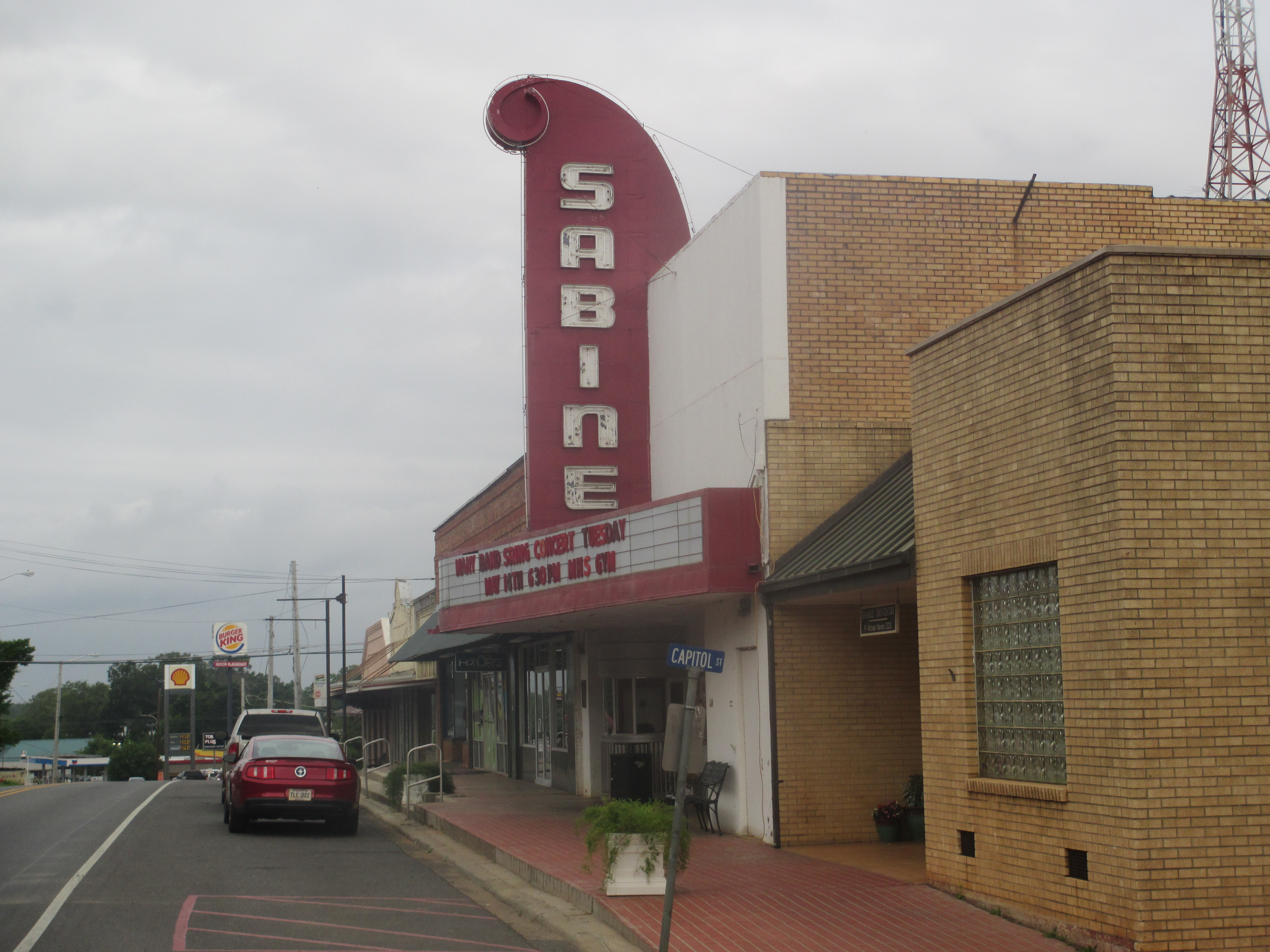
Sabine Theater

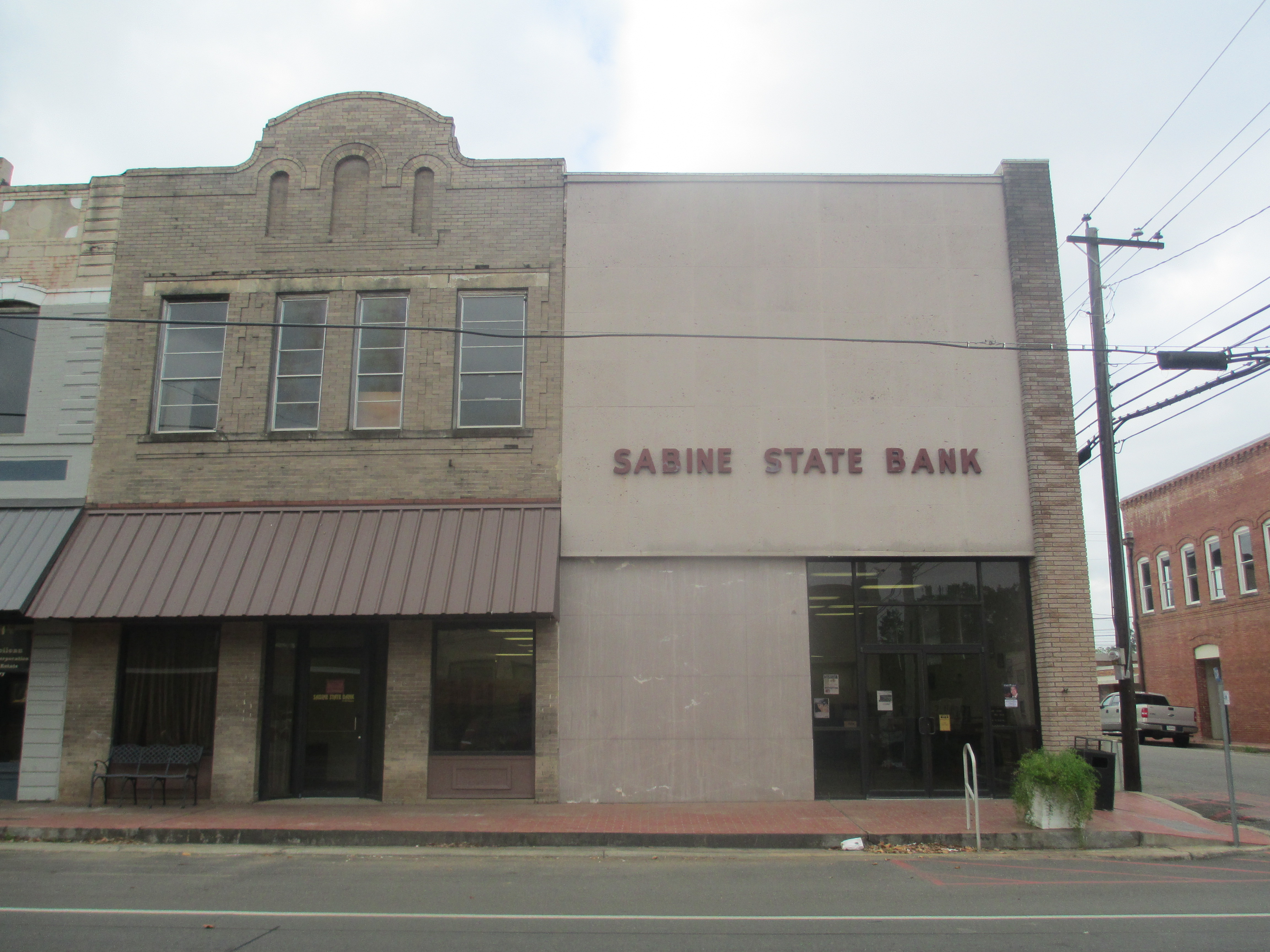
Sabine State Bank
