= National Register of Historic Places listings in DeSoto Parish, Louisiana =

Location of DeSoto Parish in Louisiana

This is a list of the National Register of Historic Places listings in DeSoto Parish, Louisiana.

This is intended to be a complete list of the properties and districts on the National Register of Historic Places in DeSoto Parish, Louisiana, United States. The locations of National Register properties and districts for which the latitude and longitude coordinates are included below, may be seen in a map.

There are 28 properties and districts listed on the National Register in the parish. Three properties were once listed, but have since been removed.

This National Park Service list is complete through NPS recent listings posted March 13, 2026.

== Current listings ==
	Name on the Register	Image	Date listed	Location	City or town	Description
1	Allen House	Allen House	July 28, 1988 (#88001154)	About 650 yards (590 m) west of intersection between Smyrna Road and Philips Lane, and about 2.2 miles (3.5 km) southeast of Keachi; 32°09′35″N 93°53′25″W	Keachi	
2	Bank of Grand Cane	Bank of Grand Cane	February 11, 1988 (#88000105)	8356 US 171; 32°05′03″N 93°48′36″W	Grand Cane	Also a contributing property of Grand Cane Historic District since its creation on July 7, 1995.
3	Buena Vista	Buena Vista	January 19, 1989 (#88003197)	On Buena Vista Road, about 550 yards (500 m) from its junction with Red Bluff Road and about 3.8 miles (6.1 km) southeast of Stonewall; 32°14′01″N 93°47′37″W	Stonewall	
4	Caddo Parish Confederate Monument	Caddo Parish Confederate Monument	January 29, 2014 (#13001124)	23271 LA-175; 31°51′12″N 93°30′50″W	Pelican	Moved from Shreveport in 2022.
5	Community Rosenwald School	Community Rosenwald School	July 22, 2009 (#09000545)	Along LA 3015, about 5.9 miles (9.5 km) northeast of Grand Cane; 32°06′25″N 93°42′47″W	Grand Cane	
6	DeSoto Parish Courthouse	DeSoto Parish Courthouse	January 22, 1987 (#86003677)	101 Texas Street; 32°02′19″N 93°42′38″W	Mansfield	Also a contributing property of Mansfield Historic District since its creation on October 27, 1988.
7	Grand Cane Historic District	Grand Cane Historic District	July 7, 1995 (#95000815)	Along US 171, roughly between Burrow Street and Graham Street; 32°05′03″N 93°48′35″W	Grand Cane	The 1.5 acres (0.61 ha) area comprises a total of seven contributing properties, built between 1882 and 1939.
8	Grand Cane United Methodist Church	Grand Cane United Methodist Church	January 28, 1992 (#91002024)	8446 US 171; 32°04′54″N 93°48′33″W	Grand Cane	
9	International Boundary Marker	International Boundary Marker	April 13, 1977 (#77001463)	On Louisiana-Texas border, at intersection of FM 31 and LA 765; 32°02′03″N 94°02′34″W	Logansport	Extends into Panola County, Texas
10	Keachi Baptist Church	Keachi Baptist Church	October 20, 1988 (#88002039)	About 100 yards (91 m) south of LA 172, shortly west of its intersection with Depot Road; 32°11′19″N 93°54′34″W	Keachi	
11	Keachi Presbyterian Church	Keachi Presbyterian Church	June 30, 1988 (#88000981)	Along LA 5, about 280 yards (260 m) east of its intersection with LA 789; 32°11′19″N 93°54′11″W	Keachi	
12	Keachi Store	Keachi Store	October 20, 1988 (#88002036)	Northwestern corner of LA 172 and LA 789; 32°11′19″N 93°54′21″W	Keachi	
13	Keachi United Methodist Church	Keachi United Methodist Church	July 14, 1988 (#88001046)	Along LA 5, about 165 yards (151 m) east of its intersection with LA 789; 32°11′19″N 93°54′14″W	Keachi	
14	Liberty Lodge No. 123, F&AM	Liberty Lodge No. 123, F&AM	January 13, 1989 (#88003136)	Southwestern corner of LA 172 and LA 5; 32°11′18″N 93°54′22″W	Keachi	
15	Longstreet Rosenwald School	Longstreet Rosenwald School	July 22, 2009 (#09000546)	Along Louisiana Highway 5, about 1.6 miles (2.6 km) north of Longstreet; 32°07′18″N 93°56′33″W	Longstreet	
16	Mansfield Battle Park	Mansfield Battle Park	April 13, 1973 (#73002131)	15149 LA 175, about 2.8 miles (4.5 km) southeast of Mansfield; 32°00′39″N 93°39′54″W	Mansfield vicinity	
17	Mansfield Historic District	Mansfield Historic District	October 27, 1988 (#88002067)	Texas Street and Adams Street around Courthouse Square; 32°02′18″N 93°42′38″W	Mansfield	The 3 acres (1.2 ha) area comprises a total of 9 contributing properties built between 1905 and 1928.
18	Mundy-McFarland House	Mundy-McFarland House	December 6, 1979 (#79003120)	200 Welsh Street; 32°02′09″N 93°42′46″W	Mansfield	
19	Myrtle Hill Plantation House	Myrtle Hill Plantation House	December 4, 1974 (#74002185)	On Myrtle Hill Road, about 3.6 miles (5.8 km) southeast of Gloster; 32°09′41″N 93°46′05″W	Gloster	
20	The Oaks	The Oaks	January 19, 1989 (#88003203)	Along LA 172, about 2 miles (3.2 km) west of Keachi; 32°10′59″N 93°56′21″W	Keachi	
21	Prude House	Prude House	July 14, 1988 (#88001048)	Along LA 5, about 3 miles (4.8 km) southwest of Keachi; 32°08′51″N 93°55′24″W	Keachi	
22	Roseneath	Roseneath	January 13, 1989 (#88003137)	5030 LA 5, about 2.8 miles (4.5 km) southeast of Gloster; 32°10′35″N 93°46′24″W	Gloster	
23	Thomas Scott House	Thomas Scott House	November 6, 1986 (#86003131)	About 450 yards (410 m) north of LA 5 and about 3.5 miles (5.6 km) east of Gloster; 32°10′51″N 93°45′32″W	Gloster	
24	Spell House	Spell House	July 14, 1988 (#88001047)	Along LA 5, about 0.5 miles (0.80 km) southwest of Keachi; 32°10′59″N 93°54′43″W	Keachi	
25	Stribling House	Stribling House	May 11, 1989 (#89000403)	Along US 84, about 9.7 miles (15.6 km) southwest of Mansfield; 31°58′33″N 93°50′48″W	Mansfield	
26	Swearingen House	Swearingen House	November 17, 1988 (#88002658)	Along LA 5, about 0.77 miles (1.24 km) east of Keachi; 32°11′21″N 93°53′33″W	Keachi	
27	U.S. Post Office	U.S. Post Office	January 12, 1983 (#83000497)	100 North Jefferson Street; 32°02′17″N 93°42′32″W	Mansfield	
28	Wood Park	Wood Park	January 21, 1983 (#83000498)	End of Addison Road, about 1.2 miles (1.9 km) south of LA 175 and about 4.3 miles (6.9 km) southeast of Mansfield; 31°59′13″N 93°39′29″W	Mansfield	Also known as Glassell-Turner House.

== Former listings ==
	Name on the Register	Image	Date listed	Date removed	Location	City or town	Description
1	Kansas City Southern Depot		January 19, 1989 (#88003198)	January 31, 2019	Along Kansas City Southern railroad tracks, shortly south of Polk Street; 32°02′12″N 93°42′01″W	Mansfield	
2	Land's End Plantation		April 26, 1972 (#72001453)	March 19, 2024	End of Parish Road 793, 0.5 miles (0.80 km) north of Red Bluff Road, about 5 miles (8.0 km) southeast of Stonewall; 32°14′50″N 93°44′49″W	Stonewall	Plantation house was completely destroyed by fire in 1989.
3	Williams House	Williams House	July 22, 1994 (#94000682)	March 19, 2024	407 Texas Street; 32°02′19″N 93°42′28″W	Mansfield	

== See also ==
- Guy House (Natchitoches, Louisiana): listed in DeSoto Parish but later relocated to Natchitoches Parish
- List of National Historic Landmarks in Louisiana
- National Register of Historic Places listings in Louisiana
