= Longstreet Rosenwald School =

School in Keachi, Louisiana (1924–1960s)

- U.S. National Register of Historic Places
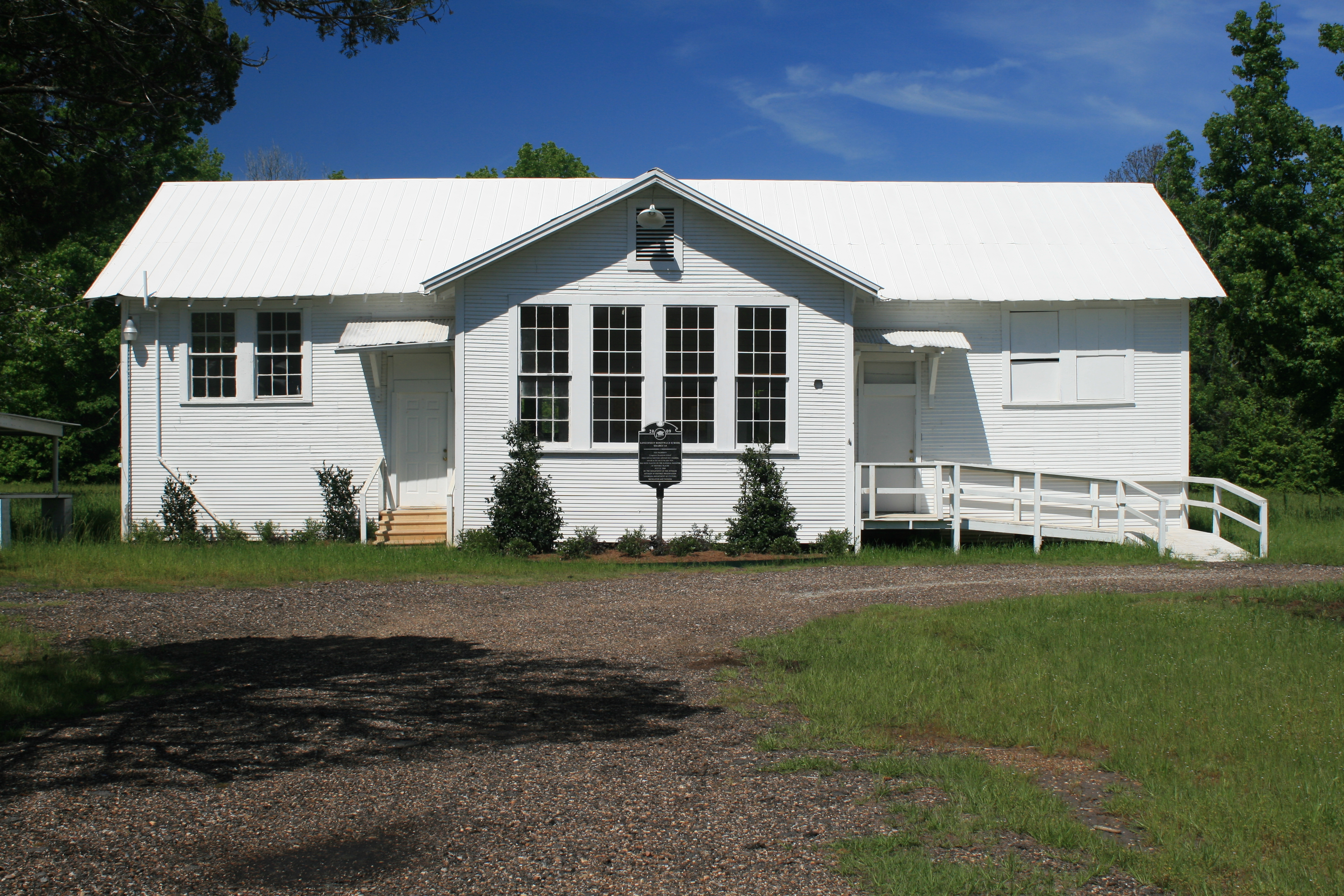

- Location within Louisiana
- Location: Along Louisiana Highway 5, about 1.6 miles (2.6 km) in Keachi, DeSoto Parish, Louisiana, U.S.
- Nearest city: Longstreet, Louisiana, U.S.
- Coordinates: 32°06′36″N 93°56′50″W
- Area: 6.3 acres (2.5 ha)
- Built: 1924
- NRHP reference No.: 09000546
- Added to NRHP: July 22, 2009

Longstreet Rosenwald School (1924–1969) was a two-room Rosenwald school for African American students in Keachi, DeSoto Parish, and near Longstreet, Louisiana. It is listed on the National Register of Historic Places since July 22, 2009, for educational and African American history. It briefly was called Longstreet High School in later years, and is now known as the Longstreet Rosenwald School Community Center.

== History ==
The Longstreet Rosenwald School was built in the 1923–1924 school year at a total cost of US$2,350, with the Rosenwald fund providing $700; the local African American community raising $1,250; and $400 provided from public sources. It offered classes between grade 1 through grade 8. The Longstreet Rosenwald School was only public elementary school for African American students in the area, between 1924 and 1959. It had been part of the Longstreet School District.

In the 1943–1944 school year, the enrollment was 81 students (between all grades), and had two teachers.

== Closure and modern usage ==
After the school was remodeled by 1965, the Rosenwald building was used as a school auditorium and additional buildings added to the surrounding property to form "Longstreet High School". The campus was closed by the DeSoto Parish School Board in 1969, for issues with bussing students long distances and a decline in local population. By 1970, the school district was integrated.

The state of Louisiana built 393 Rosenwald schools between 1914 and 1932, and as of 2009, only 3 buildings survive (Longstreet Rosenwald School, Plaisance School, and Community Rosenwald School). In 2001, the former school building was leased for use as a community center, now the Longstreet Rosenwald School Community Center.

== See also ==
- National Register of Historic Places listings in DeSoto Parish, Louisiana
- List of Rosenwald schools
