= Keachi Presbyterian Church =

Historic church in Louisiana, United States

- U.S. National Register of Historic Places
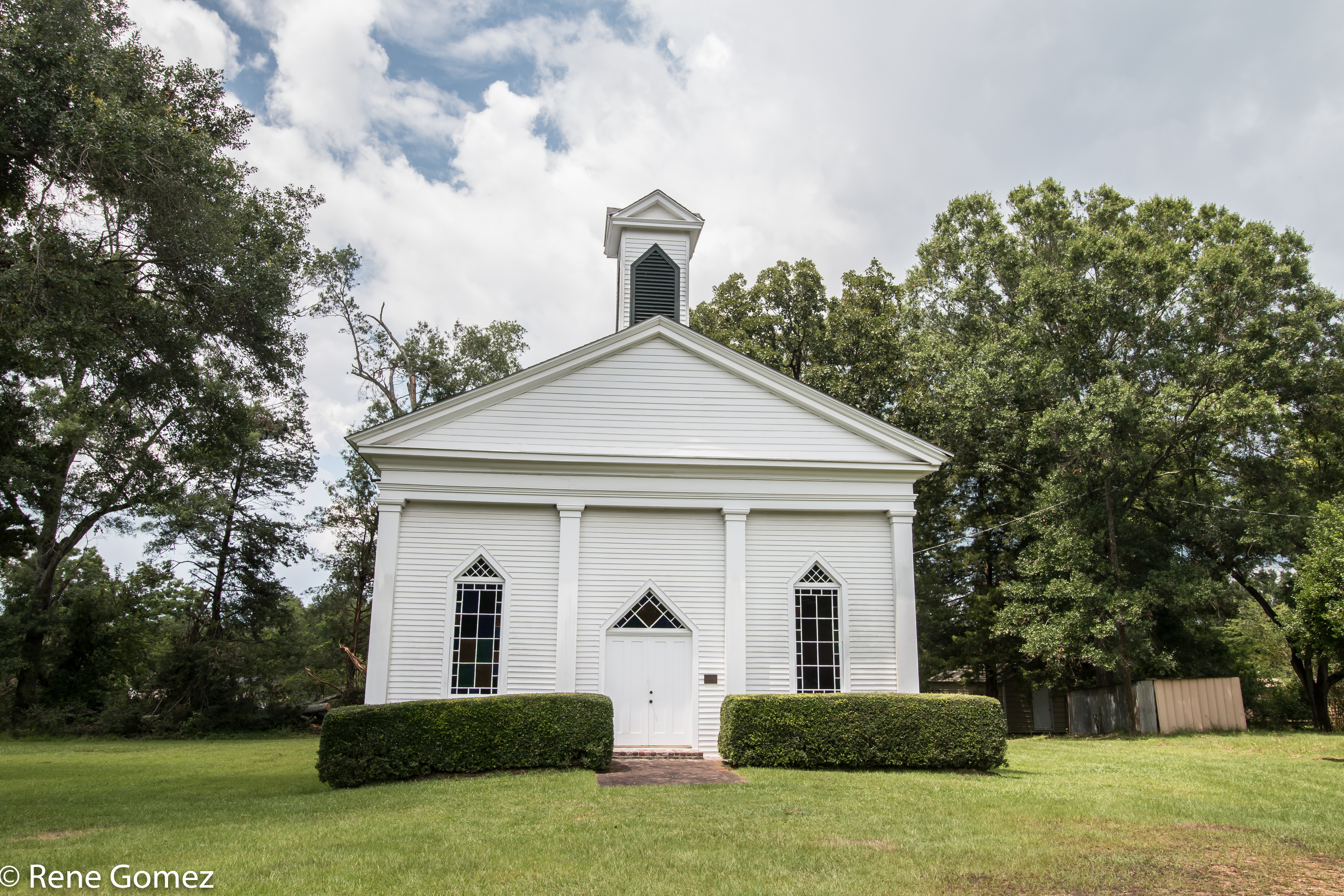
- Church in 2017

- Location within Louisiana Location within the United States
- Location: Along LA 5, about 280 yards (260 m) east of its intersection with LA 789, Keachi, Louisiana
- Coordinates: 32°11′19″N 93°54′11″W
- Area: 1.168 acres (0.473 ha)
- Built: 1858
- Architectural style: Greek Revival
- NRHP reference No.: 88000981
- Added to NRHP: June 30, 1988

Keachi Presbyterian Church is a historic Presbyterian church located on Louisiana Highway 5 in Keachi in DeSoto Parish in northwestern Louisiana.

It was built in 1858 in Greek Revival style and it was deemed to be "the finest" among merely seven country Greek Revival churches in the state of Louisiana, three of which happen to be in Keachi.

Its portico with four Doric columns was enclosed in renovations in the 1890s, and the building's cupola appears to have been added then as well.

The church was added to the National Register of Historic Places on June 30, 1988.

== See also ==
- National Register of Historic Places listings in DeSoto Parish, Louisiana
