= Myrtle Hill Plantation House =

- U.S. National Register of Historic Places
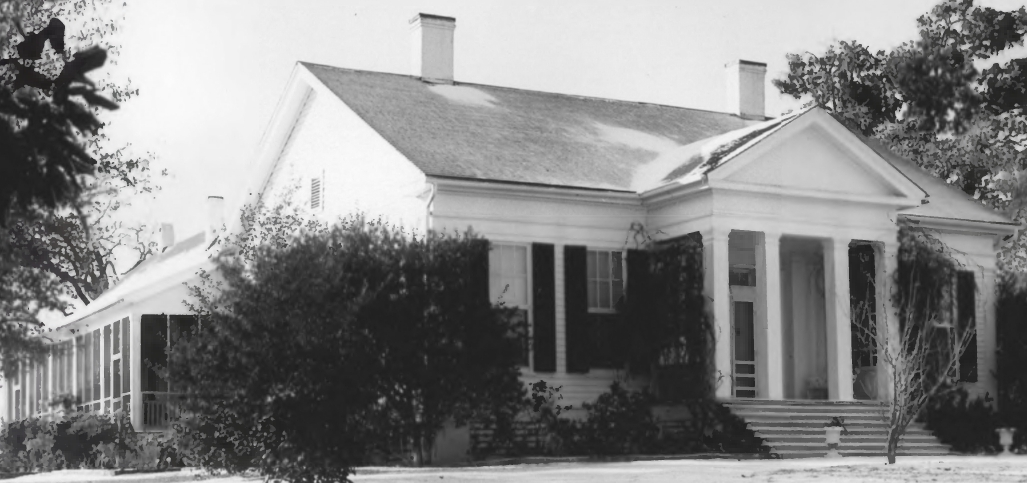
- Myrtle Hill Plantation House on December 14, 1963.

- Location within Louisiana Location within the United States
- Location: On Myrtle Hill Road, about 3.6 miles (5.8 km) southeast of Gloster
- Nearest city: Gloster, Louisiana
- Coordinates: 32°09′41″N 93°46′05″W
- Area: 10 acres (4.0 ha)
- Built: c.1852
- Built by: Robbins Brothers
- Architectural style: Greek Revival
- NRHP reference No.: 74002185
- Added to NRHP: December 4, 1974

The Myrtle Hill Plantation House is a historic plantation house located along Myrtle Hill Road, near Gloster, Louisiana in DeSoto Parish.

The original 40 by 55 feet (12 m × 17 m) Greek Revival house was built by slave labor between 1835 and 1840.

The English Robbins brothers were brought to Louisiana in the 1830s to build several homes in the Gloster and Kingston area. They were paid $500 worth of gold to oversee enslaved Africans in their building of the Myrtle Hill Plantation House.

The present building was built in 1852 by Edward Riggs. The walls are framed with 3 by 6 inches (0.076 m × 0.152 m) rough-sawn or hand-hewn posts.

The house was listed on the National Register of Historic Places on December 4, 1974.

== See also ==
- National Register of Historic Places listings in DeSoto Parish, Louisiana
