= Liberty Lodge No. 123, F&AM =

- Liberty Lodge No. 123, F & A M
- U.S. National Register of Historic Places
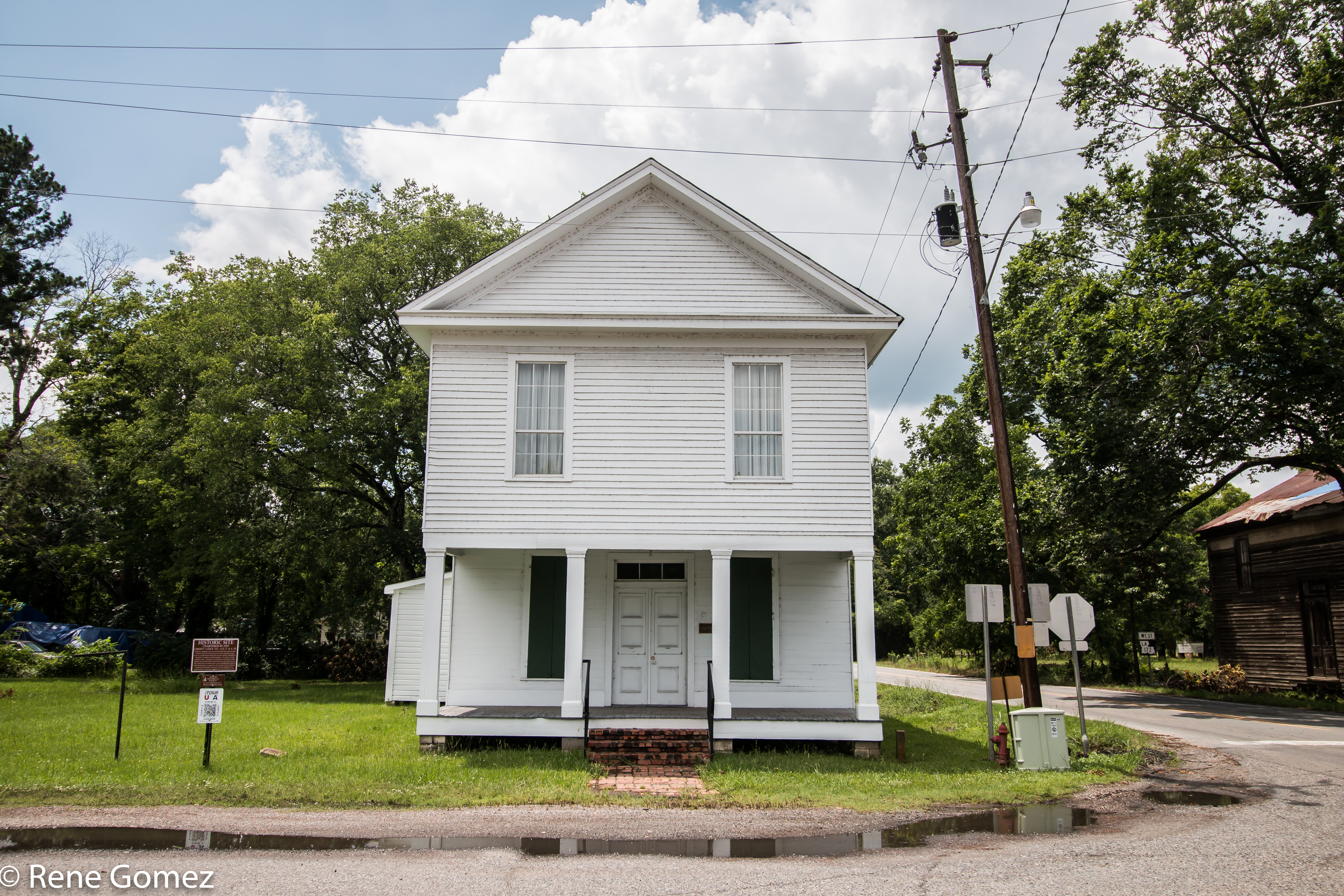

- Location within Louisiana
- Location: LA 5 and 172, Keachi, Louisiana
- Coordinates: 32°11′18″N 93°54′22″W
- Area: less than one acre
- Built: c.1852, 1880
- Architectural style: Greek Revival
- NRHP reference No.: 88003136
- Added to NRHP: January 13, 1989

Liberty Lodge No. 123, F & A M, in Keachi in DeSoto Parish, Louisiana, was built originally around 1852 and was rebuilt in 1880 after being destroyed by a tornado. It was listed on the National Register of Historic Places in 1989.

It is a two-story frame building in late Greek Revival style, and stands prominently in the small community of Keachi. It has a space for a store on the first floor and the Free and Accepted Masons lodge meeting hall on the second floor. Extra rooms and an enclosed staircase are to the rear.

Its front facade has a three-bay entrance loggia with a "fairly full" entablature topped by the clapboarded second story. Above that is a full pediment with similar entablature. Elements salvaged from the original building include the loggia's columns, entablature and flushboarding, the pediment's detailing, and apparently some six over six windows. The interior has a mix of surfaces; the meeting hall's interior is non-historic, with plywood paneling and an acoustical tile ceiling.

It is located at the southwestern corner of LA 172 and LA 5.

== See also ==
- List of Masonic buildings in the United States
- National Register of Historic Places listings in DeSoto Parish, Louisiana
