= Thomas Scott House (Gloster, Louisiana) =

Historic house in Louisiana, United States

- U.S. National Register of Historic Places
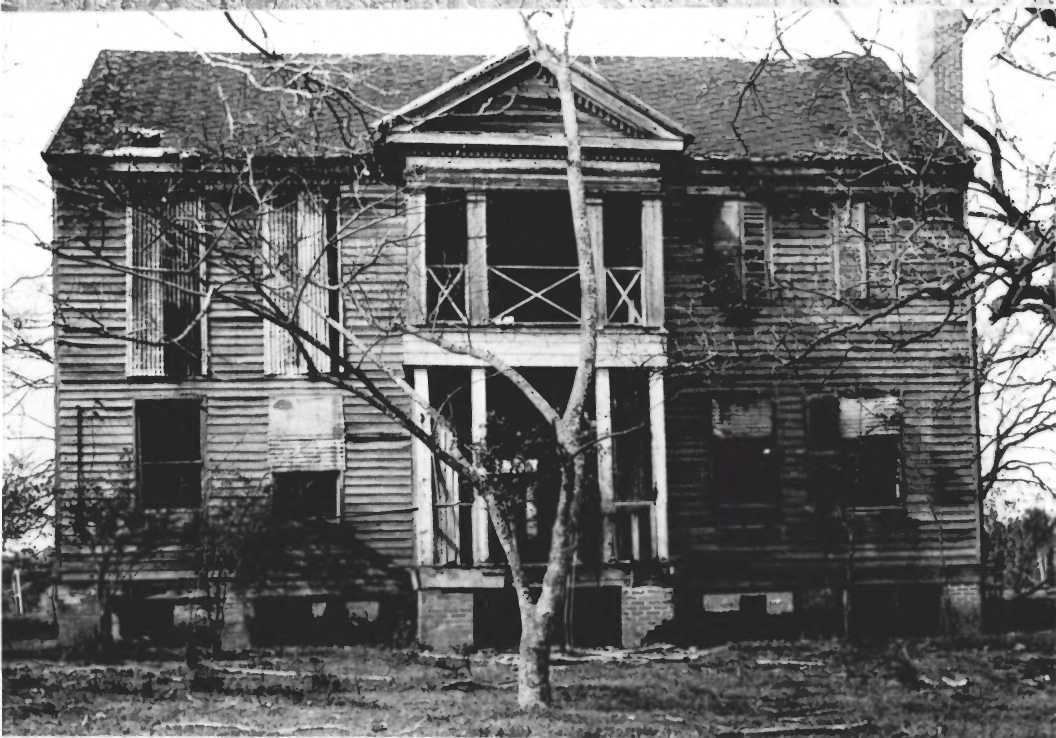

- Location within Louisiana Location within the United States
- Location: About 450 yards (410 m) north of LA 5 and about 3.5 miles (5.6 km) east of Gloster
- Nearest city: Gloster, Louisiana
- Coordinates: 32°10′51″N 93°45′32″W
- Area: 1 acre (0.40 ha)
- Built: 1858
- Built by: Thomas Scott
- Architectural style: Greek Revival
- NRHP reference No.: 86003131
- Added to NRHP: November 6, 1986

Thomas Scott House is a Greek Revival plantation house located north of Louisiana Highway 5, about 3.5 miles (5.6 km) east of Gloster in DeSoto Parish, Louisiana.

Built in 1858, the mansion has a pedimented two-story entrance portico with Doric posts and pilasters. At the time of its NRHP nomination it was in somewhat deteriorated condition.

The house was listed on the National Register of Historic Places on November 6, 1986.

== See also ==
- National Register of Historic Places listings in DeSoto Parish, Louisiana
