= Keachi United Methodist Church =

Historic church in Louisiana, United States

- U.S. National Register of Historic Places
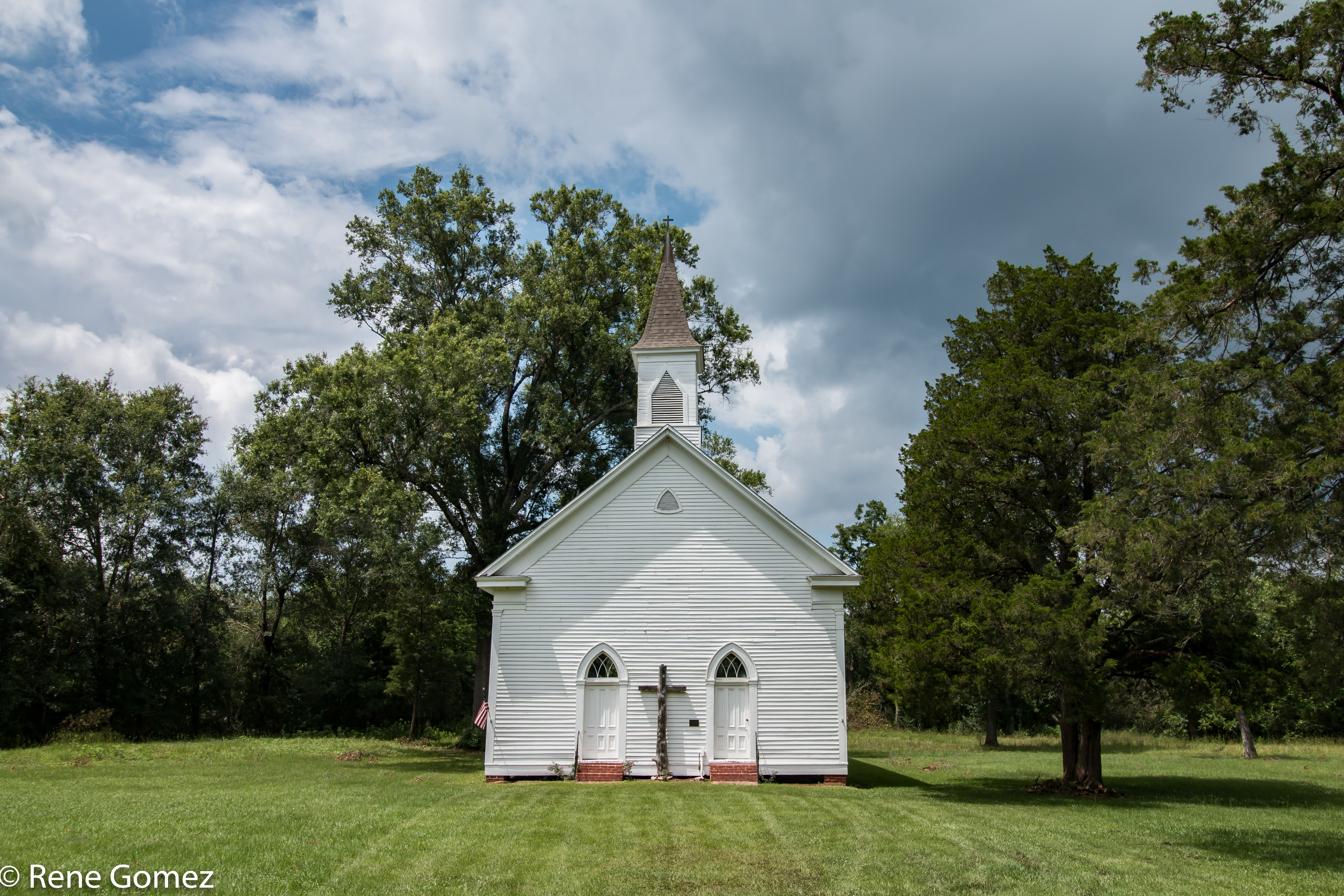

- Location within Louisiana Location within the United States
- Location: Along LA 5, about 165 yards (151 m) east of its intersection with LA 789Keachi, Louisiana
- Coordinates: 32°11′19″N 93°54′14″W
- Area: 1.673 acres (0.677 ha)
- Built: 1879
- Architectural style: Greek Revival, Gothic Revival
- NRHP reference No.: 88001046
- Added to NRHP: July 14, 1988

Keachi United Methodist Church is a historic Methodist church located on Louisiana Highway 5 in Keachi in DeSoto Parish, Louisiana in northwestern Louisiana.

Built in 1879, it is a wood frame transitional Greek Revival/Gothic Revival church. It has two front doors corresponding to two aisles inside. It has a steep roof with a thin belfry and a pointed spire. Greek Revival elements include gable end returns, a full entablature, and corner pilasters with molded capitals. Gothic Revival elements include lancet arch windows and doors. In 1988 the church was very well-preserved.

The church was added to the National Register of Historic Places on July 14, 1988.

== See also ==
- National Register of Historic Places listings in DeSoto Parish, Louisiana
