= Linda Gamble =

Linda Gamble may refer to:

- Linda Gamble (model) (born 1939), American model
- Linda Gamble (basketball) (born 1949), American basketball player
