= Grand Cane United Methodist Church =

Historic church in Louisiana, United States

- Grand Cane Methodist Church
- U.S. National Register of Historic Places
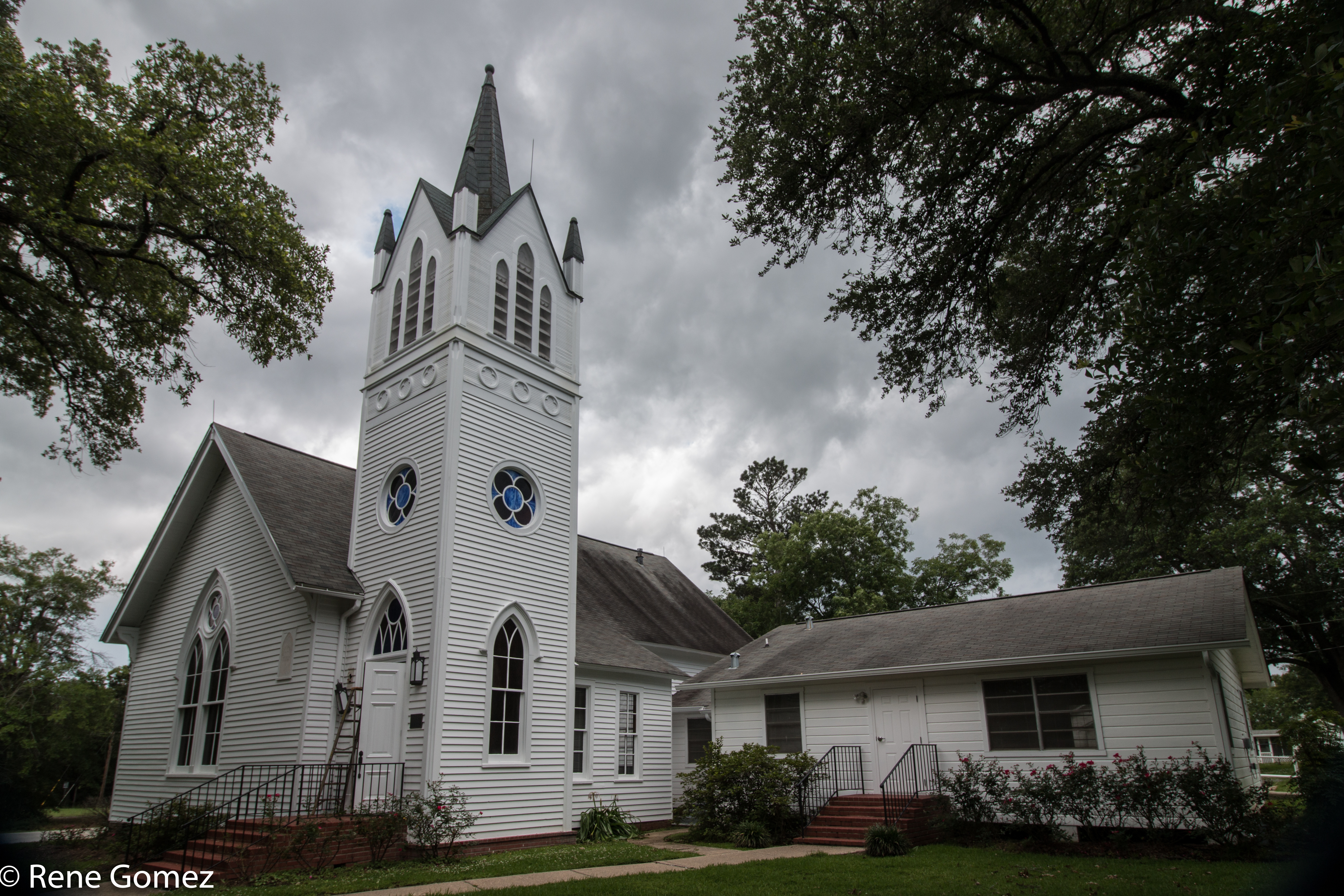

- Location within Louisiana Location within the United States
- Location: 8446 US 171, Grand Cane, Louisiana
- Coordinates: 32°04′54″N 93°48′33″W
- Area: less than one acre
- Built: 1888
- Architectural style: Gothic Revival
- NRHP reference No.: 91002024
- Added to NRHP: January 28, 1992

Grand Cane Methodist Church is a frame Gothic Revival historic church located at 8446 US 171 in Grand Cane, Louisiana. Built in 1888, the church had a three-story tower with an octagonal spire. The tower was modified in 1959, brought to single story and the spire replaced by a pitched roof. In 1990–91, in an effort to restore the original appearance, the tower was replaced with a copy of the previous one, based on photographs.

The church was added to the National Register of Historic Places in 1992.

== See also ==
- National Register of Historic Places listings in DeSoto Parish, Louisiana
