= Caddo Parish Confederate Monument =

Removed monument in Louisiana, US

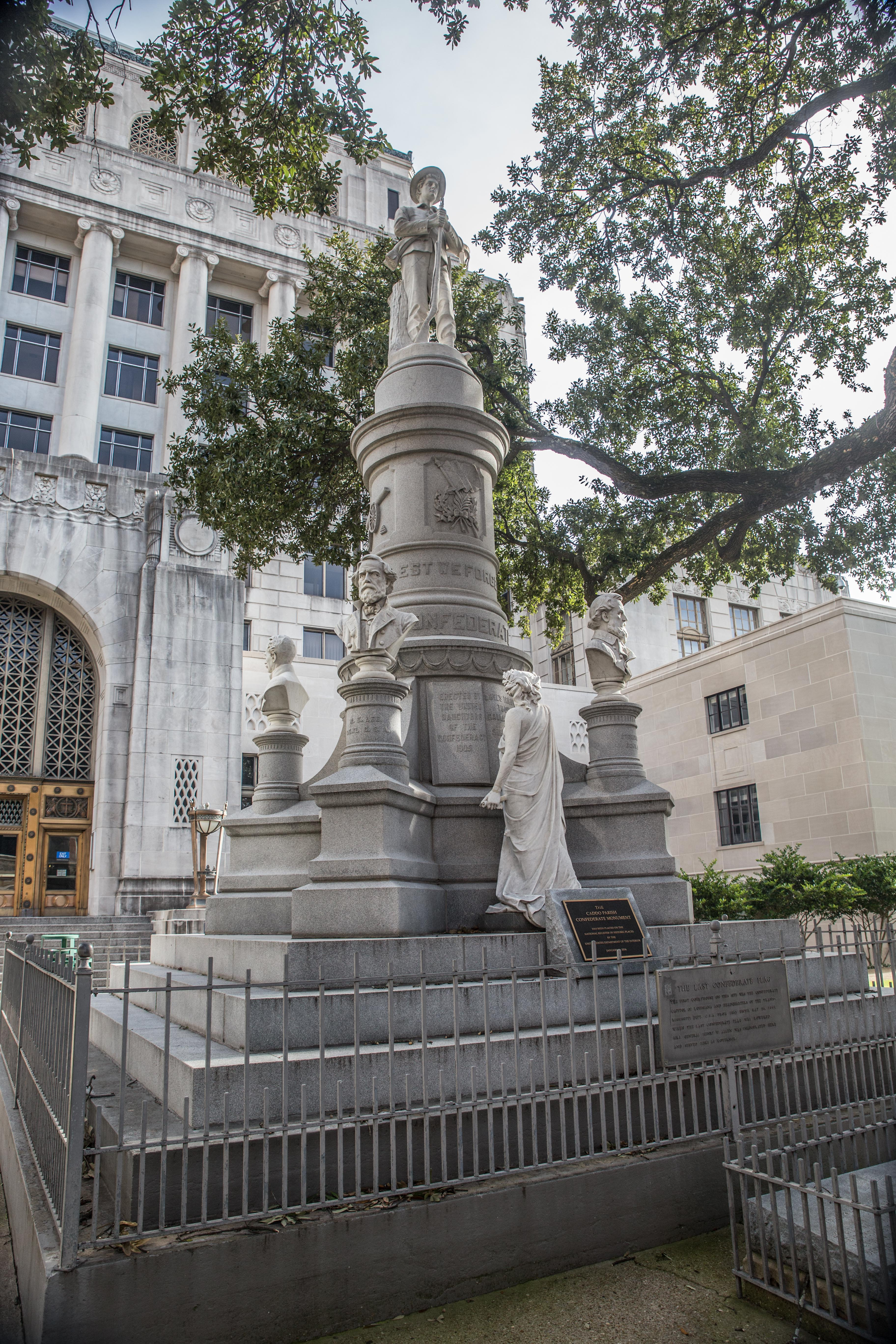
- Monument prior to removal from courthouse
- Interactive map of Caddo Parish Confederate Monument
- Location: De Soto Parish, Louisiana
- Coordinates: 31°51′14″N 93°30′49″W
- Type: Monument
- Height: 30 feet

The Caddo Parish Confederate Monument is a Confederate monument originally located on the grounds of the Caddo Parish Courthouse in Shreveport, Caddo Parish, Louisiana, in the United States. In 2022, it was moved to private land in rural De Soto Parish.

== History ==
The monument was erected in 1905 by the United Daughters of the Confederacy. At the base are the busts of four Confederate generals – Robert E. Lee, P. G. T. Beauregard, Stonewall Jackson and Henry Watkins Allen – and it is topped by a statue of a Confederate soldier. The monument also includes a statue of the Greek mythological figure Clio, who is pointing to the word "Love" on the monument and holds a scroll with the word "History." The Monument was built outside the courthouse for Caddo Parish. The monument was added to the National Register of Historic Places in 2014.

== Move ==
In 2017, the Caddo Parish Commission voted to remove the monument. After the vote, the United Daughters of the Confederacy claimed that the monument was actually built on land given to them so it could not be ordered to be removed by the Parish Commission. The minutes of a 1903 meeting of the Caddo Parish Police Jury, who governed the parish at the time, affirmed that the parish did agree to transfer the land to the United Daughters of the Confederacy. However, no legal paperwork was filed in order to bring effect to this decision.

In August 2019, the commission asked the United Daughters of the Confederacy to remove it within 90 days. In July 2020, with the monument still not removed, the Caddo Parish Commission voted to build a box around the monument. On July 21, 2020, the United Daughters of the Confederacy agreed to allow the parish to move the monument to private land. It was moved to the site of the Battle of Pleasant Hill in rural De Soto Parish in 2022.

== See also ==
- List of Confederate monuments and memorials
- National Register of Historic Places listings in De Soto Parish, Louisiana
