= Roseneath =

Roseneath may refer to:

- Roseneath, an historical misspelling of name of the village of Rosneath, Argyll and Bute, Scotland and from which a number of other place-names derive

== Places ==
=== Africa ===
- Roseneath, KwaZulu-Natal, South Africa

=== Australia ===
- Roseneath, Queensland, in Australia

=== Canada ===
- Roseneath, Ontario, in Canada

=== New Zealand ===
- Roseneath, Wellington, a suburb of Wellington, New Zealand
- Roseneath, Otago, a suburb of Dunedin, New Zealand

=== United States ===
- Roseneath (Gloster, Louisiana), listed on the NRHP in Louisiana

== Other ==
- The Roseneath Terrier, a former name of the West Highland White Terrier
- Roseneath Theatre, a not-for-profit Theatre for Young Audiences (TYA) company which is officed in downtown Toronto but tours its productions to schools grades JK-12 across the province of Ontario
