= North DeSoto High School =

Location
- 2571 U.S. Route 171; Stonewall, (DeSoto Parish), Louisiana 71078; United States; 32.2350°N 93.8290°W

Information
- Type: Public high school
- Established: August 1, 1982; 44 years ago
- School district: DeSoto Parish School Board
- Principal: Joseph Paul Saverino
- Staff: 59.77 (on an FTE basis)
- Enrollment: 828 (2023-2024)
- Student to teacher ratio: 13.85
- Colors: Navy blue, white, red
- Athletics conference: District 1-4A
- Mascot: Griffin
- Nickname: Griffins

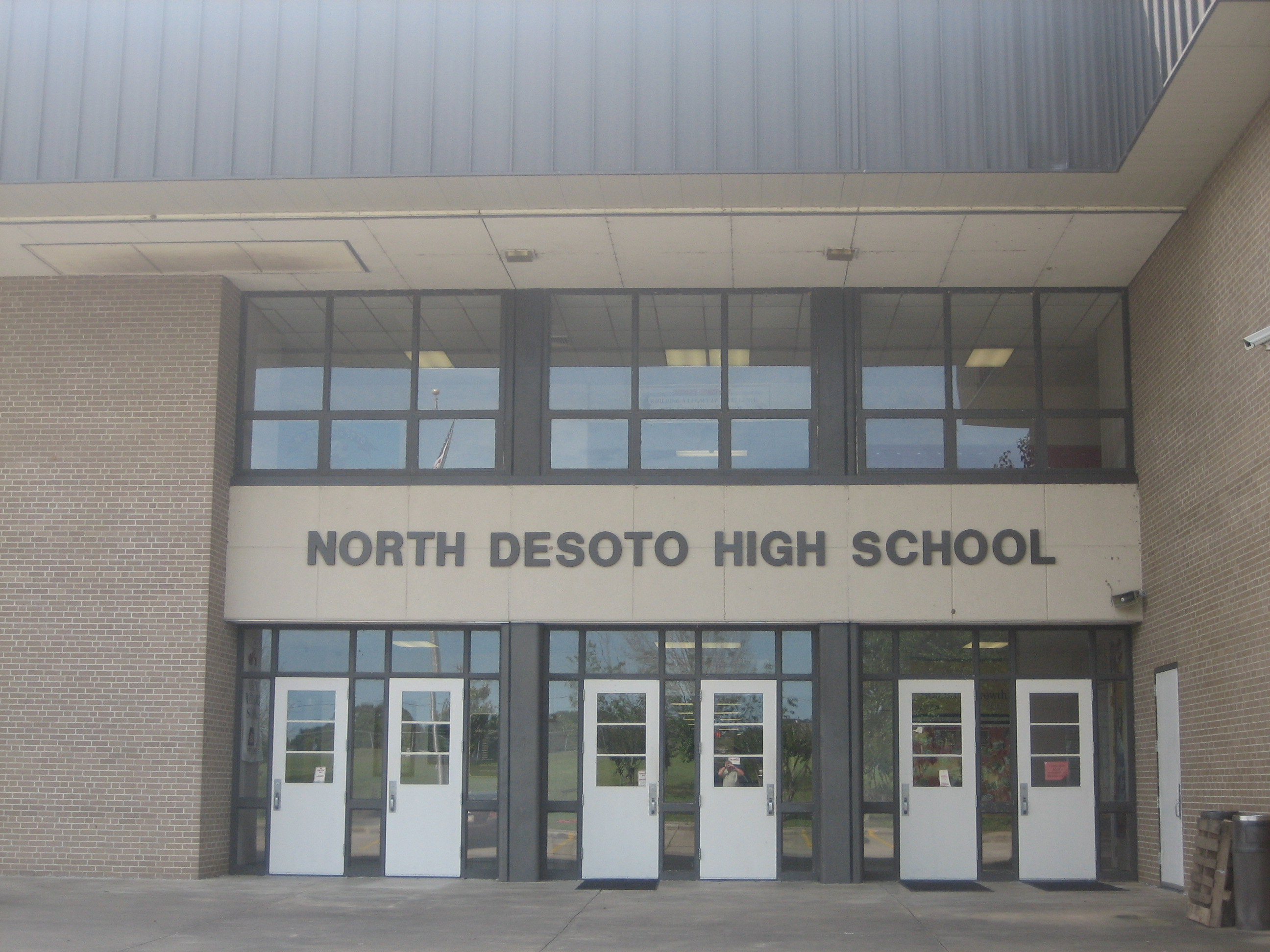
North DeSoto High School entrance

North DeSoto High School is a high school in Stonewall, Louisiana, United States, in DeSoto Parish. It belongs to the DeSoto Parish School Board district.

== Athletics ==
North DeSoto High athletics competes in the LHSAA.
