= Keachi Baptist Church =

Historic church in Louisiana, United States

- U.S. National Register of Historic Places
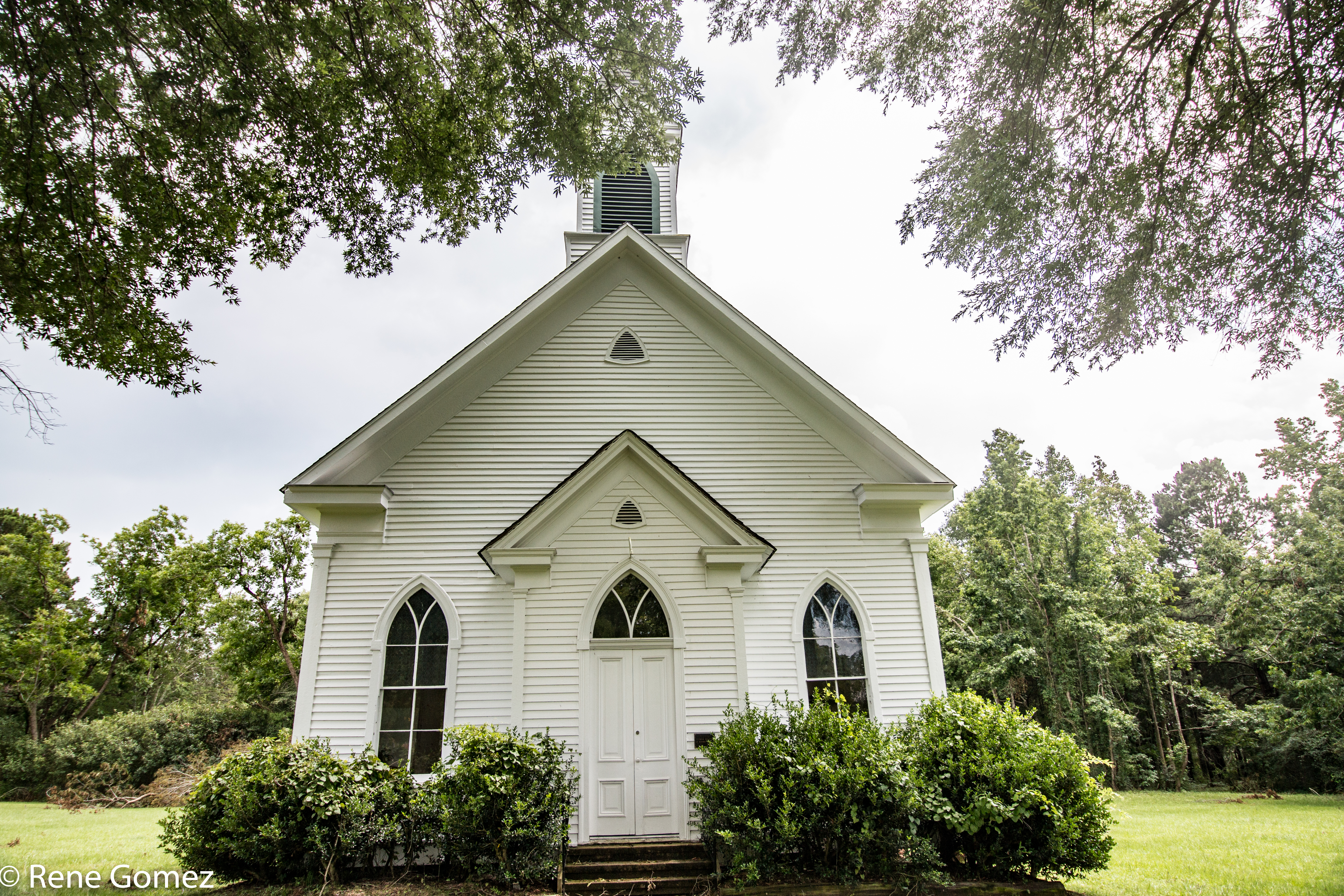
- Church in 2017

- Location within Louisiana Location within the United States
- Location: About 100 yards (91 m) south of LA 172, shortly west of its intersection with Depot Road, Keachi, Louisiana
- Coordinates: 32°11′19″N 93°54′34″W
- Area: 3.6 acres (1.5 ha)
- Built: c.1880
- Architectural style: Greek Revival, Gothic Revival
- NRHP reference No.: 88002039
- Added to NRHP: October 20, 1988

Keachi Baptist Church is a historic Baptist church on Louisiana Highway 172 in Keachi in Desoto Parish, Louisiana. The building was constructed in about 1880 in a transitional architectural style, between late Greek Revival and the Gothic Revival.

It has auditorium-style seats which appear to have been salvaged from the former Keachi Female College, across the roadway.

It is significant as representing the persistence of the Greek Revival style in Desoto Parish well after the Civil War.

The church was added to the National Register of Historic Places in 1988.

== See also ==
- National Register of Historic Places listings in DeSoto Parish, Louisiana
