= John Wiggins (politician) =

American politician

John Wiggins was an African-American politician.

At birth, Wiggins was a slave. He was elected to the Louisiana House of Representatives from De Soto Parish on December 4, 1872, and served as a Republican until his death on January 2, 1874.
