= Allen House (Keachi, Louisiana) =

Historic house in Louisiana, United States

- U.S. National Register of Historic Places
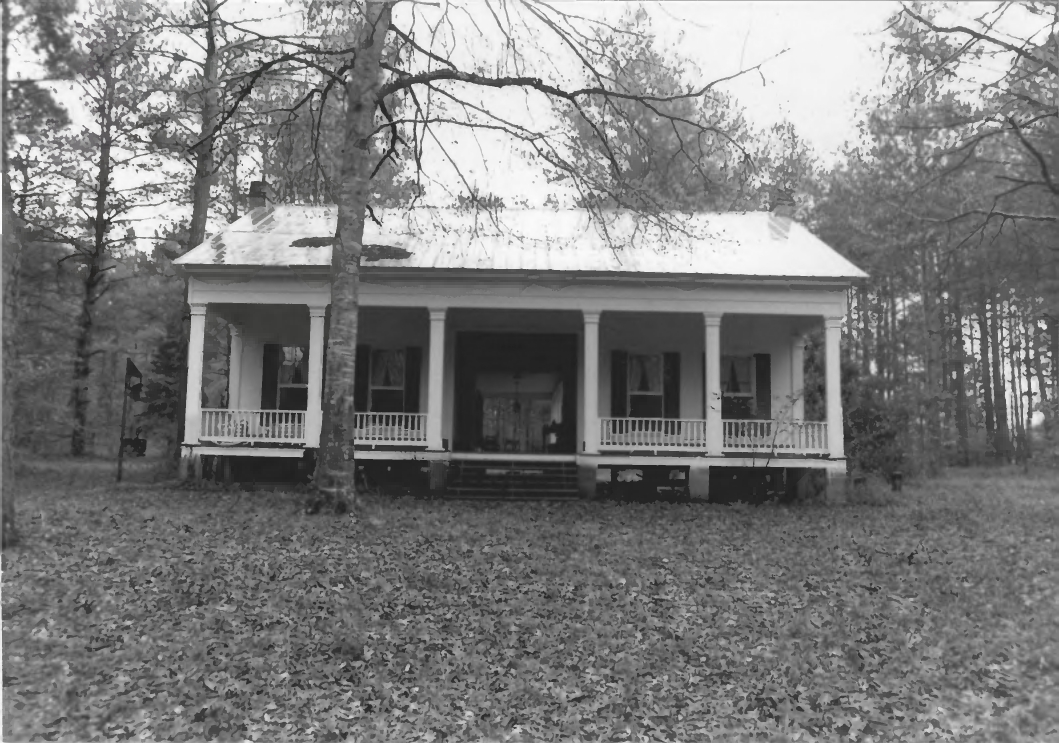

- Location within Louisiana Location within the United States
- Location: About 650 yards (590 m) west of intersection between Smyrna Road and Philips Lane, and about 2.2 miles (3.5 km) southeast of Keachi
- Nearest city: Keachi, Louisiana
- Coordinates: 32°09′35″N 93°53′25″W
- Area: less than one acre
- Built: 1848
- Architectural style: Greek Revival
- NRHP reference No.: 88001154
- Added to NRHP: July 28, 1988

The Allen House located about 2.2 miles (3.5 km) southeast of Keachi in DeSoto Parish, Louisiana, was built in about 1848. It was listed on the National Register of Historic Places on July 28, 1988.

It is unusual as being both a Greek Revival-styled house and a dogtrot house. It was built in Caddo Parish. It was moved in 1969 about 10 miles to its present location.

== See also ==
- National Register of Historic Places listings in DeSoto Parish, Louisiana
