= Guy House (Natchitoches, Louisiana) =

Historic house in Louisiana, United States

- U.S. National Register of Historic Places
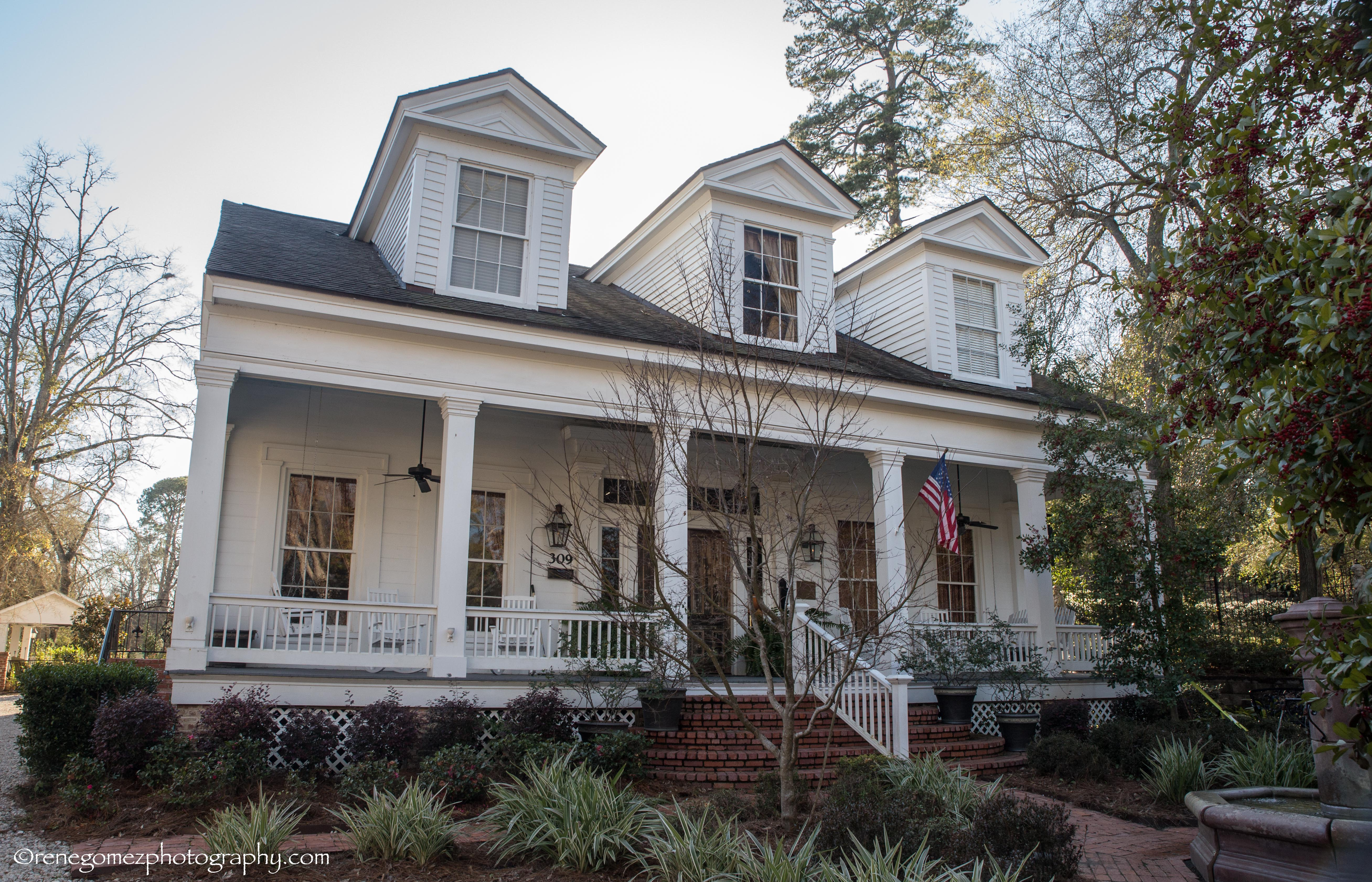

- Location within Louisiana Location within the United States
- Interactive map showing the location of Guy House
- Location: 309 Pine Street, Natchitoches
- Coordinates: 31°45′16″N 93°05′24″W
- Built: c.1850
- Built by: Samuel Eldridge Guy
- Architectural style: Greek Revival
- NRHP reference No.: 88000103
- Added to NRHP: February 11, 1988

Guy House, located at 309 Pine Street, Natchitoches, Louisiana, United States, is a one-and-a-half-story Greek Revival house built in c.1850 by Samuel Eldridge Guy. It was listed on the National Register of Historic Places in 1988.

It is a "galleried cottage", i.e. a small house with a porch (gallery), with vernacular Greek Revival style as interpreted by local builders and carpenters in rural DeSoto Parish.

The front gallery has six Doric posts and end pilasters; there never was a rear gallery. It has chimneys at each of two gable end walls. The house originally had a central hall plan with two rooms on each side.

In 2002 the house was bought and moved from its original location near Mansfield, Louisiana to its actual site at 309 Pine Street, where is now hosting a bed and breakfast.
