= Buena Vista (Stonewall, Louisiana) =

Historic house in Louisiana, United States

- U.S. National Register of Historic Places
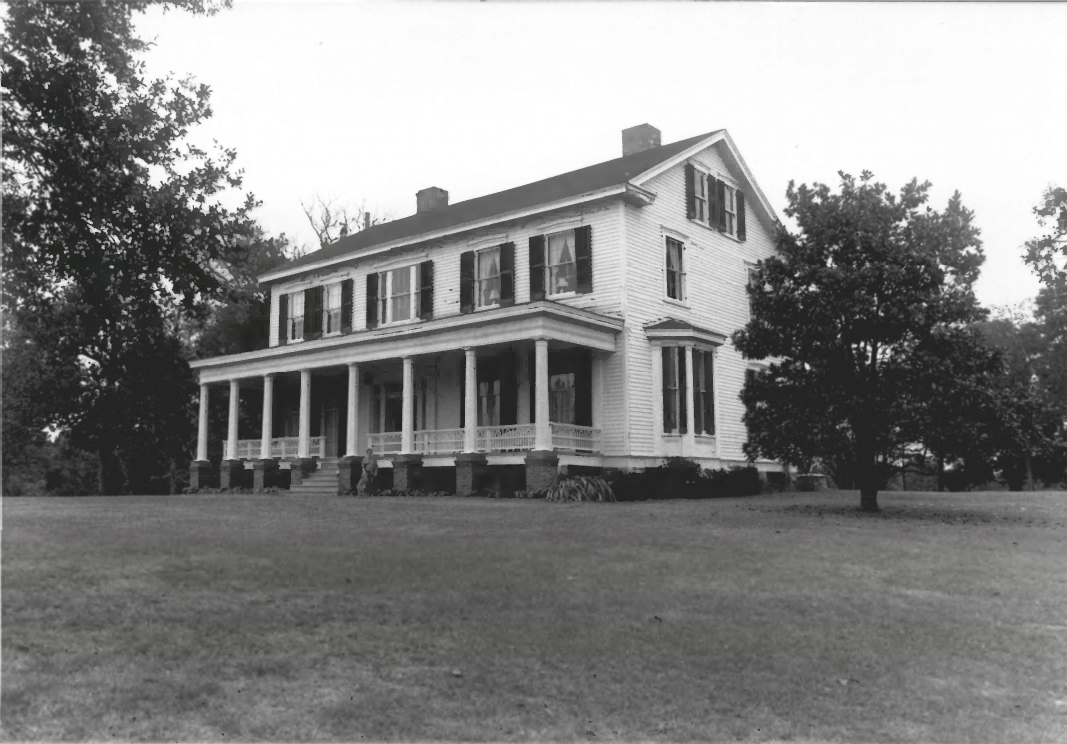

- Location within Louisiana Location within the United States
- Location: On Buena Vista Road, about 550 yards (500 m) from its junction with Red Bluff Road and about 3.8 miles (6.1 km) southeast of Stonewall
- Nearest city: Stonewall, Louisiana
- Coordinates: 32°14′01″N 93°47′37″W
- Area: less than one acre
- Built: 1859
- Built by: M. Robbins
- Architectural style: Greek Revival, Gothic Revival
- NRHP reference No.: 88003197
- Added to NRHP: January 19, 1989

Buena Vista is a plantation with a historic mansion located about 3.8 miles (6.1 km) southeast of Stonewall, Louisiana, U.S.. It was built in 1859 for Boykin Witherspoon by M. Robbins.

The house has been listed on the National Register of Historic Places on January 19, 1989.

== See also ==
- National Register of Historic Places listings in DeSoto Parish, Louisiana
