= The Oaks (Keachi, Louisiana) =

Historic house in Louisiana, United States

- U.S. National Register of Historic Places
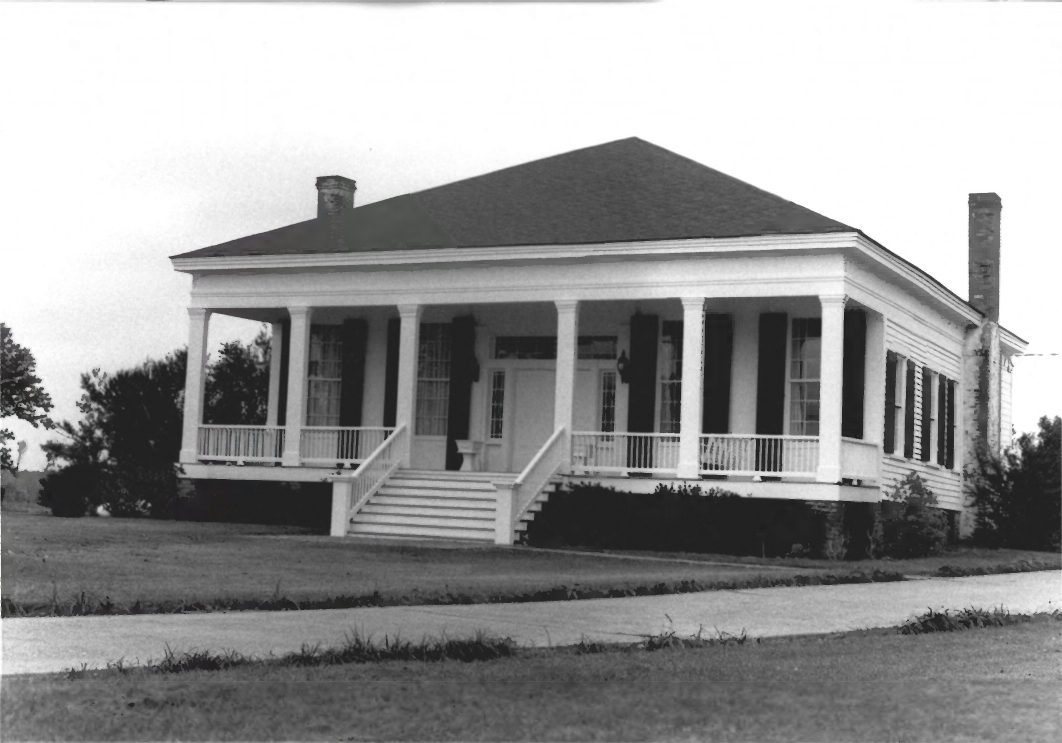

- Location within Louisiana Location within the United States
- Location: Along LA 172, about 2 miles (3.2 km) west of Keachi
- Nearest city: Keachi, Louisiana
- Coordinates: 32°10′59″N 93°56′21″W
- Area: 4 acres (1.6 ha)
- Built: c.1855
- Built by: Henry F. Fullilove
- Architectural style: Greek Revival
- NRHP reference No.: 88003203
- Added to NRHP: January 19, 1989

The Oaks is a historic mansion located along Louisiana Highway 172, about 2 miles (3.2 km) west of Keachi, Louisiana, U.S.. It was built in Greek Revival c.1855 by Henry F. Fullilove. The house was sold to Silas F. Talbert and his wife, Bella Horn Talbert, in 1877 and remained property of Talbert family until c.1960. In 1974 the mansion was purchased by Mr. and Mrs. Donald B. Fisher.

The mansion was listed on the National Register of Historic Places on January 19, 1989.

== See also ==
- National Register of Historic Places listings in DeSoto Parish, Louisiana
