= Roseneath (Gloster, Louisiana) =

Historic house in Louisiana, United States

- U.S. National Register of Historic Places
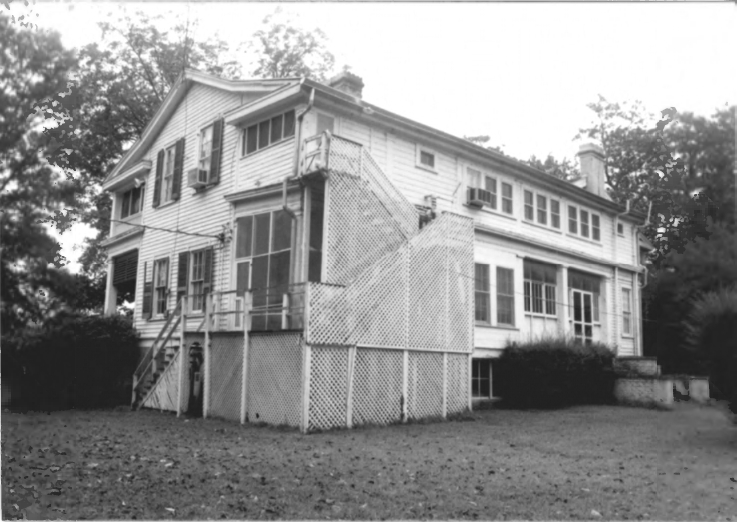

- Location within Louisiana Location within the United States
- Location: 5030 LA 5, about 2.8 miles (4.5 km) southeast of Gloster
- Nearest city: Gloster, Louisiana
- Coordinates: 32°10′35″N 93°46′24″W
- Area: less than one acre
- Built: 1846
- Architectural style: Greek Revival
- NRHP reference No.: 88003137
- Added to NRHP: January 13, 1989

Roseneath is a plantation with a historic mansion located at 5030 LA 5, about 2.8 miles (4.5 km) southeast of Gloster, Louisiana, U.S.. According to family records, it was built in the 1846 for William Bundy Means, and has been occupied continuously by the Means family.

The mansion was listed on the National Register of Historic Places on January 13, 1989.

== See also ==
- National Register of Historic Places listings in DeSoto Parish, Louisiana
