= Keachi, Louisiana =

- Town
- Town of Keachi
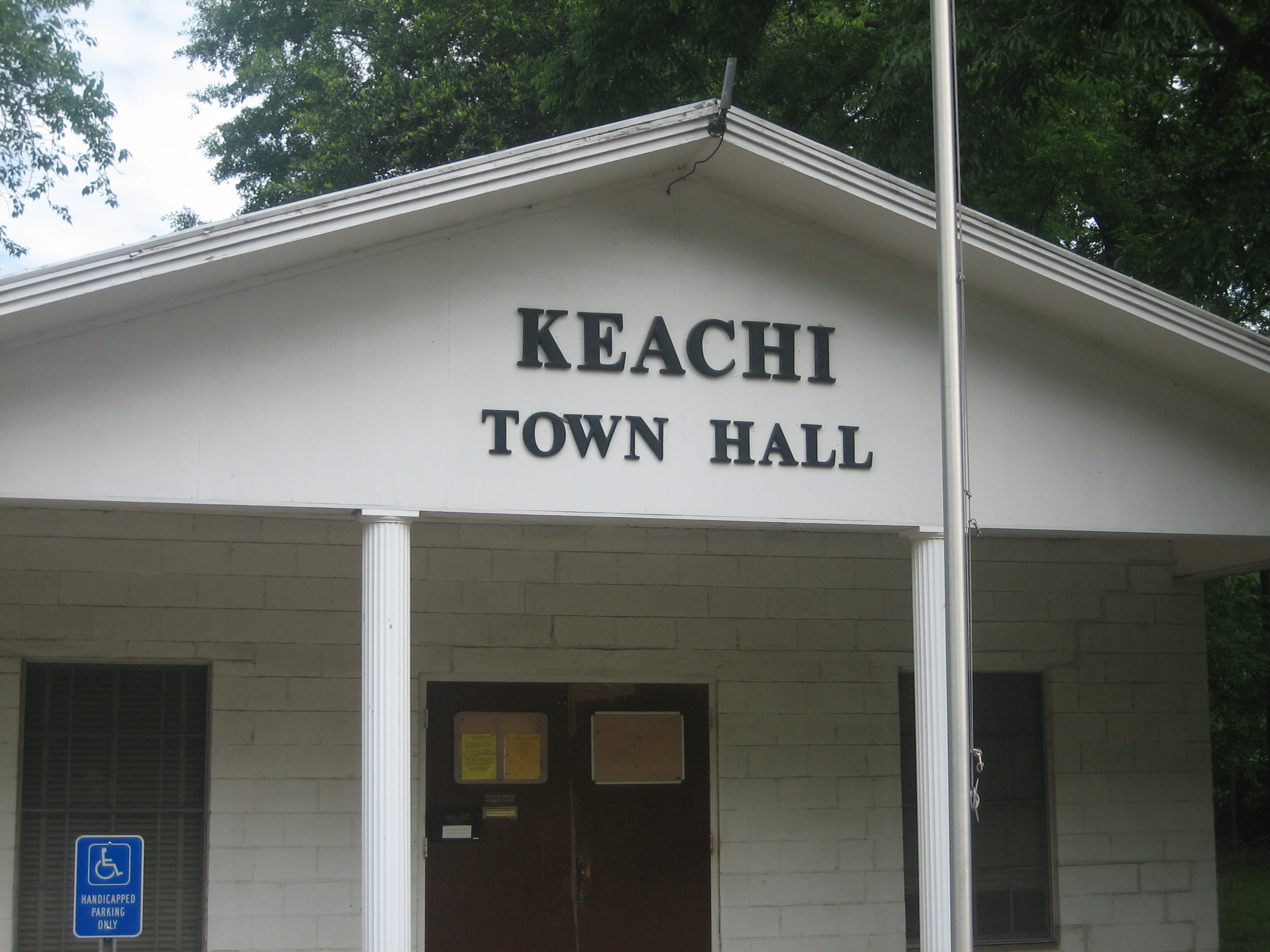
- Keachi Town Hall

- Location of Keachi in DeSoto Parish, Louisiana.

- Location of Louisiana in the United States
- Coordinates: 32°10′15″N 93°54′58″W
- Country: United States
- State: Louisiana
- Parish: DeSoto

Area
  - Total: 5.07 sq mi (13.14 km^{2})
  - Land: 5.03 sq mi (13.03 km^{2})
  - Water: 0.042 sq mi (0.11 km^{2})
- Elevation: 328 ft (100 m)

Population (2020)
  - Total: 243
  - Density: 48.3/sq mi (18.65/km^{2})
- Time zone: UTC-6 (CST)
  - Summer (DST): UTC-5 (CDT)
- ZIP code: 71046
- Area code: 318
- FIPS code: 22-39085
- GNIS feature ID: 2405931

Keachi (pronounced "key-chai"; also spelled Keatchie or Keachie) is a town in DeSoto Parish, Louisiana, United States. As of the 2020 census, Keachi had a population of 243. It is part of the Shreveport–Bossier City Metropolitan Statistical Area.

The Presbyterian Church in Keachi dates to 1848 and is listed on the National Register listings in DeSoto Parish, Louisiana.

== History ==
Keachi features several sites on the National Register of Historic Places, including Allen House, Keachi Baptist Church, Keachi Presbyterian Church, Keachi Store, Keachi United Methodist Church, Liberty Lodge, The Oaks, Prude House, Spell House, Longstreet Rosenwald School, and the Swearingen House. It also includes Keachie College.

== Geography ==
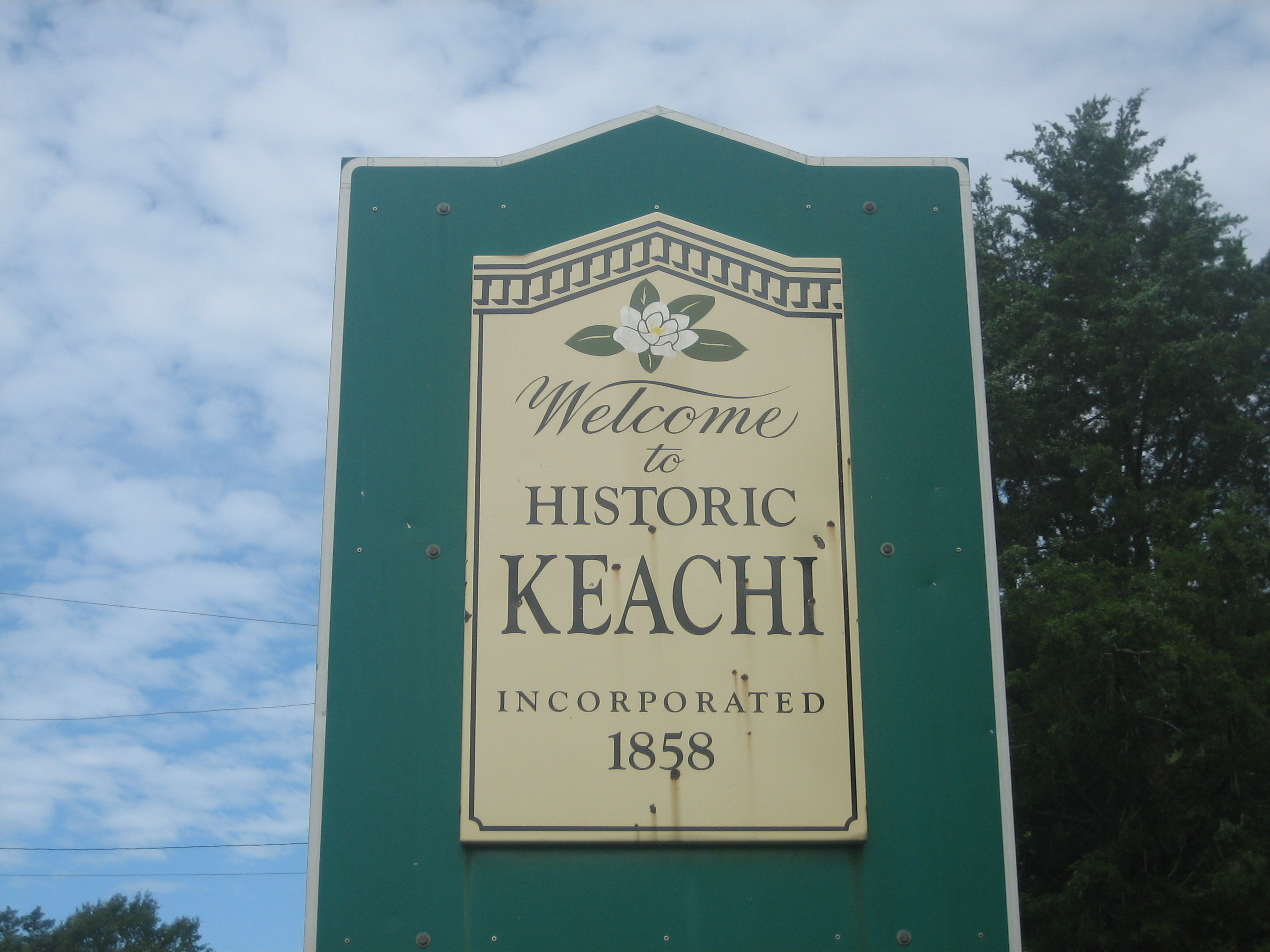
Welcome sign to Historic Keachi

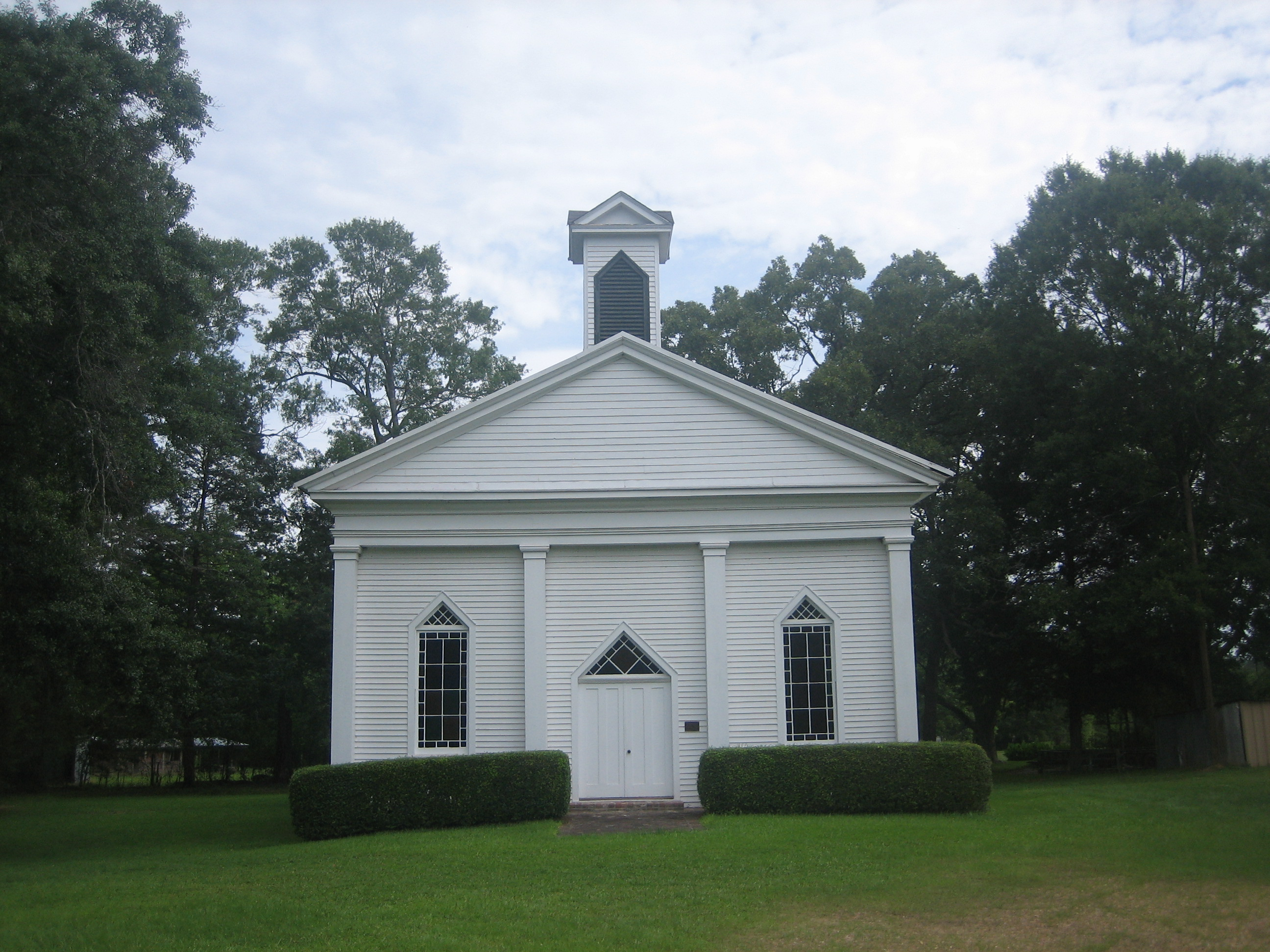
Keachi Presbyterian Church

Keachi is located in northwestern DeSoto Parish. Louisiana Highway 5 passes through the town, leading east 4 miles (6 km) to Kickapoo and south 7 miles (11 km) to Longstreet. Highway 172 leads west 8 miles (13 km) to the Texas border, and Highway 789 leads north 10 miles (16 km) to Spring Ridge. Shreveport is 32 miles (51 km) to the northeast.

According to the United States Census Bureau, Keachi has a total area of 5.1 square miles (13.1 km^{2}), of which 0.04 square miles (0.1 km^{2}), or 0.81%, is water.

== Demographics ==
Historical population
Census	Pop.	Note	%±
1880	316		—
1890	326		3.2%
1960	345		—
1970	328		−4.9%
1980	342		4.3%
1990	277		−19.0%
2000	323		16.6%
2010	295		−8.7%
2020	243		−17.6%
2025 (est.)	246	▲	1.2%
U.S. Decennial Census

As of the census of 2000, there were 323 people, 135 households, and 91 families residing in the town. The population density was 64.4 inhabitants per square mile (24.9/km^{2}). There were 147 housing units at an average density of 29.3 per square mile (11.3/km^{2}). The racial makeup of the town was 65.33% White, 29.41% African American, 2.17% from other races, and 3.10% from two or more races. Hispanic or Latino of any race were 2.79% of the population.

There were 135 households, out of which 31.1% had children under the age of 18 living with them, 56.3% were married couples living together, 8.1% had a female householder with no husband present, and 31.9% were non-families. 29.6% of all households were made up of individuals, and 14.8% had someone living alone who was 65 years of age or older. The average household size was 2.39 and the average family size was 2.96.

In the town, the population was spread out, with 22.3% under the age of 18, 10.5% from 18 to 24, 23.5% from 25 to 44, 26.3% from 45 to 64, and 17.3% who were 65 years of age or older. The median age was 40 years. For every 100 females, there were 90.0 males. For every 100 females age 18 and over, there were 93.1 males.

The median income for a household in the town was $31,071, and the median income for a family was $41,667. Males had a median income of $25,625 versus $20,625 for females. The per capita income for the town was $16,225. About 17.9% of families and 23.4% of the population were below the poverty line, including 38.6% of those under age 18 and 26.2% of those age 65 or over.
