= Pelican, Louisiana =

Unincorporated community in Louisiana, United States

- Unincorporated community
- Location within Louisiana Location within the United States
- Coordinates: 31°52′57″N 93°35′10″W
- Country: United States
- State: Louisiana
- Parish: DeSoto
- Elevation: 322 ft (98 m)

Population
  - Total: around 800
- Time zone: UTC-6 (Central (CST))
  - Summer (DST): UTC-5 (CDT)
- ZIP code: 71063
- Area code: 318
- GNIS feature ID: 538048

Pelican is an unincorporated community in DeSoto Parish, Louisiana, United States. The community is at the junction of Louisiana Highways 483 and 513, 12.6 miles (20.3 km) south-southeast of Mansfield and 30 miles (48 km) north-northwest of Natchitoches. Pelican has a post office with ZIP code 71063. With the population being an estimated 705 people, Pelican is also near an area where a "Civil War reenactment" takes place. Pelican also has forests, which are known as "woods" in this area. Deer hunting is a common activity during deer season. Pelican is around 15 miles from Mansfield, Louisiana via LA 175.
