= DeSoto Parish School Board =

School district in Louisiana, U.S.

Coordinates: 32.0340°N 93.7132°W

DeSoto Parish School Board is a school district headquartered in Mansfield, Louisiana, United States. The current superintendent is Clay Corley.

== Schools ==
=== PK-12 Combination Schools ===
- Pelican All Saints High School (Unincorporated area, closed due to budget cuts)
- Logansport High School (Unincorporated area)
- Stanley High School (Unincorporated area)

=== High schools ===
- Mansfield High School (Mansfield)
- North DeSoto High School (Stonewall)

=== Middle schools ===
- Mansfield Middle School (Grades 5–8) (Mansfield)
- North DeSoto Middle School (Grade 6–8) (Stonewall)

=== Elementary schools ===
- Mansfield Elementary School (Grades PK-4) (Mansfield)
- North DeSoto Lower Elementary School (Grades PK-1) (Stonewall)
- North DeSoto Upper Elementary School (Grades 2–5) (Stonewall)
