= Linda Gamble (basketball) =

American basketball player

Medal record

Women's basketball

Representing United States

Pan American Games
Silver medal – second place	1971 Colombia	Team competition

Linda Gamble (1949) was an American women's basketball player of the 1960s and 1970s, and Pan American Games silver medalist in 1971. She is considered one of the female pioneers in the sport, having helped bring women's basketball international attention.

== Basketball career ==
Gamble was born and raised in Grand Cane, Louisiana, and gained attention for her athletic abilities during high school. She would later, in 1980, be inducted into the Louisiana High School Athletics Hall of Fame. That same year Joe Ferguson was also inducted. She attended college at Ouachita Baptist University, where she played both basketball and tennis, and was named the National College Rookie of the Year in basketball for the 1968-'69 season. Under Head Coach Carolyn Moffit, Gamble led Ouachita Baptist to 48 regular season victories in three seasons, and a fourth place national finish during her freshman season, and third place national finish in 1970. In 2007 she was inducted into the Ouachita Baptist University Athletic Hall of Fame, joining other graduates from that university, to include former Dallas Cowboys star Cliff Harris.

== USA Basketball ==
Gamble went on to play for the USA Pan American team of 1971, in Cali, Colombia, where they finished second to Brazil, winning a silver medal. Although both the Brazil and USA teams finished with a 5–1 record, following Brazil being upset by Canada, Brazil was awarded the gold medal because they had defeated the USA team in the first game of the series. Gamble led the USA team during the games, averaging 20 points per game. They would go on to compete in the 1971 Women's World Championship, held in Brazil, where they finished a disappointing eighth. The success of that team and others brought women's basketball to the attention of the International Olympic Committee, and in 1976 women's basketball was added to the Olympic Games. At that time, she was one of the top women's players in the nation. She has since been named on the "All-Time USA Women's Basketball Team Roster". By the mid-1970s she went into coaching. She would eventually coach for over thirty years, mostly in Texas.
