= Longstreet, Louisiana =

- Village
- Village of Longstreet
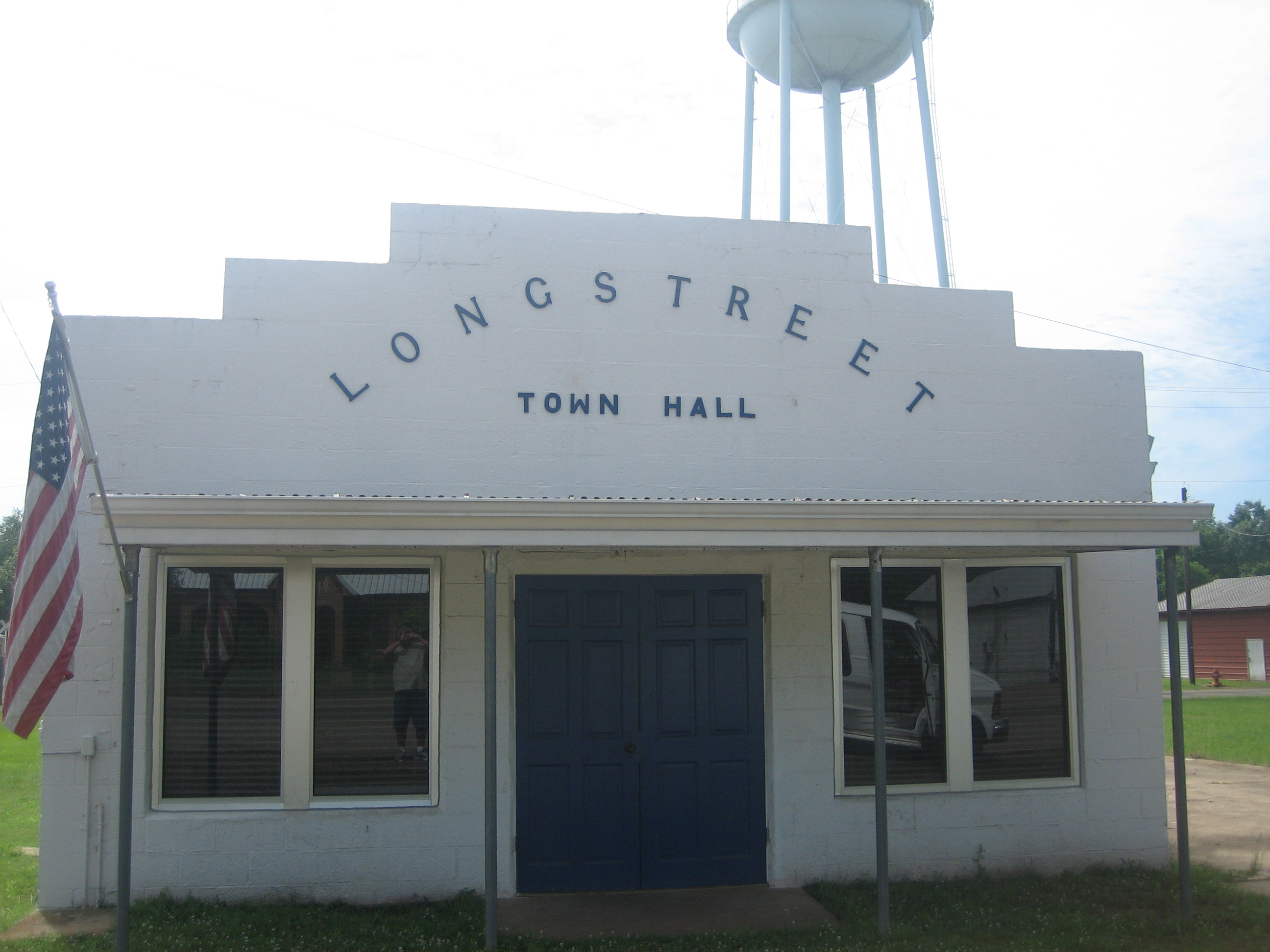
- Longstreet Town Hall

- Location of Longstreet in De Soto Parish, Louisiana.

- Location of Louisiana in the United States
- Coordinates: 32°06′40″N 93°56′55″W
- Country: United States
- State: Louisiana
- Parish: DeSoto

Area
  - Total: 2.07 sq mi (5.37 km^{2})
  - Land: 2.05 sq mi (5.31 km^{2})
  - Water: 0.023 sq mi (0.06 km^{2})
- Elevation: 322 ft (98 m)

Population (2020)
  - Total: 115
  - Density: 56.1/sq mi (21.65/km^{2})
- Time zone: UTC-6 (CST)
  - Summer (DST): UTC-5 (CDT)
- Area code: 318
- FIPS code: 22-45460
- GNIS feature ID: 2407492

Longstreet is a village in DeSoto Parish, Louisiana, United States. As of the 2020 census, Longstreet had a population of 115. It is part of the Shreveport–Bossier City Metropolitan Statistical Area.

Longstreet is named for military officer James Longstreet.

== Geography ==
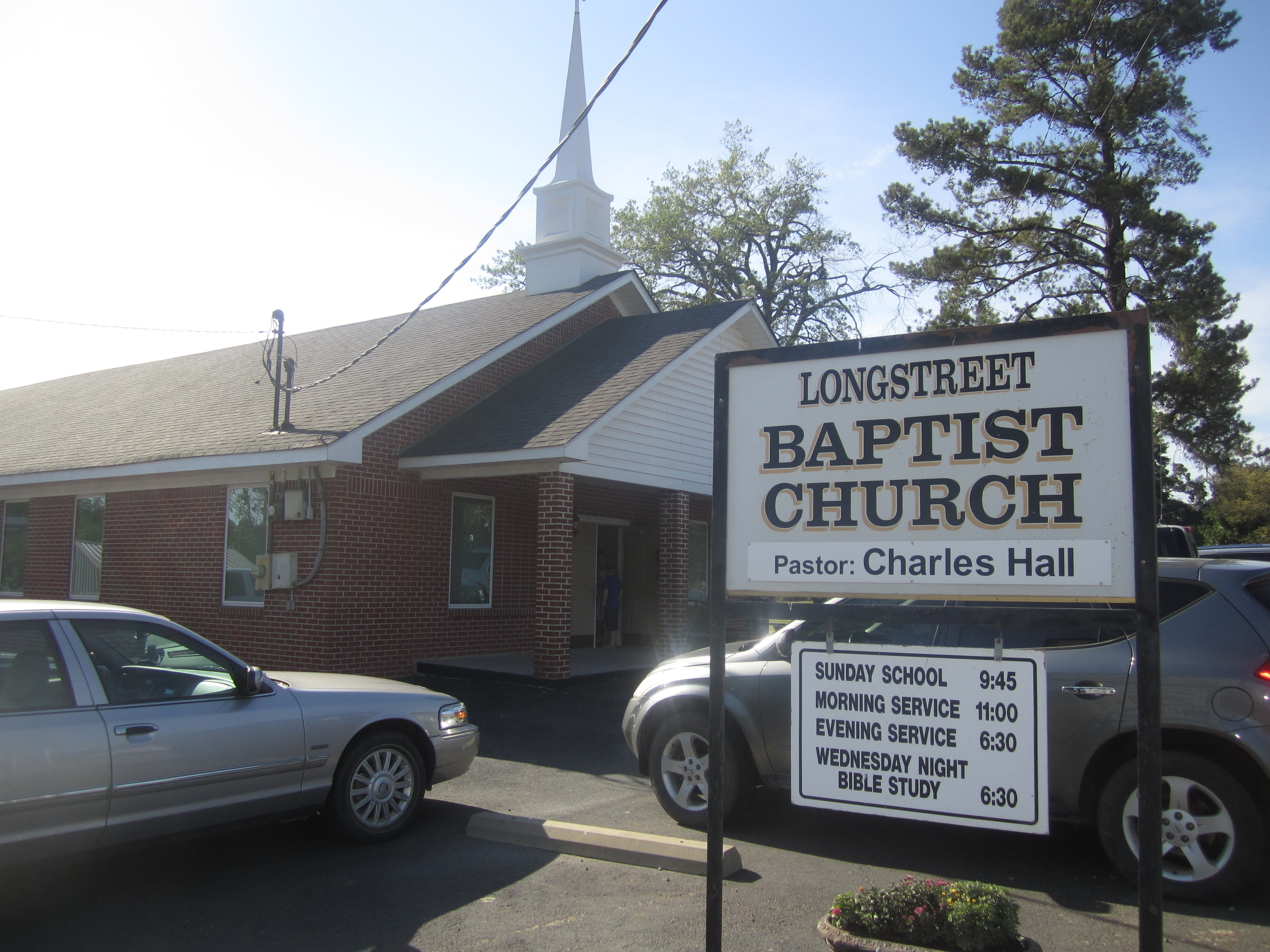
Longstreet Baptist Church

Longstreet is located in western DeSoto Parish. Louisiana Highway 5 passes through the town, leading north 7 miles (11 km) to Keachi and south 9 miles (14 km) to Logansport.

According to the United States Census Bureau, the village of Longstreet has a total area of 2.1 square miles (5.4 km^{2}), of which 0.02 square miles (0.06 km^{2}), or 1.08%, is water.

== Demographics ==
Historical population
Census	Pop.	Note	%±
1920	146		—
1930	308		111.0%
1940	263		−14.6%
1950	224		−14.8%
1960	283		26.3%
1970	182		−35.7%
1980	281		54.4%
1990	189		−32.7%
2000	163		−13.8%
2010	157		−3.7%
2020	115		−26.8%
2025 (est.)	122	▲	6.1%
U.S. Decennial Census

As of the census of 2000, there were 163 people, 70 households, and 45 families residing in the village. The population density was 75.7 inhabitants per square mile (29.2/km^{2}). There were 84 housing units at an average density of 39.0 per square mile (15.1/km^{2}). The racial makeup of the village was 85.28% White, 11.04% African American and 3.68% Native American. Hispanic or Latino of any race were 0.61% of the population.

There were 70 households, out of which 24.3% had children under the age of 18 living with them, 54.3% were married couples living together, 7.1% had a female householder with no husband present, and 35.7% were non-families. 32.9% of all households were made up of individuals, and 21.4% had someone living alone who was 65 years of age or older. The average household size was 2.33 and the average family size was 3.00.

In the village, the population was spread out, with 22.7% under the age of 18, 4.3% from 18 to 24, 26.4% from 25 to 44, 27.0% from 45 to 64, and 19.6% who were 65 years of age or older. The median age was 42 years. For every 100 females, there were 91.8 males. For every 100 females age 18 and over, there were 90.9 males.

The median income for a household in the village was $28,333, and the median income for a family was $51,500. Males had a median income of $31,250 versus $12,344 for females. The per capita income for the village was $15,359. About 12.5% of families and 9.6% of the population were below the poverty line, including none of those under the age of eighteen and 24.2% of those 65 or over.
