= Grand Cane, Louisiana =

- Village
- Village of Grand Cane
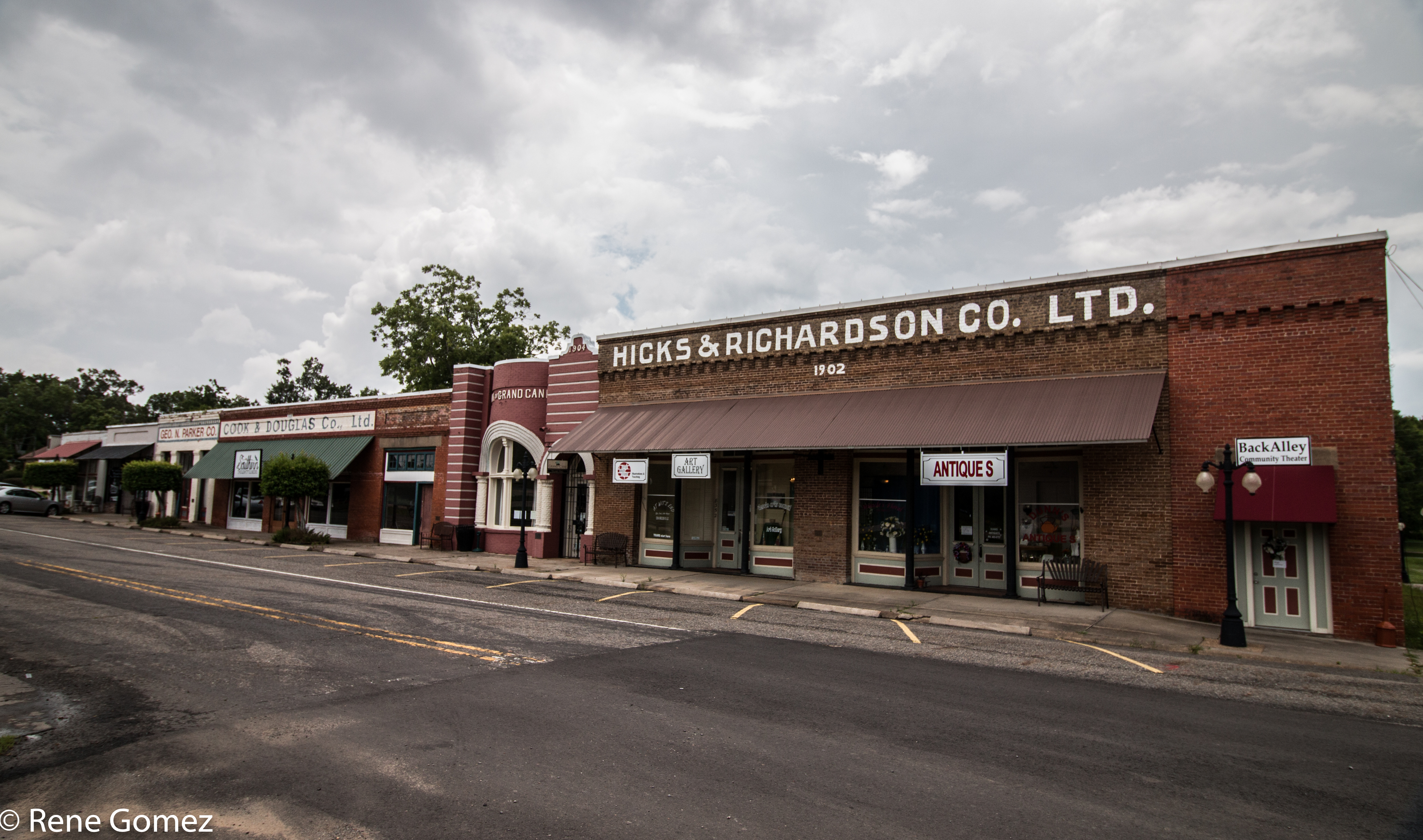
- "Downtown" Grand Cane, Louisiana

- Location of Grand Cane in DeSoto Parish, Louisiana.

- Location of Louisiana in the United States
- Coordinates: 32°05′01″N 93°48′32″W
- Country: United States
- State: Louisiana
- Parish: DeSoto
- Incorporated: 1899

Area
  - Total: 1.15 sq mi (2.99 km^{2})
  - Land: 1.13 sq mi (2.93 km^{2})
  - Water: 0.019 sq mi (0.05 km^{2})
- Elevation: 302 ft (92 m)

Population (2020)
  - Total: 217
  - Density: 191.6/sq mi (73.99/km^{2})
- Time zone: UTC-6 (CST)
  - Summer (DST): UTC-5 (CDT)
- Area code: 318
- FIPS code: 22-30690
- GNIS feature ID: 2407468
- Website: www.villageofgrandcane.com

Grand Cane is a village in DeSoto Parish, Louisiana, United States. As of the 2020 census, Grand Cane had a population of 217. It is part of the Shreveport–Bossier City Metropolitan Statistical Area. It is the hometown of women's basketball pioneer Linda Gamble.

== History ==
Prior to the incorporation of the village of Grand Cane in 1899, the settlement of four families (Thomas Abington, Israel Rogers, Wright Hobgood, and John Wagner) influenced the development of the area around two wagon trails that intersected in the sparsely populated area known as the Grand Cane Territory. In 1881, Amanda Hobgood (widow of Wright Hobgood) deeded land to the New Orleans & Pacific Railway and had the village of Grand Cane laid out in lots and streets. By 1899, the village was incorporated, and the first mayor was E.R. Fortson. The first village councilmen were Paul E. Allen, Loderick Monroe Cook, and Dr. J.B. Johns. The population soon grew to almost 500.

As the village developed, spurred by the railway and the two crossroads (LA Hwys. 171 and 3015), a business community developed which included seven stores, a dentist, bank, post office, blacksmith shop, livery stable, two hotels, four doctors, three drug stores, telephone office, newspaper, restaurant, two cotton gins, and various residential homes. The community was enhanced by the first accredited public high school in Louisiana, and a Presbyterian, Methodist, and two Baptist churches.

The village continued to thrive until the Great Depression of 1929. The downward spiral continued with the demise of the Texas & Pacific Railway in the late 1950s. The steady decline of agricultural industry, the lack of new businesses, the loss of the public school, and a general movement away from the rural area saw the end of the village as a center for trade. Grand Cane, like so many small towns left behind by progress, simply went to sleep until 1993, when the village used funds from a rural development grant from the state of Louisiana to purchase the Hicks & Richardson building.

This action spurred the passage of a preservation ordinance, creating the Grand Cane Preservation Commission, which resulted in the subsequent listing on the National Register of Historic Places of several buildings in the Historic District (Platt, Old Post Office, Cook & Douglas, Hicks & Richardson, & Ricks Bros.). These buildings joined the Village Hall and the Grand Cane Methodist Church that had obtained earlier listings.

=== Present day ===
The Historic District was added to the National Register of Historic Places in 1995, including the Village Hall (Bank of Grand Cane) which gained National Register status earlier in 1988. The Historic District status recognizes the fact that the exterior of the buildings in this short block and a half have remained much the same as when they were built around the turn of the century. Grand Cane is the home of the historic Cook-Hill House Bed and Breakfast. Buildings listed on the National Register include the following:

- The W.W. Platt Dental Office, which was built in 1939.
- The George N. Parker Company building (1910), which was a general merchandise store advertised as "The Shoe and Hat Specialist."
- The Cook & Douglas Building (1903), which was advertised as a general merchandise and plantation supply store; the adjoining side building served as a storage for the Cook & Douglas Building.
- The Bank of Grand Cane Building (circa 1902), which served as a bank until 1970, when the building was donated to the village. It now is the Grand Cane village hall. The first Grand Cane Bank was headed by W.H. Smith. The bank has a very colorful history, and was robbed several times. The building was placed on the National Register of Historic Places on February 11, 1988.
- The Hicks & Richardson Building, circa 1902, which housed an established "General Merchandise and Plantation supplies" store. It featured staples and fancy groceries along with buggies and wagons.
- The Ricks Brothers Building, circa 1915, which later became Gamble Brothers. General merchandise and groceries were sold and delivered to homes.

Today, these buildings house shops, restaurants, the village hall, a community theater and a "mall" of diverse businesses.

In September 2009 the Village of Grand Cane Cultural District was certified by the Louisiana Cultural Districts, Department of Culture, Recreation and Tourism. This initiative has added to the community revitalization with added cultural activity by the DeSoto Arts Council and the establishment of the DeSoto Arts Council Gallery, where original art can be purchased tax free. The DAC Gallery is located in the Hicks-Richardson Building.

== Geography ==
Grand Cane is located in central Desoto Parish. U.S. Route 171 passes through the center of town, leading southeast 7 miles (11 km) to Mansfield, the parish seat, and north 14 miles (23 km) to Stonewall.

According to the United States Census Bureau, the village of Grand Cane has a total area of 1.2 square miles (3.0 km^{2}), of which 0.02 square miles (0.05 km^{2}), or 1.82%, is water.

== Demographics ==
Historical population
Census	Pop.	Note	%±
1890	351		—
1900	385		9.7%
1910	485		26.0%
1920	378		−22.1%
1930	393		4.0%
1940	377		−4.1%
1950	286		−24.1%
1960	322		12.6%
1970	284		−11.8%
1980	252		−11.3%
1990	233		−7.5%
2000	191		−18.0%
2010	242		26.7%
2020	217		−10.3%
2025 (est.)	213	▼	−1.8%
U.S. Decennial Census

As of the census of 2000, there were 191 people, 87 households, and 54 families residing in the village. The population density was 189.9 inhabitants per square mile (73.3/km^{2}). There were 107 housing units at an average density of 106.4 per square mile (41.1/km^{2}). The racial makeup of the village was 55.86% White, 40.99% African American, 2.09% Native American, 0.52% from other races, and 0.52% from two or more races. Hispanic or Latino of any race were 3.14% of the population.

There were 87 households, out of which 32.2% had children under the age of 18 living with them, 46.0% were married couples living together, 13.8% had a female householder with no husband present, and 36.8% were non-families. 32.2% of all households were made up of individuals, and 17.2% had someone living alone who was 65 years of age or older. The average household size was 2.20 and the average family size was 2.82.

In the village, the population was spread out, with 24.1% under the age of 18, 4.7% from 18 to 24, 25.7% from 25 to 44, 24.6% from 45 to 64, and 20.9% who were 65 years of age or older. The median age was 43 years. For every 100 females, there were 85.4 males. For every 100 females age 18 and over, there were 83.5 males.

The median income for a household in the village was $31,429, and the median income for a family was $36,250. Males had a median income of $29,500 versus $23,125 for females. The per capita income for the village was $15,461. About 15.7% of families and 16.4% of the population were below the poverty line, including 17.2% of those under the age of eighteen and 21.6% of those 65 or over.

== Climate ==
The climate in this area is characterized by hot, humid summers and generally mild to cool winters. According to the Köppen Climate Classification system, Grand Cane has a humid subtropical climate, abbreviated "Cfa" on climate maps.

== Notable people ==
- C.L. Bryant (born 1956), African-American Baptist minister and talk show host over KEEL radio.
- Rudy Leopold (1905–1965), Major League Baseball pitcher for Chicago White Sox
- B. H. "Johnny" Rogers (1905–1977), Louisiana state representative 1950-1952 and state senator 1952–1968
