= Stonewall, Louisiana =

- Town
- Town of Stonewall
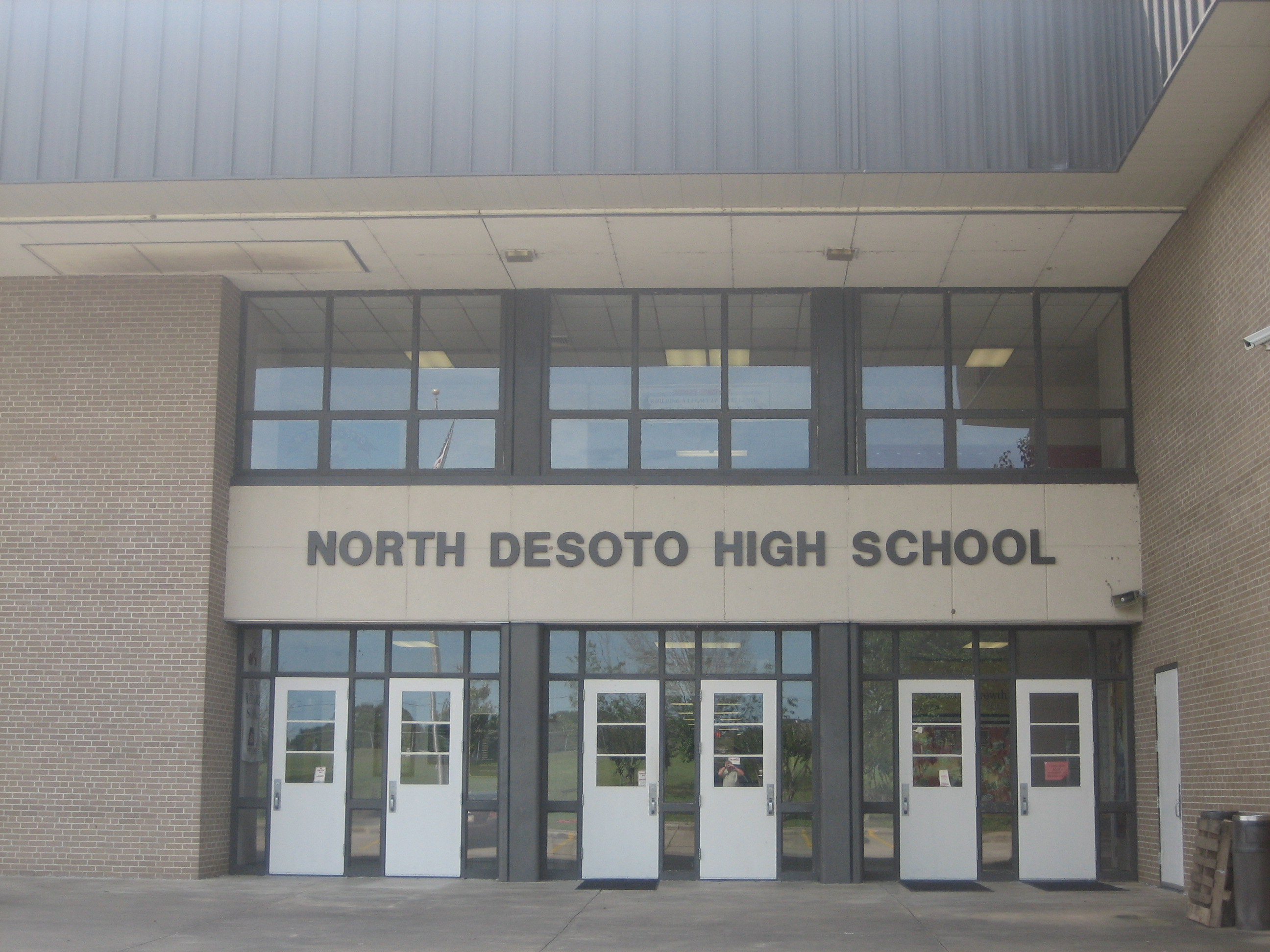
- North DeSoto High School in Stonewall
- Motto: "A great place to live"
- Location of Stonewall in De Soto Parish, Louisiana.
- Coordinates: 32°16′02″N 93°47′25″W
- Country: United States
- States: Louisiana
- Parish: DeSoto
- Founded: Early 1830s
- Incorporated (village): July 12, 1972
- Incorporated (town): Spring of 1974

Area
  - Total: 8.64 sq mi (22.37 km^{2})
  - Land: 8.51 sq mi (22.05 km^{2})
  - Water: 0.12 sq mi (0.32 km^{2})
- Elevation: 272 ft (83 m)

Population (2020)
  - Total: 2,273
  - Density: 267.0/sq mi (103.08/km^{2})
- Time zone: UTC-6 (CST)
  - Summer (DST): UTC-5 (CDT)
- ZIP code: 71078
- Area code: 318
- FIPS code: 22-73395
- GNIS feature ID: 2406670
- Website: www.thetownofstonewall.com

Stonewall is a town in northern DeSoto Parish, Louisiana, United States. The population was 1,814 at the 2010 census, increasing to 2,273 in 2020. It is part of the Shreveport–Bossier City metropolitan statistical area.

North DeSoto High School and the Garland Scout Ranch of the Boy Scouts of America are located in Stonewall.

== History ==
The first settlers came to the Stonewall area in the early 1830s. Colonel Edwards moved his family and possessions from Society Hill, South Carolina to a place they named the Bee Gum Community. This is approximately three miles east of the present Town of Stonewall.

Sometime later, friends of Colonel Edwards moved to the North of DeSoto Parish. Among these were the Witherspoons, Marshalls, Hollembeaks and others. The women came in carriages, the men on horses while their belongings were brought in wagons drawn by oxen and mules. The slaves followed with the livestock.

After building homes and beginning a farmer's life, more provisions were needed. They were ordered from New Orleans and reached Shreveport on the Red River. It took time to get to Shreveport in those days. They went by wagons over the rough, muddy roads or paths, reaching Shreve's Port after a whole day's travel. These trips were not made often.

Soon many families from other communities and states came to make their homes here. Some of the families that have done much toward the building of this community are: Williamson, Powell, Andrews, Loftus, Nicholson, Berry, Gilmer, Lafitte, Hall, and many others.

Black Jack, the first Post Office of the Bee Gum Community, as it was then called, was used in the 1860s. It was located near Welcome Hall, the home of Colonel Edwards. Mail came very irregularly. Later the Star Route Mail came into existence and ran once or twice a week. The route ran from Shreveport to Spring Ridge, Stonewall, Kingston, and on to Mansfield.

In 1862, the community moved its center about three miles west to the site of the new Texas & Pacific Railroad. The community was given its present name when the railroad stop was named after the legendary Civil War General, Stonewall Jackson.

Cotton was king in those days and several sizable plantations ringed the Stonewall area. Some of these were Buena Vista, Allendale, Lands End, and Welcome Hall.

A supplemental industry to cotton had its meager beginning in 1886 when Mrs. J.J. Marshall bought a registered Jersey cow. From this beginning grew a thriving dairy business which blossomed in the early 1900s. By 1943 there were 37 individual dairies in the community of Stonewall.

Stonewall remained a dairy and farming community until the 1960s when people began to realize its proximity to Shreveport, its friendly industries people and its progressive educational system. The town would soon become a bedroom community to Shreveport.

Stonewall is located on a modern four lane highway, Highway 171 in North DeSoto Parish, and only six miles from Shreveport. Interstate 49 is located approximately a mile and a half east of the Stonewall city limits. Highway 171 was first graveled in 1916 and ran from Shreveport to Mansfield. It was built partially by convict labor. The road was paved in the 1930s.

During 1971, a group of Stonewall citizens met and petitioned the Governor to incorporate Stonewall as a village. The town was incorporated July 12, 1972. Mr. Bob Midyett was appointed by the Governor to be the first Mayor of Stonewall. Aldermen were: Bobby Dyson, Gerald Holmes, and Charles Scott. Tax Collector A. L. Bice, Street Commissioner was Curtis McCune Jr., City Marshall was Elmo Smith, Attorney was Charles Scott and Town Clerk was Dudley Glenn. Stonewall was declared a Town by the Governor of Louisiana July 1983.

The first official election was in the spring of 1974. Curtis L. McCune Jr., was elected Mayor and all other elected officials remained the same.

The Town Meetings were first held at the First National Bank building in Stonewall. Later they were moved to the school cafeteria to have more room. In December 1974, the Cox & Hall building was purchased and remodeled for the Town Hall. This was later sold to the DeSoto Parish Library and is presently being used for that purpose. The present Town Hall, located approximately one-fourth mile north of the first Town Hall, was purchased in July 1983. It has served at various times as the Fire Department Office, Voting Polls, Town Hall, and General Meeting Place for the citizens of Stonewall. Part of the Town Hall is being used by the DeSoto Parish Sheriff's Office as a Substation. This Substation is the first of its kind in DeSoto Parish. The Sheriff's Substation opened Tuesday, March 14, 1995.

Stonewall grew from 532 population in 1972 to over 1,000 in 1983. In May 1995, the population was 1,500. 1998's population was 1626 and as of the 2010 census the population was 1,814.

== Geography ==
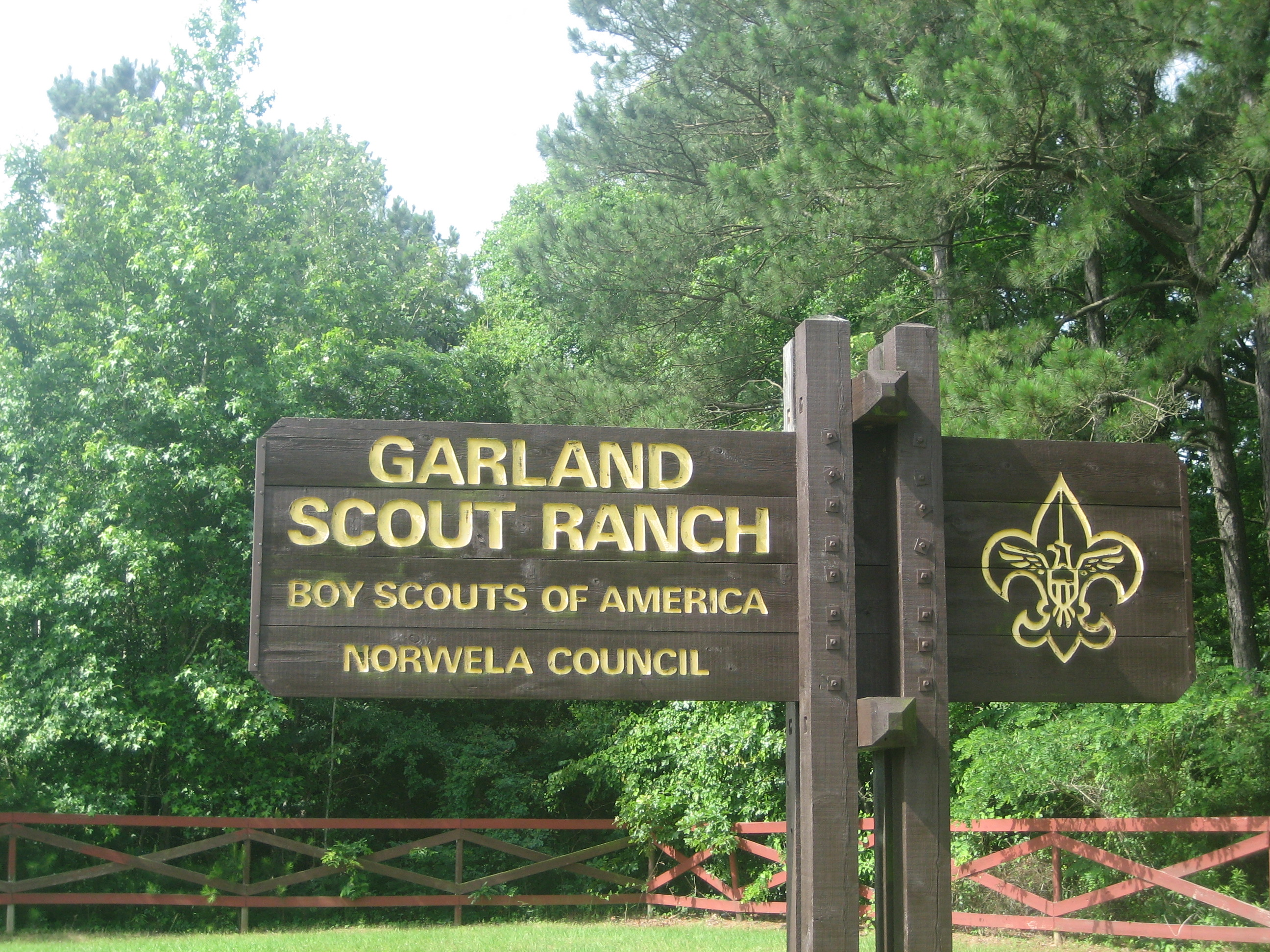
The entrance to Garland Scout Ranch of the Boy Scouts of America is located in Stonewall>

Stonewall is located in northern DeSoto Parish. U.S. Route 171 passes through the town, leading north 19 miles (31 km) to Shreveport and south 22 miles (35 km) to Mansfield, the DeSoto Parish seat. Stonewall-Frierson Road leads east from the center of town 4.5 miles (7.2 km) to Exit 191 on Interstate 49, which leads north to Shreveport and southeast 55 miles (89 km) to the Natchitoches area.

According to the United States Census Bureau, the town of Stonewall has a total area of 7.6 square miles (19.7 km^{2}), of which 7.5 square miles (19.4 km^{2}) is land and 0.1 square miles (0.3 km^{2}), or 1.41%, is water.

== Demographics ==
Historical population
Census	Pop.	Note	%±
1980	1,175		—
1990	1,266		7.7%
2000	1,668		31.8%
2010	1,814		8.8%
2020	2,273		25.3%
2025 (est.)	2,716	▲	19.5%
U.S. Decennial Census

=== 2020 census ===
As of the 2020 census, Stonewall had a population of 2,273. The median age was 41.7 years. 24.2% of residents were under the age of 18 and 19.2% were 65 years of age or older. For every 100 females, there were 88.9 males, and for every 100 females age 18 and over, there were 88.2 males age 18 and over.

There were 881 households, of which 35.6% had children under the age of 18 living in them. Of all households, 55.5% were married-couple households, 14.6% were households with a male householder and no spouse or partner present, and 24.2% were households with a female householder and no spouse or partner present. About 22.1% of all households were made up of individuals, and 11.3% had someone living alone who was 65 years of age or older.

There were 963 housing units, of which 8.5% were vacant. The homeowner vacancy rate was 1.5%, and the rental vacancy rate was 11.0%. 0.0% of residents lived in urban areas, while 100.0% lived in rural areas.

Stonewall racial composition as of 2020
	Number	Percentage
White (non-Hispanic)	1,890	83.15%
Black or African American (non-Hispanic)	146	6.42%
Native American	31	1.36%
Asian	16	0.7%
Other/Mixed	118	5.19%
Hispanic or Latino	72	3.17%

== National register ==
The Buena Vista plantation was add to the National Register of Historic Places in 1989.
