= Kingston, Louisiana =

- Unincorporated community
- Location within the state of Louisiana
- Coordinates: 32°11′04″N 93°42′40″W
- Country: United States
- State: Louisiana
- Parish: DeSoto
- Elevation: 203 ft (62 m)
- Time zone: UTC-6 (Central (CST))
  - Summer (DST): UTC-5 (CDT)
- GNIS feature ID: 541120

Kingston is an unincorporated community in DeSoto Parish, Louisiana, United States. It is located approximately 16 miles south of Shreveport near the intersection of Louisiana highways 5 and 175.

The community is part of the Shreveport–Bossier City Metropolitan Statistical Area.
