= Gloster, Louisiana =

- Census-designated place
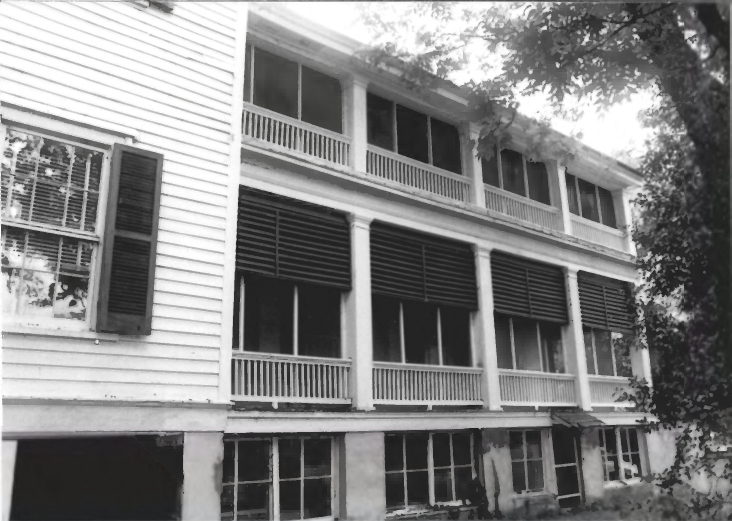
- Rosneath house in Gloster.

- Location in De Soto Parish and the state of Louisiana.
- Coordinates: 32°11′31″N 93°48′41″W
- Country: United States
- State: Louisiana
- Parish: DeSoto

Area
  - Total: 1.27 sq mi (3.30 km^{2})
  - Land: 1.26 sq mi (3.26 km^{2})
  - Water: 0.012 sq mi (0.03 km^{2})
- Elevation: 240 ft (73 m)

Population (2020)
  - Total: 53
  - Density: 42.1/sq mi (16.24/km^{2})
- Time zone: UTC-6 (Central (CST))
  - Summer (DST): UTC-5 (CDT)
- ZIP code: 71030
- FIPS code: 22-29395
- GNIS feature ID: 2586683

Gloster is an unincorporated community and census-designated place (CDP) in DeSoto Parish, Louisiana, United States. As of the 2020 census, Gloster had a population of 53.

Gloster is located 1.5 miles (2.4 km) east of U.S. Route 171, 17 miles (27 km) north of Mansfield, the DeSoto Parish seat, and 30 miles (48 km) south of Shreveport.

It is the nearest community to three places listed on the U.S. National Register of Historic Places:

- Myrtle Hill Plantation House
- Roseneath
- Thomas Scott House

== Demographics ==
Historical population
Census	Pop.	Note	%±
2010	94		—
2020	53		−43.6%
U.S. Decennial Census

Gloster was first listed as a census designated place in the 2010 U.S. census.
