= Louisiana Highway 5 =

State highway in Louisiana, United States

Louisiana Highway 5

- Route of LA 5 highlighted in red

Route information
- Maintained by Louisiana DOTD
- Length: 28.361 mi (45.643 km)
- Existed: 1955 renumbering–present

Major junctions
- Southwest end: US 84 in Logansport
- US 171 in Gloster
- Northeast end: LA 175 in Kingston

Location
- Country: United States
- State: Louisiana
- Parishes: DeSoto

Highway system
- Louisiana State Highway System; Interstate; US; State; Scenic
← LA 4	→ LA 6

Louisiana Highway 5 (LA 5) is a state highway located in DeSoto Parish, Louisiana. It runs 28.36 miles (45.64 km) in a general southwest to northeast direction from U.S. Highway 84 (US 84) in Logansport to LA 175 in Kingston.

An almost entirely rural route, LA 5 is located between the Texas state line and Interstate 49 (I-49) south of Shreveport in the northwest portion of the state. It begins in Logansport as a north–south route and is signed accordingly. In Keatchi, its direction and signage switches to east–west. Shortly afterward, LA 5 crosses US 171 in Gloster.

== Route description ==
From the southwest, LA 5 begins at an intersection with US 84 (Main Street) in Logansport, 0.5 miles (0.80 km) east of the Texas state line at the Sabine River. It proceeds northward out of town parallel to the Union Pacific Railroad (UP) tracks. After passing through a point known as Funston, LA 5 begins to closely follow the rail line into Longstreet. Here it intersects LA 3015, which heads east to Grand Cane on US 171. Continuing northward along the railroad, LA 5 enters Keatchi. At a four-way intersection, LA 172 heads west to the state line, LA 789 heads north toward Spring Ridge, and LA 5 turns to the east. The route's directional banners reflect the change, reading east–west instead of north–south.

After 4.1 miles (6.6 km), LA 5 intersects US 171 at a point known as Kickapoo. US 171 heads north through Stonewall to Shreveport and south through Grand Cane to Mansfield. Shortly after this junction, LA 5 passes through Gloster and curves to the southeast briefly before resuming a general eastward course. 5.5 miles (8.9 km) later, LA 5 terminates at a T-intersection with LA 175 in Kingston. LA 175 connects to a nearby interchange with I-49 (exit 186).

LA 5 is an undivided two-lane highway for its entire length.

== History ==
In the original Louisiana Highway system in use between 1921 and 1955, the modern LA 5 made up the entirety of two routes: State Route 38 from Logansport to Keachi and State Route 748 from there to Kingston.

LA 5 was created with the 1955 Louisiana Highway renumbering, and its route has remained largely the same to the present day. Three zigzags in the route were eliminated near the junction with US 171. At Kickapoo, LA 5 originally turned south briefly onto US 171 and then east onto Gloster Road, now a local road, before rejoining the present alignment shortly afterward. A new connector was constructed to continue straight across US 171 and curve to meet the original alignment. Immediately to the east in Gloster, LA 5 made a jog to the south and back to the east at the location of a former railroad crossing near Main Street. It rejoined the present alignment directly opposite Jessie Latin Road, turning to the southeast. The construction of a wide curve at this location has replaced both jogs in the route.

More recently, the eastern end of the route was slightly truncated. It formerly made a zigzag across LA 175 to a point on the Kansas City Southern Railway (KCS) line known as Kingston Station, continuing from there as a local road, Mt. Zion Road. This portion of LA 5 was transferred to local control in 2016 as part of the La DOTD's Road Transfer Program.

== Major intersections ==
The entire highway is in DeSoto Parish.

Location	mi	km	Destinations	Notes
Logansport	0.000	0.000	US 84 (Main Street) – Mansfield, Tenaha	Southern terminus
Longstreet	8.887	14.302	LA 3015 west	Southern end of LA 3015 concurrency
Longstreet	8.915	14.347	LA 3015 east – Grand Cane	Northern end of LA 3015 concurrency
Keachi	15.792	25.415	LA 172 west LA 789 north	Eastern terminus of LA 172; southern terminus of LA 789; to Northwest Louisiana Veterans Cemetery
Gloster	19.848– 19.896	31.942– 32.020	US 171 – Mansfield, Shreveport	Location also known as Kickapoo
Kingston	28.361	45.643	LA 175 to I-49 – Mansfield, Shreveport	Eastern terminus
1.000 mi = 1.609 km; 1.000 km = 0.621 mi: Concurrency terminus
