= DeSoto Parish, Louisiana =

Parish in Louisiana, United States

Coordinates: 32.06°N 93.74°W

- Parish
- Parish of DeSoto; Paroisse de DeSoto (French); Parroquia de DeSoto (Spanish)
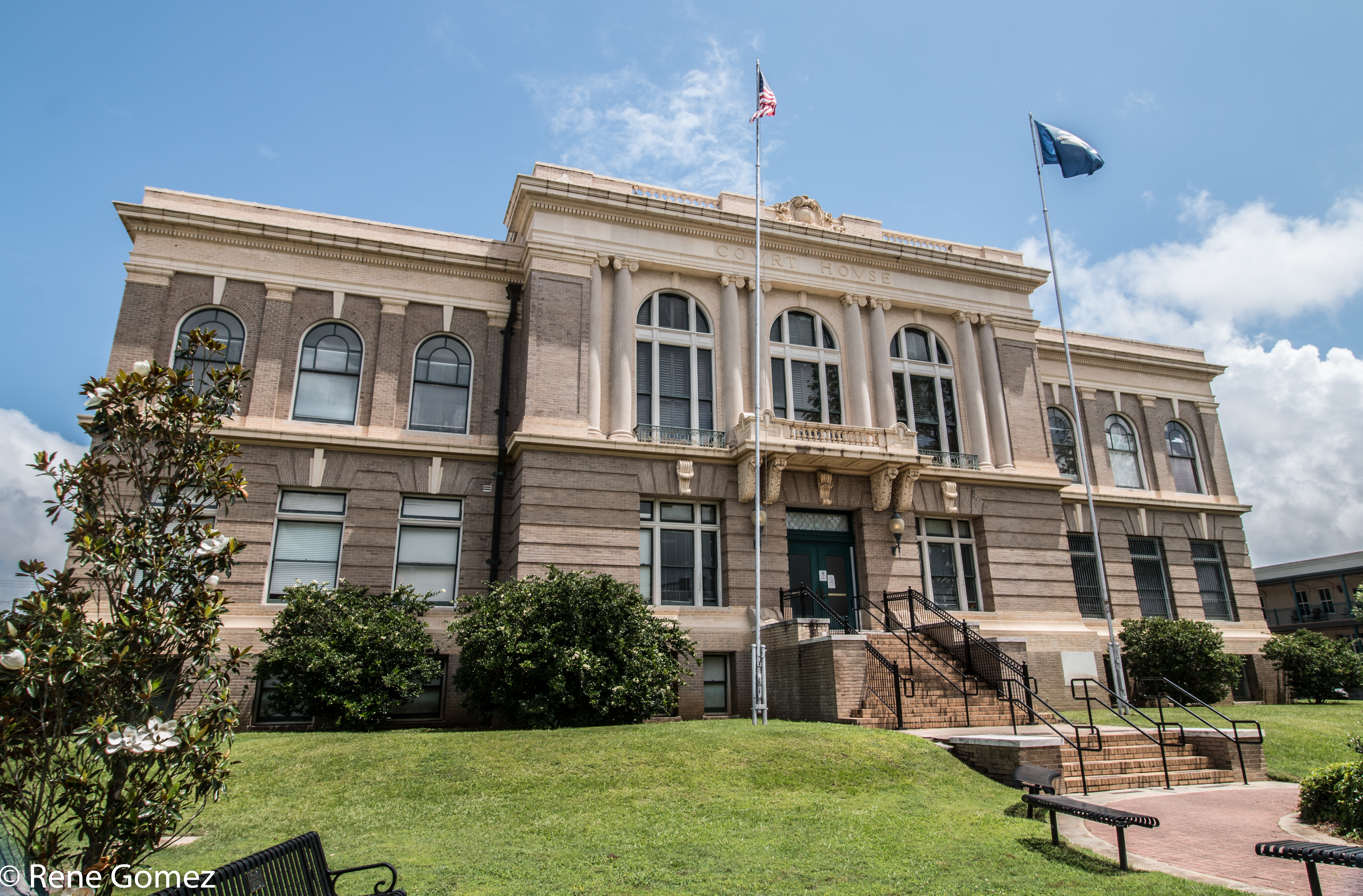
- DeSoto Parish Courthouse in Mansfield

- Flag

- Location within the U.S. state of Louisiana

- Louisiana's location within the U.S.
- Country: United States
- State: Louisiana
- Region: North Louisiana
- Founded: 1843
- Named for: settler, Marcel DeSoto
- Parish seat: Mansfield
- Largest municipality: Stonewall (area); Mansfield (population)

Area
  - Total: 895 sq mi (2,320 km^{2})
  - Land: 876 sq mi (2,270 km^{2})
  - Water: 19 sq mi (49 km^{2})
  - percentage: 2.1 sq mi (5.4 km^{2})

Population (2020)
  - Total: 26,812
  - Estimate (2025): 27,381 ▲
  - Density: 30.6/sq mi (11.8/km^{2})
- Time zone: UTC-6 (CST)
  - Summer (DST): UTC-5 (CDT)
- Area code: 318
- Congressional district: 4th
- Website: DeSoto Parish Government

DeSoto Parish (Spanish: Parroquia de DeSoto; French: Paroisse DeSoto) is a parish located in the U.S. state of Louisiana. The parish was formed in 1843. At the 2020 U.S. census, the population was 26,812. Its parish seat and most populous municipality is Mansfield. DeSoto Parish is part of the Shreveport–Bossier City metropolitan statistical area.

== History ==
It is a typical misconception that the parish was named after Hernando de Soto, the Spaniard who explored the future southeastern United States and discovered and named the Mississippi River. The parish was in fact named after the unrelated Marcel DeSoto, who led the first group of European settlers there, to a settlement historically known as Bayou Pierre. The parish's name is also commonly misspelled following the explorer's name as "De Soto Parish," but it is properly spelled following the settler's name as "DeSoto Parish."

== Geography ==
According to the U.S. Census Bureau, the parish has a total area of 895 square miles (2,320 km^{2}), of which 876 square miles (2,270 km^{2}) is land and 19 square miles (49 km^{2}) (2.1%) is water.

=== Major highways ===
- Interstate 49
- Future Interstate 69
- U.S. Highway 84
  - US 84 Bus.
- U.S. Highway 171
- U.S. Highway 371
- Louisiana Highway 5
- Louisiana Highway 169
- Louisiana Highway 172
- Louisiana Highway 174
- Louisiana Highway 175
- Louisiana Highway 177
- Louisiana Highway 191
- Louisiana Highway 346
- Louisiana Highway 481
- Louisiana Highway 483
- Louisiana Highway 509
- Louisiana Highway 510
- Louisiana Highway 512
- Louisiana Highway 513
- Louisiana Highway 522
- Louisiana Highway 763
- Louisiana Highway 764
- Louisiana Highway 765
- Louisiana Highway 789
- Louisiana Highway 3015
- Louisiana Highway 3248
- Louisiana Highway 3276

=== Adjacent parishes ===
- Caddo Parish (north)
- Red River Parish (east)
- Natchitoches Parish (southeast)
- Sabine Parish (south)
- Shelby County, Texas (southwest)
- Panola County, Texas (west)

=== National protected area ===
- Red River National Wildlife Refuge (part)

== Communities ==
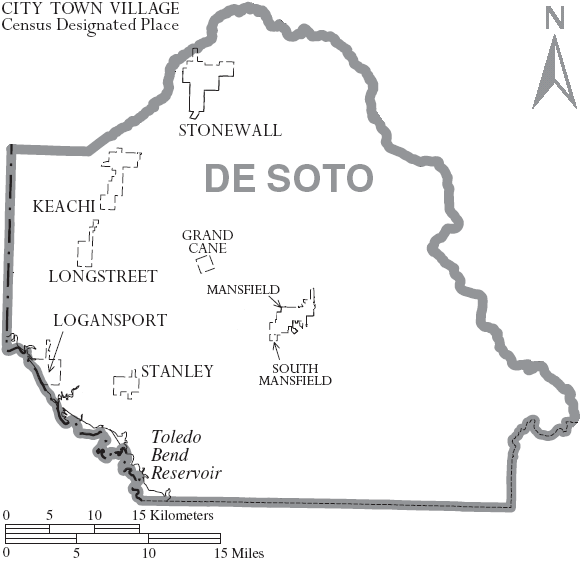
Map of DeSoto Parish, with municipal labels

=== City ===
- Mansfield (parish seat and largest municipality)

=== Towns ===
- Keachi
- Logansport
- Stonewall

=== Villages ===
- Grand Cane
- Longstreet
- South Mansfield
- Stanley

=== Unincorporated areas ===
==== Census-designated places ====
- Frierson
- Gloster

==== Unincorporated communities ====
- Benson
- Carmel
- Evelyn
- Funston
- Hunter
- Kingston
- Naborton
- Pelican

=== Former communities ===
- Oxford

== Demographics ==
Historical population
| Census | Pop. | Note | %± |
|---|---|---|---|
| 1850 | 8,023 | | — |
| 1860 | 13,298 | | 65.7% |
| 1870 | 14,962 | | 12.5% |
| 1880 | 15,603 | | 4.3% |
| 1890 | 19,860 | | 27.3% |
| 1900 | 25,063 | | 26.2% |
| 1910 | 27,689 | | 10.5% |
| 1920 | 29,376 | | 6.1% |
| 1930 | 31,016 | | 5.6% |
| 1940 | 31,803 | | 2.5% |
| 1950 | 24,398 | | −23.3% |
| 1960 | 24,248 | | −0.6% |
| 1970 | 22,764 | | −6.1% |
| 1980 | 25,727 | | 13.0% |
| 1990 | 25,346 | | −1.5% |
| 2000 | 25,494 | | 0.6% |
| 2010 | 26,656 | | 4.6% |
| 2020 | 26,812 | | 0.6% |
| 2025 (est.) | 27,381 | ▲ | 2.1% |
U.S. Decennial Census; 1790-1960 1900-1990; 1990-2000 2010

DeSoto Parish racial composition as of 2020
| Race | Number | Percentage |
|---|---|---|
| White (non-Hispanic) | 15,122 | 56.4% |
| Black or African American (non-Hispanic) | 9,586 | 35.75% |
| Native American | 242 | 0.9% |
| Asian | 99 | 0.37% |
| Pacific Islander | 12 | 0.05% |
| Other/Mixed | 1,001 | 3.73% |
| Hispanic or Latino | 762 | 2.84% |

As of the 2020 United States census, there were 26,812 people, 10,821 households, and 7,254 families residing in the parish. At the 2019 American Community Survey, there were 10,821 households.

In 2019, the racial and ethnic makeup of the parish was 58.8% non-Hispanic or Latino white, 35.3% Black or African American, 0.9% American Indian and Alaska Native, 0.1% Asian, <0.0% Native Hawaiian and other Pacific Islander, 0.1% some other race, 1.9% two or more races, and 2.9% Hispanic or Latin American of any race.

There were 10,821 households at the 2019 census estimates, and the home-ownership rate was 71.3%. Of the 7,716 owner-occupied units, 3,917 were married couples living together, 365 male households with no female present, and 896 female households with no male present. There was a 17.1% vacancy rate in the parish. The average family size was 3.07, and the average household size was 2.50.

In the parish, 75.5% were aged 18 and older, and 17.2% were aged 65 and older; the median age was 39.3, and 6.5% were aged 5 and under. Approximately 0.8% of the population were foreign-born, and 2.1% spoke a language other than English at home.

The median income for a household in the parish was $46,006; families had a median income of $56,323, married couples had a median income of $78,090, and non-family households had a median income of $25,314. An estimated 22% of the parish lived at or below the poverty line, and 30.6% of people aged under 18 were at or below the poverty line.

== Education ==
Public schools in DeSoto Parish are operated by the DeSoto Parish School Board. It is in the service area of Bossier Parish Community College.

== Notable people ==
- Larry Bagley (born 1949), incoming Republican member of the Louisiana House of Representatives for Caddo, Desoto, and Sabine parishes
- Terry Bradshaw (born 1948), Hall of Fame professional football player, sportscaster, singer, and actor
- Vida Blue (born 1949–2023), professional baseball player
- C.L. Bryant (born 1956), Baptist minister and radio talk show host
- Riemer Calhoun (1909–1994), state senator from 1944 to 1952 for DeSoto and Caddo parishes
- Joe T. Cawthorn (1911–1967), state senator from 1940 to 1944 for DeSoto and Caddo parishes
- Kenny Ray Cox (born 1957), Louisiana state representative and former United States Army officer
- Milton Joseph Cunningham (1842–1916), Natchitoches and New Orleans lawyer, state senator from Natchitoches and DeSoto parishes from 1880 to 1884; state attorney general for three nonconsecutive terms ending in 1900, born in what became DeSoto Parish
- George Dement (1922–2014), mayor of Bossier City
- Joseph Barton Elam (1821–1885), United States Representative from Louisiana's 4th congressional district
- William Pike Hall Sr. (1896–1945), state senator for Caddo and DeSoto parishes, 1924–1932, Shreveport attorney
- John Spencer Hardy (1913–2012), United States Air Force lieutenant general
- Albert Lewis (1960-), professional football player
- Garnie W. McGinty (1900–1984), historian at Louisiana Tech University and school principal
- Mack Charles Reynolds (1935–1991), professional football player
- B. H. "Johnny" Rogers (1905–1977), politician
- C. O. Simpkins, Sr. (1925–2019 from Mansfield), African-American state representative, dentist, and civil rights activist in Shreveport
- O.C. Smith (1932–2001), singer

== Politics ==
United States presidential election results for DeSoto Parish, Louisiana
| Year | Republican | | Democratic | | Third party(ies) | |
| Year | No. | % | No. | % | No. | % |
|---|---|---|---|---|---|---|
| 1912 | 11 | 1.20% | 815 | 88.68% | 93 | 10.12% |
| 1916 | 17 | 1.52% | 1,104 | 98.48% | 0 | 0.00% |
| 1920 | 56 | 4.39% | 1,219 | 95.61% | 0 | 0.00% |
| 1924 | 118 | 9.25% | 1,146 | 89.88% | 11 | 0.86% |
| 1928 | 517 | 26.32% | 1,445 | 73.57% | 2 | 0.10% |
| 1932 | 87 | 3.47% | 2,416 | 96.45% | 2 | 0.08% |
| 1936 | 93 | 3.83% | 2,337 | 96.17% | 0 | 0.00% |
| 1940 | 211 | 6.84% | 2,872 | 93.16% | 0 | 0.00% |
| 1944 | 538 | 22.45% | 1,858 | 77.55% | 0 | 0.00% |
| 1948 | 270 | 9.72% | 617 | 22.21% | 1,891 | 68.07% |
| 1952 | 2,303 | 57.85% | 1,678 | 42.15% | 0 | 0.00% |
| 1956 | 2,011 | 53.33% | 1,206 | 31.98% | 554 | 14.69% |
| 1960 | 1,603 | 36.11% | 1,183 | 26.65% | 1,653 | 37.24% |
| 1964 | 3,954 | 75.92% | 1,254 | 24.08% | 0 | 0.00% |
| 1968 | 974 | 11.37% | 3,400 | 39.70% | 4,190 | 48.93% |
| 1972 | 4,017 | 56.16% | 2,596 | 36.29% | 540 | 7.55% |
| 1976 | 3,601 | 43.14% | 4,630 | 55.46% | 117 | 1.40% |
| 1980 | 4,349 | 42.11% | 5,861 | 56.75% | 117 | 1.13% |
| 1984 | 5,989 | 55.77% | 4,642 | 43.23% | 108 | 1.01% |
| 1988 | 5,022 | 47.76% | 5,366 | 51.03% | 128 | 1.22% |
| 1992 | 3,643 | 33.06% | 5,671 | 51.46% | 1,707 | 15.49% |
| 1996 | 3,526 | 33.52% | 6,221 | 59.13% | 773 | 7.35% |
| 2000 | 5,260 | 49.64% | 5,036 | 47.53% | 300 | 2.83% |
| 2004 | 6,211 | 54.79% | 5,026 | 44.34% | 99 | 0.87% |
| 2008 | 6,883 | 56.16% | 5,242 | 42.77% | 132 | 1.08% |
| 2012 | 7,353 | 56.34% | 5,553 | 42.55% | 145 | 1.11% |
| 2016 | 8,068 | 59.76% | 5,165 | 38.26% | 267 | 1.98% |
| 2020 | 9,112 | 61.83% | 5,457 | 37.03% | 167 | 1.13% |
| 2024 | 9,359 | 67.27% | 4,426 | 31.81% | 128 | 0.92% |

== See also ==
- National Register of Historic Places listings in DeSoto Parish, Louisiana
