= U.S. Route 171 =

United States Numbered Highway in Louisiana

U.S. Highway 171
- Purple Heart Highway
- US 171 highlighted in red

Route information
- Auxiliary route of US 71
- Maintained by Louisiana DOTD
- Length: 177.441 mi (285.564 km)
- Existed: 1926–present
- Tourist routes: Louisiana Scenic Byway: Myths and Legends Byway

Major junctions
- South end: US 90 / LA 14 in Lake Charles
- I-10 in Lake Charles; US 190 / LA 12 in Ragley; US 190 / LA 27 in DeRidder; LA 10 at Pickering; LA 8 / LA 28 in Leesville; LA 6 in Many; US 84 in Mansfield; LA 3132 in Shreveport; I-20 in Shreveport
- North end: US 79 / US 80 / LA 3094 in Shreveport

Location
- Country: United States
- State: Louisiana
- Parishes: Calcasieu, Beauregard, Vernon, Sabine, DeSoto, Caddo

Highway system
- United States Numbered Highway System; List; Special; Divided; Louisiana State Highway System; Interstate; US; State; Scenic
← LA 170	→ LA 172

U.S. Highway 171 (US 171) is a part of the United States Numbered Highway System and the only route within that system currently located entirely within the state of Louisiana. It spans 177.44 miles (285.56 km) (Note: For the federal government's purposes, US 171 is listed at 179 miles (288 km) in the official U.S. Route Number Database.) in a north–south direction from the junction of US 90 and Louisiana Highway 14 (LA 14) in Lake Charles to the junction of US 79/US 80 and LA 3094 in Shreveport.

As its designation indicates, US 171 is numbered as a spur of US 71, the principal north–south U.S. Highway through Shreveport, though they technically do not intersect. US 171 traverses six of the seven parishes along the Texas state line, the only exception being Cameron Parish located on the Gulf of Mexico south of Lake Charles. The route connects all six parish seats as it travels through the thick pine forests of western Louisiana on a wide four-lane right-of-way. The northern half of the route serves as the only major north–south corridor between Interstate 49 (I-49) to the east and the Toledo Bend Reservoir along the state line to the west. Between the metropolitan areas at each terminus, US 171 passes through the smaller cities of DeRidder, Leesville, and Mansfield, as well as the towns of Rosepine, Many, Zwolle, and Stonewall. Along the way, the highway has interchanges with many of the state's major east–west routes, including Interstate 10 (I-10), US 190, LA 28, US 84, and I-20.

US 171 was created as one of the original routes of the numbered U.S. Highway system in November 1926. Its only major alignment change occurred in 1937, when the highway was shifted from what is now LA 175 between Many and Mansfield. Improvements over the years have included the paving of the entire route during the early 1930s, the elimination of many at-grade railroad crossings during the remainder of the decade, and the widening of the highway to four lanes through its urban areas during the 1960s and 1970s. Four-laning of the entire route was accomplished between 1990 and 2010 via the state's massive TIMED program with the goal of improving safety and promoting economic development along the corridor.

The route carries several honorary designations, primarily that of the Purple Heart Highway in tribute to all recipients of the Purple Heart military decoration. The route has long been associated with the U.S. Armed Forces due to its proximity to at least four military bases active during the World Wars, the lone survivor of which is Fort Polk near Leesville.

== Route description ==
=== Lake Charles to Leesville ===
From the south, US 171 begins at a junction with US 90 (Fruge Street) and LA 14 (South Martin Luther King Highway), in Lake Charles, the largest city in Calcasieu Parish and southwestern Louisiana. Traveling about 2.0 miles (3.2 km) east of the downtown area, US 171 continues the route of LA 14 northward along North Martin Luther King Highway, initially as a divided four-lane highway. After immediately crossing over the BNSF and Union Pacific (UP) railroad lines, N. Martin Luther King passes through a partial cloverleaf interchange with I-10 at exit 33, connecting with Beaumont, Texas to the west and Lafayette to the east. (Note: Northbound US 171 traffic actually utilizes Opelousas Street, a local road, to access westbound I-10 due to the lack of a ramp for this movement. Opelousas Street is state-maintained to the east of its junction with US 171 as LA 3020.) The highway gains a center turning lane and an additional northbound travel lane throughout the commercial corridor north of the interstate. Upon exiting Lake Charles, US 171 traverses a strip of wetlands with twin-span bridges over two navigable waterways, English Bayou and the Calcasieu River. After crossing the latter, the roadway remains elevated until reaching the unincorporated suburb of Moss Bluff. A junction here with LA 378 (Sam Houston Jones Parkway) leads west to Sam Houston Jones State Park and the nearby city of Westlake. US 171 maintains a combination of single and double center lanes through Moss Bluff, dropping the N. Martin Luther King Hwy signage as it passes just north of central Moses Bluff. As the surroundings become less developed, the right-of-way widens to accommodate a broad, grassy median.

North of Moss Bluff, a rural area known as Gillis introduces a mixture of open farmland, thick forest, and scattered residential development that characterizes the next 34 miles (55 km) to the city of DeRidder. During this stretch, US 171 enters Beauregard Parish and engages in a folded diamond interchange with US 190 and LA 12 that allows a grade separation with the Union Pacific Railroad line. Located in Ragley, the landscaped eastern side of the interchange doubles as a recreational area known as Purple Heart Memorial Park, echoing the official designation of US 171 as the Purple Heart Highway. US 171 proceeds due north from Ragley co-signed with US 190 through the community of Longville, located at the eastern terminus of LA 110, and enters the outskirts of DeRidder. Approaching the city limits, US 171 and US 190 pass the western termini of three rural state highways. The first, LA 394 leads to a recreational area on Bundick Lake. The others, LA 26 and LA 112, connect to Oberlin and Oakdale in neighboring Allen Parish.

Curving west into the parish seat, US 171 serves as DeRidder's main east–west commercial thoroughfare. Initially traveling along 1st Street with a center turning lane, the route divides into a one-way pair as westbound traffic transitions onto Mahlon Street. The highway then crosses the Kansas City Southern Railway (KCS) line into the downtown area, where it passes several historic buildings over the next few blocks. These include the Beauregard Parish Courthouse and an infamous Gothic structure known as the Hanging jail. US 171 ends its concurrency with US 190 by turning north onto Pine Street, an undivided four-lane thoroughfare. From this intersection, LA 27 heads south on Pine Street toward DeQuincy while US 190 continues west on the one-way pair of 1st and Shirley Streets toward Merryville. US 171 remains a commercial corridor until it crosses the Vernon Parish line, reverting to its rural configuration as it closely parallels the KCS rail line. DeRidder is separated by the small town of Rosepine by a short distance, during which an intersection with LA 3226 allows southbound traffic to bypass the city en route to US 190 west. At a point known as Pickering, located 7.7 miles (12.4 km) north of Rosepine, US 171 intersects LA 10, the first of several connections to the United States Army installation at Fort Polk. Passing to the west of the base, the highway continues through New Llano and into the larger adjacent city of Leesville.

=== Leesville to Mansfield ===
In Leesville, US 171 becomes a busy commercial corridor again, initially traveling along 5th Street's narrow four-lane right-of-way. Another one-way pair is then utilized as the parallel 6th Street begins to carry southbound traffic. In the center of town, three state highway junctions are encountered in the space of a few blocks: LA 467 (University Parkway) to Northwestern State University's Fort Polk campus; LA 468 (Lula Street) to the historic business district; and westbound LA 8 (Nolan Trace Parkway) toward Jasper, Texas. US 171 proceeds north concurrent with LA 8 and descends below grade to cross under the KCS railroad line. Curving to the northwest, the highway's travel lanes converge as it approaches a roundabout. Here, at the northern end of town, LA 8 departs to the east and travels concurrently with LA 28 toward Alexandria, the principal city of central Louisiana. During its remaining 15.4 miles (24.8 km) in Vernon Parish, US 171 crosses the northeastern tip of Vernon Lake (Note: Signage at the Vernon Lake bridge identifies the waterway as Anacoco Creek, which was impounded in 1963 to create the lake.) and passes through the rural towns of Anacoco and Hornbeck. Junctions there with LA 111 and LA 392, respectively, lead to points along the vast Toledo Bend Reservoir located on the Texas state line.

US 171 enters Sabine Parish winding gently through the rural hilly woodlands while passing the entrance to Hodges Gardens State Park, the largest horticultural park in the United States. The route proceeds through the village of Florien, where a Boise Cascade lumber plant is located, and into Fisher, its smaller neighbor. US 171 then curves northwest and enters the town of Many, the parish seat. Cutting a serpentine path through the street grid outside the downtown area, the highway crosses LA 6 (San Antonio Avenue), which follows a section of the historic Old San Antonio Road (or El Camino Real) between San Antonio, Texas and Natchitoches, Louisiana. Regaining its wide rural right-of-way, US 171 intersects the southern terminus of LA 175, leading to Belmont and Pleasant Hill. US 171 makes a bee-line to the northwest over the 8.8 miles (14.2 km) between Many and Zwolle. Served by the highway's only business route, Zwolle is bypassed by mainline US 171, which travels around its east and north sides, intersecting LA 120 in the process. Signage also directs motorists onto US 171 Bus. to access North Toledo Bend State Park. US 171 comes closest to reaching the Toledo Bend Reservoir at Zwolle and the neighboring village of Noble.

After crossing over the KCS Railway at Noble, US 171 curves back to the north and intersects LA 174 in the village of Converse. Closely following the rail line once again, US 171 crosses into DeSoto Parish just south of Benson, a point located at an intersection with LA 512. 5.0 miles (8.0 km) later, the highway makes an S-curve across the KCS line on a high twin-span overpass before proceeding due north into South Mansfield, a small village connected to the city of Mansfield, the parish seat. In Mansfield proper, US 171 follows Jenkins Street and intersects US 84 at Washington Avenue, connecting with Logansport to the west. US 84 overlaps US 171 for a short distance until reaching Polk Street, while the bypassed original mainline route follows the continuation of Washington Avenue signed as US 84 Bus. At Polk Street, signage points motorists onto eastbound US 84 toward the Mansfield State Historic Site, a Civil War battlefield, as well as the former Mansfield Female College, the first institution of higher learning for women west of the Mississippi River. US 84 also leads eastward to an interchange with I-49.

=== Shreveport metropolitan area ===
As it enters the Shreveport metropolitan area, US 171 begins to approach and eventually parallel the route of I-49, the state's major north–south highway. After curving northwest out of Mansfield, US 171 passes the DeSoto Parish Airport and heads through Grand Cane, located at a junction with LA 3015. 5.0 miles (8.0 km) later, the highway bends due north again and then crosses LA 5 at a junction in Gloster known as Kickapoo. Just before crossing into Caddo Parish, US 171 passes through the town of Stonewall and intersects LA 3276, a connector to I-49. Across the parish line, US 171 crosses underneath the Union Pacific Railroad tracks in the unincorporated community of Keithville. Residential development gradually increases as the highway parallels the UPRR line toward the Shreveport city limits.

US 171 enters Shreveport on Mansfield Road and retains its wide median as it becomes a heavily traveled commercial corridor once again. The highway has junctions with LA 525 (Colquitt Road), as well as LA 526, a major thoroughfare along the south side of town called the Bert Kouns Industrial Loop Expressway. Larger shopping developments line the roadway as US 171 approaches an interchange with LA 3132 (Terry Bradshaw Passway), a freeway loop commonly known as the Inner Loop Expressway. LA 3132 complements the I-220 northern bypass of Shreveport and connects to major interchanges with I-20 to the northwest and I-49 to the east. Some movements between US 171 and LA 3132 are accomplished through a connected interchange with Jewella Avenue, a divided thoroughfare that branches off of Mansfield Road.

Proceeding northward, US 171 crosses over the UPRR line for the final time and intersects LA 511 (West 70th Street). The highway immediately branches off of Mansfield Road itself, transferring onto Hearne Avenue. Its median now replaced by a center turning lane, US 171 travels through a primarily residential neighborhood until passing through a diamond interchange with I-20 at exit 16A. This interchange is located at the edge of the State Fair Grounds, an area which also houses the Louisiana State Exhibit Museum and three sports facilities—Independence Stadium, the Hirsch Memorial Coliseum, and a baseball stadium. US 171 reaches its northern terminus a short distance beyond I-20 at a junction with the concurrent US 79/US 80 (Greenwood Road). Hearne Avenue continues straight ahead as LA 3094 toward a junction with northbound US 71/LA 1 just outside Downtown Shreveport.

=== Route classification and data ===
US 171 carries at least four lanes of traffic for its entire length. It alternates between a rural and urban principal arterial over the course of its route, as determined by the Louisiana Department of Transportation and Development (La DOTD). Daily traffic volume in 2013 peaked at 37,700 vehicles in Shreveport and 29,800 in Lake Charles. The lowest figure reported was 2,200 vehicles north of Hornbeck in southern Sabine Parish. The posted speed limit ranges from 65 mph (105 km/h) throughout most divided rural stretches to as low as 35 mph (55 km/h) within some corporate limits.

Since 2003, virtually the entire route of US 171 has been officially designated as the Purple Heart Highway in recognition of all Purple Heart recipients. The only exceptions are the portion from its southern starting point in Lake Charles to central Moses Bluff, named in 1982 for Martin Luther King Jr., and another in Rosepine named for its former mayor Johnnie B. Hall in 1997. Decades earlier, two markers were installed on US 171 identifying it as a Blue Star Memorial Highway as "a tribute to the Armed Forces that have defended the United States of America." The first was dedicated on March 17, 1957 at the roadside park in Ragley. The second was dedicated on November 11, 1964 at the intersection with Washington Street in DeRidder.

Additionally, a 16.7-mile (26.9 km) stretch of US 171, extending from LA 26 south of DeRidder to LA 10 south of Leesville, serves as part of the Myths and Legends Byway in the state-designated system of tourist routes known as the Louisiana Scenic Byways.

== History ==
=== Original route and early improvements ===
US 171 was designated in November 1926 as one of the original routes of the numbered U.S. Highway system. The majority of the route, extending from Lake Charles to Many, has remained largely unchanged to the present day. North of Many, however, US 171 was initially routed along the current LA 175 to Mansfield, where it rejoined the modern alignment into Shreveport. The entire route was also initially co-signed with Louisiana's corresponding state highway designations as created in 1921. These consisted of State Route 42 from Lake Charles to Many, State Route 51 from Many to Belmont, and State Route 1 from Belmont to Shreveport. This practice was discontinued when the state highway system was renumbered in 1955.

Upon its designation in 1926, US 171 was generally a gravel road outside the city of Shreveport. By the summer of 1932, however, the entire highway was paved with two lanes of concrete aside from the Many–Mansfield section. Instead, the modern alignment via Zwolle, which was also the northern portion of Route 42 prior to 1955, was being straightened and paved to serve as US 171. The revised route also received two grade separations with the Kansas City Southern Railway line that were constructed in 1934. These consisted of an overpass at Noble and an underpass at Trenton, about four miles (6.4 km) south of Mansfield. Completed at the end of 1937, this would be the only major alignment change in the highway's history and the only instance in which the paved alignment significantly differed from the established gravel road. Minor deviations, mostly near the highway's southern end, included a diagonal cutoff that bypassed a section line road zigzag running northwest from Gillis (Note: The original route through the Gillis area followed what is now Gillis Cutoff and North Perkins Ferry Road. This route remained for a time in the pre-1955 state highway system as State Route 42-E. The suffix indicated a former alignment of Route 42, the state highway counterpart to US 171.) and the straightening of the route through Longville. (Note: Only part of the original alignment through Longville survives as a local road named Cedar Street.)

During the mid- to late 1930s, six additional grade separations were constructed elsewhere along US 171, eliminating nearly every railroad crossing along the route. The first was an overpass of the now abandoned Gulf, Colorado and Santa Fe Railway just east of DeRidder in 1934. The others were constructed beginning in 1935 as part of a federally funded grade separation program. That year, $3.2 million was allocated for this purpose by a Works Progress Administration program and was earmarked by the Louisiana Highway Commission for 28 separate projects. Those projects along US 171 consisted of overpasses of the Southern Pacific Lines at Lake Charles, the Gulf Coast Lines at Ragley, and the Texas and Pacific Railway at both Grand Cane and Shreveport, as well as an underpass of the Kansas City Southern at Leesville. (Note: The Texas and Pacific line through Grand Cane has since been abandoned, while the crossings at Lake Charles, Ragley (formerly identified as Fulton), and Shreveport are now operated by the Union Pacific Railroad.) The overpasses were all completed in 1937, with the Leesville underpass following in 1939. All have since been replaced or supplemented with newer four-lane crossings, except the DeRidder and Grand Cane structures, which have been eliminated due to abandonment of the railroad lines.

=== Urban improvements and initial widening projects ===
The next burst of activity in improving US 171 occurred in Caddo Parish, where the entirety of Mansfield Road from the DeSoto Parish line to LA 511 in Shreveport was reconstructed and straightened beginning in 1951. Several sections of the original roadway still exist as local roads, now re-named as Old Mansfield Road, that weave in and out of the current alignment. Additionally, the portion from Southland Park Drive to Jewella Avenue now serves as a frontage road to the modern route. The project was completed in 1954 at a cost of $1,921,000. The new alignment also included an underpass of the Texas and New Orleans Railroad line at Keithville, replacing the grade crossing there. In 1959, the final alignment change in Shreveport had US 171 transition from Mansfield Road onto Hearne Avenue to reach its northern terminus, giving the highway its first section of four-lane pavement. Around 1965, two additional lanes were built on Mansfield Road extending south to LA 526. This was roughly concurrent with the opening of the I-20 interchange on Hearne Avenue, connecting US 171 with the new expressway through Downtown Shreveport and improving access to the US 80 corridor east of the city. The highway was then widened southward through the Keithville area in 1967, making US 171 four lanes throughout both the city of Shreveport and Caddo Parish.

The opposite end of US 171 received its first section of four-lane pavement in the early 1960s when the roadway was widened in Lake Charles between the southern terminus at US 90 (Broad Street) and Fruge Street. However, these few blocks of US 171 soon became part of LA 14. The opening of I-10 through Downtown Lake Charles in April 1963 resulted in the re-routing of US 90 onto Fruge Street, and the southern terminus of US 171 was shifted accordingly. (Note: The official Louisiana highway maps did not show the new terminus of US 171 until 1971, but contemporary photographs show that the signage had indeed been changed.) The I-10 interchange on US 171 was partially opened to traffic at this time. Its full opening would occur in February 1964 when the interstate was completed eastward to US 165 at Iowa. In the mid-1960s, four-lane sections of US 171 were also opened to facilitate traffic through two smaller cities. In Mansfield, Washington Avenue was widened and extended southwest, improving the routes of both US 84 and US 171 through town and eliminating two right-angle turns. (Note: Since 1937, US 171 had traveled north on Jenkins Street, east on McEnery Street, and north on Washington Avenue to Polk Street in Mansfield.) In DeRidder, a one-way pair was used after Mahlon Street was improved and extended eastward, taking northbound US 171 (and westbound US 190) traffic off of parallel 1st Street.

Two further improvements during the 1960s involved new bridges along the route. The first was a replacement of the Anacoco Creek bridge in 1967 with a higher span. This was necessitated by an impoundment of the creek four years earlier that created the recreational Vernon Lake. A more substantial project completed in 1969 overhauled the two most significant water crossings on US 171, the English Bayou and Calcasieu River bridges between Lake Charles and Moss Bluff. The original narrow two-lane spans dating from the 1920s were replaced with four-lane spans on a new four-lane alignment further west. (Though the bridges were demolished in 1973, the land portions of the route still exist as Old US 171, partially as local roads leading to public boat launches and partially on private property.) In 1972, the remaining gap in the four-lane alignment in Lake Charles between Fruge Street and the new bridge approach was widened. Central to this project was the twinning of the railroad overpass south of I-10.

=== Completing the four-lane highway ===
Since the 1970s, construction projects on US 171 have mainly focused on completing the highway to four-lane capacity throughout its entire length. This was cited by commercial and political interests as crucial for the economic development of the corridor and a necessary step in preventing the loss of economic opportunities to the US 59 corridor in East Texas. Leesville was the last urban area through which the highway was widened, despite the Army personnel at Fort Polk having pushed the Louisiana Department of Highways for this improvement over several decades. Four-lane segments through the Leesville area were completed approximately as follows: through New Llano and north toward LA 467 in 1975, south from New Llano toward Pickering in 1978, further south to DeRidder in 1981, and finally northward through the city of Leesville in 1982. This last segment involved the creation of a one-way pair using an improved 6th Street to carry southbound traffic and the construction of a parallel railroad underpass. US 171 was further widened northward from Leesville to Anacoco in 1986. Meanwhile in Shreveport, the highway was widened southward from the Caddo–DeSoto parish line through Stonewall in 1981, joining with the four lanes extending from there to LA 5 in Gloster constructed in the late 1970s. The final highway interchange on US 171 was opened between 1981 and 1983 when the Inner Loop Expressway (LA 3132) was completed through the area.

The above projects left two long segments of two-lane pavement remaining on US 171, extending from Moss Bluff to DeRidder and from Anacoco to Gloster. The widening of these mostly rural stretches was eventually accomplished as a major component of the Transportation Infrastructure Model for Economic Development program. Approved by the Louisiana Legislature in 1989 and declared as the "single largest transportation program in state history," the TIMED program was initially funded from a 4¢ per gallon gasoline tax which allowed an estimated completion date around 2031. After falling far behind schedule by the late 1990s, the legislature approved the first of several bond measures to fast-track the program. The widening of US 171 was divided into 23 projects totaling approximately 121 miles (195 km) and carried out between 1990 and 2010. As before, the four-lane alignment mostly followed the established two-lane with minor deviations to straighten various curves in the roadbed. This is most evident between Mansfield and Grand Cane, where the entire route was reconstructed and straightened.

However, more significant changes were carried out in a few locations. A new route through Many bypassed the downtown area, discontinuing the concurrency with LA 6. (Note: US 171 formerly travelled north on Fisher Road and Church Street, west on San Antonio Avenue with LA 6 through the Many business district, and north on Shreveport Highway to rejoin the current alignment.) The neighboring town of Zwolle was bypassed altogether with a new alignment constructed around its northeast side. In this case, the old route through town was retained as US 171 Bus., which was designated in 2008. The route through Mansfield was also streamlined via the widening and extension of Jenkins Street, which benefitted the concurrent US 84 as well. Here, the original four-lane section of Washington Avenue was retained as US 84 Bus. (Note: North of Polk Street, US 171 formerly proceeded north on Washington Avenue, west and north on Oak Street, and west on Hope Street to rejoin the current alignment out of Mansfield.) These improvements eliminated all but one right-angle turn along the entirety of US 171, located in the center of DeRidder. Finally, the two-lane railroad underpass at Trenton was replaced by a twin-span overpass located about 1.5 miles (2.4 km) to the south. The old crossing remains in service as a local road called Old US 171 or Trenton Road. After a total expenditure of $650 million, US 171 was completed as a four-lane highway when a 6.6-mile (10.6 km) section between Florien and Many was opened to traffic in July 2010.

The latest improvement to US 171 involved the installation of a roundabout at the northern end of Leesville. It was the first roundabout to be constructed in the seven parishes forming the state highway department's District No. 8. Located at the junction with eastbound LA 8/LA 28, the junction was previously a signalized T-intersection that was the site of numerous accidents and frequent traffic pileups. Construction began in October 2010, and the project was completed with a ribbon-cutting by Governor Bobby Jindal on August 5, 2011 after an expenditure of $2.1 million.

== Major intersections ==
Parish	Location	mi	km	Destinations	Notes
Calcasieu	Lake Charles	0.000– 0.022	0.000– 0.035	US 90 (Fruge Street) to I-10 – Beaumont, Lafayette LA 14 south (Martin L. King Highway) – Cameron	Southern terminus of US 171; western terminus of LA 14
Calcasieu	Lake Charles	0.509	0.819	LA 3020 east (Opelousas Street) to I-10 west	Western terminus of LA 3020
Calcasieu	Lake Charles	0.622– 0.998	1.001– 1.606	I-10 – Beaumont, Lafayette	Exit 33 on I-10; no access from US 171 north to I-10 west
Calcasieu	Lake Charles	2.467– 2.654	3.970– 4.271	Bridge over English Bayou	
Calcasieu		2.873	4.624	LA 3059 east (Old Town Road)	Western terminus of LA 3059
Calcasieu	Moss Bluff	3.362– 4.448	5.411– 7.158	Bridge over Calcasieu River	
Calcasieu	Moss Bluff	4.720	7.596	LA 378 west (Sam Houston Jones Parkway) – Westlake	Northeastern terminus of LA 378; to Sam Houston Jones State Park
Beauregard	Ragley	20.095– 20.592	32.340– 33.140	US 190 east – Kinder LA 12 west – DeQuincy	Interchange; southern end of US 190 concurrency; eastern terminus of LA 12
Beauregard	Longville	26.622	42.844	LA 110 west – Singer, Merryville	Eastern terminus of LA 110
Beauregard		39.075	62.885	LA 394 east – Bundick Lake, Dry Creek	Western terminus of LA 394
Beauregard		41.759– 41.850	67.205– 67.351	LA 26 east – Oberlin	Western terminus of LA 26
Beauregard		43.270	69.636	LA 112 east – Oakdale	Western terminus of LA 112
Beauregard	DeRidder	45.589	73.368	US 190 west (Shirley Street, West 1st Street) – Merryville LA 27 south (South Pine Street) – DeQuincy	Northern end of US 190 concurrency (one-way pair); northern terminus of LA 27; to Beauregard Regional Airport
Vernon		49.330	79.389	LA 3226 west to US 190 west	Eastern terminus of LA 3226
Vernon	Rosepine	50.691	81.579	LA 1146 east (Ikes Road)	Western terminus of LA 1146
Vernon	Pickering	58.426	94.028	LA 10 east (Pitkin Highway) – Cravens, Pitkin	Western terminus of LA 10; to Fort Polk South Gates
Vernon	New Llano	64.323	103.518	LA 1211 south (Vernon Street)	Northern terminus of LA 1211
Vernon	Leesville	65.971	106.170	LA 467 south (University Parkway)	Northern terminus of LA 467; to Northwestern State University at Fort Polk
Vernon	Leesville	66.391	106.846	LA 468 east (East Lula Street) – Leesville Business District	Western terminus of LA 468
Vernon	Leesville	66.485	106.997	LA 8 west (Nolan Trace Parkway) – Jasper	Southern end of LA 8 concurrency; to Leesville Airport
Vernon	Leesville	67.217– 67.317	108.175– 108.336	LA 1213 north (Kurthwood Road)	Southern terminus of LA 1213
Vernon	Leesville	67.622– 67.761	108.827– 109.051	LA 8 east / LA 28 east (Alexandria Highway) – Alexandria	Roundabout; northern end of LA 8 concurrency; western terminus of LA 28
Vernon	Anacoco	75.718	121.856	LA 111 (Port Arthur Avenue) – Burr Ferry, Burkeville	To Toledo Bend Dam
Vernon	Hornbeck	82.233	132.341	LA 392 (Port Arthur Avenue)	To South Toledo Bend State Park
Sabine	Florien	91.312	146.952	LA 474 west (West Port Arthur Avenue)	Eastern terminus of LA 474
Sabine	Florien	92.553	148.950	LA 118 east (Louisiana Maneuvers Highway) – Kisatchie	Western terminus of LA 118
Sabine	Many	100.950	162.463	LA 6 (San Antonio Avenue) – Natchitoches, Milam	
Sabine	Many	101.922	164.028	LA 175 north – Belmont, Pleasant Hill	Southern terminus of LA 175
Sabine		109.838	176.767	US 171 Bus. north (North Main Street) – Zwolle, Toledo Bend	Southern terminus of US 171 Bus.; to North Toledo Bend State Park
Sabine	Zwolle	110.470	177.784	LA 1216 east (Gay Street)	Western terminus of LA 1216
Sabine	Zwolle	110.982	178.608	LA 120 east (Oak Street) – Belmont, Robeline	Western terminus of LA 120
Sabine	Zwolle	112.543	181.120	US 171 Bus. south (Obrie Street) – Zwolle, Toledo Bend	Northern terminus of US 171 Bus.; to North Toledo Bend State Park
Sabine	Noble	115.844	186.433	LA 1218 west	Eastern terminus of LA 1218
Sabine	Noble	116.146	186.919	LA 483 north	Southern terminus of LA 483
Sabine	Converse	123.224	198.310	LA 174 (Port Arthur Avenue) – Pleasant Hill	
DeSoto	Benson	129.235	207.984	LA 512 east	Western terminus of LA 512
DeSoto	Mansfield	140.926	226.798	US 84 west / US 84 Bus. east (Washington Avenue) – Logansport	Southern end of US 84 concurrency; western terminus of US 84 Bus.
DeSoto	Mansfield	141.556	227.812	US 84 east (Polk Street) to I-49 – Coushatta	Northern end of US 84 concurrency; to Mansfield SCA Civil War Area and Mansfield Female College Museum
DeSoto	Grand Cane	148.416	238.852	LA 3015 (Holly Street, Shelby Street) – Longstreet	
DeSoto	Gloster	156.340	251.605	LA 5 – Gloster, Keachi	Location also known as Kickapoo
DeSoto	Stonewall	162.739	261.903	LA 3276 east (Stonewall-Frierson Road) to I-49	Western terminus of LA 3276
DeSoto	Stonewall			I-69	Proposed; Future I-69 in Louisiana
Caddo	Shreveport	170.863	274.977	LA 525 south (Colquitt Road) – Spring Ridge	Northern terminus of LA 525
Caddo	Shreveport	171.380– 171.428	275.809– 275.887	LA 526 (Bert Kouns Industrial Loop Expressway)	
Caddo	Shreveport	172.562– 172.843	277.712– 278.164	LA 3132 (Terry Bradshaw Passway) to Jewella Avenue	Exits 4 (eastbound) and 5 (westbound) on LA 3132
Caddo	Shreveport	174.567– 174.575	280.938– 280.951	LA 511 (West 70th Street)	
Caddo	Shreveport	177.063– 177.203	284.955– 285.181	I-20 – Monroe, Dallas	Exit 16A on I-20
Caddo	Shreveport	177.441	285.564	US 79 / US 80 (Greenwood Road) LA 3094 north (Hearne Avenue) to US 71 / LA 1 north	Northern terminus of US 171; southern terminus of LA 3094
1.000 mi = 1.609 km; 1.000 km = 0.621 mi: Concurrency terminus

== Business route ==
U.S. Highway 171 Business
- Location: Zwolle
- Length: 3.112 mi (5.008 km)
- Existed: 2008–present

U.S. Highway 171 Business (US 171 Bus.) runs 3.11 miles (5.01 km) in a general north–south direction through Zwolle, a town in Sabine Parish. It follows the original two-lane route of US 171 before the completion of a four-lane bypass in 2008.

From the southeast, US 171 Bus. begins at a junction with mainline US 171 just east of the Zwolle corporate limits. The route heads west into town on North Main Street alongside the Kansas City Southern Railway (KCS) line. In the center of town, signage directs motorists south on Obrie Street (LA 475) toward North Toledo Bend State Park. US 171 Bus. turns north onto the same thoroughfare and proceeds out of the downtown area. At an intersection with Willow Street and Old Pleasant Hill Road, the route begins an S-curve that terminates at a second junction with mainline US 171 at the north end of town.

US 171 Bus. is classified as a rural principal arterial by the Louisiana Department of Transportation and Development (La DOTD). The average daily traffic volume in 2013 ranged from 4,200 to 6,000 vehicles. The posted speed limit ranges from 35 mph (55 km/h) through the center of town to 45 mph (70 km/h) near the junctions with mainline US 171 at either end of the route.

Major intersections
The entire highway is in Sabine Parish.

Location	mi	km	Destinations	Notes
	0.000– 0.016	0.000– 0.026	US 171 – Many, Shreveport	Southern terminus
Zwolle	1.528	2.459	LA 475 south (Obrie Street)	Northern terminus of LA 475; to North Toledo Bend State Park
Zwolle	3.098– 3.112	4.986– 5.008	US 171 – Many, Shreveport	Northern terminus
1.000 mi = 1.609 km; 1.000 km = 0.621 mi
