= List of state highways in Louisiana (3050–3099) =

The following is a list of state highways in the U.S. state of Louisiana designated in the 3050-3099 range.

== Louisiana Highway 3050 ==
Louisiana Highway 3050
- Location: Morganza
- Length: 1.59 mi (2.56 km)

Louisiana Highway 3050 (LA 3050) runs 1.59 miles (2.56 km) in Morganza.

== Louisiana Highway 3051 ==
Louisiana Highway 3051
- Location: Bastrop
- Length: 6.11 mi (9.83 km)

Louisiana Highway 3051 (LA 3051) runs 6.11 miles (9.83 km) in Bastrop.

== Louisiana Highway 3052 ==
Louisiana Highway 3052
- Location: Gray–Raceland
- Length: 11.0 mi (17.7 km)
- Existed: c. 1962–c. 1997

Louisiana Highway 3052 (LA 3052) ran approximately 11.0 miles (17.7 km) in an east–west direction along what is now US 90 from a point west of Gray to a point south of Raceland. Between the early 1960s and late 1990s, LA 3052 was used as a temporary designation for the relocation of US 167 from Opelousas to Lafayette and US 90 from Lafayette to Raceland.

In its final incarnation, LA 3052 began at an interchange with LA 311 at what is now Exit 200 on US 90. It proceeded east through an interchange with LA 24 in Gray and crossed from Terrebonne Parish into Lafourche Parish at an interchange with LA 316. LA 3052 ended at an interchange with US 90 and LA 3198 (now LA 182) south of Raceland. It was a four-lane controlled-access highway for its entire length.

In the early 1960s, construction began on the first project that would eventually relocate US 90 and US 167 onto a new four-lane alignment between Opelousas and Raceland. The new route was built as LA 3052 and became part of US 90 and US 167 as various sections were completed. At the same time, LA 182 was extended to cover the old alignment. The first section between Opelousas and Sunset opened about 1962. Once the highway was extended to Lafayette three years later, it became part of US 167, now upgraded to a freeway as part of I-49. At the same time, the section from Lafayette to Broussard was opened and soon became part of US 90. Between the late 1960s and early 1980s, the relocation of US 90 was extended in stages from Broussard to Morgan City. In 1978, the Raceland bypass was completed. Its extension west to Gray around 1983 remained as LA 3052 for over twenty years until the final section east from Morgan City was opened about 1997.

Parish	Location	mi	km	Destinations	Notes
Terrebonne		0.0	0.0	LA 311 – Houma, Schriever	Western terminus; interchange
Terrebonne	Gray	2.0	3.2	LA 24 – Houma, Thibodaux	Interchange
Terrebonne–Lafourche parish line		4.0	6.4	LA 316 – Gray, Bourg	Interchange
Lafourche		11.0	17.7	US 90 – Houma, New Orleans; LA 3198 – Raceland	Eastern terminus of LA 3152; southern terminus of LA 3198
1.000 mi = 1.609 km; 1.000 km = 0.621 mi

== Louisiana Highway 3054 ==
Louisiana Highway 3054
- Location: Alexandria
- Length: 1.22 mi (1.96 km)

Louisiana Highway 3054 (LA 3054) runs 1.22 miles (1.96 km) in Alexandria.

== Louisiana Highway 3055 ==
Louisiana Highway 3055
- Location: Jennings
- Length: 0.59 mi (950 m)

Louisiana Highway 3055 (LA 3055) runs 0.59 miles (0.95 km) in Jennings.

The entire highway is in Jennings, Jefferson Davis Parish.

mi	km	Destinations	Notes
0.0	0.0	LA 26	Western terminus
0.59	0.95	US 90 / LA 102 (Cutting Avenue)	Eastern terminus
1.000 mi = 1.609 km; 1.000 km = 0.621 mi

== Louisiana Highway 3056 ==
Louisiana Highway 3056
- Location: Illinois Point
- Length: 4.21 mi (6.78 km)

Louisiana Highway 3056 (LA 3056) runs 4.21 miles (6.78 km) in Illinois Point.

Parish	Location	mi	km	Destinations	Notes
Jefferson Davis		0.000	0.000	LA 14 – Lake Arthur, Kaplan	Northern terminus
Cameron		4.21	6.78	PR 129	Southern terminus; dead end
1.000 mi = 1.609 km; 1.000 km = 0.621 mi

== Louisiana Highway 3057 ==
Louisiana Highway 3057
- Location: St. Francisville
- Length: 2.46 mi (3.96 km)
- Existed: c. 1959–2018

Louisiana Highway 3057 (LA 3057) ran 2.46 miles (3.96 km) in a general southeast to northwest direction along Commerce Street in a loop off of US 61 in St. Francisville.

The route was deleted in 2018 as part of the La DOTD's Road Transfer program.

The entire highway was in St. Francisville, West Feliciana Parish.

mi	km	Destinations	Notes
0.0	0.0	US 61 – Baton Rouge, Natchez	Southern terminus
1.0	1.6	LA 1263 west (Ferdinand Street)	South end of LA 1263 concurrency
1.4	2.3	LA 1263 east (Jackson Road) – Jackson	South end of LA 1263 concurrency
2.4	3.9	US 61 – Baton Rouge, Natchez	Northern terminus
1.000 mi = 1.609 km; 1.000 km = 0.621 mi: Concurrency terminus

== Louisiana Highway 3059 ==
Louisiana Highway 3059
- Location: Moss Bluff-Jefferson Davis Parish
- Length: 11.42 mi (18.38 km)

Louisiana Highway 3059 (LA 3059) runs 11.42 miles (18.38 km) from Moss Bluff, Calcasieu Parish to an area in Jefferson Davis Parish.

Parish	Location	mi	km	Destinations	Notes
Calcasieu	Moss Bluff	0.0	0.0	US 171 – Lake Charles, DeRidder	Western terminus
Calcasieu		4.3	6.9	LA 397 – Cameron, Moss Bluff	Northern terminus of LA 397
Jefferson Davis		11.42	18.38	LA 383 – Iowa, Kinder	Eastern terminus
1.000 mi = 1.609 km; 1.000 km = 0.621 mi

== Louisiana Highway 3060 ==
Louisiana Highway 3060
- Location: Luling
- Length: 1.16 mi (1.87 km)
- Existed: 1960s–present

Louisiana Highway 3060 (LA 3060) runs 1.16 miles (1.87 km) in a north–south direction along Barton Avenue from US 90 to LA 18 (River Road) in Luling, St. Charles Parish.

The route serves as a connector between its termini, crossing several railroad tracks at grade and passing through a residential neighborhood. The posted speed limit is 25 miles per hour (40 km/h). It is an undivided two-lane highway for its entire length.

The entire highway is in Luling, St. Charles Parish.

mi	km	Destinations	Notes
0.0	0.0	US 90	Southern terminus
1.2	1.9	LA 18 (River Road)	Northern terminus
1.000 mi = 1.609 km; 1.000 km = 0.621 mi

== Louisiana Highway 3061 ==
Louisiana Highway 3061
- Location: Ruston
- Length: 5.29 mi (8.51 km)

Louisiana Highway 3061 (LA 3061) runs 5.29 miles (8.51 km) in Ruston.

== Louisiana Highway 3062 ==
Louisiana Highway 3062
- Location: Homer
- Length: 4.94 mi (7.95 km)

Louisiana Highway 3062 (LA 3062) runs 4.94 miles (7.95 km) in Homer.

== Louisiana Highway 3063 ==
Louisiana Highway 3063
- Location: Vinton
- Length: 4.80 mi (7.72 km)

Louisiana Highway 3063 (LA 3063) runs 4.80 miles (7.72 km) in Vinton.

== Louisiana Highway 3064 ==
Louisiana Highway 3064
- Location: Baton Rouge
- Length: 4.41 mi (7.10 km)
- Existed: 1960s–present

Louisiana Highway 3064 (LA 3064) runs 4.41 miles (7.10 km) in a north–south direction along Staring Lane and Essen Lane from Burbank Drive to LA 73 (Jefferson Highway) in Baton Rouge, East Baton Rouge Parish.

The entire highway is in Baton Rouge, East Baton Rouge Parish.

mi	km	Destinations	Notes
0.0	0.0	Burbank Drive	Southern terminus
0.56	0.90	Highland Road	
2.55	4.10	LA 427 (Perkins Road)	
3.56	5.73	I-10 – Baton Rouge, New Orleans	Exit 160 on I-10
4.07– 4.36	6.55– 7.02	I-12 – Baton Rouge, Hammond	Exit 1B on I-12; no westbound exit
4.41	7.10	LA 73 (Jefferson Highway)	Northern terminus
1.000 mi = 1.609 km; 1.000 km = 0.621 mi: Incomplete access

== Louisiana Highway 3066 ==
Louisiana Highway 3066
- Location: Crescent–Plaquemine
- Length: 9.96 mi (16.03 km)

Louisiana Highway 3066 (LA 3066) runs 9.96 miles (16.03 km) from Crescent to Plaquemine.

== Louisiana Highway 3067 ==
Louisiana Highway 3067
- Location: Acadia Parish
- Length: 3.77 mi (6.07 km)

Louisiana Highway 3067 (LA 3067) runs 3.77 miles (6.07 km) in Acadia Parish.

The entire route is in Acadia Parish.

mi	km	Destinations	Notes
0.0	0.0	LA 91	Eastern terminus
3.77	6.07	LA 370	Western terminus
1.000 mi = 1.609 km; 1.000 km = 0.621 mi

== Louisiana Highway 3068 ==
Louisiana Highway 3068
- Location: Acadia Parish
- Length: 5.05 mi (8.13 km)

Louisiana Highway 3068 (LA 3068) runs 5.05 miles (8.13 km) in Acadia Parish.

Parish	Location	mi	km	Destinations	Notes
Acadia	0.0	0.0	LA 97	Eastern terminus	
Acadia–Evangeline parish line	5.05	8.13	US 190	Southern terminus	
1.000 mi = 1.609 km; 1.000 km = 0.621 mi

== Louisiana Highway 3069 ==
Louisiana Highway 3069
- Location: Franklin
- Length: 0.18 mi (290 m)
- Existed: 1961–present

Louisiana Highway 3069 (LA 3069) runs 0.18 miles (0.29 km) in Franklin.

== Louisiana Highway 3070 ==
Louisiana Highway 3070
- Location: Ellis
- Length: 6.73 mi (10.83 km)

Louisiana Highway 3070 (LA 3070) runs 6.73 miles (10.83 km) in Ellis.

== Louisiana Highway 3071 ==
Louisiana Highway 3071
- Location: LaSalle Parish
- Length: 3.68 mi (5.92 km)

Louisiana Highway 3071 (LA 3071) runs 3.68 miles (5.92 km) in LaSalle Parish.

== Louisiana Highway 3072 ==
Louisiana Highway 3072
- Location: Vienna
- Length: 3.31 mi (5.33 km)

Louisiana Highway 3072 (LA 3072) runs 3.31 miles (5.33 km) in Vienna.

== Louisiana Highway 3073 ==
Louisiana Highway 3073
- Location: Lafayette–Broussard
- Length: 9.56 mi (15.39 km)
- Existed: 1960s–present

Louisiana Highway 3073 (LA 3073) runs 9.56 miles (15.39 km) in a northwest to southeast direction along Ambassador Caffery Parkway from US 167 in Lafayette to US 90 in Broussard, Lafayette Parish. State maintenance continues a short distance east of US 90 onto Corne Road to the entrance to Zoosiana (the Zoo of Acadiana).

The route is a western bypass of Lafayette that also serves as a primary commercial corridor for the growing suburbs southwest of the city. Along the way, LA 3073 crosses the Vermilion River and passes the Mall of Acadiana. The eastern portion of the route connecting with US 90 in Broussard was an extension opened in 2010. On the opposite end, Ambassador Caffery Parkway continues beyond US 167 as a local road. It then becomes part of LA 3184, connecting with US 90 and I-10 west of downtown Lafayette and terminating at LA 725 (Renaud Drive).

== Louisiana Highway 3074 ==
Louisiana Highway 3074
- Location: Simsboro
- Length: 2.42 mi (3.89 km)

Louisiana Highway 3074 (LA 3074) runs 2.42 miles (3.89 km) in Simsboro.

== Louisiana Highway 3075 ==
Louisiana Highway 3075
- Location: White Castle–St. Gabriel
- Length: 0.26 mi (420 m)
- Existed: 1960s–present

Louisiana Highway 3075 (LA 3075) is the designation for the state-maintained approaches to the defunct White Castle Ferry across the Mississippi River in Iberville Parish. The service connected LA 405 east of White Castle with LA 141 in an area within the St. Gabriel city limits known as Carville. LA 405 and LA 141 travel alongside the west and east bank levees of the river, respectively.

The entire highway is in Iberville Parish.

Location	mi	km	Destinations	Notes
	0.0	0.0	LA 405 (River Road)	Southern terminus
Mississippi River			White Castle Ferry	
St. Gabriel	0.3	0.48	LA 141 (Point Clair Road)	Northern terminus
1.000 mi = 1.609 km; 1.000 km = 0.621 mi

== Louisiana Highway 3076 ==
Louisiana Highway 3076
- Location: Rayne
- Length: 1.62 mi (2.61 km)
- Existed: 1960s–2018

Louisiana Highway 3076 (LA 3076) ran 1.62 miles (2.61 km) in Rayne.

The route was deleted in 2018 as part of the La DOTD Road Transfer program.

== Louisiana Highway 3078 ==
Louisiana Highway 3078
- Location: Tensas Parish
- Length: 0.45 mi (720 m)

Louisiana Highway 3078 (LA 3078) runs 0.45 miles (0.72 km) in Tensas Parish.

== Louisiana Highway 3079 ==
Louisiana Highway 3079
- Location: Collinston
- Length: 1.08 mi (1.74 km)
- Existed: 1960s–present

Louisiana Highway 3079 (LA 3079) runs 1.08 miles (1.74 km) in an east–west direction from LA 593 to LA 138 north of Collinston, Morehouse Parish. The short connector is an undivided two-lane highway for its entire length.

The entire route is in Morehouse Parish.

mi	km	Destinations	Notes
0.0	0.0	LA 593	Western terminus
1.1	1.8	LA 138	Eastern terminus
1.000 mi = 1.609 km; 1.000 km = 0.621 mi

== Louisiana Highway 3081 ==
Louisiana Highway 3081
- Location: Pearl River
- Length: 2.17 mi (3.49 km)
- Existed: 1965–present

Louisiana Highway 3081 (LA 3081) is a state highway in Louisiana that serves St. Tammany Parish. It spans a total of 2.2 miles (3.5 km) largely over a former alignment of both U.S. 11 and U.S. 90 in the town of Pearl River.

== Louisiana Highway 3082 ==
Louisiana Highway 3082
- Location: New Orleans–Chalmette
- Length: 6.2 mi (10.0 km)
- Existed: 1962–1967

Louisiana Highway 3082 (LA 3082) was a state highway in Louisiana that served Orleans and St. Bernard Parishes. It spanned 6.2 miles (10.0 km) in a west–east direction along the present route of LA 39 between New Orleans and Chalmette. It was essentially a temporary designation for the relocation of LA 39 north (west) of LA 47.

== Louisiana Highway 3083 ==
Louisiana Highway 3083
- Location: Coteau Holmes
- Length: 3.98 mi (6.41 km)

Louisiana Highway 3083 (LA 3083) runs 3.98 miles (6.41 km) in Coteau Holmes.

== Louisiana Highway 3086 ==
Louisiana Highway 3086
- Location: Jefferson Davis Parish
- Length: 7.05 mi (11.35 km)

Louisiana Highway 3086 (LA 3086) runs 7.05 miles (11.35 km) in Jefferson Davis Parish.

== Louisiana Highway 3087 ==
Louisiana Highway 3087
- Location: Houma–Savoie
- Length: 5.03 mi (8.10 km)
- Existed: 1968–present

Louisiana Highway 3087 (LA 3087) runs 5.03 miles (8.10 km) in a north–south direction from LA 24 in Houma, Terrebonne Parish to LA 182 in Savoie, Lafourche Parish.

From the south, LA 3087 begins at an intersection with LA 24 at the northern limit of Houma. It heads north as an undivided four-lane highway and immediately crosses a vertical lift bridge over Bayou Terrebonne, intersecting LA 659 on the opposite bank. LA 3087 continues north along Prospect Boulevard, becoming a divided four-lane highway, and crosses a high-level fixed span bridge over the Gulf Intracoastal Waterway. Shortly after an intersection with LA 660, the highway crosses from Terrebonne Parish into Lafourche Parish at LA 316. LA 3087 then turns northwest and reaches its northern terminus at LA 182 in an area known as Savoie.

Parish	Location	mi	km	Destinations	Notes
Terrebonne	Houma	0.0	0.0	LA 24 (East Main Street) – Thibodaux, Larose	Southern terminus
Terrebonne	Houma	0.0	0.0	Bridge over Bayou Terrebonne	
Terrebonne		0.1	0.16	LA 659 (East Park Avenue)	
Terrebonne		0.7	1.1	Bridge over Gulf Intracoastal Waterway	
Terrebonne		1.4	2.3	LA 660 (Coteau Road) – Bayou Cane	
Terrebonne–Lafourche parish line		1.9	3.1	LA 316 (Bayou Blue Road) – Gray, Bourg	
Lafourche	Savoie	5.0	8.0	LA 182 – Houma, New Orleans	Northern terminus
1.000 mi = 1.609 km; 1.000 km = 0.621 mi

== Louisiana Highway 3089 ==
Louisiana Highway 3089
- Location: Donaldsonville
- Length: 2.78 mi (4.47 km)
- Existed: 1964–present

Louisiana Highway 3089 (LA 3089) runs 2.78 miles (4.47 km) in an east–west direction from the junction of LA 1 and LA 18 in Donaldsonville, Ascension Parish to LA 70 east of town. The route connects Donaldsonville with the Sunshine Bridge across the Mississippi River on LA 70.

From the west, LA 3089 heads east on Albert Street from LA 1 and LA 18 as an undivided two-lane highway with a center turning lane. The route immediately crosses a bridge over Bayou Lafourche and intersects LA 308 on the opposite bank. After curving onto Marchand Drive, LA 3089 intersects LA 945 (St. Patrick Street). Continuing east along the Union Pacific Railroad (UP) tracks, the surroundings abruptly become rural, and the highway widens to a divided four-lane highway. Just after leaving the city limits, LA 3089 ends at a sprawling interchange with LA 70 where all movements are made at grade. LA 70 continues into St. James Parish and across the Sunshine Bridge.

LA 3089 was originally the designation for the Sunshine Bridge and its approaches upon its opening to traffic in 1964. At this time, traffic heading east out of Donaldsonville reached the bridge by following LA 18 along the east bank levee of the Mississippi River, turning southeast onto what is now LA 3120, then east onto the present LA 70 across the bridge. Upon reaching the east bank, traffic exited immediately onto ramps leading to LA 44, the east bank River Road. Traffic bound for Sorrento would turn northeast onto a portion of LA 942 that is no longer part of the state highway system and continue straight ahead onto LA 22. The east bank approach was extended directly to LA 22 near Sorrento around 1969. By 1975, the west bank approach was re-routed and extended into the center of Donaldsonville. During the late 1970s, LA 70 was extended northeast to LA 3089 from its original terminus at LA 1 in Paincourtville. The LA 70 designation was then extended across the Sunshine Bridge to LA 22, shortening LA 3089 to its present length.

The entire highway is in Ascension Parish.

Location	mi	km	Destinations	Notes
Donaldsonville	0.0	0.0	LA 1 – Baton Rouge; LA 18 (Veterans Boulevard)	Western terminus of LA 18 and LA 3082
Donaldsonville	0.04	0.064	Bridge over Bayou Lafourche	
Donaldsonville	0.07	0.11	LA 308 (East Bayou Road)	Northern terminus of LA 308
Donaldsonville	0.4	0.64	LA 945 (St. Patrick Street)	Eastern terminus of LA 945
	2.2– 2.8	3.5– 4.5	LA 70 – Sunshine Bridge	Eastern terminus
1.000 mi = 1.609 km; 1.000 km = 0.621 mi

== Louisiana Highway 3090 ==
Louisiana Highway 3090
- Location: Port Fourchon
- Length: 3.47 mi (5.58 km)
- Existed: 1965–present

Louisiana Highway 3090 (LA 3090) runs 3.47 miles (5.58 km) in a north–south direction along A. O. Rappelet Road from Port Fourchon, Lafourche Parish to a junction with LA 1.

The route, located on the Gulf of Mexico, is vital to the area's oil/gas and seafood industries. The northern terminus is located opposite the south end of the Gateway to the Gulf Expressway on LA 1, the only link to the rest of the state highway system. LA 3090 is an undivided two-lane highway for its entire length.

The entire highway is in Lafourche Parish.

Location	mi	km	Destinations	Notes
Port Fourchon	0.0	0.0	Begin state maintenance at canal bridge on east side of Pass Fourchon	Southern terminus
	3.5	5.6	LA 1 – Grand Isle, Golden Meadow	Northern terminus
1.000 mi = 1.609 km; 1.000 km = 0.621 mi

== Louisiana Highway 3091 ==
Louisiana Highway 3091
- Location: West Baton Rouge Parish
- Length: 2.52 mi (4.06 km)
- Existed: 1960s–present

Louisiana Highway 3091 (LA 3091) runs 2.52 miles (4.06 km) in a general north–south direction from LA 620 to LA 413 north of Erwinville, West Baton Rouge Parish. The highway heads north from LA 620 then turns west, skirting the Pointe Coupee Parish line, to its terminus at LA 413.

== Louisiana Highway 3092 ==
Louisiana Highway 3092
- Location: Lake Charles
- Length: 6.42 mi (10.33 km)

Louisiana Highway 3092 (LA 3092) runs 6.42 miles (10.33 km) in Lake Charles.

== Louisiana Highway 3093 ==
Louisiana Highway 3093
- Location: Wright
- Length: 4.01 mi (6.45 km)

Louisiana Highway 3093 (LA 3093) runs 4.01 miles (6.45 km) in Wright, Vermillion Parish.

== Louisiana Highway 3094 ==
Louisiana Highway 3094
- Location: Shreveport
- Length: 3.99 mi (6.42 km)

Louisiana Highway 3094 (LA 3094) runs 3.99 miles (6.42 km) in Shreveport.

== Louisiana Highway 3096 ==
Louisiana Highway 3096
- Location: Evangeline Parish
- Length: 2.55 mi (4.10 km)

Louisiana Highway 3096 (LA 3096) runs 2.55 miles (4.10 km) in Evangeline Parish.

== Louisiana Highway 3097 ==
Louisiana Highway 3097
- Location: Ville Platte
- Length: 2.06 mi (3.32 km)

Louisiana Highway 3097 (LA 3097) runs 2.06 miles (3.32 km) in Ville Platte.

== Louisiana Highway 3098 ==
Louisiana Highway 3098
- Location: Georgetown
- Length: 3.91 mi (6.29 km)
- Existed: 1960s–present

Louisiana Highway 3098 (LA 3098) runs 3.91 miles (6.29 km) in a southeast to northwest direction from US 165 in Georgetown, Grant Parish to LA 1230 on the Winn Parish line.

The route initially heads north on a bypassed former alignment of US 165 through a forested area within the village of Georgetown. After 0.5 miles (0.80 km), the highway intersects LA 1230. Less than 1 mile (1.6 km) later, LA 3098 turns off to the northwest and passes near an area known as Rochelle. It proceeds to a second junction with LA 1230 on the Grant–Winn parish line. LA 3098 is an undivided two-lane highway for its entire length.

Parish	Location	mi	km	Destinations	Notes
Grant	Georgetown	0.0	0.0	US 165 south	Southern terminus
Grant	Georgetown	0.5	0.80	LA 1230	
Grant–Winn parish line		3.9	6.3	LA 1230	Northern terminus
1.000 mi = 1.609 km; 1.000 km = 0.621 mi

== Louisiana Highway 3099 ==
Louisiana Highway 3099
- Location: DeRidder
- Length: 2.88 mi (4.63 km)

Louisiana Highway 3099 (LA 3099) runs 2.88 miles (4.63 km) in DeRidder.
