= KZWA =

Coordinates: 30.454°N 93.139°W

Moss Bluff, Louisiana; United States
- Broadcast area: Lake Charles metropolitan area
- Frequency: 104.9 MHz
- Branding: Live 104.9

Programming
- Format: Urban Adult Contemporary

Ownership
- Owner: B&C Broadcasting Ltd

History
- First air date: 1995; 31 years ago

Technical information
- Licensing authority: FCC
- Class: C3
- ERP: 25,000 watts
- HAAT: 100 meters (330 ft)

Links
- Public license information: Public file; LMS
- Website: www.kzwafm.com

KZWA (104.9 FM, branded as "Live 104.9") is an American radio station broadcasting an Urban Adult Contemporary format serving Lake Charles, Louisiana and licensed to Moss Bluff, Louisiana, United States. The station is currently owned by and licensed to B&C Broadcasting Ltd. The station's studios are located at the intersection of Enterprise Boulevard and I-10 just east of downtown Lake Charles, and its transmitter is southeast of Ragley, Louisiana.

== History ==
The construction permit that would become KZWA was requested in 1988 (BPH-19880602NO). It was granted on March 22, 1992. The station was licensed to Lake Charles, LA. The permit was transferred to the current ownership on November 23, 1992. The permit was extended a few times, and the facility tweaked. The station filed for a license to cover its construction permit (BLH 19940802KB) in April 1994. This was granted on June 22, 1995. The original facility was a class C2 with 50,000 watts at 150 meters (492'). A Continental Transmitter fed three inch coaxial line into a four bay Shiveley antenna. The station had a directional antenna located on a tower southwest of Lake Charles. The station was listenable in Lake Charles, LA as well as in the eastern portions of the Beaumont-Orange-Port Arthur area as "Live Vibe 105".

In 1999 the licensee of a Houston, Texas, area station conceived of a plan to upgrade their station. It required moving several stations (including KZWA) to new frequencies and locations. An agreement was made with the owner of KZWA to file for and relocate to a new site near Ragley, LA. The changed facility was on 104.9 MHz, licensed to Moss Bluff, Louisiana, (the FCC had a policy of encouraging changes that led to creation of "first local service" signals) with power of 25,000 watts at 100 meters (328'). As part of the agreement the benefiting party (Tichenor License Corporation in Houston) paid for the new site, site preparation, power line access, a building, tower, lines and antennas and new microwave equipment to link the studio feed to the tower site. Once the new site was on air, pieces of equipment from the old site (transmitter, line, antenna, STL dish, STL receiver, and more) were moved to the Ragley site so that KZWA had two of most all equipment.

== Notable DJ ==
- Rob Redding

Tony Woods
