= Louisiana Highway 111 =

State highway in Louisiana, United States

Louisiana Highway 111

- Route of LA 111 highlighted in red

Route information
- Maintained by Louisiana DOTD
- Length: 45.722 mi (73.582 km)
- Existed: 1955 renumbering–present
- Tourist routes: Louisiana Scenic Byway: Myths and Legends Byway

Major junctions
- South end: US 190 in Junction
- LA 8 in Burr Ferry; US 171 in Anacoco
- North end: LA 117 northeast of Leesville

Location
- Country: United States
- State: Louisiana
- Parishes: Beauregard, Vernon

Highway system
- Louisiana State Highway System; Interstate; US; State; Scenic
| ← LA 110 | → LA 112 |

Louisiana Highway 111 (LA 111) is a state highway located in western Louisiana. It runs 45.72 miles (73.58 km) in a general north–south direction from U.S. Highway 190 (US 190) in Junction to LA 117 northeast of Leesville.

The route parallels the Texas state line, located along the Sabine River, from a point north of Merryville to the south end of the Toledo Bend Reservoir. Its direction then changes from north–south to east–west as it bends around the northwest side of the Leesville area, though this is not reflected on its directional banners. During this stretch, the highway crosses Vernon Lake and passes through the village of Anacoco, where it intersects US 171. A lightly traveled rural route, LA 111 also provides access to the Toledo Bend Dam and South Toledo Bend State Park.

LA 111 was designated in the 1955 Louisiana Highway renumbering, replacing a small portion of former State Route 143, which consisted of several disconnected roadways that paralleled the Sabine River between Starks and Logansport. LA 111 also replaced most of State Route 138 and all of State Route 414, which existed on either side of Anacoco.

== Route description ==
From the south, LA 111 begins at a junction with US 190 in Junction, a small community located in the northwest corner of Beauregard Parish. US 190 connects with Merryville to the south and DeRidder to the east. LA 111 heads north and crosses a bridge over Bayou Anacoco, simultaneously entering Vernon Parish. Shortly afterward, LA 464 begins, splitting off to the northeast. Over the next 13 miles (21 km), LA 111 continues through a sparsely populated pine forest with small clusters of residences visible at points such as Almadane and Evans. It then reaches a T-intersection with LA 8 (Nolan Trace Parkway) at Burr Ferry, located less than two miles (3.2 km) from the Texas state line at the Sabine River.

LA 111 turns east briefly onto LA 8 before resuming its northern trajectory, while LA 8 continues ahead toward the city of Leesville. LA 111 proceeds north for 9.4 miles (15.1 km) before reaching another T-intersection with LA 392, which leads to the Toledo Bend Dam and South Toledo Bend State Park. LA 111 turns east, forming a longer concurrency with LA 392. The highway permanently changes its direction from north–south to east–west, although the directional banners on its signage remain the same. Five miles (8.0 km) later, LA 392 turns to the north toward Hornbeck, while LA 111 continues straight ahead and crosses two short bridges over Vernon Lake.

Soon afterward, the highway enters the village of Anacoco, where it becomes known as Port Arthur Avenue. In the center of town, LA 111 crosses the Kansas City Southern Railway (KCS) tracks and the four-lane US 171 (Main Street) in quick succession. The route continues 8.8 miles (14.2 km) further to its terminus at a T-intersection with LA 117 between Leesville and Kurthwood.

=== Route classification and data ===
LA 111 is an undivided two-lane highway for its entire length. It is classified as a rural major collector by the Louisiana Department of Transportation and Development (La DOTD). Daily traffic volume in 2013 peaked at 2,500 vehicles between LA 392 north and Anacoco. A low count of 520 vehicles was reported east of the village and extending to LA 117. The posted speed limit is generally 55 mph (90 km/h) but is reduced to 35 mph (55 km/h) in Anacoco.

=== Louisiana Scenic Byway ===
The portion of LA 111 south of Burr Ferry is part of the Myths and Legends Byway in the state-designated system of tourist routes known as the Louisiana Scenic Byways.

== History ==
In the original Louisiana Highway system in use prior to 1955, LA 111 was part of three different routes. The north–south portion was a small part of State Route 143, a designation which encompassed several disconnected roadways running parallel to the Sabine River between Starks and Logansport. The east–west section made up the majority of State Route 138 as far as Anacoco then continued east of town as State Route 414. These routes were designated in two acts of the state legislature in 1926 and 1928, adding to the original 98 routes defined in 1921.

The modern LA 111 was created in 1955 when the Louisiana Department of Highways renumbered the entire state highway system.

Class "B": La 111—From a junction with La-US 190 at or near Junction through or near Evans to a junction with La 8 at or near Burr Ferry.
Class "C": La 111—From a junction with La 8 at or near Burr Ferry through or near Haddins Ferry and Anacoco to a junction with La 117 north of Leesville.

— 1955 legislative route description

With the 1955 renumbering, the state highway department initially categorized all routes into three classes: "A" (primary), "B" (secondary), and "C" (farm-to-market). This system has since been updated and replaced by a more specific functional classification system.

Only a few minor changes have been made to the route over the years, mostly in connection with bridge replacements. The impoundment of Anacoco Creek in 1963 necessitated the construction of two new bridges across what was now the wider Vernon Lake. The bridges were constructed in 1966 just north of the former creek crossing and allowed a slight straightening of the roadway at that point. In 1992, the replacement of a bridge across Mill Creek at Almadane led to a curve in the roadway being bypassed there. In the late 1990s, a portion of LA 111 heading into Anacoco was relocated, eliminating several zigzags and a right-angle turn next to the KCS Railway grade crossing. The route originally made four right-angle turns as it followed Trigger Trap Road, West Street, and Front Street through town.

== Major intersections ==
| Parish | Location | mi | km | Destinations | Notes |
|---|---|---|---|---|---|
| Beauregard | Junction | 0.000– 0.022 | 0.000– 0.035 | US 190 – Merryville, DeRidder | Southern terminus |
| Vernon | | 2.973 | 4.785 | LA 464 north | Southern terminus of LA 464 |
| Vernon | Burr Ferry | 16.303 | 26.237 | LA 8 west (Nolan Trace Parkway) – Jasper | South end of LA 8 concurrency |
| Vernon | Burr Ferry | 16.833 | 27.090 | LA 8 east (Nolan Trace Parkway) – Leesville | North end of LA 8 concurrency |
| Vernon | | 26.199 | 42.163 | LA 392 west – Toledo Bend Dam | South end of LA 392 concurrency; to South Toledo Bend State Park |
| Vernon | | 31.370 | 50.485 | LA 392 east – Hornbeck | North end of LA 392 concurrency |
| Vernon | Anacoco | 36.913 | 59.406 | US 171 (Main Street) – Leesville, Many | |
| Vernon | | 45.722 | 73.582 | LA 117 – Leesville, Kurthwood | Northern terminus |
1.000 mi = 1.609 km; 1.000 km = 0.621 mi: Concurrency terminus
