= Almadane, Louisiana =

Unincorporated community in Louisiana

- Unincorporated community
- Location within Louisiana Location within the United States
- Coordinates: 30°56′31″N 93°30′18″W
- Country: United States
- State: Louisiana
- Parish: Vernon
- Elevation: 108 ft (33 m)
- Time zone: UTC-6 (Central (CST))
  - Summer (DST): UTC-5 (CDT)
- Postal Code: 70639
- Area code: 337
- GNIS feature ID: 542921
- FIPS code: 22-01480

Almadane is an unincorporated community in Vernon Parish, Louisiana, United States. The community is located 3 miles (4.8 kilometres) to the south of Evans and 13 miles (21 kilometres) west of Rosepine on the western edge of Clear Creek Wildlife Management Area on the scenic Myths and Legends Byway.

== Etymology ==
When the community was founded the first postmaster Daniel R. Knight needed to give the community a name. He decided to use his name combined the names of two other citizens. The names of the three men, Al Damereal, Mann Huddleston and Daniel R. Knight became Al-ma-dan. The postmaster added an e to the end of the newly formed name and submitted the paperwork to the United States Post Office and it was accepted.

== History ==
The settlement of Almadane was chosen due to the location on the Sabine River where it was possible for residents to send and receive goods by steamboat. The local lumber mills also made use of the river. They cut down nearby trees and hauled them to "Nacoco" Creek to be "rafted" and floated to the sawmills at Orange, Texas. Early travel in Vernon Parish was very difficult and there were very few roads. There were many simple trails around the community. It was very difficult for farmers to travel to the local markets for buying and selling goods.

== Early 20th century ==
After the turn of the century Capt. Samuel Allardyce moved to the community to manage the general store, cotton gin, grist mill, and the sawmill. In the 1920s the railroad replaced the steamboat as the most viable way to transport goods, the sawmills were closed, and many residents moved away to find work. The Almadane Plantation dog-trot house still marks the spot, nestled among a grove of centuries-old live oak trees. Today the old home is no longer on Louisiana Highway 111 passing through the site. The Almadane Cemetery for black workers is located very near the river which once served as a major transportation route for the entire area.
