= Texas Oilman's Bass Invitational =

Fishing tournament in Texas, US

Texas Oilman's Bass Invitational (TOBI) is a non-profit organization primarily made up of members who work in, or are retired from, the exploration, production and/or servicing of oil and gas wells throughout the Texas and Louisiana Gulf Coast. The organization supports charitable organizations including Texas Children's Hospital.

== Annual fishing tournament ==
TOBI was founded in 1990 and its 19th annual fishing tournament was held on 13–14 March 2009. The tournament was at Lake Toledo Bend at Cypress Bend Park. In 2006, the tournament was exceptionally held at Lake Sam Rayburn because of the unfavorable water levels at Toledo Bend.

=== 2009 tournament ===
More than 1,200 amateur anglers participated in the 2009 tournament. Proceeds from the event were primarily contributed to Texas Children's Hospital's Renal Unit. The money raised supports patient care and research in pediatric kidney and urinary tract diseases and disorders. In 2008, $175,000 was raised from the bass fishing tournament. The contributions comprise the proceeds of tournament entry fees – paid by usually more than 500 fishermen – and sponsorships.

== Texas Children's Hospital fishing event ==
In addition to the financial contributions to the hospital, TOBI has an annual fishing event for children receiving care at Texas Children’s Hospital.
