= North Toledo Bend State Park =

State park in Louisiana, United States

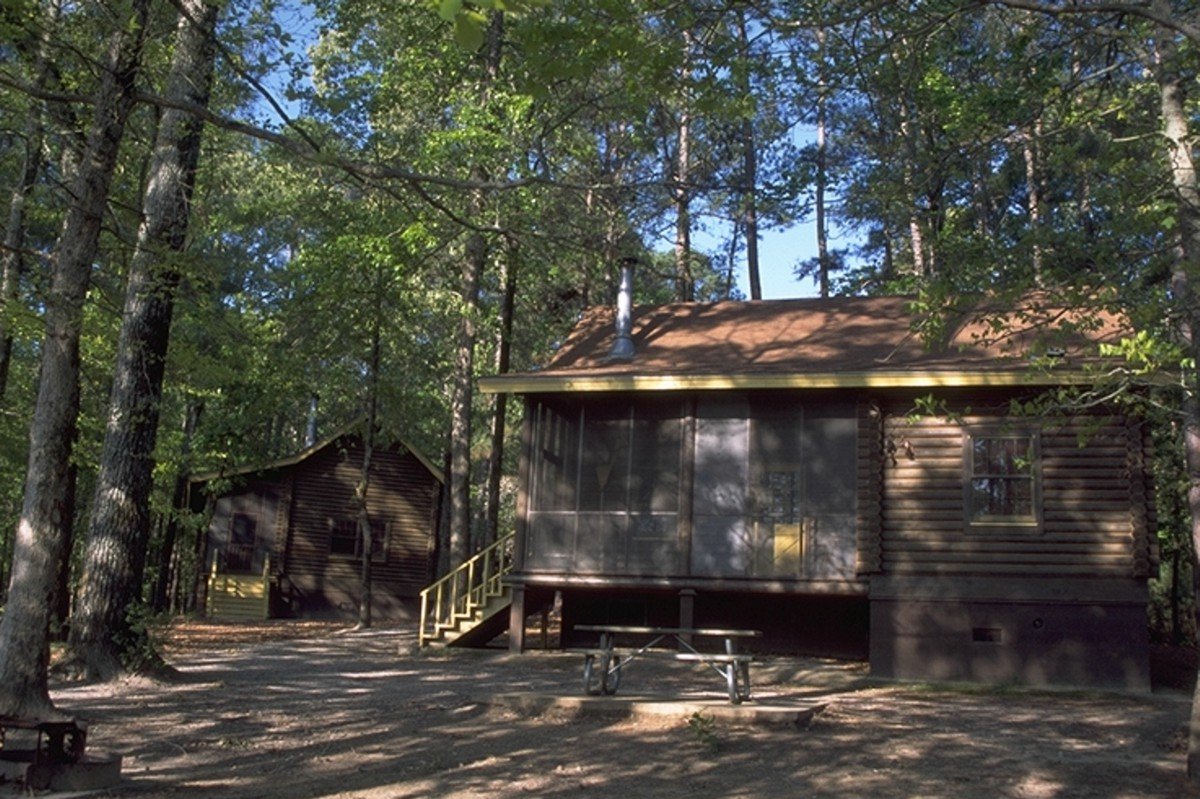
- Cabin at the park

- Location within Louisiana
- Location: Sabine Parish, Louisiana, United States of America
- Coordinates: 31°32′53″N 93°43′59″W
- Area: 900 acres (3.6 km^{2}; 1.4 sq mi)
- Established: 1987
- Visitors: 41,631 (in 2022)
- Governing body: Louisiana Office of State Parks
- Website: www.crt.state.la.us/parks/intoledo.aspx

North Toledo Bend State Park is one of two Louisiana State Parks located on the shores of Toledo Bend Reservoir. The park, which is over 900 acres (3.6 km^{2}) in size, is located west of the town of Zwolle, Louisiana at the end of La. Hwy. 3229.

== Activities ==
Like most Louisiana state parks, entrance fees are $3 per person. Boating is especially popular on Toledo Bend and guests often use a boat launch where paddleboats or canoes may be rented to fish in the nationally acclaimed reservoir. Fisherman may use a fish cleaning station on site.

There are 10 cabins and 67 campsites on the Park grounds for campers. Hikers is promoted at the park via two trails. Trail A is 1.5 miles (2.4 km) and Trail B is 4 miles (6.4 km).

The park's visitor center complex contains a large meeting room which can be reserved for group functions and an Olympic-size swimming pool.

There is a group camp available with 5 dorms that sleep 50 people each in bunk beds. It includes a full-size cafeteria-style kitchen with an industrial size oven, refrigerator, cooking implements, and serving line.

A bath house and restroom facilities are located centrally in the group camp, which also features a fishing pier.

== See also ==
- South Toledo Bend State Park
