= Mansfield State Historic Site =

Battlefield in Louisiana, United States

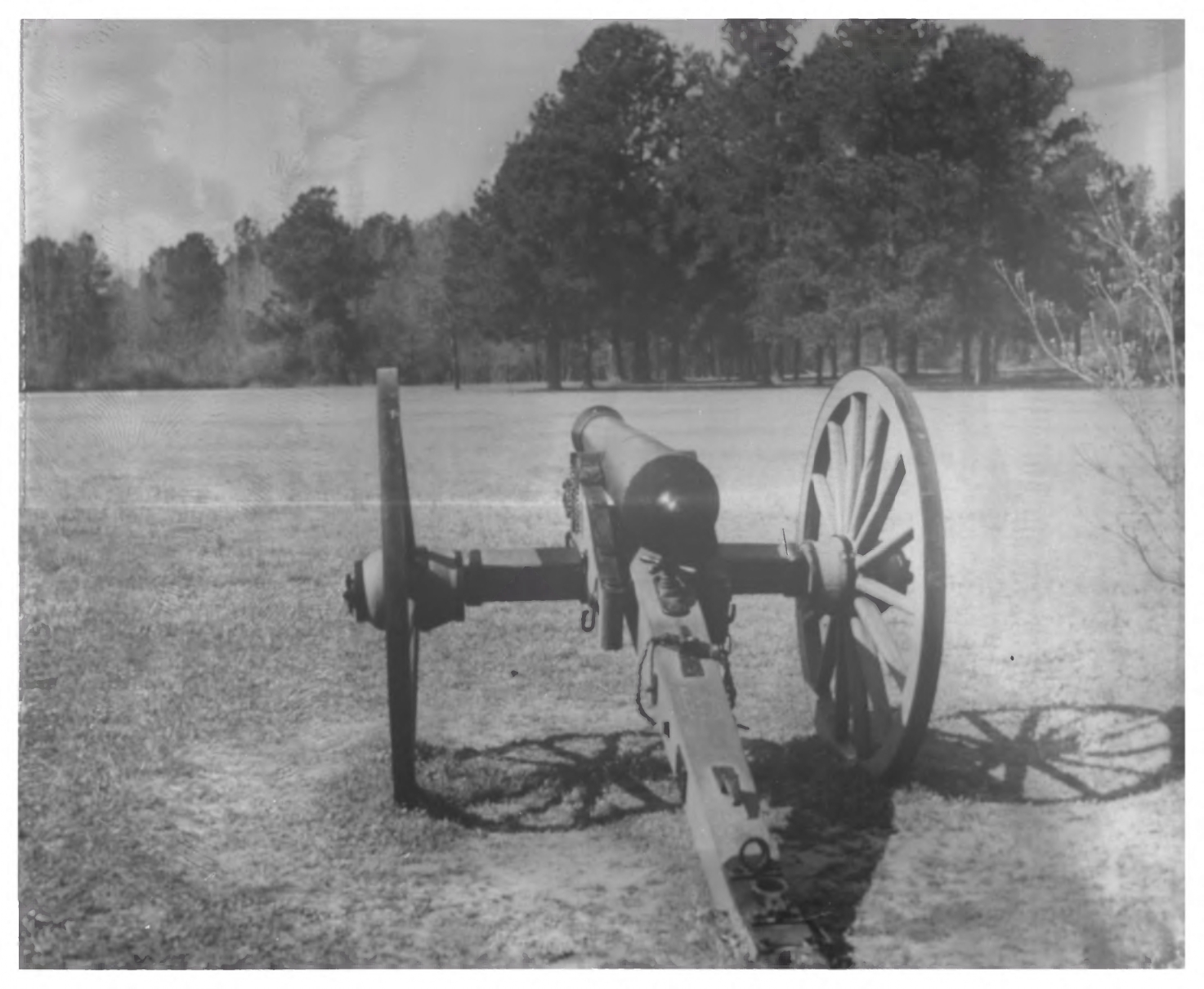

- Location in Louisiana
- 32°0′39.28″N 93°39′53.93″W
- Location: DeSoto Parish, Louisiana
- Nearest city: Mansfield, Louisiana

History
- Established: 1924 (102 years ago)
- Original use: Field, forest, battlefield

Site notes
- Area: 4 acres (1.6 ha)
- Governing body: Louisiana State Parks
- Website: Official website

U.S. National Register of Historic Places
- Official name: Mansfield Battle Park
- Designated: April 13, 1973
- Reference no.: 73002131

The Mansfield State Historic Site, also known as the Mansfield Battlefield, is a battlefield in DeSoto Parish, Louisiana. The Louisiana state historic site commemorates the Battle of Mansfield fought on Friday, April 8, 1864, during the Red River Campaign of the American Civil War. The site was listed in the U.S. National Register of Historic Places as the Mansfield Battle Park in 1973. Established in 1924 by the United Daughters of the Confederacy, the site was transferred to the state of Louisiana in 1954.

== Background ==
In early 1864, during the American Civil War, Union leadership planned a joint Army-Navy drive up the Red River of the South in Confederate-held Louisiana. The planned campaign had both political, economic, and strategic goals. It was hoped that Union military presence in the area would prevent collaboration between the Confederacy and the French, who had begun intervening in Mexico; expand Union political control in the region; and provide cotton, at that time a valuable commodity, to business interests in New England. The planned expedition, which became known as the Red River campaign, began in March 1864. The army elements were commanded by Major General Nathaniel P. Banks, while the naval elements were led by Rear Admiral David Dixon Porter. To the north, in Arkansas, the Camden expedition was intended to cooperate with the Red River campaign. Outnumbered, Confederate forces commanded by Major General Richard Taylor withdrew upriver towards the Confederate administrative capital of Shreveport, Louisiana.

Taylor halted his men near the community of Mansfield, Louisiana, in early April. He felt that Mansfield was a good place to make a stand, as Banks's men would be forced to approach the area on a single road, while multiple roads would be available between Mansfield and Shreveport, including one that could be protected by the Union naval fleet. On April 8, Taylor arrayed his forces along a clearing near the road leading to Mansfield from the southeast. Leading elements of Banks's army made contact with the Confederates and deployed into an angled line, setting the stage for the Battle of Mansfield. Taylor ordered an assault at around 4:00 pm, and the Confederate forces attacked over the clearing, suffering heavy casualties in the process. The first Union line was driven back, as was a second one about 0.5 miles (0.80 km) further back. A Union wagon train was captured, and the Confederates drove on to a third Union line, which was 3 miles (4.8 km) from the first Union line. This line was driven back slightly but held to nightfall. Banks's men withdrew from the field at night.

April 9 saw Taylor attack Banks again, in the Battle of Pleasant Hill. The Confederate attacks at Pleasant Hill were blunted, and while modern historians usually consider Pleasant Hill a Union victory, Banks continued to retreat. The Union forces continued to withdraw, pursued by some of Taylor's men, but Banks's army and Porter's fleet were able to escape. The Red River campaign was a Union failure and prevented the Union from sending troops to other regions, and postponed a planned assault on Mobile, Alabama, which in turned freed up other Confederate troops. The Camden expedition likewise ended in failure.

== Description and administrative history ==
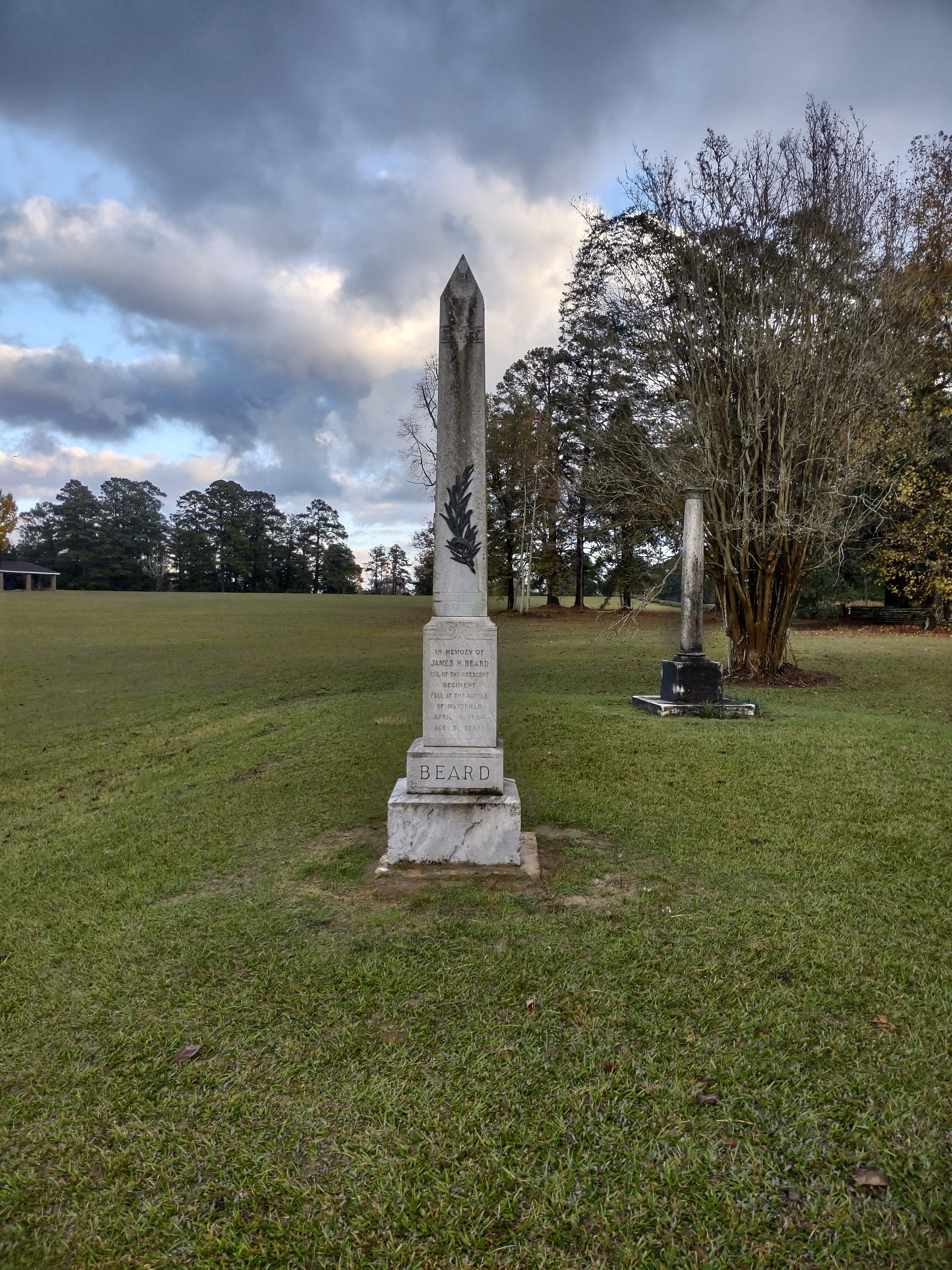
The James H. Beard Monument commemorates the colonel of the Crescent Regiment who was killed at the Battle of Mansfield on April 8, 1864.

In 1924, 4 acres (1.6 ha) of the battlefield were donated to the United Daughters of the Confederacy (UDC) for a memorial park. The next year, a monument to the Prince de Polignac, a Confederate officer, was erected at the site. This was the first monument at the site. That same year, state congressman W. H. Farmer introduced legislation to provide $5,000 of state funds for the site. Governor of Louisiana Henry L. Fuqua signed Farmer's bill into law in July. In 1928, work on a $1,000 archway at the park was begun. By 1929, the site had become a place for local youth to go and engage in petting.

The Works Progress Administration performed work at the site in 1936 and 1937. In 1939, ceremonies, including a luncheon and a tree-planting, were held at the park for the 75th anniversary of the battle. 1954 saw maintenance of the site transfers from the UDC to the Louisiana state government. By that time, the UDC had expanded the park to 44 acres (18 ha), and three additional monuments (to Taylor and two Confederate officers killed in the battle) had been placed. Funding issues had resulted in the UDC being unable to provide their desired level of maintenance, and attempts to make the site a national park had failed. The state allocated additional funds for a museum, and surveying for the museum site began the next year. The museum was dedicated in 1957. In 1964, festivities, to involve people from both Louisiana and Texas, were planned for the 100th anniversary of the battle. That same year, another marker, this one honoring Texas troops who fought in the battle, was erected at the site.

In 1972, a scale model of a monument at Gettysburg National Military Park commemorating Louisiana Confederate soldiers was erected at the Mansfield park. On April 13, 1973, the site was listed on the National Register of Historic Places as the Mansfield Battle Park. By 1982, there were seven Confederate monuments at the park. For a period during 1986 and 1987, the site was closed due to state budgetary issues.

In 2001, the Civil War Preservation Trust listed Mansfield, where the state acreage had grown to 177 acres (72 ha) as one of the 10 most endangered Civil War battlefield sites. By 2006, the battlefield had been dropped from the endangered list. The park's first new monument in decades was added in 2010. It honored Louisiana Confederate troops and was paid for by the Sons of Confederate Veterans and the UDC. Renovations at the park occurred in 2012. As of 2023, the site contains 0.75 miles (1.21 km) of trails, in addition to the museum. Living history events, such as musket demonstrations and soldier's gear talks, as well as other activities are sometimes held at the park.

== Sources ==
- Bergeron, Arthur W. (1998). "Mansfield, Louisiana". In Kennedy, Frances H. (ed.). The Civil War Battlefield Guide (2nd ed.). Boston/New York: Houghton Mifflin. pp. 267–269. ISBN 978-0-395-74012-5.
- Bergeron, Arthur W. (1998). "Pleasant Hill, Louisiana". In Kennedy, Frances H. (ed.). The Civil War Battlefield Guide (2nd ed.). Boston/New York: Houghton Mifflin. pp. 269–271. ISBN 978-0-395-74012-5.
- Johnson, Ludwell (1998). "Military Strategy, Politics, and Economics: The Red River Campaign". In Kennedy, Frances H. (ed.). The Civil War Battlefield Guide (2nd ed.). Boston/New York: Houghton Mifflin. pp. 265–266. ISBN 978-0-395-74012-5.
- Kennedy, Frances H., ed. (1998). The Civil War Battlefield Guide (2nd ed.). Boston/New York: Houghton Mifflin. ISBN 978-0-395-74012-5.
- Lowe, Richard (2004). Walker's Texas Division C.S.A.: Greyhounds of the Trans-Mississippi. Baton Rouge, Louisiana: Louisiana State University Press. ISBN 0-8071-3153-9.
