= Belmont, Louisiana =

- Unincorporated community and census-designated place
- Location within Louisiana Location within the United States
- Coordinates: 31°42′59″N 93°30′05″W
- Country: United States
- State: Louisiana
- Parish: Sabine

Area
  - Total: 10.03 sq mi (25.98 km^{2})
  - Land: 10.03 sq mi (25.98 km^{2})
  - Water: 0 sq mi (0.00 km^{2})
- Elevation: 351 ft (107 m)

Population (2020)
  - Total: 305
  - Density: 30.4/sq mi (11.74/km^{2})
- Time zone: UTC-6 (Central (CST))
  - Summer (DST): UTC-5 (CDT)
- Area code: 318
- GNIS feature ID: 2586667

Belmont is an unincorporated community and census-designated place in Sabine Parish, Louisiana, United States. As of the 2020 census, Belmont had a population of 305. The community is located at the junction of Louisiana highways 120 and 175.

== Geography ==
According to the U.S. Census Bureau, the community has an area of 10.031 square miles (25.98 km^{2}), all land.

== Demographics ==
Historical population
Census	Pop.	Note	%±
2010	361		—
2020	305		−15.5%
U.S. Decennial Census

Belmont first appeared as a census designated place in the 2010 U.S. census.
