= Crescent, Louisiana =

- Census-designated place
- Location within Louisiana Location within the United States
- Coordinates: 30°14′42″N 91°17′34″W
- Country: United States
- State: Louisiana
- Parish: Iberville

Area
  - Total: 1.71 sq mi (4.42 km^{2})
  - Land: 1.66 sq mi (4.31 km^{2})
  - Water: 0.042 sq mi (0.11 km^{2})
- Elevation: 7 ft (2.1 m)

Population (2020)
  - Total: 811
  - Density: 486.9/sq mi (187.98/km^{2})
- Time zone: UTC-6 (Central (CST))
  - Summer (DST): UTC-5 (CDT)
- Area code: 225
- GNIS feature ID: 2586675

Crescent is an unincorporated community and census-designated place in Iberville Parish, Louisiana, United States. It was first listed as a CDP in the 2010 Census with a population of 959. In 2020, its population was 811.

== Geography ==
Crescent is in central Iberville Parish, along Bayou Plaquemine 5 miles (8 km) southwest of Plaquemine, the parish seat. According to the U.S. Census Bureau, the Crescent CDP has an area of 1.707 square miles (4.42 km^{2}); 1.666 square miles (4.31 km^{2}) of its area is land, and 0.041 square miles (0.11 km^{2}) is water.

== Demographics ==
Historical population
Census	Pop.	Note	%±
2010	959		—
2020	811		−15.4%
U.S. Decennial Census

Crescent was first listed as a census designated place in the 2010 U.S. census. Its population was 959 at the 2010 census, and by 2020, its population declined to 811.

Crescent CDP, Louisiana – Racial and ethnic composition Note: the US census treats Hispanic/Latino as an ethnic category. This table excludes Latinos from the racial categories and assigns them to a separate category. Hispanics/Latinos may be of any race.
Race / Ethnicity (NH = Non-Hispanic)	Pop 2010	Pop 2020	% 2010	% 2020
White alone (NH)	579	508	60.38%	62.64%
Black or African American alone (NH)	354	260	36.91%	32.06%
Native American or Alaska Native alone (NH)	1	3	0.10%	0.37%
Asian alone (NH)	1	0	0.10%	0.00%
Pacific Islander alone (NH)	0	0	0.00%	0.00%
Some Other Race alone (NH)	0	1	0.00%	0.12%
Mixed Race or Multi-Racial (NH)	5	15	0.52%	1.85%
Hispanic or Latino (any race)	19	24	1.98%	2.96%
Total	959	811	100.00%	100.00%
