= South Toledo Bend State Park =

State park in Louisiana, United States

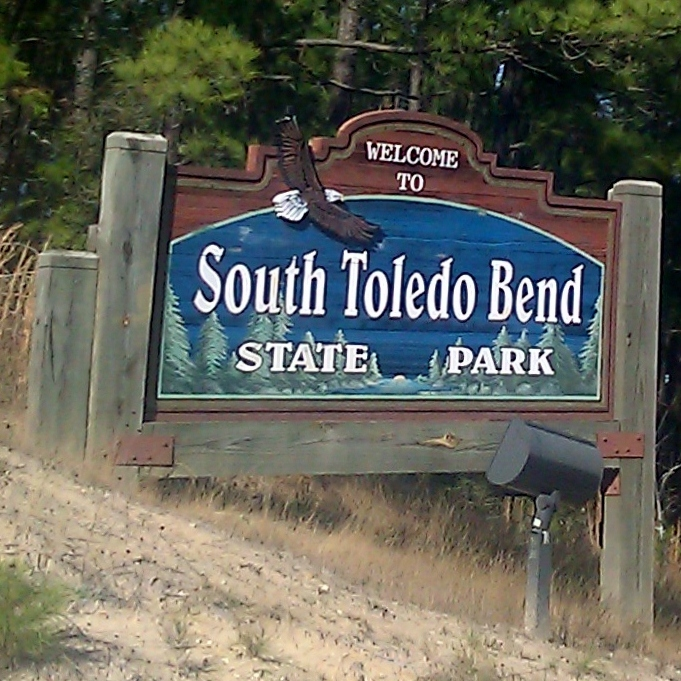

- Location within Louisiana
- Location: Vernon Parish, Louisiana, United States of America
- Coordinates: 31°12′29″N 93°34′12″W
- Area: approx. 1,000 acres (4.0 km^{2}; 1.6 sq mi)
- Established: November 20, 2004
- Visitors: 27,231 (in 2022)
- Governing body: Louisiana Office of State Parks
- Website: Official website

South Toledo Bend State Park is one of two Louisiana State Parks located on the shores of Toledo Bend Reservoir. The land for the park was acquired in 1979, but it was not opened to the public with facilities until November 20, 2004. The park, located at 120 Bald Eagle Road, in Anacoco, LA, quickly became popular due to its recreation potential.

== Activities ==
Visitors to the park can enjoy activities such as hiking, cycling, birding, camping, and wildlife watching. The park is 1,000 acres (4 km^{2}) in size, which gives visitors ample room to roam and hike. There is a 3,000 ft (900 m) surfaced nature trail which leads from the visitor center museum to the Hippie Point Hiking Trail, 1.5 miles (2 km) long. For those who want to stay overnight, the park provides 19 cabins, all located near the lake shoreline, and 60 campsites. There is a beach area for swimming, as well as boat rentals and a boat launch. The visitor center museum was opened on July 21, 2005. It contains nature-based exhibits and dioramas designed to increase awareness of indigenous species and their role in the environment.

The park is a nesting ground for the bald eagle which feeds on the freshwater fish. Fisherman may also catch the fish in the reservoir, including largemouth bass, catfish, bream, and white perch. There is a two-lane boat ramp in the park.

== Gallery ==
South Toledo Bend State Park
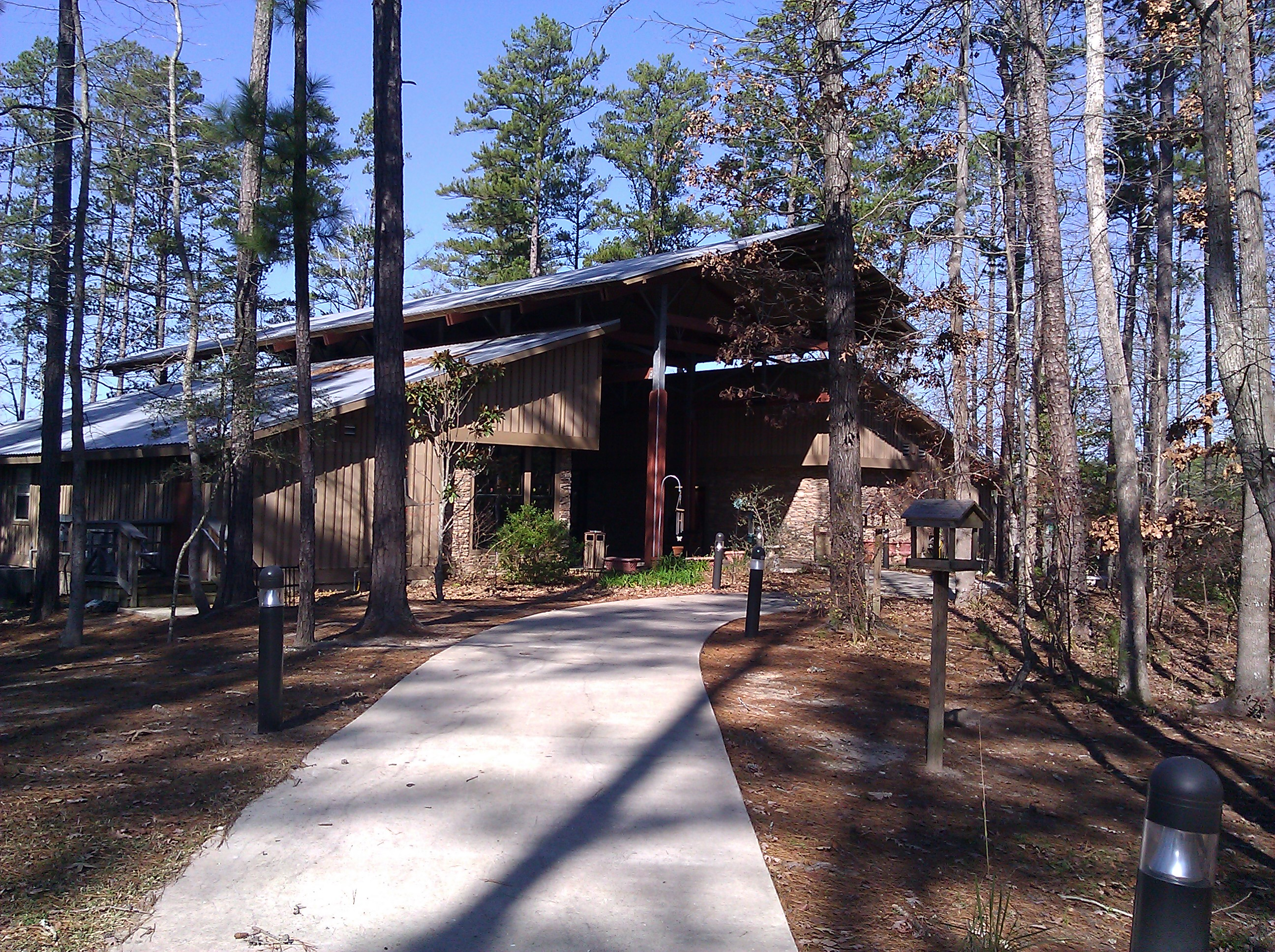
Visitor center located in the park

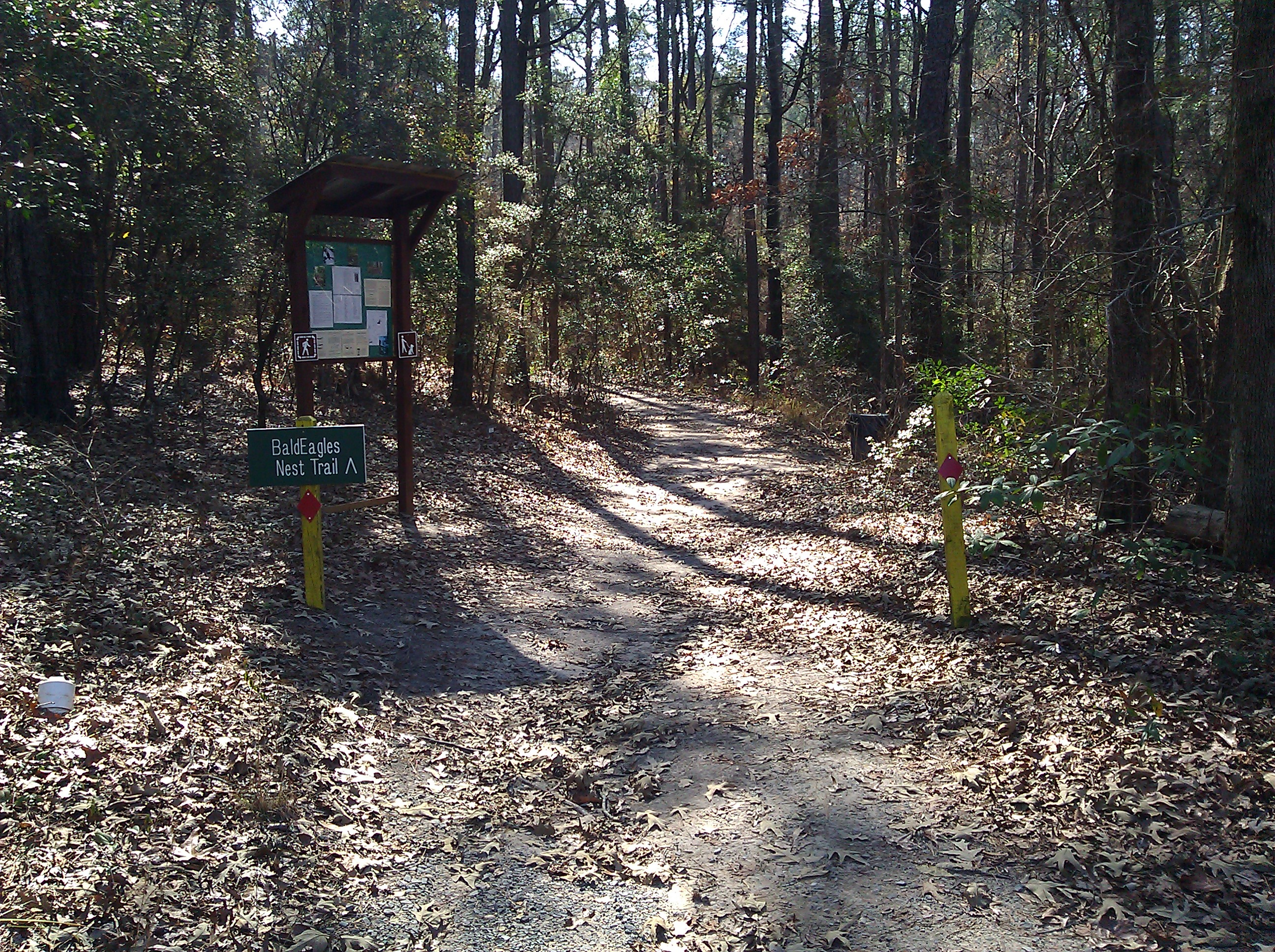
Entrance to the Bald Eagle Nest Trail

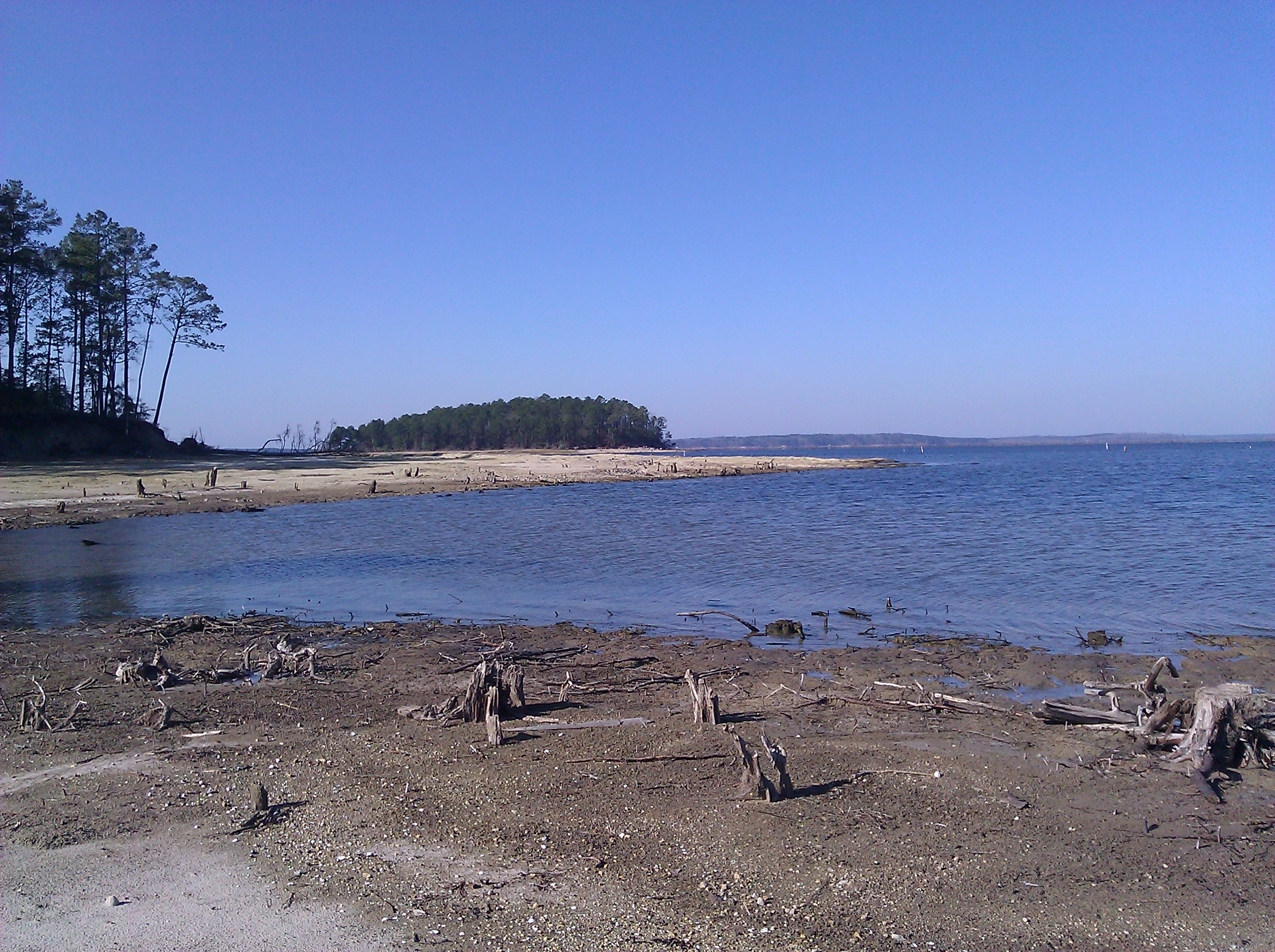
View from a campsite

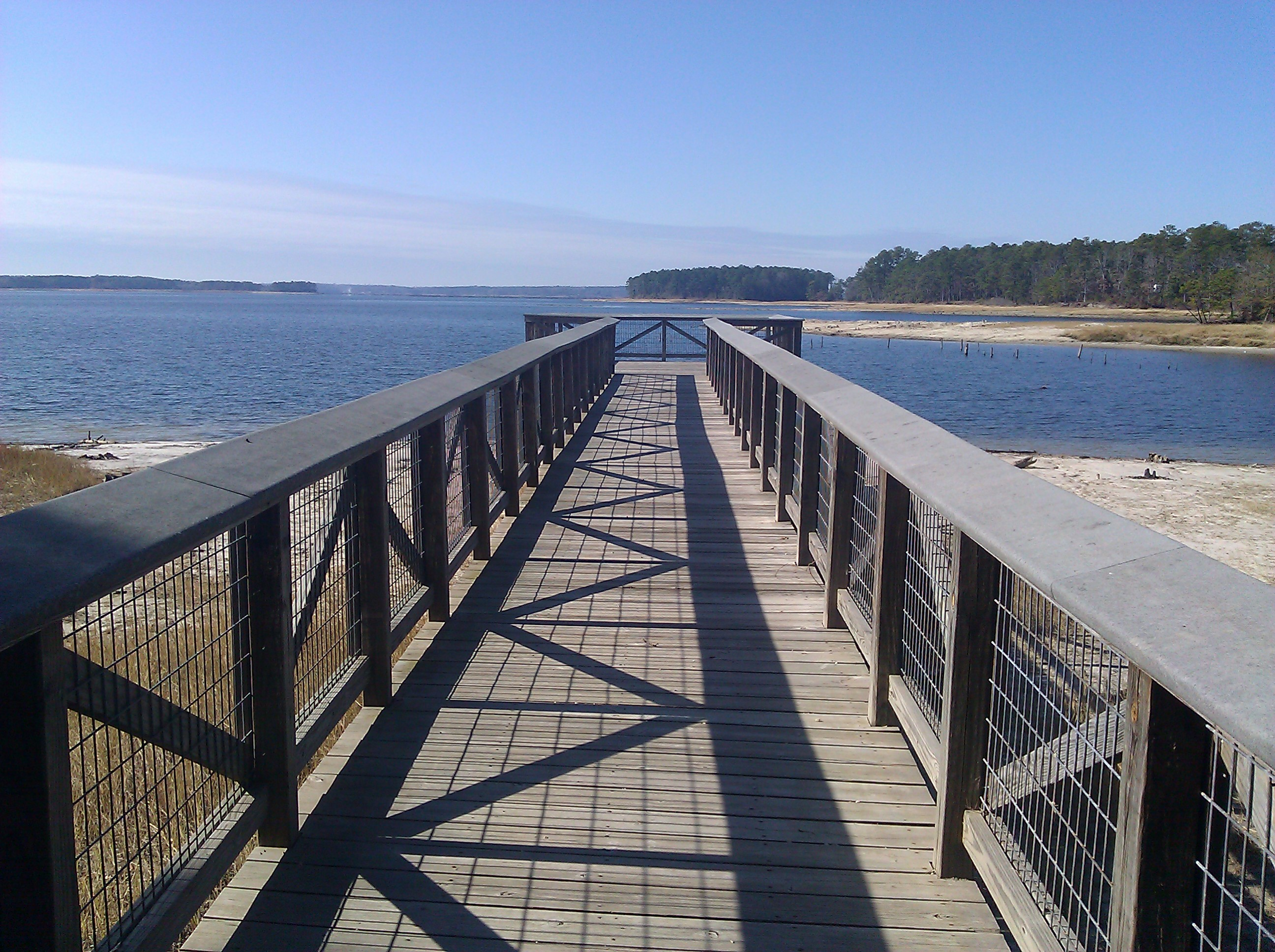
Pier near the Bald Eagle Nest Trail

== See also ==
- North Toledo Bend State Park
