= White Castle Ferry =

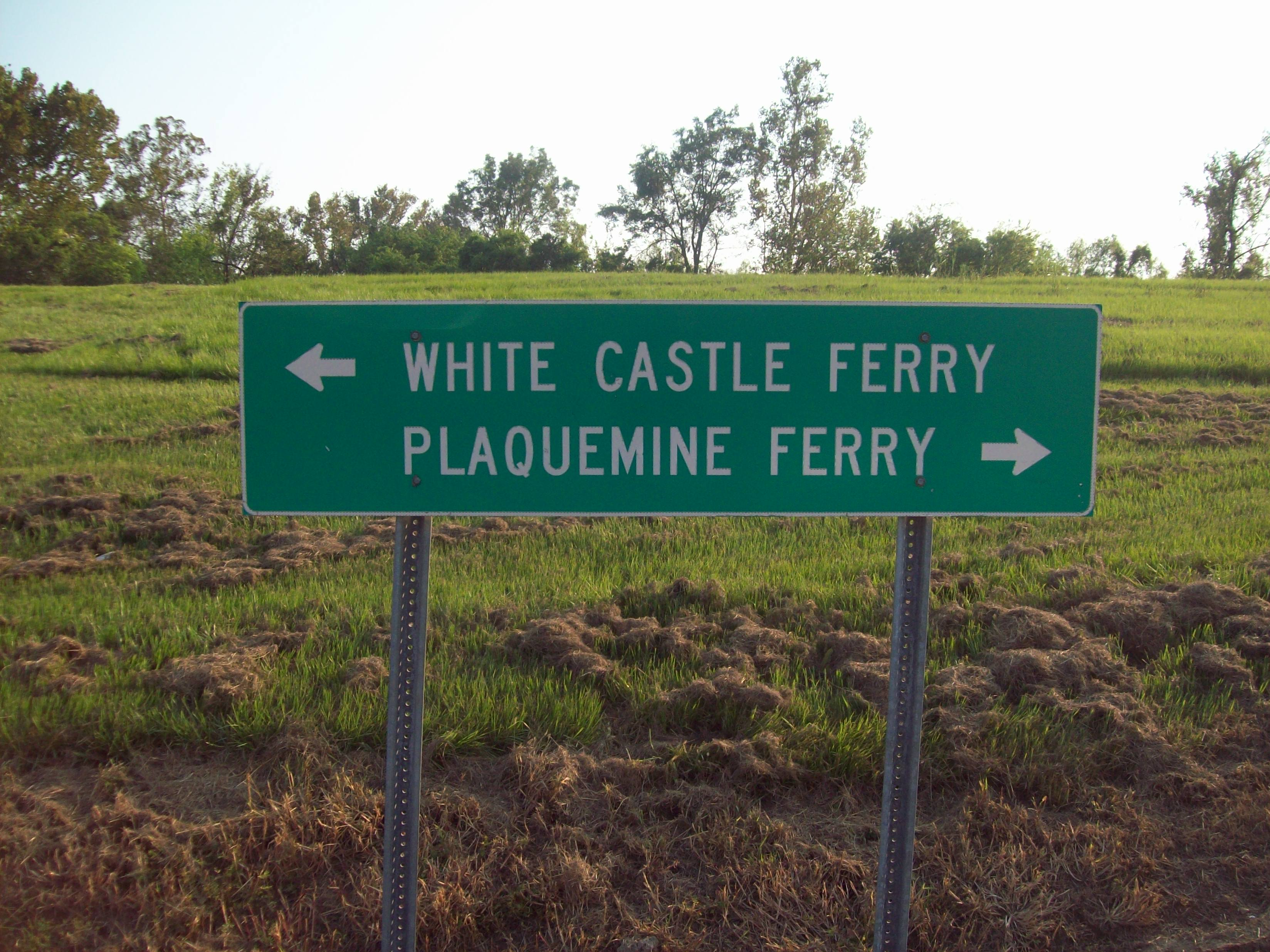
Sign showing the White Castle Ferry and Plaquemine Ferry

The White Castle Ferry was a ferry across the Mississippi River in the U.S. state of Louisiana, connecting White Castle and Carville. It was permanently closed in June 2013 due to state budget cuts.

== See also ==
- List of crossings of the Lower Mississippi River
