= Myths and Legends Byway =

The Myths and Legends Byway is a Louisiana Scenic Byway that follows several different state highways, primarily:

- LA 111 from Junction to Burr Ferry;
- LA 112 from DeRidder to Sugartown;
- LA 113 from east of DeRidder to Pitkin;
- US 165 and LA 26 from Kinder to DeRidder;
- US 171 and LA 10 from DeRidder to Oakdale; and
- US 190 from the Texas state line to DeRidder.
