= Ragley, Louisiana =

- Unincorporated community
- Location within Louisiana Location within the United States
- Coordinates: 30°30′46″N 93°13′57″W
- Country: United States
- State: Louisiana
- Parish: Beauregard
- Elevation: 92 ft (28 m)
- Time zone: UTC-6 (Central (CST))
  - Summer (DST): UTC-5 (CDT)
- ZIP code: 70657
- Area code: 337
- GNIS feature ID: 555751

Ragley is an unincorporated community in Beauregard Parish, Louisiana, United States. The community is located at the junction of U.S. routes 171 and 190, 20 miles (32 km) north of Lake Charles. Ragley has a post office with ZIP code 70657.

== History ==
Ragley began as a sawmill town that was built after the closing of the mill in Ragley, Texas (1900-1912). The owners of that mill were W. G. Ragley. Martin J. and Frank J. Ragley and A. H. Schluter. The mill in Louisiana was in production by 1915. The sawmill had a capacity of 110,000 ft. with electricity, a planing mill with a capacity of 100,000 ft., and twelve miles of track, with 52-lb. rails.

In 1935 construction began on the brick 10-room Hollingsworth School that was completed in 1937 by Works Progress Administration (WPA) workmen.

== Park and pond ==
The 19-acre Purple Heart Walking Park & Fishing Pond, honoring wounded veterans, was dedicated on January 11, 2014. It has a 1/2 mile eight-foot-wide walking path, playground, and a 2 ½ acre pond. The project was a joint venture of the Beauregard Parish Police Jury, Louisiana Department of Transportation and the South Beauregard Recreation District No. 2. The Louisiana Department of Wildlife and Fisheries stocked and restocks the pond with Channel Catfish and Rainbow Trout.
