= Moss Bluff, Louisiana =

Moss Bluff
- Census-designated place
- Nickname: "The Bluff"
- Location of Moss Bluff in Louisiana
- Coordinates: 30°18′08″N 93°13′10″W
- Country: United States
- State: Louisiana
- Parish: Calcasieu

Area
  - Total: 15.92 sq mi (41.22 km^{2})
  - Land: 15.23 sq mi (39.44 km^{2})
  - Water: 0.69 sq mi (1.78 km^{2})
- Elevation: 20 ft (6.1 m)

Population (2020)
  - Total: 12,522
  - Density: 822.3/sq mi (317.49/km^{2})
- Time zone: UTC-6 (CST)
  - Summer (DST): UTC-5 (CDT)
- Area code: 337
- FIPS code: 22-52425
- GNIS feature ID: 2403308

Moss Bluff is a census-designated place (CDP) in Calcasieu Parish, Louisiana, United States. The population was 12,522 at the 2020 census. Located just north of the city of Lake Charles, it is considered a suburb of that city. Moss Bluff is a burgeoning community, and is one of the communities in Calcasieu Parish besides Lake Charles and Sulphur experiencing growth. Several efforts have been made to incorporate Moss Bluff, but at the present time the community is unincorporated.

== Geography ==
According to the United States Census Bureau, the CDP has a total area of 15.8 square miles (40.9 km^{2}), of which 15.2 square miles (39.4 km^{2}) is land and 0.6 square miles (1.6 km^{2}) (3.98%) is water.

Moss Bluff is intersected by U.S. Highway 171 and Louisiana Highway 378.

== Demographics ==
Historical population
Census	Pop.	Note	%±
1980	7,004		—
1990	8,039		14.8%
2000	10,535		31.0%
2010	11,557		9.7%
2020	12,522		8.3%
U.S. Decennial Census; 1950 1960 1970 1980; 1990 2000 2010

Moss Bluff first appeared as a census designated place the 1980 U.S. census.

Moss Bluff racial composition as of 2020
Race	Number	Percentage
White (non-Hispanic)	10,128	80.88%
Black or African American (non-Hispanic)	1,039	8.3%
Native American	69	0.55%
Asian	158	1.26%
Pacific Islander	1	0.01%
Other/Mixed	545	4.35%
Hispanic or Latino	582	4.65%

As of the 2020 United States census, there were 12,522 people, 4,163 households, and 3,061 families residing in the CDP. The population density was 692.6 inhabitants per square mile (267.4/km^{2}). There were 3,984 housing units at an average density of 261.9 per square mile (101.1/km^{2}). There were 4,163 households, out of which 28.3% had children under the age of 18 living with them, 67.0% were married couples living together, 11.0% had a female householder with no husband present, and 18.7% were non-families. 15.5% of all households were made up of individuals, and 5.3% had someone living alone who was 65 years of age or older. The average household size was 2.84 and the average family size was 3.16.

In the CDP, the population was spread out, with 29.9% under the age of 18, 9.0% from 18 to 24, 31.1% from 25 to 44, 22.1% from 45 to 64, and 7.8% who were 65 years of age or older. The median age was 34 years. For every 100 females, there were 95.9 males. For every 100 females age 18 and over, there were 93.6 males.

The median income for a household in the CDP was $60,588, and the median income for a family was $54,137. Males had a median income of $41,226 versus $22,327 for females. The per capita income for the CDP was $25,766. About 7.3% of families and 8.3% of the population were below the poverty line, including 9.7% of those under age 18 and 12.5% of those age 65 or over.

== Culture ==
Moss Bluff is the home of Sam Houston Jones State Park, a protected natural park of the state.

== Notable residents ==
David Filo, businessman and co-founder of Yahoo!.
Brett Geymann, businessman and Louisiana State Representative
Clifford Joseph Trahan, better known as Johnny Rebel, musician
Vic Stelly, author of the Stelly Plan and former Louisiana State Representative resides in Moss Bluff

== Education ==
Calcasieu Parish School Board is the school district for the entire parish.

Schools in Moss Bluff include:

- Moss Bluff Elementary School
- Moss Bluff Middle School
- Sam Houston High School

Moss Bluff's elementary and middle schools maintain some of the highest student populations in Calcasieu Parish. The single Moss Bluff high school, Sam Houston High School, competes in the Louisiana High School Athletic Association Class AAAAA.
