= Toledo Bend Reservoir =

Reservoir on the Sabine River, United States

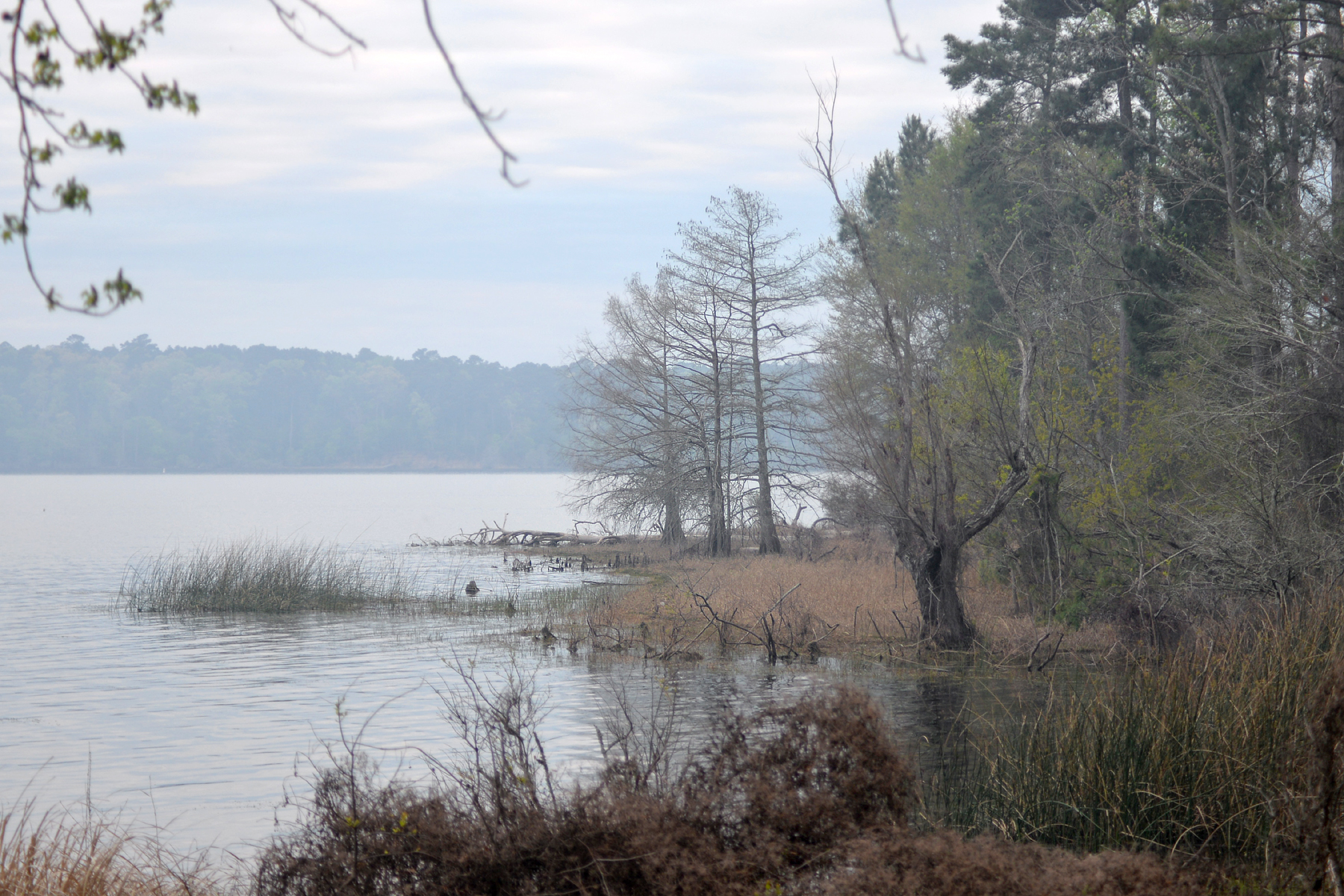
- An inlet of the Reservoir seen from Indian Mounds Wilderness, Sabine National Forest

- Location within Louisiana Location within Texas Location within the United States
- Location: Texas / Louisiana
- Coordinates: 31°11′47″N 93°34′20″W
- Lake type: reservoir
- Primary inflows: Sabine River
- Primary outflows: Sabine River
- Basin countries: United States
- Max. length: 65 mi (105 km)
- Max. width: 10 mi (16 km)
- Surface area: 186,000 acres (75,000 ha)
- Average depth: 24 ft (7 m)
- Max. depth: 110 ft (34 m)
- Water volume: 4,477,000 acre⋅ft (5.52 km^{3})
- Shore length^{1}: 1,264 mi (2,030 km)
- Surface elevation: 170 ft (52 m)
- ^{1} Shore length is not a well-defined measure.

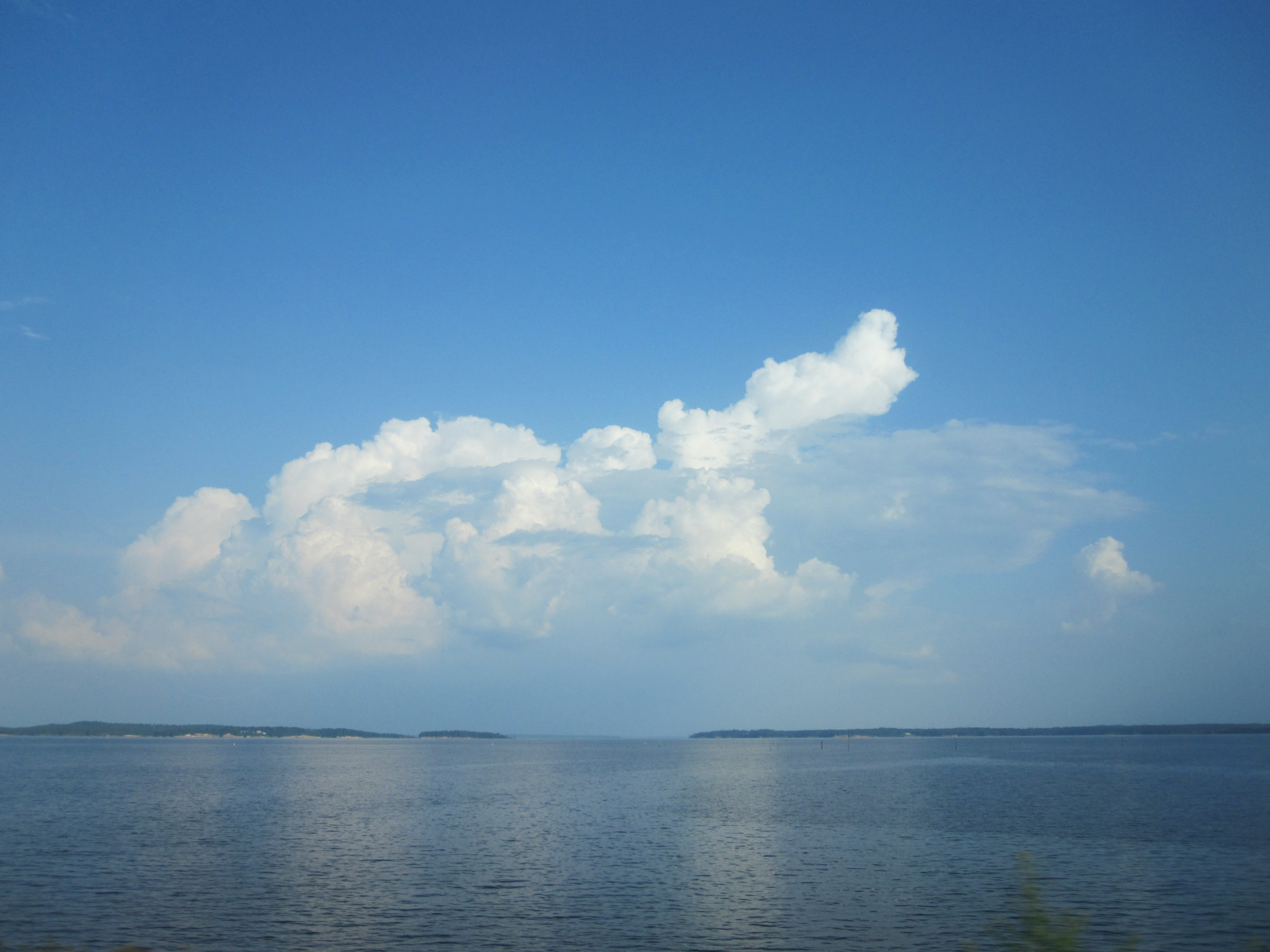
Toledo Bend straddles the Louisiana and Texas border west of Many.

Toledo Bend Reservoir is a reservoir on the Sabine River between Texas and Louisiana. The lake has an area of 185,000 acres (750 km^{2}), the largest man-made body of water partially in both Louisiana and Texas, the largest in the South, and the fifth largest by surface acre in the United States. The dam is capable of generating 92 megawatts of electrical power. The dam itself is located in the northeast corner of Newton County, Texas; however, that county includes very little of the reservoir, as most of it extends northward into parts of Sabine and DeSoto parishes in Louisiana, and Sabine, Shelby, and Panola counties in Texas.

== Historical development ==
The land along the Orange area often flooded from the Sabine, with destructive effects. Also, the considerations for municipal, industrial, agricultural, and recreational purposes were part of the reasons the Texas State Legislature formed the Sabine River Authority of Texas (SRA-T) in 1949, and in 1950 the Louisiana State Legislature created the Sabine River Authority, State of Louisiana (SRA-L) for the project.

The two autonomous entities formed the Sabine River Compact, a memorandum of agreement, approved by the Legislatures of the States of Texas (1953) and Louisiana (1954), The U.S. Congress, and the President. These organizations and the compact were a result of efforts that began with the Sabine River Watershed Association of Texas after World War II as well as citizens from Louisiana, to create a freshwater supply, that included hydroelectric power, as well as providing recreation.

With both authorities in agreement, in 1955 a feasibility report was initiated and by 1959, the two states allocated 30 million dollars for the project; the two states' Sabine River authorities also sold a total of $30 million in revenue bonds. The land was acquired in 1963, with the work following the subsequent year. The Massman-Johnson Construction Company served as the general contractor, and by the completion of the project in 1969 (57 years ago), Texas' estimated share of the funds was $70 million. The dam was built by the two states, without any assistance from the federal government.

== History ==
Beginning in May 1963, land acquisitions for Toledo Bend Reservoir started as a joint management project of Texas and Louisiana River Authorities. Construction on the Toledo Bend Dam, spillway, and power plant, began on May 11, 1964. The closure section of the earthen embankment and impoundment of water was begun in October 1966. The power plant was completed and began operating in the early part of 1969. The Toledo Bend Project was constructed primarily for the purposes of water supply, hydroelectric power generation, and recreation.

Toledo Bend Reservoir forms a portion of the boundary between the states of Texas and Louisiana. From the dam site, which is north of Burkeville, TX, the reservoir extends up the river for about 65 miles (105 km) to Logansport, LA, and inundates land in Sabine, Shelby, Panola, and Newton Counties, Texas, and Sabine and DeSoto Parishes, Louisiana.

In 2003, during recovery operations following the Space Shuttle Columbia disaster, some remains of the astronauts were recovered west of the Reservoir.

=== Area impact ===
Many communities were affected in the impacted parishes and counties.

==== Sabine Parish ====
In Sabine Parish, there were several communities that included houses and other buildings such as schools and churches predominantly poor and minority, that were inundated.

- Pine Flat Community (100 individuals and included about 50 homes and a school),
- Barlake community,
- Richard Neck community,
- Kites Landing

The water, normally covering an area of about 186,000 acres (750 km^{2}) has a controlled storage capacity of 4,477,000 acre-feet (5.52 km^{3}).

Toledo Bend is the nation's only public water conservation and hydroelectric power project to be undertaken without federal participation in its permanent financing.

== Public recreation ==
Toledo Bend, with its 1,200 miles (1,900 km) of shoreline, offers a large variety of recreational activities and is a major element in serving the growing demand for water oriented outdoor recreation. Both private and public facilities are available for swimming, boating, picnicking, fishing, camping, hunting, and sightseeing. The reservoir is a popular location for freshwater fishing with many clubs hosting tournaments. The western shores of the reservoir are largely within the boundary of Sabine National Forest, Texas.

At present, the lake is best suited to shallow draft power boats due to a large number of trees and stumps that are still in the body of the lake. Although there are numerous well marked boat lanes that have been cleared of stumps and trees, one should use caution even on the boat lanes; one should use extreme caution when off the boat lanes and maintain a watch for stumps and/or trees as well as floating logs.

The lake is home to the Toledo Bend Army Recreation Park. The park is located on the south end of the lake, and is available only to active and retired military personnel and government employees. The park offers a convenience store with well-maintained fleet of pontoon boats, bay boats, bass boats, kayaks, and canoes for rent. A developed beach area with a bath house, cabins, and yurts are available. The park is operated by the US Army at nearby Fort Polk in Leesville, Vernon Parish.

== See also ==
- Lawrence T. Fuglaar, former member of the Louisiana House of Representatives and 1972 drowning victim on the lake
- Conway LeBleu, represented Calcasieu and Cameron parishes in the Louisiana House from 1964 to 1988 and was member of the Sabine River Authority
- Isle Brevelle, a nearby community and the birthplace of Creole culture.
- Texas Oilman's Bass Invitational
- Anne des Cadeaux, an early explorer and Native American of the area.
- Los Adaes
