= National Register of Historic Places listings in Pointe Coupee Parish, Louisiana =

Location of Pointe Coupee Parish in Louisiana

This is a list of the National Register of Historic Places listings in Pointe Coupee Parish, Louisiana.

This is intended to be a complete list of the properties on the National Register of Historic Places in Pointe Coupee Parish, Louisiana, United States. The locations of National Register properties for which the latitude and longitude coordinates are included below, may be seen in a map.

There are 33 properties listed on the National Register in the parish, including 1 National Historic Landmark.

This National Park Service list is complete through NPS recent listings posted December 12, 2025.

== Current listings ==
	Name on the Register	Image	Date listed	Location	City or town	Description
1	Austerlitz	Austerlitz	April 22, 1991 (#91000416)	Louisiana Highway 1 southeast of its junction with Louisiana Highway 78; 30°37′15″N 91°28′40″W	Oscar	
2	Jean Baptiste Bergeron House	Jean Baptiste Bergeron House	May 13, 1994 (#94000407)	13769 Chenal Rd. 30°36′40″N 91°22′51″W	Jarreau	
3	Valmont Bergeron House	Valmont Bergeron House	May 14, 1992 (#92000512)	Louisiana Highway 414; 30°36′43″N 91°22′49″W	Jarreau	
4	Bonnie Glen	Bonnie Glen	January 11, 1980 (#80001749)	Southwest of New Roads on Louisiana Highway 1; 30°39′16″N 91°29′12″W	New Roads vicinity	
5	Cherie Quarters Cabins	Cherie Quarters Cabins	April 26, 1995 (#95000470)	Major Ln., approximately ½ mile from its junction with Louisiana Highway 1; 30°36′03″N 91°26′10″W	Oscar	Two surviving of 30 or more original slave quarters cabins of Riverlake plantation, dating from c.1840.
6	Jacques Dupre House	Jacques Dupre House	December 5, 2003 (#03001232)	13987 Chenal Rd. 30°36′49″N 91°22′48″W	Jarreau	
7	El Dorado Plantation House	El Dorado Plantation House	March 24, 1982 (#82002791)	Bayou Maringouin, Louisiana Highway 77; 30°31′20″N 91°32′45″W	Livonia vicinity	
8	First National Bank	First National Bank	June 20, 2002 (#02000653)	102 E. Main St. 30°41′33″N 91°26′03″W	New Roads	
9	Glynnwood	Glynnwood	November 2, 1982 (#82000452)	Louisiana Highway 416; 30°37′27″N 91°21′24″W	Glynn	
10	Labatut	Labatut	August 15, 1991 (#91001056)	Junction of Louisiana Highways 10 and Louisiana Highway 420; 30°43′45″N 91°29′00″W	New Roads vicinity	
11	Lakeside		March 29, 1984 (#84001346)	Louisiana Highway 419; 30°50′15″N 91°38′40″W	Batchelor	
12	LeBeau House and Kitchen		May 9, 1985 (#85000974)	Louisiana Highway 414; 30°37′10″N 91°22′35″W	Jarreau	
13	LeJeune House	LeJeune House	November 28, 1978 (#78001435)	507 E. Main St. 30°41′40″N 91°25′47″W	New Roads	
14	Albin Major House		April 22, 1991 (#91000415)	1304 False River Rd. (Louisiana Highway 1); 30°41′22″N 91°26′50″W	New Roads	
15	Mix Store and Post Office	Mix Store and Post Office	June 19, 2018 (#100002587)	9253 False River Rd. 30°39′30″N 91°29′04″W	Mix	
16	New Roads Commercial Historic District		March 19, 2024 (#100008456)	453 East Main to 348 West Main, 107-121 Court, 124-151 New Roads, 142 St. Mary, and 112-159 Richey Sts.; Morrison Pkwy. 30°41′36″N 91°26′02″W	New Roads	
17	North Bend	North Bend	October 8, 1992 (#92001336)	Louisiana Highway 1 west of its junction with Louisiana Highway 416, east of Oscar; 30°36′41″N 91°26′52″W	Oscar	
18	Old Hickory	Old Hickory	June 15, 1979 (#79001081)	Southeast of LaCour; 30°49′27″N 91°36′11″W	Lacour	
19	Parlange Plantation House	Parlange Plantation House	April 15, 1970 (#70000258)	Junction of Louisiana Highways 1 and 78; 30°37′49″N 91°29′14″W	Mix	Large two-story French Colonial home built circa 1750 by Vincent de Ternant. Used as military headquarters by both C.S.A. and Union generals during the Civil War. Open by appointment.
20	Pleasant View Plantation House	Pleasant View Plantation House	April 5, 1984 (#84001347)	Louisiana Highway 1; 30°36′51″N 91°27′28″W	Oscar	
21	Pointe Coupee Parish Courthouse	Pointe Coupee Parish Courthouse	October 7, 1981 (#81000710)	Main St. 30°41′38″N 91°25′57″W	New Roads	
22	Pointe Coupee Parish Museum	Pointe Coupee Parish Museum	September 30, 1980 (#80001750)	6 miles southwest of New Roads on Louisiana Highway 1; 30°37′59″N 91°29′13″W	New Roads vicinity	
23	Poydras High School	Poydras High School	March 7, 1996 (#96000229)	500 W. Main St. 30°41′34″N 91°26′16″W	New Roads	
24	Fannie Riche House	Fannie Riche House	April 22, 1991 (#91000413)	Louisiana Highway 420 near its junction with Louisiana Highway 10; 30°43′46″N 91°28′19″W	New Roads vicinity	
25	Riverlake	Riverlake	April 13, 1983 (#83000534)	Louisiana Highway 1; 30°36′28″N 91°26′07″W	Oscar	Creole-style plantation house on False River, dating from c. 1820.
26	St. Francis Chapel	St. Francis Chapel	May 25, 1979 (#79001082)	Northwest of New Roads on Louisiana Highway 10; 30°43′45″N 91°29′12″W	New Roads vicinity	
27	St. Stephen's Episcopal Church	St. Stephen's Episcopal Church	April 24, 1974 (#74000939)	North of Innis off Louisiana Highway 418; 30°53′52″N 91°40′09″W	Innis	
28	Saizon House	Saizon House	April 22, 1991 (#91000417)	Louisiana Highway 414 east of its junction with Louisiana Highway 413; 30°36′32″N 91°23′03″W	Jarreau	
29	Samson House	Samson House	December 19, 1997 (#97001515)	405 Richey St. 30°41′45″N 91°26′08″W	New Roads	
30	Satterfield Motor Company Building	Satterfield Motor Company Building	July 7, 1994 (#94000700)	108 E. Main St. 30°41′34″N 91°26′01″W	New Roads	
31	Valverda Plantation House	Valverda Plantation House	April 1, 2002 (#02000297)	2217 Louisiana Highway 977; 30°32′19″N 91°32′43″W	Maringouin vicinity	Located in Pointe Coupee Parish but with an Iberville Parish mailing address.
32	White Hall Plantation House	White Hall Plantation House	May 26, 1977 (#77000677)	Louisiana Highway 418; 30°58′59″N 91°46′42″W	Lettsworth	Late 1840s Italianate and Greek Revival mansion attributed to architect Henry Howard. Used as a headquarters by Union General Nathaniel Banks in 1863. Restored and opened to the public in 2013.
33	Wickliffe	Wickliffe	April 22, 1991 (#91000414)	Louisiana Highway 415 east of Patin Duke Slough; 30°40′59″N 91°22′58″W	New Roads vicinity	

== Former listings ==
	Name on the Register	Image	Date listed	Date removed	Location	City or town	Description
1	Ovide LaCour Store		July 27, 1979 (#79001080)	November 29, 2016	Louisiana Highway 419; 30°49′40″N 91°36′38″W	Lacour	

== See also ==
- List of National Historic Landmarks in Louisiana
- National Register of Historic Places listings in Louisiana
