= St. Francis Chapel =

St. Francis Chapel may refer to:

- St. Francis Chapel (Boston, Massachusetts)
- St. Francis Chapel (Colonie, New York)
- St. Francis Chapel (New Roads, Louisiana), listed on the National Register of Historic Places in Louisiana

== See also ==
- Basilica of San Francesco d'Assisi
