= Pleasant View Plantation House =

Historic house in Louisiana, United States

- U.S. National Register of Historic Places
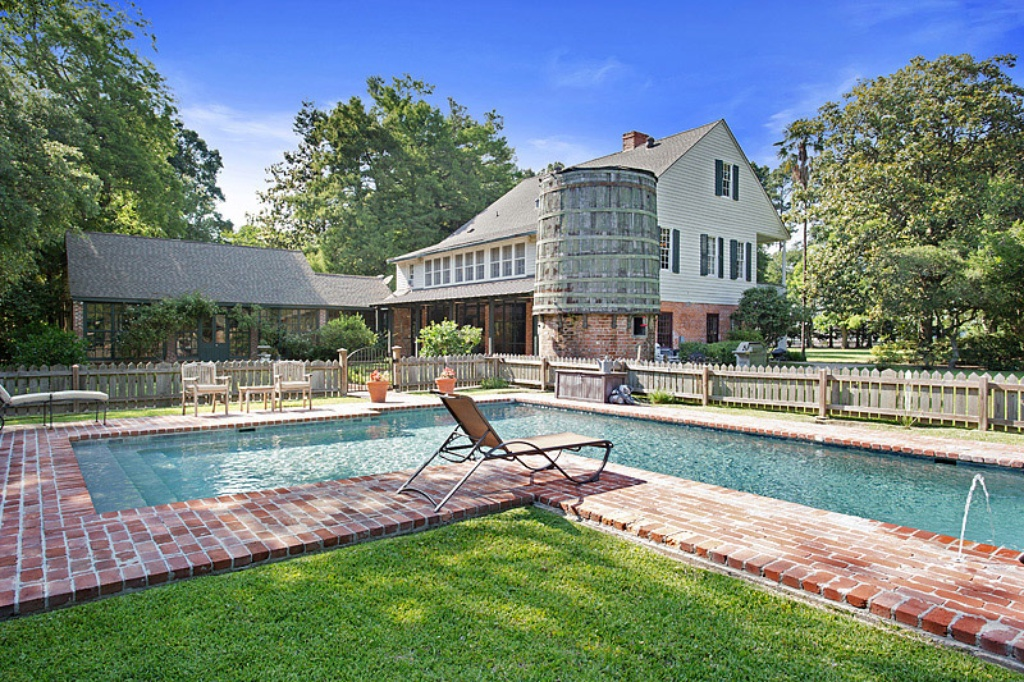
- The original house to the right with the new addition to the left

- Location within Louisiana Location within the United States
- Location: Louisiana Highway 1, Oscar, Louisiana
- Coordinates: 30.61428°N 91.45804°W
- Area: 0.3 acres (0.12 ha)
- Built: c. 1820
- Architectural style: Creole
- NRHP reference No.: 84001347
- Added to NRHP: April 5, 1984

Pleasant View Plantation House is located in Oscar, Louisiana. It was built around 1820 and was added to the National Register of Historic Places on April 5, 1984.

It is Creole in style, one of 193 buildings in Pointe Coupee Parish identified in a study of older buildings. It is further, however, "one of a distinct group of eight large Creole plantation houses which, architecturally speaking, represent the apex of the Creole style in the parish. This can be seen in the following:

1. Pleasant View is a full two stories high, unlike the normal one story Creole cottages found in the parish,
2. It features brick between posts construction, (The vast majority of the parish's Creole houses have plain frame walls with no infill.)
3. It features pre-Greek Revival details such as turned gallery columns and Adamesque mantels. These details which are associated with the Creole style do not occur often In the parish. Most of the so-called "Creole" buildings of Pointe Coupee Parish are Creole in plan and configuration only. Typically they feature Greek Revival, Victorian, or bungalow details."

It is located in Oscar on the south side of Louisiana Highway 1, in from the south bank of False River.

== See also ==
- List of plantations in Louisiana
- National Register of Historic Places listings in Pointe Coupee Parish, Louisiana
