= Riverlake =

Historic house in Louisiana, United States

- U.S. National Register of Historic Places
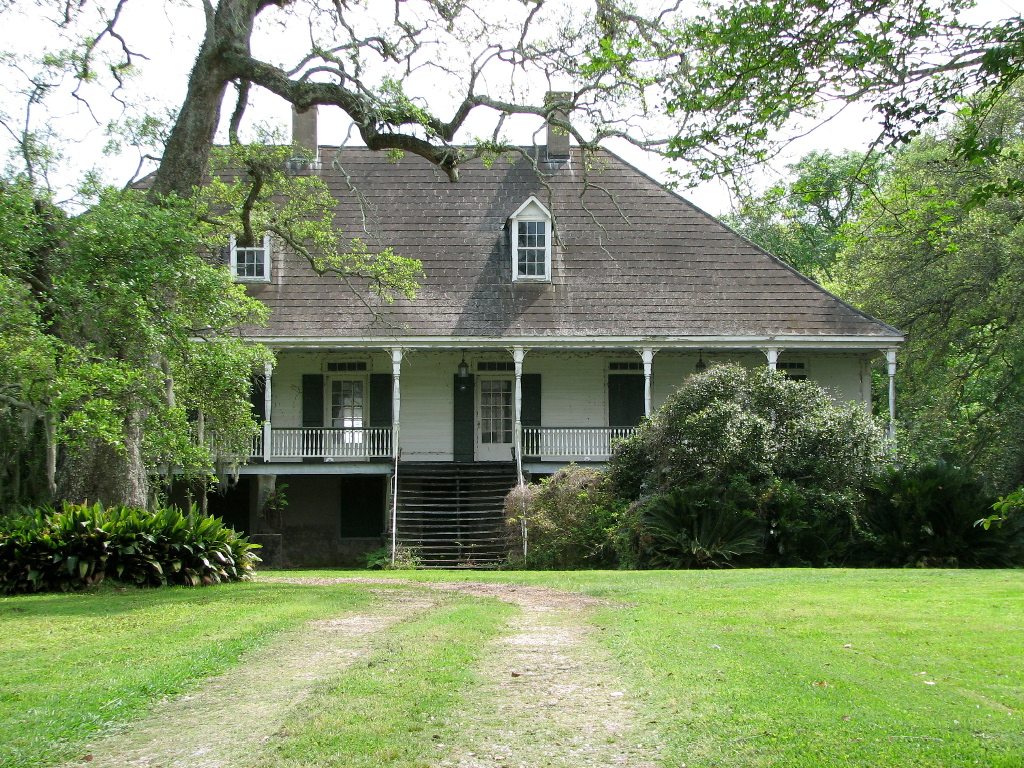

- Location within Louisiana Location within the United States
- Nearest city: Oscar, Louisiana
- Coordinates: 30.60764°N 91.43528°W
- Built: c.1820, c.1840-45, c.1890
- Architectural style: Creole
- NRHP reference No.: 83000534
- Added to NRHP: April 13, 1983

Riverlake is a plantation and an antebellum mansion, located on the west bank of the False River in Pointe Coupee Parish, Louisiana, about 8 miles (13 km) south of New Roads, Louisiana.

The house is a raised Creole-style plantation house built and modified in c.1820, c.1840-45, and c.1890. The listing included two pigeonniers, believed to date from c.1820.

It was listed on the National Register of Historic Places in 1983.

The plantation is the birthplace of author Ernest Gaines, who played in its slave quarters area while a child. Two of those slave cabins survive, out of 30 or more, and are separately listed on the National Register as the Cherie Quarters Cabins.

It is currently owned by the Calliet family.

A brief ownership timeline:

- Before 1793: Land grant issued to Isaac Gaillard. [loc.gov], [loc.gov]
- Circa 1823: Antoine DeCuir built the plantation house and established Riverlake Plantation. [loc.gov], [lthp.org], [loc.gov]
- Circa 1845: DeCuir's daughter Antoinette DeCuir inherited the property and made modifications to the house. [loc.gov], [loc.gov]
- 1892: The plantation was sold to P. C. Major.
