= Satterfield Motor Company Building =

- U.S. National Register of Historic Places
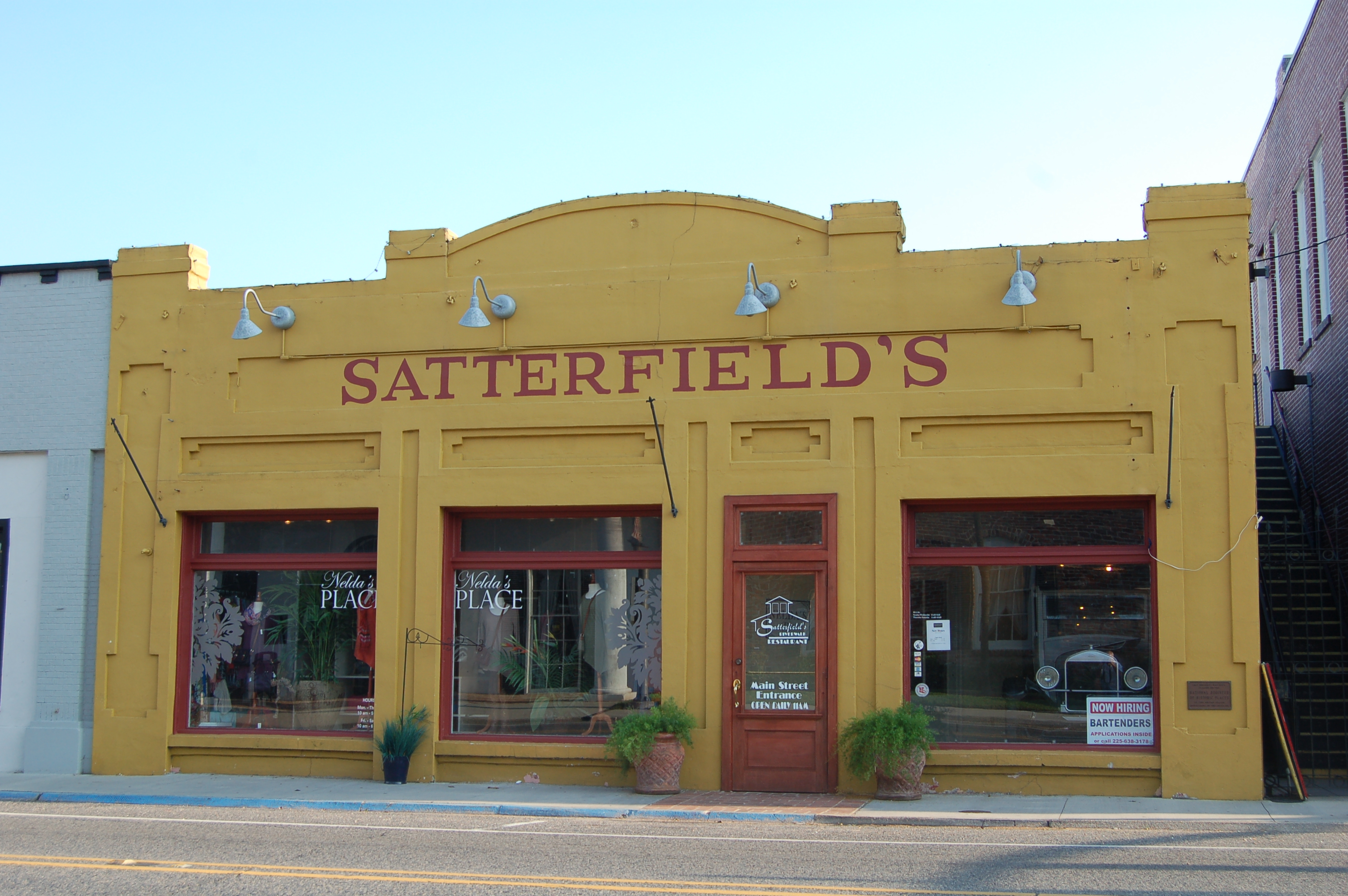
- Building in 2014

- Location within Louisiana
- Location: 108 E. Main Street, New Roads, Louisiana
- Coordinates: 30°41′34″N 91°26′01″W
- Area: less than one acre
- Built: 1918
- Built by: Bouanchaud & Herring
- Architect: Phil B. Seibold
- NRHP reference No.: 94000700
- Added to NRHP: July 7, 1994

Satterfield Motor Company Building is a single-story commercial building at 108 E. Main Street, New Roads, Louisiana. The building was built in 1918 and backs onto the False River. It was listed on the National Register of Historic Places in 1994.

It was deemed significant in automotive history in the area, as part of introducing the newfangled things. By 1915 Ford cars could be ordered in Baton Rouge, approximately 35 mi (56 km) away. In 1917 it was announced in The Pointe Coupee Banner that Theodore E. Satterfield was appointed agent for the Ford Motor Company, and would open a dealership in "'a splendid brick building on Main Street that will be an ornament to the town.'" It was apparently the first full automotive dealership in the town with showroom space as well as parts and service departments.

The building was designed by architect Phil B. Seibold in late 1917 and was constructed by contractors Bouanchaud & Herring in 1918. It is an L-shaped one-story stucco-over-brick building, with shared party walls. It has three bays on the front divided by piers which rise above a parapet, whose center section has a curved shape.

The NRHP nomination document is silent on how long the dealership operated. Photos from 1994 show the building vacant, with no sign. A restaurant named "Satterfield's Upper Deck Restaurant", overlooking False River, was closed in May 2020 due to "coronavirus uncertainty", but the "Landing Bar" downstairs would remain open.

== See also ==
- Bohn Motor Company Automobile Dealership: NRHP-listed in New Orleans
- National Register of Historic Places listings in Pointe Coupee Parish, Louisiana
