= Men of the Immaculata =

Catholic men's conference

- Formation: 2017
- Founders: Father Miles Walsh, Hunter Hardin, Mark Hermann, Scott L. Smith, Jr.
- Type: Catholic lay society Marian devotional society
- Headquarters: Baton Rouge, Louisiana
- Website: www.menoftheimmaculata.com

The Men of the Immaculata (MOTI) was founded in 2017 in the Diocese of Baton Rouge. It is an organization that hosts annual Catholic men's conferences. Scott L. Smith, Jr. is the chairman.

The organization's annual conference program, edited by Smith, is The Catholic ManBook.

== 2021 Conference ==
The 2021 Men of the Immaculata conference will include Deacon Harold Burke-Sivers, Dr. Allen Hunt, and Father Reuben Dykes as speakers. The 2021 theme is "St. Joseph, Pillar of Families, Protector of the Church, and Terror of Demons". Attendees will be encouraged to undertake the Consecration to Saint Joseph created by Father Donald Calloway, MIC.
