= Andrew J. Bryan =

American architect

Andrew J. Bryan (1848–1921) was an architect in the Southern United States, known for his work on county courthouses.

Based in Jackson, Mississippi, he designed the Old Monroe County Courthouse in Monroeville, Alabama, and the Pointe Coupee Parish Courthouse in New Roads, Louisiana.
