= Trina Scott =

Trina Scott may refer to

- Trina Grimes Scott Edwards, reality TV star with Edwin Edwards, four-time governor of Louisiana
- Trina Olinde Scott, first female mayor of New Roads, Louisiana
