= Jacques Dupre House =

Jacques Dupre House may refer to:

- Jacques Dupre House (Jarreau, Louisiana), listed on the National Register of Historic Places in Pointe Coupee Parish, Louisiana
- Jacques Dupre House (Opelousas, Louisiana), formerly listed on the National Register of Historic Places in St. Landry Parish, Louisiana
