= Scott L. Smith Jr. =

American Catholic author (born 1983)

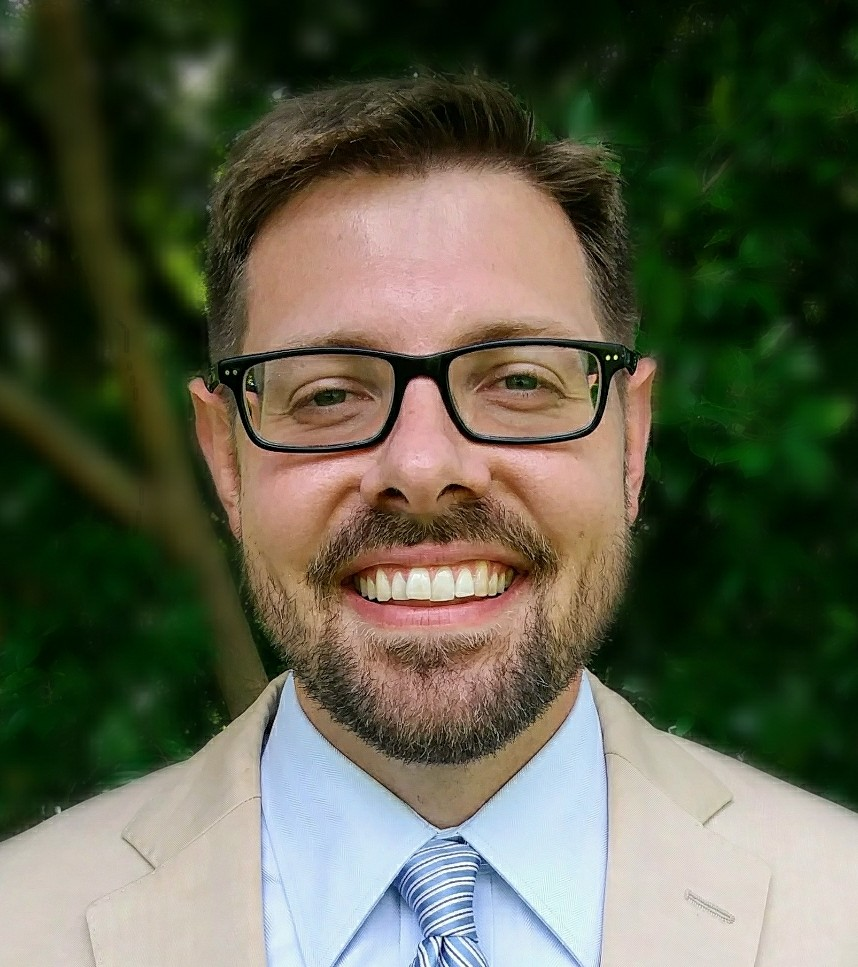
- Born: 26 May 1983 (age 43); Baton Rouge, Louisiana, U.S.
- Education: Texas A&M University; Louisiana State University, Paul M. Hebert Law Center; Notre Dame Seminary
- Occupations: Author, Attorney
- Spouse: Sara Ashton LaGrone
- Children: 6
- Writing career
- Notable works: Near Death Experiences, Pray the Rosary with Saint John Paul II, Lord of the Rings and the Eucharist

Scott L. Smith Jr. (born 26 May 1983) is a Catholic American author and attorney. Smith is the author of several books of Catholic theology and devotion including 33 Days to the Holy Family and Consecration to St. Joseph for Children and Families co-authored with Fr. Donald Calloway, Near Death Experiences, Pray the Rosary with St. John Paul II, The Catholic ManBook, and a new translation of the Preparation for Total Consecration according to Saint Louis de Montfort. He is the past Chairman of the Men of the Immaculata.

== Career and personal life ==
Smith graduated from Edmond Memorial High School in 2001 and Texas A&M University in 2006 with a degree in chemical engineering. He then entered the Jesuit Novitiate in Grand Coteau, Louisiana. Smith has a master's degree in theology from Notre Dame Seminary in New Orleans, Louisiana. He received his juris doctor from the Paul M. Hebert Law Center of Louisiana State University in 2013.

Smith was an assistant attorney general with the Office of the Louisiana Attorney General from 2015 to 2019 before opening his own law practice.

Smith lives in New Roads, Louisiana, with his wife Sara Ashton LaGrone and their five children.

== Writing and podcasting ==
In 2010, Smith began a series of articles exploring the Lembas waybread as a symbol for the Eucharist in The Lord of the Rings by J. R. R. Tolkien. These articles were published as an anthology, Lord of the Rings and the Eucharist. Actor Kevin O'Brien, who has portrayed J. R. R. Tolkien on EWTN and elsewhere, narrated the audiobook version of Lord of the Rings and the Eucharist.

Since 2010, Smith has worked as a freelance essayist and lecturer on Biblical topics, including typology, Mariology, and Biblical references in contemporary books and movies. Smith has written and lectured on Mary, mother of Jesus.

Smith has written on Catholic and Christian themes appearing in comics, science fiction, and current movies. A collection of his articles on these topics was published as The Theology of Sci-Fi: The Christian's Guide to the Galaxy.

In 2018, Smith collaborated with Louisiana historian Brian J. Costello on a series of biographies of holy men and beatified people, entitled Blessed Is He Who ...: Models of Catholic Manhood.

Smith co-authored with Fr. Donald Calloway the Consecration to St. Joseph for Children and Families.

In 2025, Smith published a Catholic overview of near-death experiences. This work, Near Death Experiences, is believed to be the first comprehensive Catholic treatment of the subject from an historical, Biblical, and contemporary perspective.

Smith has written several horror novels, including The Seventh Word and The Cajun Zombie Chronicles.

As of 2019, Smith co-hosts the Catholic Nerds Podcast.

== Awards ==
Smith's blog was awarded the 2018 Fisher's Net award for "Best Blog".

== Bibliography ==
=== Non-fiction ===
==== Sole author ====
- Near Death Experiences, 2025, Sophia Institute Press, ISBN 979-8-88911-114-6
- The Catholic ManBook, originally published 2017, Holy Water Books, ISBN 0-99836-035-X
- St. Louis de Montfort's Total Consecration to Jesus through Mary - New Easier-to-Read Translation, 2019, Holy Water Books, Marian Consecration Guide, ISBN 1-95078-205-0
- Lord of the Rings and the Eucharist, 2019, Holy Water Books, The Catholic Theology of J. R. R. Tolkien, ISBN 0-99836-038-4
- Pray the Rosary with Saint John Paul II, 2020, Holy Water Books, ISBN 1-95078-208-5
- Pray Like a Warrior: Spiritual Combat & War Room Prayer Guide, 2020, Holy Water Books, ISBN 1-95078-223-9
- The Theology of Sci-Fi: The Christian's Guide to the Galaxy, 2020, Holy Water Books, ISBN 1-95078-226-3

==== Collaborative works ====
- 33 Days to the Holy Family with co-author Fr. Donald Calloway, Marian Press, 2025, ISBN 9781596146600
- The Christbearer: Exploring the Connection between The Mandalorian and Christian Saints, Philip Kosloski, Scott L. Smith Jr., and other authors, Voyage Comics, 2023, ISBN 979-8985771985
- Consecration to St. Joseph for Children and Families with co-author Fr. Donald Calloway, Marian Press, 2022, ISBN 9781596145641
- Blessed Is He Who ...: Models of Catholic Manhood, Brian J. Costello and Scott L. Smith Jr., Holy Water Books, 2018, ISBN 0-99836-034-1
- Pray, Hope, & Don't Worry Prayer Journal for Catholic Women: A 52-Week Guided Devotional Through Scripture and the Saints to Overcome Anxiety, Sara A. Smith and Scott L. Smith Jr., Holy Water Books, 2020, ISBN 1-95078-216-6
- Pray, Hope, & Don't Worry Women's Prayer Journal For Overcoming Anxiety: A 52-week Guided Devotional of Prayers & Bible Verses to Conquer Stress & Fear, Sara A. Smith and Scott L. Smith Jr., 2020, ISBN 1-95078-215-8

=== Academic publications ===
- "The Age of St Joseph at His Betrothal to the Virgin Mary: The Witness of Sacred Scripture", Josephology Studies, Vol. 1, pp. 131-153

=== Fiction ===
- The Seventh Word, Holy Water Books, 2016, ISBN 0-69278-816-6
- The Cajun Zombie Chronicles, the first of which is The River Dead, Holy Water Books, 2016, ISBN 0-69278-816-6
