= First National Bank (New Roads, Louisiana) =

Historic building in New Roads, Louisiana, U.S.

- U.S. National Register of Historic Places
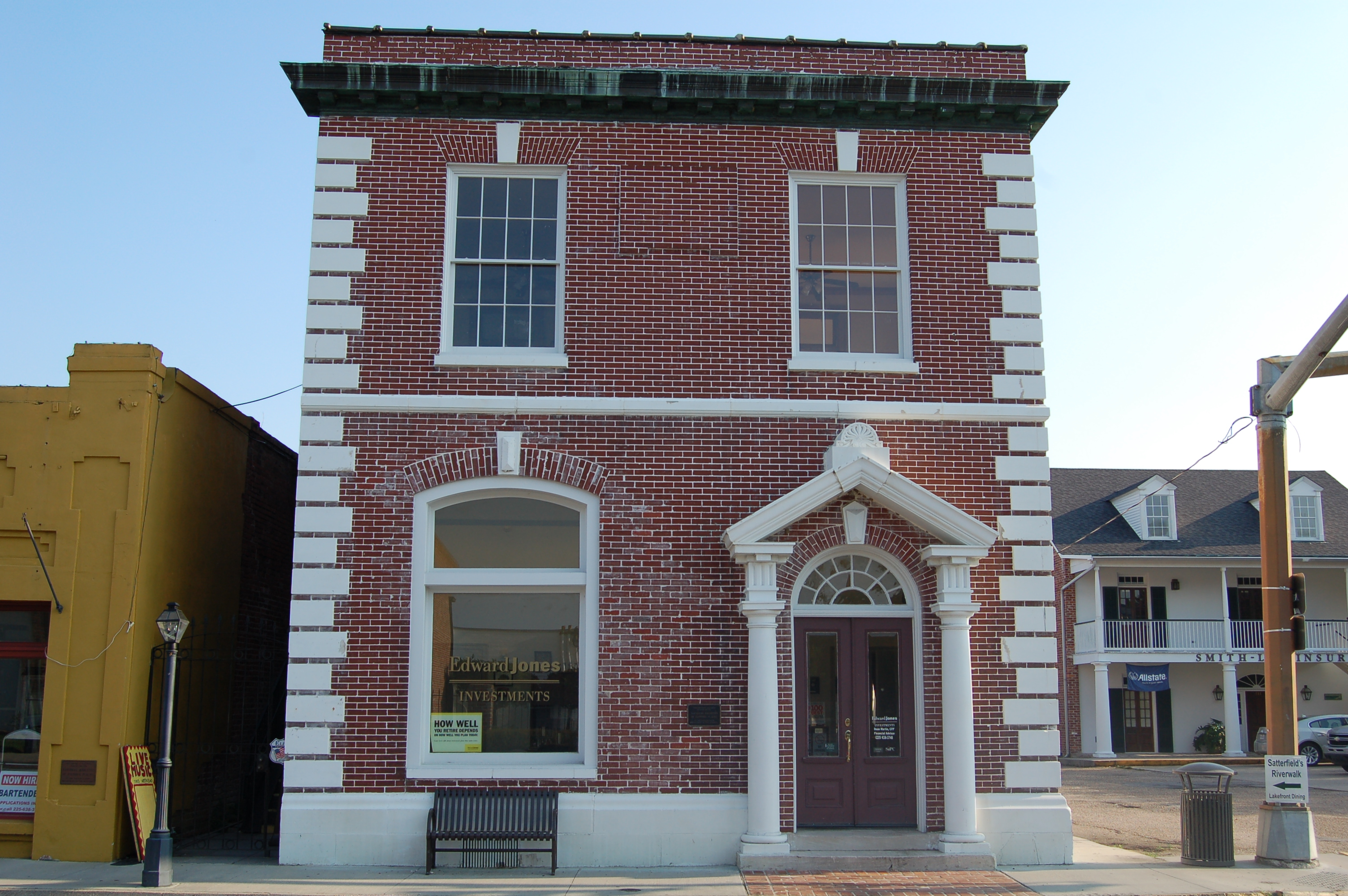

- Location within Louisiana Location within the United States
- Location: 102 E. Main St., New Roads, Louisiana
- Coordinates: 30°41′33″N 91°26′03″W
- Area: less than one acre
- Built: 1909
- Architect: Emmett J. Hull
- Architectural style: Classical Revival
- NRHP reference No.: 02000653
- Added to NRHP: June 20, 2002

The First National Bank in New Roads, Louisiana is a two-story Classical Revival-style brick building. It was built in 1909 as the new headquarters building of the First National Bank of New Roads, which had been opened in 1905. It costs $7,200 to build and is the only highly styled building in New Roads.

The bank failed in 1912 and the building was occupied by the Bank of New Roads, a competitor. It was used as a jewelry store from 1928 to 1998. Starting in 1934, jeweler Oscar Hebert allowed a rear first-floor room to serve as a community library.
