= Jean Baptiste Bergeron House =

Historic house in Louisiana, United States

- U.S. National Register of Historic Places
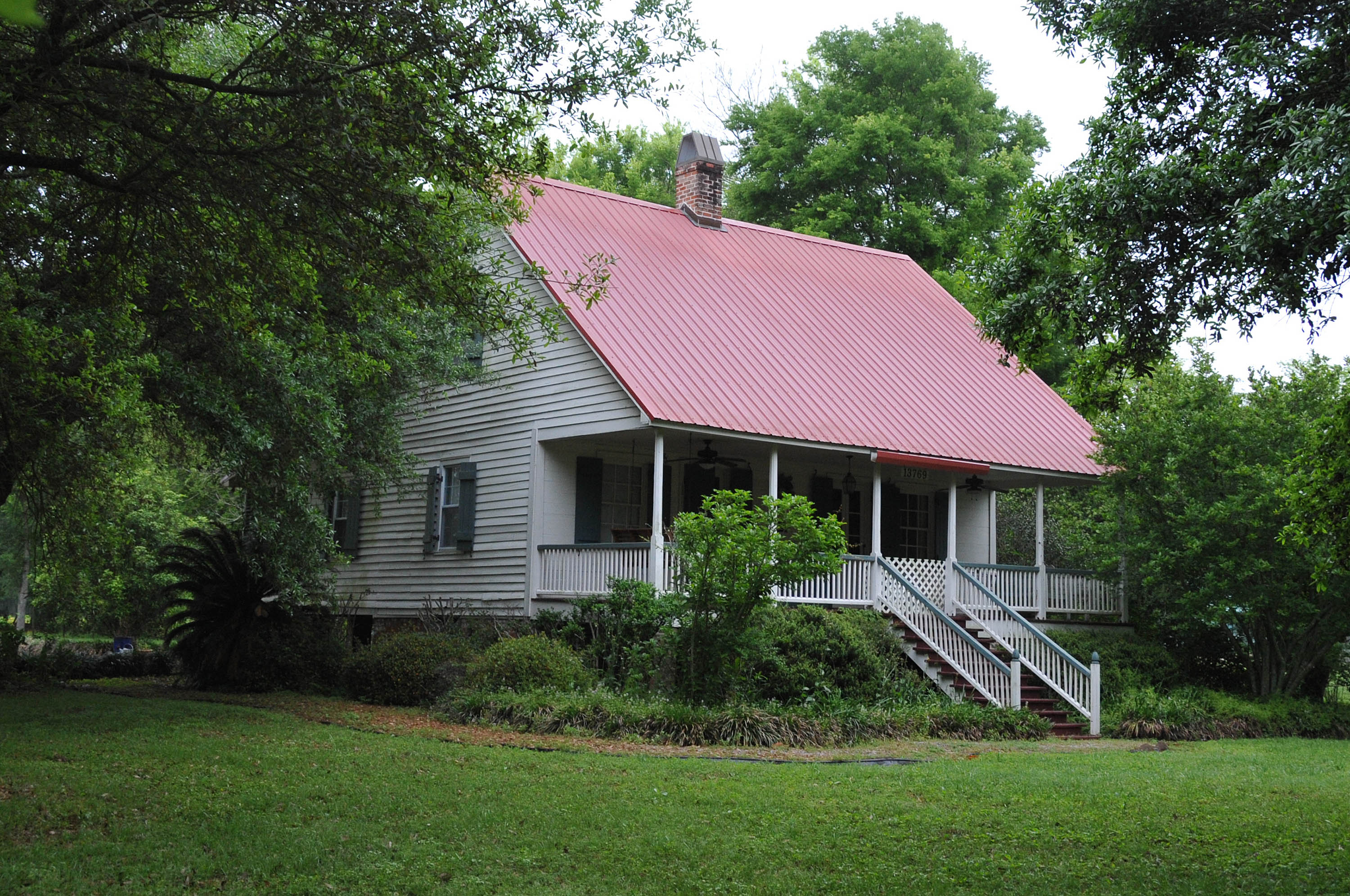

- Location within Louisiana Location within the United States
- Location: 13769 Chenal Rd., near Jarreau, Louisiana
- Coordinates: 30°36′40″N 91°22′51″W
- Area: 4.4 acres (1.8 ha)
- Built: c.1840
- Architectural style: French Creole
- MPS: Louisiana's French Creole Architecture MPS
- NRHP reference No.: 94000407
- Added to NRHP: May 13, 1994

The Jean Baptiste Bergeron House in Pointe Coupee Parish, Louisiana was built in c.1840. It was listed on the National Register of Historic Places in 1994.

It is a brick and frame plantation house built in the French Creole style. It is on the Chenal Road (Louisiana Highway 414) between the communities of Jarreau and Chenal.
