= El Dorado Plantation =

Historic house in Louisiana, United States

- El Dorado Plantation House
- U.S. National Register of Historic Places
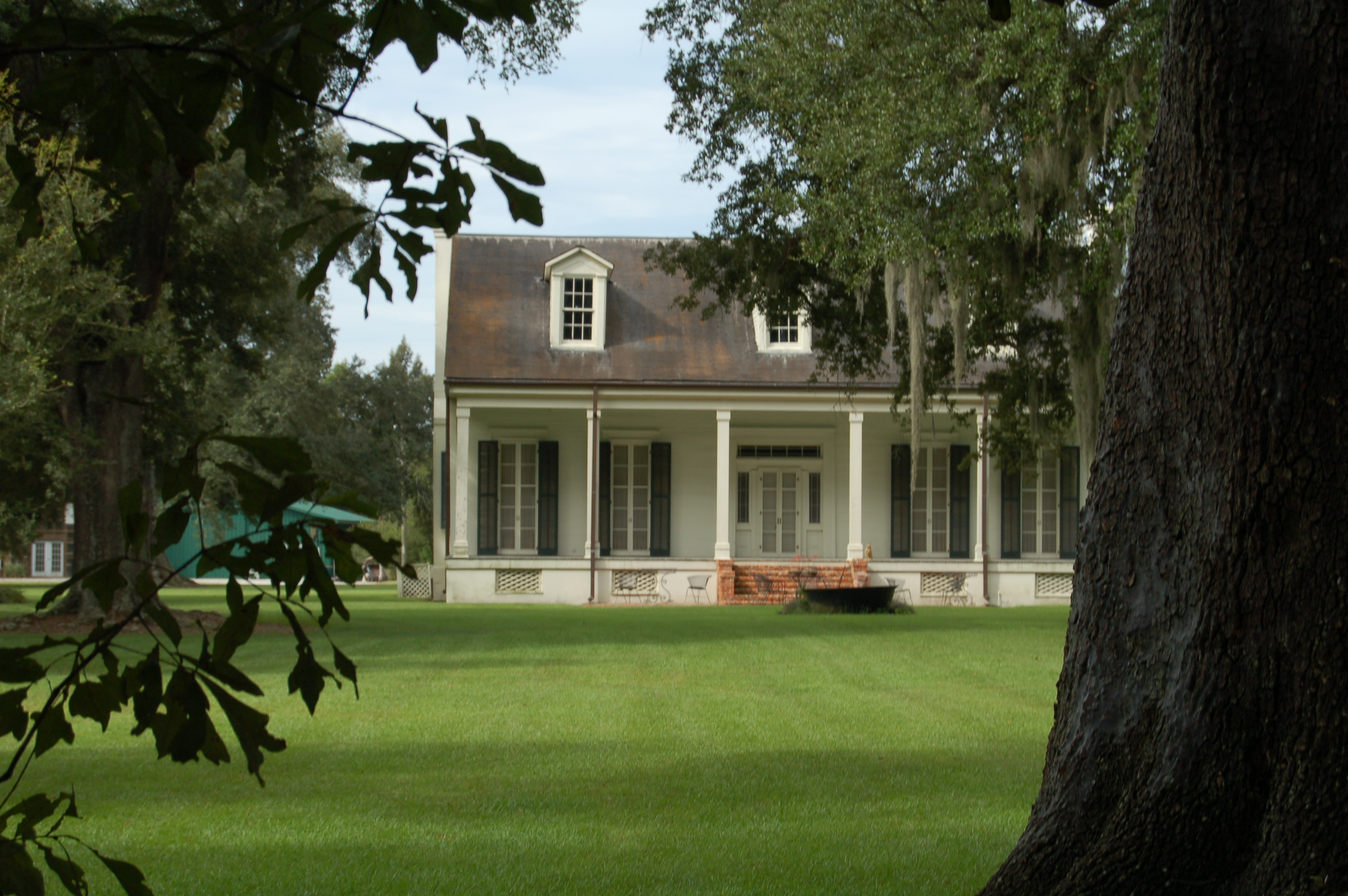
- The El Dorado Plantation House in 2014

- Location within Louisiana Location within the United States
- Nearest city: Livonia, Louisiana, U.S.
- Area: 37 acres (15 ha)
- Built: 1840
- Architectural style: Greek Revival
- NRHP reference No.: 82002791
- Added to NRHP: March 24, 1982

The El Dorado Plantation is a Southern plantation with a historic house located near Livonia, Louisiana, USA. It was designed in the Greek Revival architectural style. It has been listed on the National Register of Historic Places since March 24, 1982.

== See also ==
- List of plantations in Louisiana
- National Register of Historic Places listings in Pointe Coupee Parish, Louisiana
