= Jonas Gaines =

Negro League Baseball player (1914–1998)

- Pitcher
- Born: January 9, 1914; New Roads, Louisiana, U.S.
- Died: August 6, 1998 (aged 84); Baker, Louisiana, U.S.
- Batted: Right Threw: Left

Negro league baseball debut
- 1937, for the Washington Elite Giants

Last appearance
- 1953, for the Hankyu Braves

NPB statistics
- Win–loss record: 14–9
- Earned run average: 2.53
- Strikeouts: 142
- Stats at Baseball Reference

Teams
- Washington Elite Giants (1937); Newark Eagles (1937); Baltimore Elite Giants (1938–1939, 1941–1942, 1944–1948); Hankyu Braves (1953)

Jonas Donald Gaines (January 9, 1914 – August 6, 1998), nicknamed "Lefty", was an American professional baseball pitcher in the Negro leagues. He played professionally from 1937 to 1953 with several teams.

A native of New Roads, Louisiana, Gaines served in the US Army during World War II. He pitched in three East-West All-Star Games; 1942, 1946, and 1950. Gaines also pitched in the Cuban League and the Pacific League. He died in Baker, Louisiana in 1998 at age 84.
