= Austerlitz (Oscar, Louisiana) =

Historic house in Louisiana, United States

- U.S. National Register of Historic Places
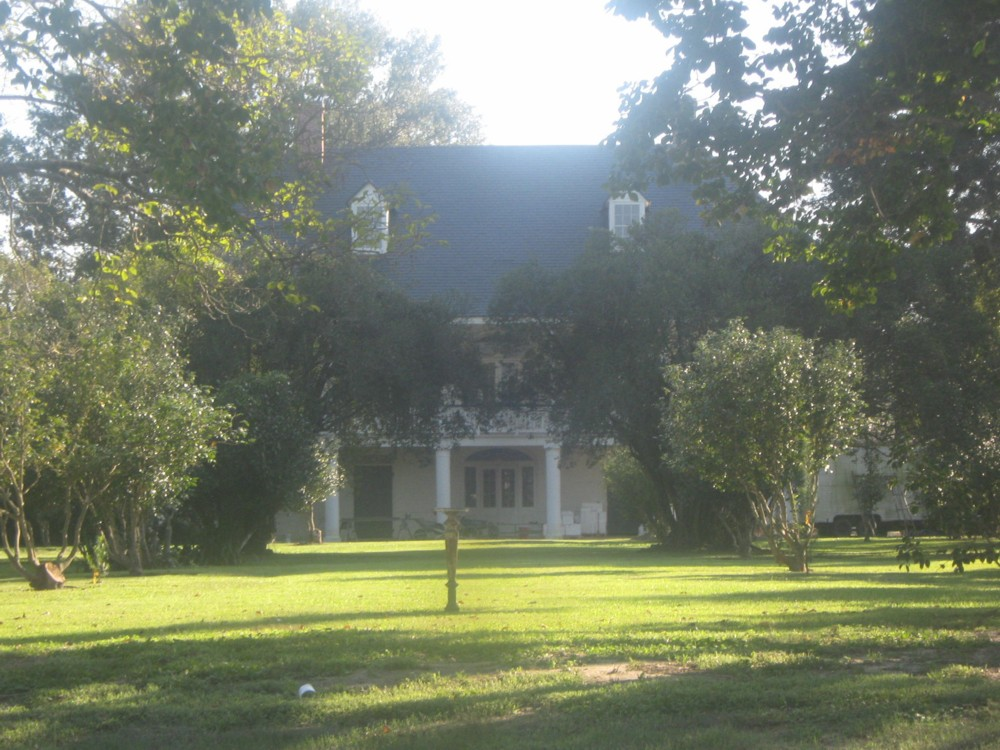

- Location within Louisiana Location within the United States
- Location: Louisiana Highway 1 southeast of its junction with Louisiana Highway 78, near Oscar
- Coordinates: 30°37′15″N 91°28′40″W
- Area: 1.4 acres (0.57 ha)
- Built: 1832
- Architectural style: Federal, French Creole, Central Hallway
- MPS: Louisiana's French Creole Architecture MPS
- NRHP reference No.: 91000416
- Added to NRHP: April 22, 1991

Austerlitz, near Oscar, Louisiana in Pointe Coupee Parish, was built in 1832. The plantation house was listed on the National Register of Historic Places in 1991.

It includes Federal and French Creole architecture with a central hallway.
