= Bohn Motor Company Automobile Dealership =

- U.S. National Register of Historic Places
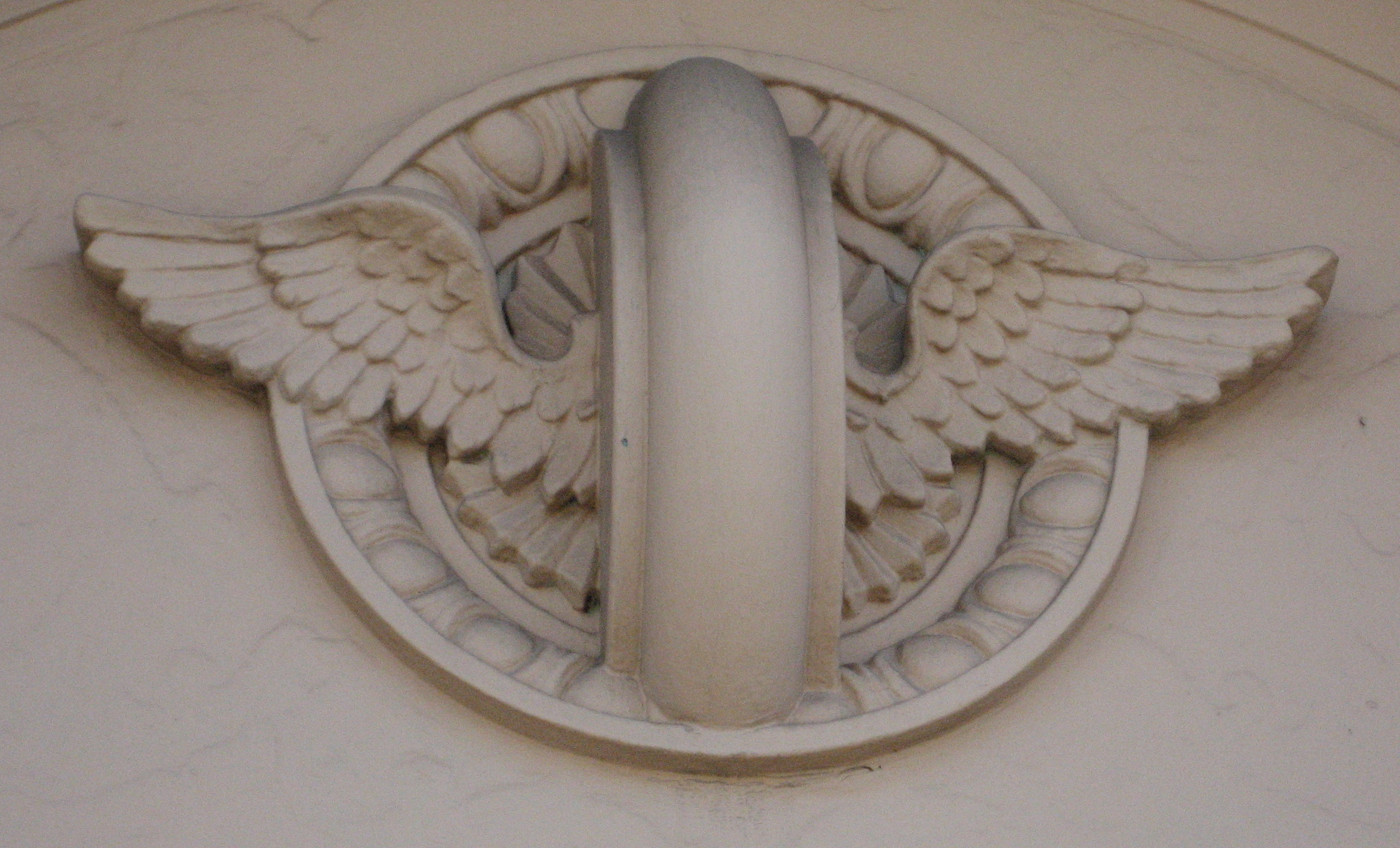

- Location within East New Orleans Location within Louisiana Location within the United States
- Location: 2700 S Broad, New Orleans, Louisiana
- Coordinates: 29°57′03″N 90°05′59″W
- Area: less than one acre
- Built: 1925, 1944-51
- Architect: Emile Weil
- Architectural style: Italianate
- NRHP reference No.: 10001193
- Added to NRHP: February 1, 2011

The Bohn Motor Company Automobile Dealership, at 2700 S Broad in New Orleans, Louisiana, was built in 1925 and was expanded from 1944 to 1951. It was designed by architect Emile Weil (1878-1945). It was listed on the National Register of Historic Places in 2011.

The first story of the building included two automobile showrooms.

== See also ==
- Satterfield Motor Company Building: NRHP-listed in New Roads, Louisiana
- National Register of Historic Places listings in Orleans Parish, Louisiana
