= Preparation for Total Consecration according to Saint Louis de Montfort =

The Preparation for Total Consecration to Jesus Christ through Mary is a 33-day spiritual practice developed by Saint Louis de Montfort in the early 18th century. He outlined this method in his classic work, Treatise on True Devotion to the Blessed Virgin (specifically in paragraphs 227–233), as a way for the faithful to spiritually prepare themselves for a lifetime of consecration. While not originally written as a standalone book, the practice has been widely extracted and published as a devotional booklet by various publishers, most notably Montfort Publications.

Saint Louis dedicated his life to following and praying to the Virgin Mary. His devotion to Mary was even considered "the best and most acceptable form of devotion to Our Lady" by Pope Pius IX. Four of his performed miracles were examined by the Sacred Congregation. Saint Louis de Montfort was canonized by Pope Pius XII on July 20, 1947, over two hundred years after his death. The process took a very long time due to his lack of followers and the unfortunate era in which he died. His two biographies, one by Grandet and the other Father de Clorivière, both dated in the 1700s, which was a time of "immense social and religious upheaval."

== Background Information ==
Saint Louis de Montfort found it his life’s mission to be devoted to Mary. He believed that in order to thoroughly follow Jesus, one had to go through Mary first. To help the faithful enter into the total consecration to Jesus through Mary, he formulated a 33-day period of spiritual exercises aimed at emptying oneself of the spirit of the world and acquiring the spirit of Jesus Christ through the Blessed Virgin.

== Consecration Process ==
The purpose of the consecration is to rid the self of the spirit of the world and to become completely in tune with the lives of Jesus and the Mother Mary. This particular consecration is a thirty-three-day-long process in which the final day falls on a feast day of the Blessed Virgin.

=== Part I: Twelve Preliminary Days ===
The first twelve days of the consecration are set aside as the preliminary days, meant to rid one’s self of all outside hindrances. Saint Louis de Montfort declares that this “part of the preparation should be employed in casting off the spirit of the world which is contrary to that of Jesus Christ.” After a short introduction to the preliminary days is given, Saint Louis provides a list of three prayers that should be said daily. These prayers include Veni Creator, Ave Maris Stella, and the Magnificat. Each day also entails a short meditation meant to be reflected upon before the prayers. The daily meditations tend to include one or two Bible verses accompanied with a couple reflective words from the saint himself.

=== Part II: Knowledge of Self ===
After the twelve days are completed, the consecration moves on to Part II: Knowledge of Self. In this section, Saint Louis de Montfort’s goal for the consecrator is to "consider not so much the opposition that exists between the spirit of Jesus and ours, as the miserable and humiliating state to which our sins have reduced us." The prayers for this period are a bit longer, consisting of the Litany of the Holy Ghost, Litany of the Blessed Virgin, and the Ave Maris Stella.

=== Part III: Knowledge of Mary ===
Once the Knowledge of Self week is complete, the next section of the consecration to be prayed is Part III: Knowledge of Mary. During this period, it is important to reflect upon "the interior life of Mary, namely, her virtues, her sentiments, her actions, her participation in the mysteries of Christ and her union with Him." The prayers said for this section include the same as the previous. However, the consecrator is to say a daily rosary amid everything else. This week is a more challenging part for consecrators, as it leads to an hour to two hours of prayer and reflection.

=== Part IV: Knowledge of Jesus Christ ===
The fourth and final part of Saint Louis de Montfort’s consecration is the Knowledge of Jesus Christ. The prayers for this section include Litany of the Holy Ghost, Ave Maris Stella, Litany of the Holy Name of Jesus, St. Louis de Montfort’s Prayer to Jesus, and O, Jesus Living in Mary. At the finish of the consecration, usually the consecrator is to purchase a chain that can be worn around the wrist as a constant reminder of one’s slave hood to Mary and Jesus; before wearing it, the consecrator has it blessed by a priest. In order for the consecration to be complete, the consecrator must attend Mass on the final day, partake in confession either the week before or after, and do a personal penance for Mary.

== Translations and Variations ==
- 1863 translation from the original French by Reverend Frederick William Faber, D.D.
- 1987 translation by The Montfort Missionaries
- St. Louis de Montfort's Total Consecration to Jesus through Mary - New Easier-to-Read Translation by Scott L. Smith, Jr., Holy Water Books, 2019, ISBN 1-95078-205-0
- 33 Days to Morning Glory variant by Father Michael E. Gaitley

== See also ==
- Treatise on True Devotion to the Blessed Virgin
- Slavery to Mary
- Louis de Montfort
- Saint Louis de Montfort's Prayer to Jesus
- Mariology of the saints
