= Pointe Coupee Parish Courthouse =

- U.S. National Register of Historic Places
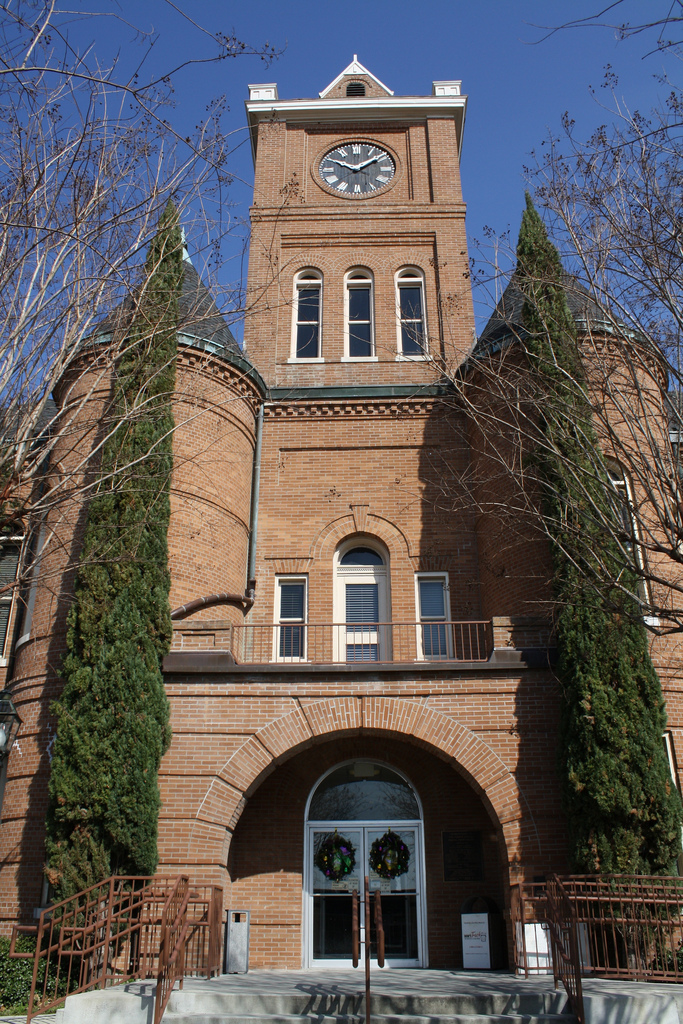

- Location within Louisiana
- Interactive map showing the location of Pointe Coupee Parish Courthouse
- Location: Main St., New Roads, Louisiana
- Coordinates: 30°41′38″N 91°25′57″W
- Area: 1 acre (0.40 ha)
- Built: 1902
- Architect: Andrew J. Bryan
- Architectural style: Romanesque
- NRHP reference No.: 81000710
- Added to NRHP: October 7, 1981

The Pointe Coupee Parish Courthouse is a heritage listed courthouse on Main Street, New Roads, Louisiana, was built in 1902. It was listed on the National Register of Historic Places in 1981.

The two-story brick building is designed in a Romanesque Revival style. The central entrance is located within a broad entry arch, which is flanked by two round turrets. Above the entrance is a four-story square central clock tower, which is topped with an octagonal spire. The architect was Andrew J. Bryan of Jackson, Mississippi, who was "known to have designed the Jefferson County Courthouse (1901) and the Monroe County Jail (1904), both in Mississippi", (the latter is also listed on the National Register). In 1939 a two-storey Art Deco wing was added to the rear of the building.

The building has been the seat of the Pointe Coupee Parish since it was constructed in 1902.
