= Cherie Quarters Cabins =

- U.S. National Register of Historic Places
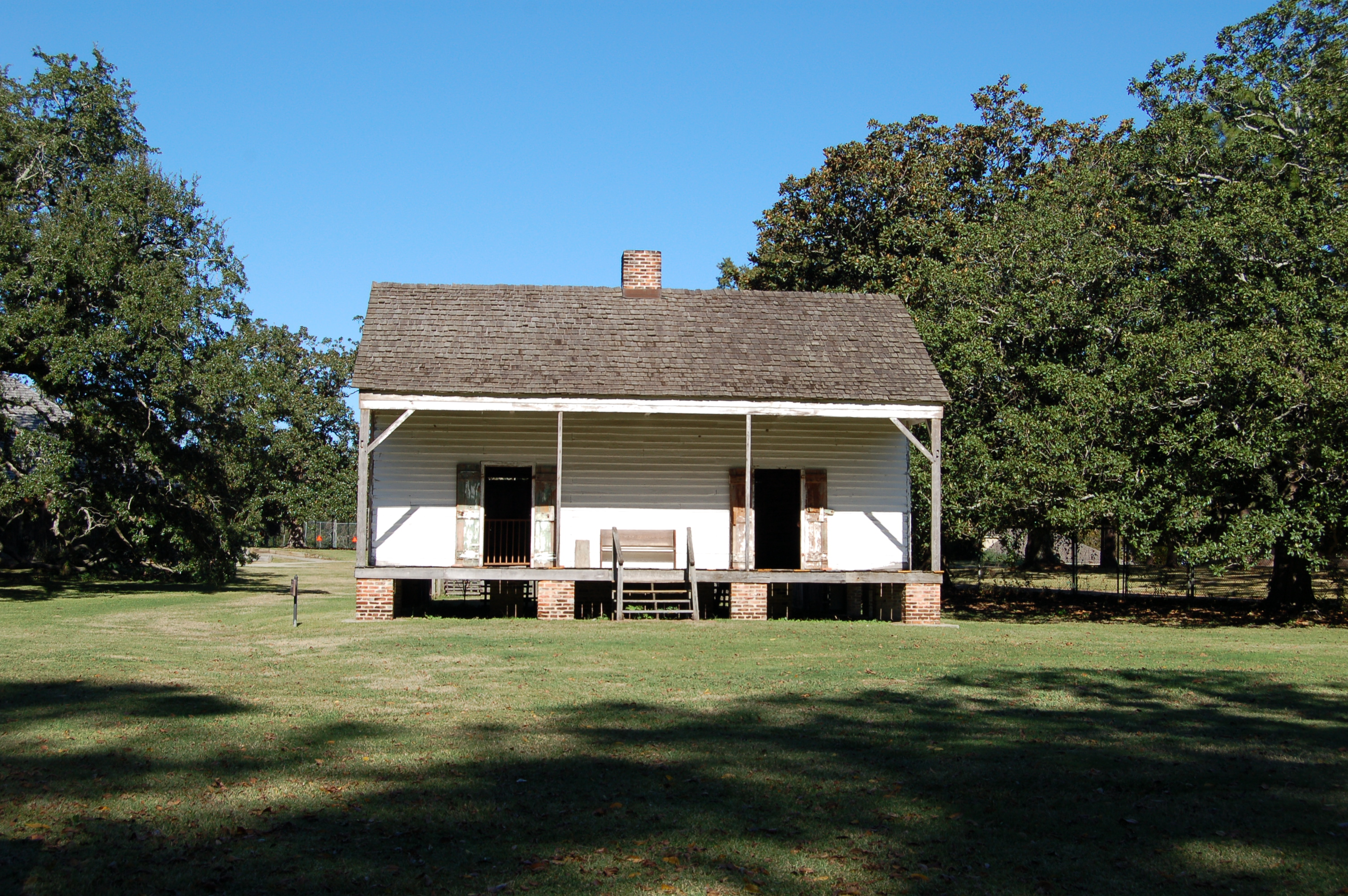

- Location within Louisiana
- Nearest city: Oscar, Louisiana
- Coordinates: 30°36′03″N 91°26′10″W
- Area: 3 acres (1.2 ha)
- Built: c.1820
- NRHP reference No.: 95000470
- Added to NRHP: April 26, 1995

The Cherie Quarters Cabins were two single-story slave cabins which were the only two surviving of thirty or more original cabins on the River Lake (or Riverlake) plantation. Wood-frame buildings supported by brick piers, they were listed on the National Register of Historic Places in 1995. A similar cabin was the childhood home of African-American novelist Ernest J. Gaines.

They were located about 400 feet (120 m) apart on Major Lane, about .5 miles (0.80 km) from its intersection with Louisiana Highway 1, and about .4 miles (0.64 km) south of the main house of the plantation.

Riverlake, the main plantation house, is a raised Creole-style built c.1820, which was listed on the National Register in 1983.
