= Valverda Plantation =

Historic house in Louisiana, United States

- Valverda Plantation House
- U.S. National Register of Historic Places
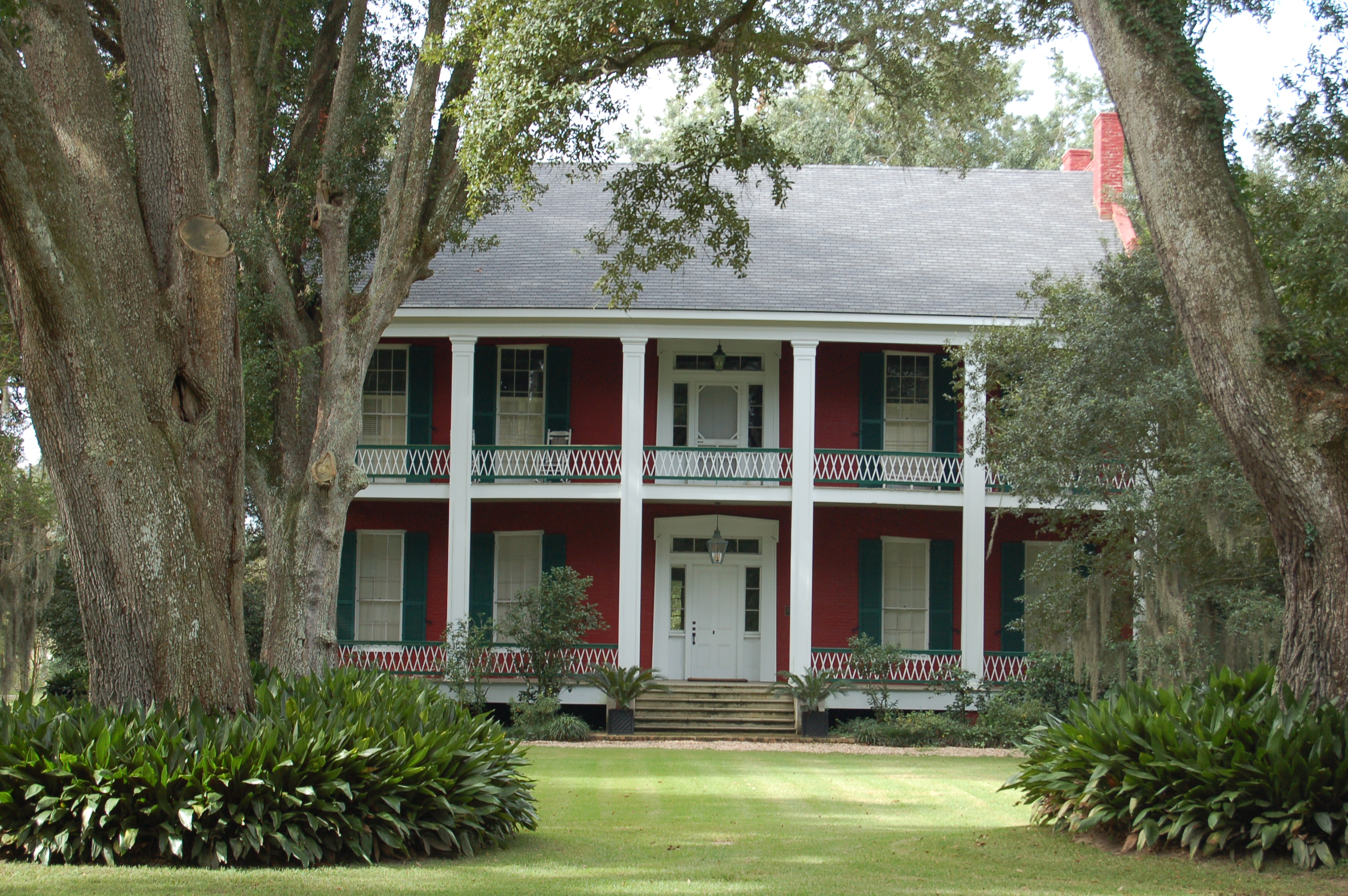

- Location within Louisiana Location within the United States
- Location: 2217 Louisiana Highway 977, near Maringouin, Louisiana, U.S.
- Coordinates: 30°32′19″N 91°32′43″W
- Area: 4.5 acres (1.8 ha)
- Built: 1850
- Architectural style: Greek Revival
- NRHP reference No.: 02000297
- Added to NRHP: April 1, 2002

The Valverda Plantation is a Southern plantation with a historic mansion located in Pointe Coupee Parish, Louisiana, just outside of Maringouin in neighboring Iberville Parish. It was designed in the Greek Revival architectural style, and completed in 1850. It has been listed on the National Register of Historic Places since April 1, 2002.

== See also ==
- List of plantations in Louisiana
- National Register of Historic Places listings in Pointe Coupee Parish, Louisiana
