= Samson House =

- Samson House (Samson-Claiborne House)
- U.S. National Register of Historic Places
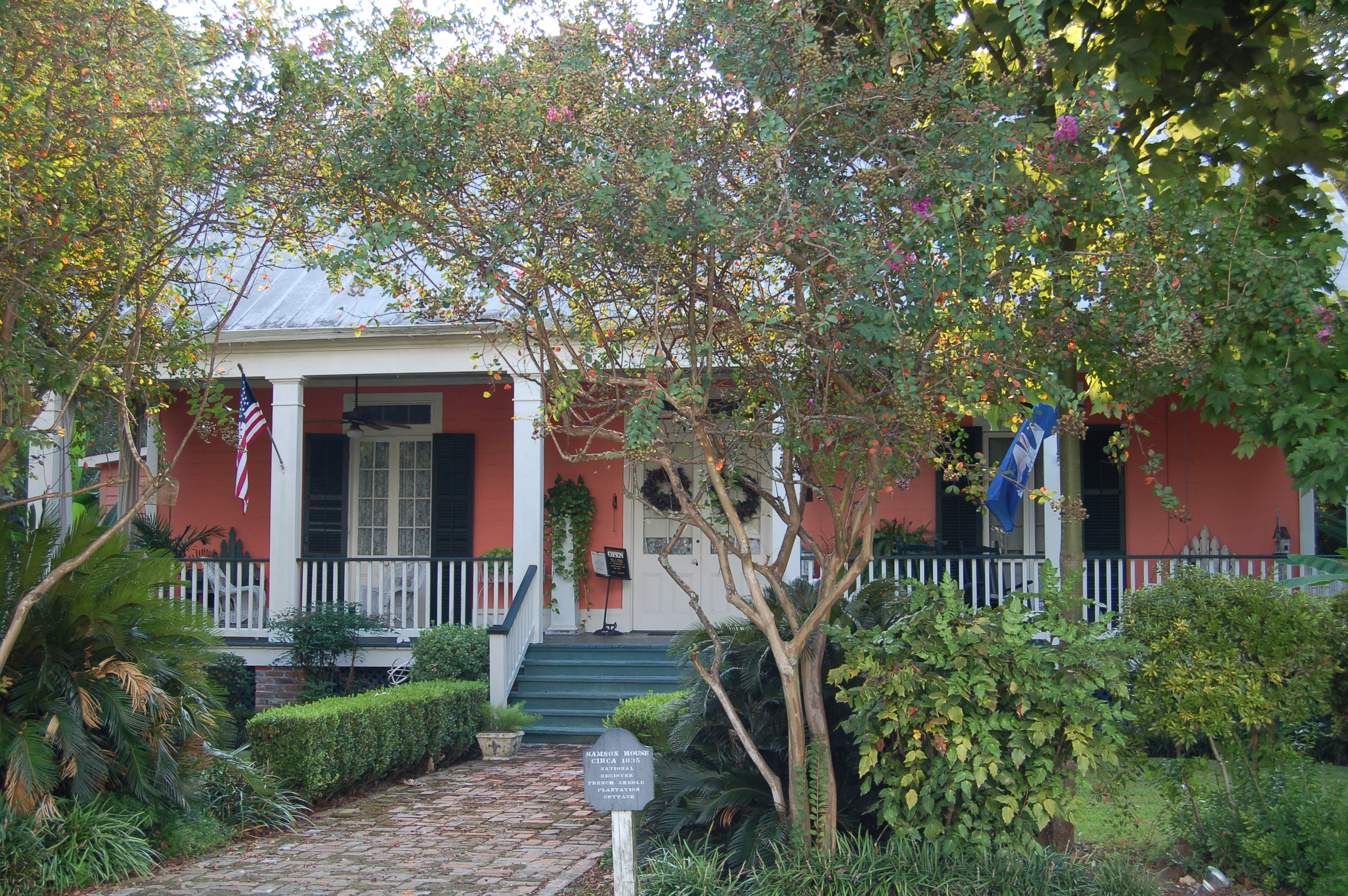

- Location within Louisiana Location within the United States
- Location: 405 Richey Street, New Roads, Louisiana
- Coordinates: 30°41′45″N 91°26′08″W
- Area: less than one acre
- Built: c. 1835
- Architectural style: French Creole
- MPS: Louisiana's French Creole Architecture MPS
- NRHP reference No.: 97001515
- Added to NRHP: December 19, 1997

Samson House is a single-story wooden dwelling, located at 405 Richey Street, New Roads, Louisiana. Built around 1835, it was listed on the National Register of Historic Places in 1997. The building design reflects the French Creole architectural style.

It has also been known as the Samson-Claiborne House.

It was built in the community of Waterloo, Mississippi, which was located on the Mississippi River east of New Roads. The house was moved to New Roads' Main Street in 1884 after floods broke the levee and the community was abandoned. The move was accomplished by mules pulling the house on rolling logs. Then in 1984 it was moved to its current location on Richey Street, which required it to be cut in half then rejoined.
