= Northway Shopping Center =

Shopping center in New York State, U.S.

Northway Mall (former enclosed mall)
- Location: Colonie, New York, United States
- Coordinates: 42°42′21.4″N 73°49′28.5″W
- Opened: October 1970
- Closed: 1998 (indoor) (the last anchor stores closed in 1999)
- Developer: Morris Steinberg of New York City
- Owner: Mall Properties, Inc.
- Num. of anchor tenants: 2
- Floor area: 512,000 sq ft (47,600 m^{2})
- Floors: 1 (store which housed Almart's had two floors)

Northway Shopping Center
- Location: Colonie, New York, United States
- Opened: 1999 (renamed 2012)
- Owner: Mall Properties, Inc.
- Floors: 1

Northway Shopping Center (known as Northway Mall until 2012) is a big box retail center in Colonie, New York, along Central Avenue (NY Route 5). From 1970 to 1998, it was an enclosed shopping mall with several out buildings. It is located across Central Avenue from Colonie Center, an enclosed shopping mall.

== Enclosed mall (1970-1998) ==
The mall, which had no fountain, and only one floor for its inner complex, was alleged to have been referred to as "modern as tomorrow".

=== Development ===
Fifty-nine acres (24 ha) of land was purchased in fall, 1968 from the city of Albany for a price of $1.2 million. The purchaser was developer Morris Steinberg of the city of New York. The property was originally part of Albany's waterworks property. It had been a protected part of the Albany Pine Bush from 1850. The development of Northway Mall helped to spur further development along nearby Wolf Road.

A hearing at the Colonie Planning Board was scheduled for July 8, 1969 for a proposed subdivision for the mall. A meeting between the Town of Colonie Planning Board, the Village of Colonie Planning Commission, and representatives of the developers took place on August 19, 1969, where partial approval was given to begin preliminary work. Work to level the land had actually commenced prior to that date. A hearing at the Colonie Town Zoning Board was scheduled for 5:15pm on September 17, 1970, regarding mall signage. A variance had to be requested because the size of the proposed signs was larger than was allowed by zoning laws at the time.

The construction contract for the Almart's Store was held by Panzieri-Henderson, Inc., while AVR Construction Co. was contracted for Korvette's. L.A. Swyer, Inc., of Albany, held the construction contract for the smaller stores between the two anchors. Steel for the center was purchased from James McKinney & Sons, Inc., of Albany. The mall was once known as the "Off Price Center." However, the owners moved away from that term by late 1989; they opted to use the word "value" instead.

=== Initial tenants ===
Initial plans called for the south end of the mall to have a single-level E. J. Korvette Store at 140,000 square feet. Korvette's opened on October 15, 1970. The Almart Store, a division of Allied Stores Corp., would be at the north end of the mall consisting of two stores and 150,000 square feet (14,000 m^{2}), plus 15,000 square feet (1,400 m^{2}) for outdoor items such as greenhouse supplies. It opened on October 8, 1970, being the first store in the mall to open. About 30 smaller stores were planned between the two anchors.

A 31,500-square-foot (2,930 m^{2}) Woolworth's store was announced prior to the opening of the mall.

On October 21, 1969, the National Commercial Bank and Trust Co. of Albany was approved by the United States Comptroller of the Currency to open a branch in the mall.

Tico Bonomo, former owner of Bonomo's Turkish Taffy, established the first Time-Out Family Amusement Center in the Northway Mall in 1970 and was one of its very first tenants. The Time-Out Tunnel, as it came to be known, turned into a chain of mall arcades throughout the Northeast in the 1970s and 1980s. The Time-Out Tunnel at Nothway Mall remained in operation through the end of December 1998 when the mall was finally closed. The Time-Out Tunnel therefore has the distinction of being a tenant from the mall's inception right through the very end of its existence as an enclosed mall.

=== St. Francis Chapel ===
A long-time tenant at Northway Mall was St. Francis Chapel, a Catholic Franciscan chapel, sponsored by the Holy Name Province of the Order Friars Minor. Apart from a sanctuary, it had a front counter staffed by a priest, and a consultation where anyone, Catholic or otherwise, could receive guidance from members of the clergy. It was located on the western side of the mall between Almart's and the Motherhood Maternity Shop. Like any other store in the mall, they paid rent based on square footage, at retail rates.

Thirty-five people attended the opening of the chapel without any announcement or advertising. In the initial days since it opened, an average of 500 people visited the chapel. While furnishings were waitng to be received, nearby stores loaned items to be used in thechapel. Masses took place at 10am, 12:10pm, and 5:10pm on weekdays. Mass times at ten minutes after the hour were intended to accommodate store employee lunch or dinner breaks.

Fr. Fabian Joyce, ordained 1943, came from Worcester, Massachusetts, and had been serving at Our Lady's Chapel in New Bedford, Massachusetts for the six years prior to becoming rector of St. Francis Chapel. After a few years at the mall, Fr. Joyce suggested that the location has brought people back to the faith.

On March 10, 1971, the Most Rev. Bishop Broderick, D.D., of the Albany, New York Catholic Diocese, blessed the altar of St. Francis Chapel in a concelebrated dedication Massachusetts. It was estimated that approximately 25,000 people had visited the chapel between its unofficial opening in late December 1970 and its official dedication.

By the late 1970s, Masses were being held four times per day. Eight Masses were held on Saturdays. Weekday masses attracted 30 to 40 people while Saturday vigil Masses for Sunday obligation attracted around 200. The chapel in the mall attracted people from many faiths.

=== Decline ===
Only about 10 years after the mall opened, initial major anchors Almart's and Korvette's, closed. In 1983, the space formerly occupied by Korvette's was developed into an area for small discount stores. However, this did not prove successful.

In 1995, the mall owners spent $2 million to upgrade the look of the mall with new foliage and designs. This did not attract new tenants.

By October 12, 1997, the only restaurant left in the mall was Ario's Pizza, after Rick's Cafe closed a few days prior.

On October 10, 1997, anchor Montgomery Ward announced it would be closing its anchor store at the Northway Mall along with stores at other locations. (The store closing in Northway Mall was completed in January 1998.) Also in 1997, anchors Lechmere (chain owned by Montgomery Ward by March 31, 1994), and Woolworth's closed their stores in the mall. By October 1997, there was space for 40 stores; however, only half had tenants. Despite this, a spokesman for the mall's owner indicated in October 1997 that demolition was not being considered.

By December 1998, less than 12 stores remained open. The mall would close at the end of 1998. In December 1998, some store owners complained of only being given thirty days' notice of the closure. Due to having a lease, Marshalls remained in the mall into 1999.

=== Demolition ===
Demolition of most of the mall began in May, 1999. In comments published a year after demolition, a spokesman for the mall's owner pointed out that the mall was not large enough to compete with newer, modern malls. The space housing David's Bridal would remain as a free-standing building.

== Big Box Center (1999 - present) ==
=== Development ===
The portion of the original enclosed mall housing David's Bridal would remain as a detached building while free standing buildings housing multiple stores would be built behind. The developers needed a variance from the Town of Colonie Planning Board. This was given in December 1998.

=== Initial anchor/tenants ===
- Target (anchor)
- David's Bridal
- Jo-Ann etc. (moved to new building, switched to larger Jo-Ann etc. format)
- Linens n' Things (closed)
- Marshalls
- Eddie Bauer Outlet
- Dress Barn

=== Closing of Cine 10 ===
The Hoyt's Cine 10 movie theaters, in operation for over 20 years, did not renew their lease; the lease ended in August 2000. The theatre was in a free-standing building consisting of 23,000 square feet (2,100 m^{2}); beginning in 1993, it switched to second-run movies at a reduced rate. The building was 30 years old (as of 2000), had 10 screens and 2,000 seats. It was suggested that competition from other Hoyt's theaters reduced the profits of this specific cinema.
