= Brian J. Costello =

American historian

- Born: Brian James Costello; December 28, 1966 (age 59); Baton Rouge, Louisiana, United States
- Education: Louisiana State University
- Occupations: Historian, author, archivist
- Writing career
- Genres: Non-fiction, History, Linguistics, Spirituality, Genealogy

Brian James Costello (born December 28, 1966) is an American historian, author, archivist and humanitarian. He is an 11th generation resident of New Roads, Louisiana, seat of Pointe Coupee Parish. He is three-quarters French and one-quarter Italian in ancestry.

== Education ==
He graduated from False River Academy in New Roads and from Louisiana State University in Baton Rouge, Louisiana, with a major in History and minor in English. He is one of the few remaining speakers of Louisiana Creole French, having been immersed in childhood in the dialect spoken in Pointe Coupee Parish and is internationally regarded as an advocate of the Louisiana Creole people

== Work ==
Costello is one of Louisiana's most published figures, having published as many as four books in one year. He is the sole author of 19 books, co-author of six books and numerous newspaper columns and features since 1987. Among his co-authored works are Furnishing Louisiana: Creole and Acadian Furniture, 1735-1835, published by The Historic New Orleans Collection, and New Roads and Old Rivers: Louisiana's Historic Pointe Coupee Parish, published by LSU Press. He was editor of The Pointe Coupee Banner newspaper in New Roads, Louisiana during 1988-1996.

He holds membership in the Catholic Writers' Guild, numerous spiritual and charitable apostolates and has been recognized as an outstanding advocate of the Lions International charitable works since 1993. He has served as president of Le Cercle Historique, a historical preservation and archival organization, since its founding in 1992.

Costello is a Louisiana Carnival historian and advocate, having been active in the preservation and growth of New Roads and New Orleans Carnival krewes, historical documentation and Mardi Gras parade orchestration since 1993. He was chairman of the New Roads Lions Carnival parade from 1993 though 2010, and reigned as King of the Carnival in 2009.

In 2009, Costello was named founding historian and archivist of the Historic Materials Collection of the Pointe Coupee Parish Library in New Roads, Louisiana. He is often featured as a consultant and documentary participant in the fields of American and European genealogy, history, culture, linguistics, antiquities and spirituality with local, national and global audiences.

In recognition of his cultural and spiritual works, Costello was knighted by the Military and Hospitaller Order of Saint Lazarus of Jerusalem. in 2015, and by the Equestrian Order of the Holy Sepulchre of Jerusalem in 2019.

== Bibliography ==
=== Sole author ===
- New Roads: A Community in Retrospect. Claitor's, 1993.
- Chronicles of Carnival: A History of the New Roads Mardi Gras. Claitor's, 1993.
- The Catholic Church in Pointe Coupée, A Faith Journey. Franklin Press, 1996.
- Louisiana Mardi Gras, A Historical Guide to the State’s Carnival Parades Outside New Orleans. Franklin Press, 1997.
- A History of Pointe Coupée Parish, Louisiana. Franklin Press, first edition 1999, second edition 2005.
- The Life, Family and Legacy of Julien Poydras. Franklin Press, 2001.
- From Ternant to Parlange: A Creole Plantation Through Seven Generations. Franklin Press, 2002.
- From Porche to Labatut: Two Centuries on the Pointe Coupée Coast. Franklin Press, 2002.
- Creole Pointe Coupée, A Sociological Analysis. Franklin Press, 2002.
- The House of Lejeune. Franklin Press, 2002.
- A History of Carnival in Louisiana New Roads Printing, 2003.
- Darby: A House and Family on Spanish Lake. New Roads Printing, 2003.
- Quintessential Creoles: The Tounoir Family of Pointe Coupée. New Roads Printing, 2003.
- Canal Street and Beyond: Louisiana’s 20th Century Department Stores. New Roads Printing, 2003.
- C’est Ca Ye’ Dit: Creole Folk Tales, Superstitions, Remedies, Customs, Nicknames and Linguistic Peculiarities of Pointe Coupée Parish, Louisiana. New Roads Printing, 2004.
- Rolling for Charity: A Pictorial History of the New Roads Lions Carnival Parade. New Roads Printing, 2004.
- Desolation Unmeasured… The Tragic History of Floods in Pointe Coupée Parish, Louisiana. New Roads Printing, 2007.
- A History of Pointe Coupée Parish, Louisiana, The Murray G. LeBeau Memorial Edition. Margaret Media, 2010.
- Carnival in Louisiana: Celebrating Mardi Gras from the French Quarter to the Red River, Louisiana State University Press, 2015.
- And I Saw a River: A History of the Catholic Church in Pointe Coupée, St. Mary of False River & St. Francis Chapel, Holy Water Books, 2023.

=== Collaborative works ===
- Holden, Jack D.; Bacot, H. Parrott; Gontar, Cybèle T.; Costello, Brian J.; Puig, Francis J. (2010). Furnishing Louisiana: Creole and Acadian Furniture, 1735-1835. New Orleans: The Historic New Orleans Collection. ISBN 9780917860560. OCLC 663102422.
- Sexton, Richard; Harelson, Randy; Costello, Brian J. (2012). New Roads and Old Rivers: Authentic Old Louisiana in Pointe Coupée Parish. LSU Press. ISBN 978-0807145449.
- LaFleur, John II; Costello, Brian; Fandrich, Ina (2013). Louisiana's French Creole Culinary and Linguistic Heritage: Facts vs. Fiction Before and Since Cajunization. Munich: BookRix. ISBN 9783730909980.
- Lafleur, John II (3 March 2021). Speaking in Tongues: Louisiana's Colonial French, Creole and Cajun Languages Tell Their Story. Amazon Digital Services LLC - KDP Print US. ISBN 979-8576062003.
- Costello, Brian J.; Smith, Scott L. Jr. (February 2018). Blessed Is He Who ...: Models of Catholic Manhood. Holy Water Books. ISBN 978-0-99836-034-8.
- Costello, Brian J.; Mills-Nichol, Carol (2022). Dry Goods, Cotton and Cane: 250 Years of Jewish Life, Business and Agriculture in Pointe Coupee Parish, Louisiana. Janaway Publishing. ISBN 978-1-59641-469-3.
