= The Badge =

- Directed by: Robby Henson
- Written by: Robby Henson
- Produced by: John Morrissey
- Starring: Billy Bob Thornton; Patricia Arquette; William Devane
- Cinematography: Irek Hartowicz
- Edited by: Michael J. Duthie
- Music by: David Bergeaud
- Production companies: Emmett/Furla Films; Millennium Films; Nu Image Films; Propaganda Films; The Turman-Morrissey Company
- Distributed by: Millennium Films; Gold Circle Films; Starz! Network; Lions Gate Films
- Release date: September 7, 2002
- Running time: 103 minutes
- Country: United States
- Language: English

The Badge is a 2002 mystery-thriller film directed by Robby Henson and starring Billy Bob Thornton, Patricia Arquette and William Devane.

== Release ==
The Badge was originally intended to be distributed by Propaganda Films, but the production company went bankrupt during the film's post-production. It was later released on DVD by Lionsgate Films.

== Synopsis ==
La Salle Parish, Louisiana Sheriff Darl Hardwick investigates the controversial local murder of a transgender woman, with the highly sensitive matter being concealed as much as possible by the parish's most influential figures, such figures even going so far as to frame Hardwick for statutory rape involving a local waitress. With his career as sheriff at an end, Hardwick takes a personal stake in the investigation after becoming acquainted with Scarlett, the victim's widow. Hardwick heads down a somewhat reckless path to understanding the victim's world, reconciliation for past sins, and a series of dark truths within the parish itself.

== Reception ==
The Badge holds a 33% rating on review aggregation website Rotten Tomatoes, based on six reviews.

== Cast ==
- Billy Bob Thornton as Sheriff Darl Hardwick
- Patricia Arquette as Scarlett
- William Devane as The Judge
- Sela Ward as Carla Hardwick
- Julie Hagerty as Sister Felicia
- Marcus Lyle Brown as Deputy Jackson
- Ray McKinnon as Deputy C.B.
- Tom Bower as Bull Hardwick
- Thomas Haden Church as David Hardwick
- Jena Malone as Ashley Hardwick
- Audrey Marie Anderson as Teenage Waitress
- John McConnell as Ornell
- J.C. Sealy as Rhonda Hebert
- Ron Flagge as Gooch
- Huey Alexander as Cletus
- Deana Carter as Sherry
- Mark Krasnoff as Squeegee
- Cindy Roubal as Mona
- Njema Williams as Gator
- Jerry Leggio as Henry
- Michael Hitchcock as Luna

== Filming locations ==
- Baton Rouge, Louisiana
- Donaldsonville, Louisiana
- Iberville Parish, Louisiana
- Pointe Coupee Parish, Louisiana
- New Orleans, Louisiana
- Jarreau, Louisiana
