= Donald Calloway =

American Catholic priest and author (born 1972)

The Reverend Father Donald Calloway
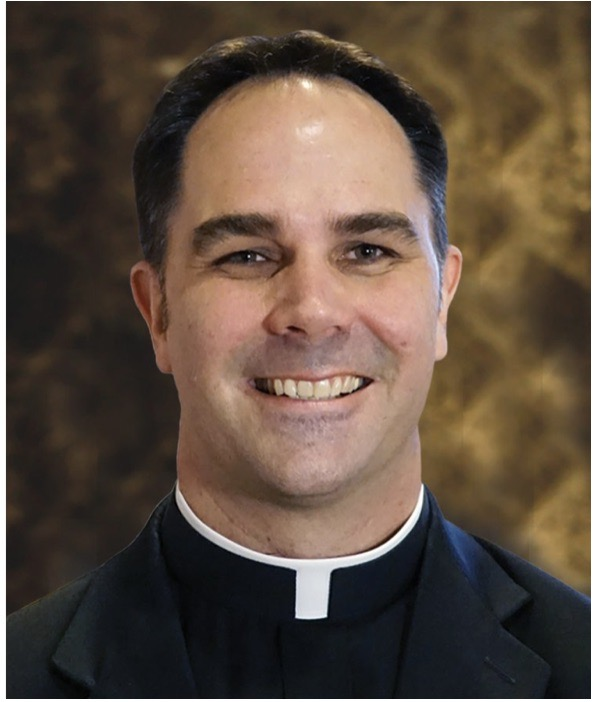
- Church: Catholic Church

Orders
- Ordination: May 31, 2003

Personal details
- Born: Donald H. Calloway; June 29, 1972 (age 54) Dearborn, Michigan, U.S.

Donald Calloway, MIC (born 29 June 1972) is an American author and Catholic priest in the Congregation of Marian Fathers of the Immaculate Conception of the Most Blessed Virgin Mary. He is known for his conversion story and his 2020 book, Consecration to St. Joseph: The Wonders of Our Spiritual Father, which has been translated into more than 28 languages.

== Early life ==
Calloway was born on June 29, 1972, in Dearborn, Michigan. He spent his early years in West Virginia and grew up in southern California, in Los Angeles and San Diego. He has described himself as drug addicted in his teenage years and a high school dropout. He has said that he was using drugs by the age of 11 and was promiscuous.

While living in Japan as a teenager, Calloway claims to have been involved with the Yakuza, the Japanese mafia, and served as a "drug runner", running drugs and money to casinos in Honshu. When he was 15 years old, Calloway was forcibly removed from Japan for his criminal activity and mafia involvement.

Following his extradition back to the United States, Calloway claims to have been committed to two drug and alcohol rehabilitation centers in Pennsylvania: New Beginnings at Cove Forge and Charter Fairmont Institute. After his failed rehabilitations, he was imprisoned in Louisiana upon turning eighteen.

One night after declining to go out with friends, Calloway began to read a book about the Blessed Virgin Mary. He credits this book, as well as praying the Rosary, with changing his life, after which he converted to Roman Catholicism.

== Priesthood ==
Calloway was ordained a priest on May 31, 2003 at The National Shrine of The Divine Mercy in Stockbridge, Massachusetts. He has a B.A. (Franciscan University of Steubenville), M.Div. (Dominican House of Studies, Washington, DC), S.T.B. (Dominican House of Studies, Washington, DC) and a S.T.L. (International Marian Research Institute, Dayton, Ohio). He practices with the Congregation of Marian Fathers of the Immaculate Conception of the Most Blessed Virgin Mary.

Calloway had led pilgrimages to Marian shrines, including sites in Poland, Mexico, Italy, Spain, and France, as well as to the Holy Land with actor Jim Caviezel.

== Career and recognition ==
In 2020, Calloway's authored the book Consecration to St. Joseph: The Wonders of Our Spiritual Father which sold more than one million copies worldwide. Calloway has said that his book is modeled after the Consecration to Mary of St. Louis de Montfort.

Calloway also published a follow-up entitled Consecration to St. Joseph for Children and Families with co-author Scott L. Smith, Jr. in 2022.

Calloway's conversion story was made into a documentary titled The Testimony of Fr. Donald Calloway, which won an Emmy award in 2017.

A talk Calloway gave in April 2017 at Franciscan University of Steubenville, titled "The Rosary: Spiritual Sword of Our Lady", had over 2.9 million views on YouTube by October 2025.

== Bibliography ==
Calloway is the author of a number of books related to Catholic Church and Roman Catholicism. His work has been covered in several mainstream Catholic Church and Roman Catholic newspapers.

- The Immaculate Conception in the Life of the Church (2004)
- The Virgin Mary and Theology of the Body (2005)
- No Turning Back: A Witness to Mercy (2007)
- Purest of All Lilies: The Virgin Mary in the Spirituality of St. Faustina (2008)
- Under the Mantle: Marians Thoughts from a 21st Century Priest (2013)
- Marian Gems: Daily Wisdom on Our Lady (2014)
- Mary of Nazareth: The Life of Our Lady in Pictures (2014)
- Eucharistic Gems: Daily Wisdom on the Most Blessed Sacrament (2023)
- 30 Day Eucharistic Revival: A Retreat with St. Peter Julian Eymard (2024)
- Sacred Heart Gems: Daily Wisdom on the Heart of Jesus (2024)
- Bible Gems: Scripture Verses of God’s Mercy and Overcoming Fear (2024)
- Passion Gems: Daily Wisdom on the Suffering, Cross, and Death of Jesus (2025)
- Virtues of the Saints: 15 Heavenly Habits for Children (2025)
- 33 Days to the Holy Family: Consecration to Jesus, Mary, and Joseph with co-author Scott L. Smith Jr. (2025)
- The Lamb of God: The Story of Our Lady of Knock (forthcoming 2026)

Books on the Rosary:

- How to Pray the Rosary (2017)
- 26 Champions of the Rosary: The Essential Guide to the Greatest Heroes of the Rosary (2017)
- 10 Wonders of the Rosary (2019)
- Rosary Gems: Daily Wisdom on the Holy Rosary (2015)
- Champions of the Rosary (2016)

Books on St. Joseph:

- St. Joseph Gems: Daily Wisdom on Our Spiritual Father (2018)
- Consecration to St. Joseph: The Wonders of Our Spiritual Father (2020)
- Consecration to St. Joseph for Children and Families with co-author Scott L. Smith, Jr. (2022)
- The Chaste Heart of St. Joseph: A Graphic Novel (2023)
- Litany of St. Joseph Coloring Book (2024)
- Chaste Heart Gems: Daily Wisdom on the Heart of St. Joseph (Marian Press, 2025)

== See also ==
- Catholic Mariology
- Josephology
