= St. Stephen's Episcopal Church (Innis, Louisiana) =

Historic church in Louisiana, United States

- U.S. National Register of Historic Places
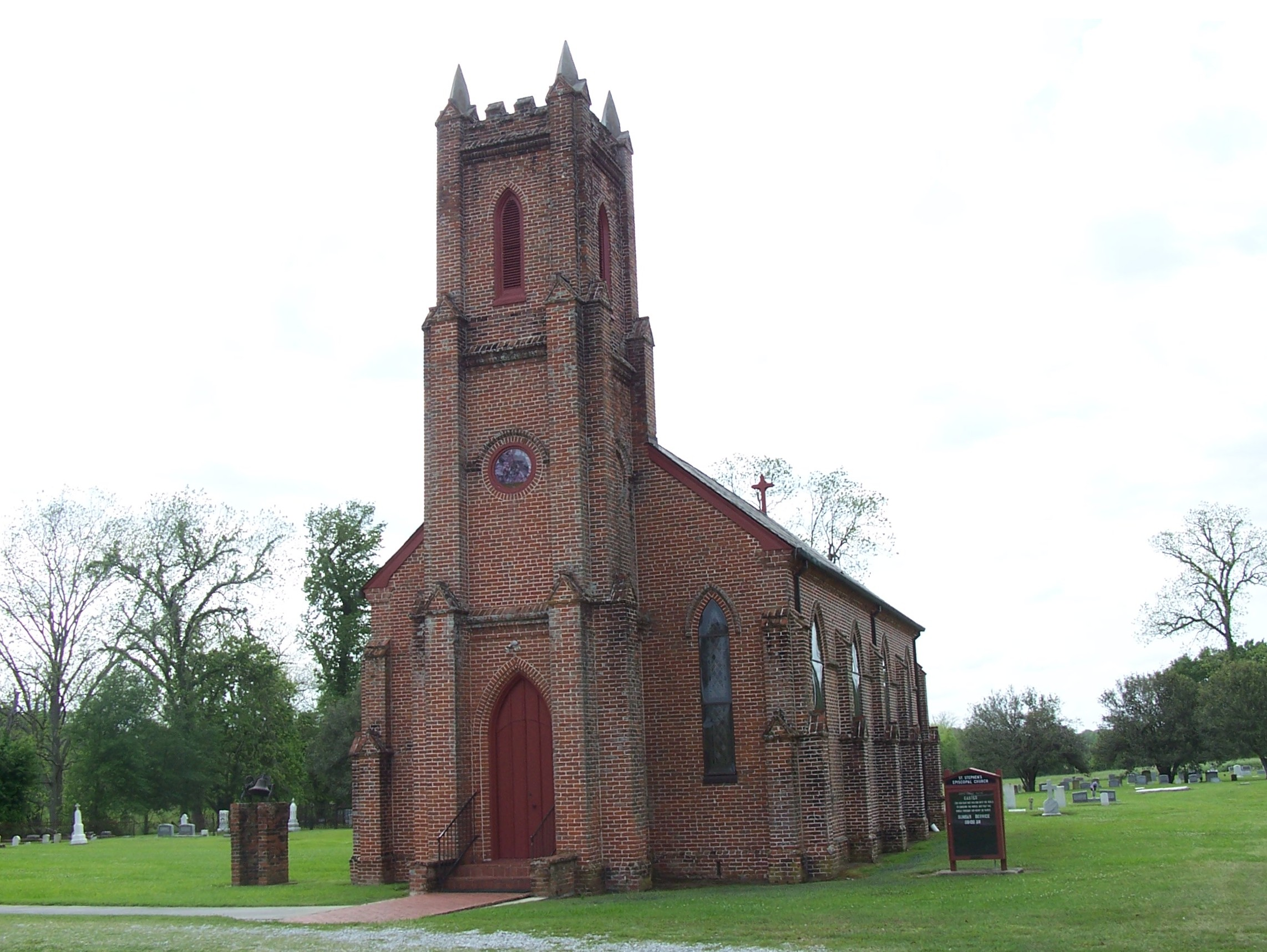

- Location within Louisiana Location within the United States
- Location: 9795 Louisiana Highway 418; Innis, Louisiana
- Coordinates: 30°53′52″N 91°40′9″W
- Built: 1848
- Architect: Wills, J.A.
- Architectural style: Gothic Revival
- NRHP reference No.: 74000939
- Added to NRHP: April 24, 1974

St. Stephen's Episcopal Church is a historic church in Innis, Louisiana, United States. The church was built in 1848 and was consecrated by Bishop Leonidas Polk. It is the oldest brick edifice in Pointe Coupee Parish. Past communicants include Major General John Archer Lejeune and Dr. Tichenor. It is also home to a cemetery with a monument to a Confederate Unknown Soldier, erected in 1901. This church was listed on the National Register of Historic Places on April 24, 1974 with the help of Father Lyle Franklin Parratt who was the priest there at the time.

St. Stephen's Episcopal Church is an active parish in the Episcopal Diocese of Louisiana. The Rev. John Miller now serves as Priest-in-Charge.

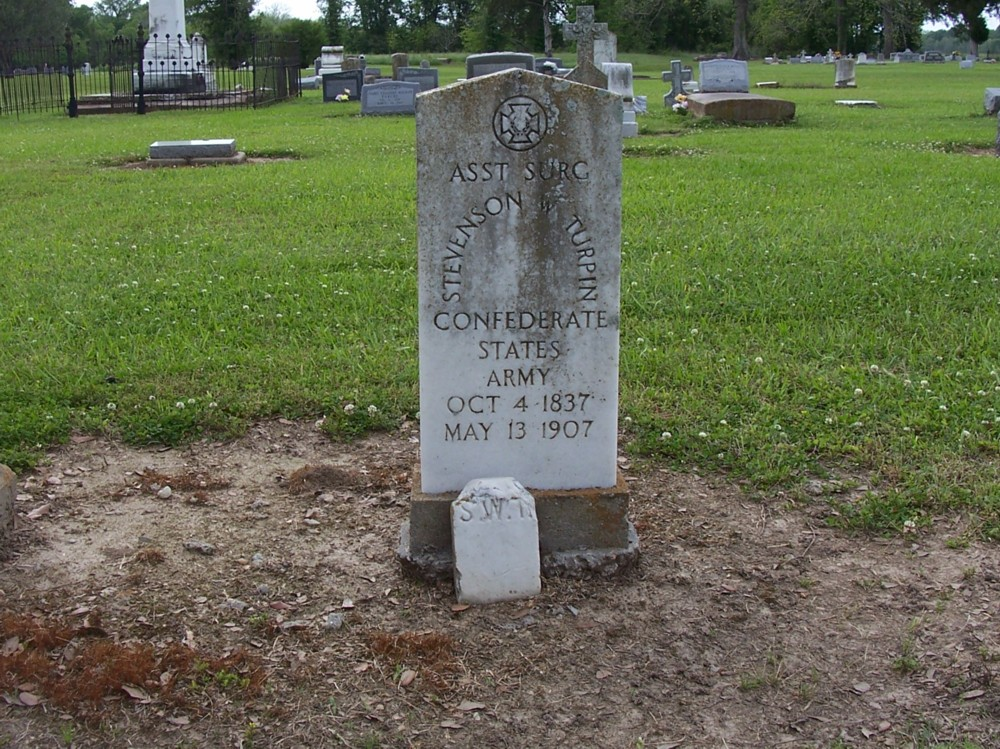
Confederate grave stone at cemetery with Southern Cross of Honor symbol displayed at top

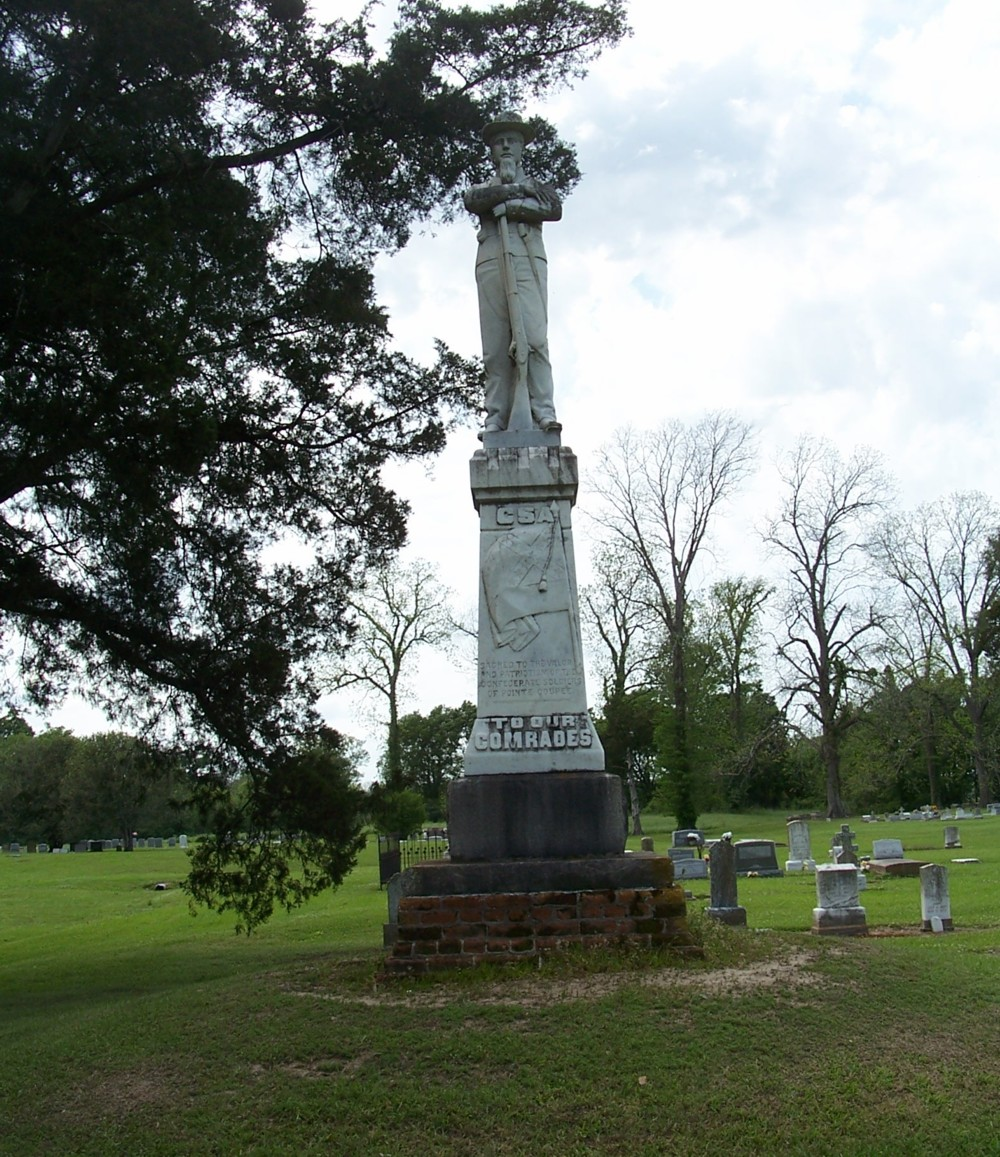
Confederate Monument
