= Innis, Louisiana =

Unincorporated community in Louisiana

Innis
- Unincorporated community
- Location of Innis in Louisiana
- Coordinates: 30°52′41″N 91°40′50″W
- Country: United States
- State: Louisiana
- Parish: Pointe Coupee
- Elevation: 43 ft (13 m)
- Time zone: UTC-6 (CST)
  - Summer (DST): UTC-5 (CDT)
- ZIP code: 70747
- Area code: 225
- GNIS feature ID: 554834

Innis is an unincorporated community in upper Pointe Coupee Parish, Louisiana, United States. It is the home of the now defunct Innis High School. Historic St. Stephen's Episcopal Church is located nearby. This community's zip code is 70747.

== History ==
The community was named for James Innis. Like thousands of Irishmen, Innis came to America during the 1850s when Ireland was faced with the Great Famine. In 1868, Innis purchased property in the area that now bears his name. In 1895, a post office was established in the town.
