= St. Francis Chapel (New Roads, Louisiana) =

Historic church in Louisiana, United States

- U.S. National Register of Historic Places
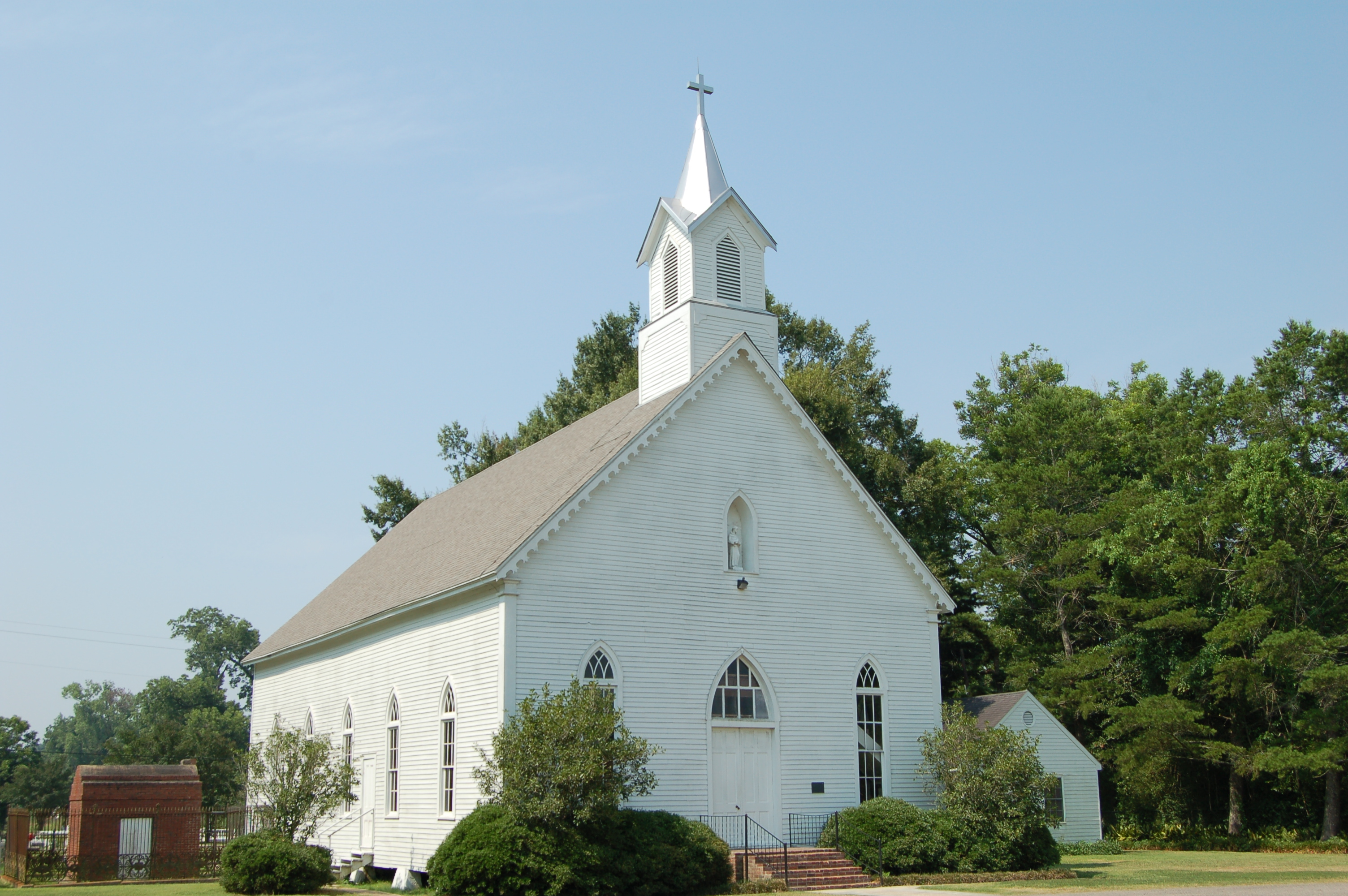

- Location within Louisiana Location within the United States
- Nearest city: New Roads, Louisiana
- Coordinates: 30°43′45″N 91°29′12″W
- Area: less than one acre
- Built: 1895
- Architectural style: Gothic
- NRHP reference No.: 79001082
- Added to NRHP: May 25, 1979

The St. Francis Chapel (French: La chapelle Saint-François) in New Roads, Louisiana, also known as Saint Francis of Pointe Coupee, is a Gothic building built in 1894–95. It was listed on the National Register of Historic Places in 1979. It is the third church with this name built in Pointe Coupee. The first was built in 1738 and was the first permanent church in the region. The second church was built next to the Fort of Pointe Coupee and was dedicated on the Feast of St. Francis in 1760. Because of erosion of the river bank, it was dismantled in 1891, and its location and graveyard were lost to the river. The third church was built at a different location, incorporating many of the furnishings and fixtures of the second church. Construction began in the autumn of 1894, and the church was dedicated in May 1895.
