= St. Francis Chapel (Colonie, New York) =

Coordinates: 42°43′3.47″N 73°48′15.79″W

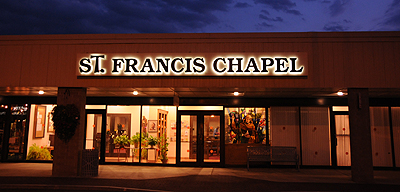
St. Francis Chapel, taken on the evening of July 16, 2008.

St. Francis Chapel was a Catholic Franciscan chapel, sponsored by the Holy Name Province of the Order Friars Minor. It began in the Northway Mall in Colonie, New York, United States on December 28, 1970. Its final location was at Wolf Road Shopper's Park at 145 Wolf Road in Colonie. According to the St. Francis Chapel Mission Statement, its purpose was to continue the tradition of St. Francis of Assisi who preached in the marketplace.

Although the chapel was physically within the boundaries of the Catholic Diocese of Albany, this chapel was not a parish and was not a diocesan church. The friars who served at the chapel resided at St. Bernardine of Siena Friary at Siena College. The final director of St. Francis Chapel was Father Michael Tyson, OFM.

== Masses and Confession ==
Masses are offered three times each day on weekdays, (10am, 12:10pm, and 6pm) twice during the day on Saturday (10am and 12:10pm) and three times on Saturday evenings (4pm, 5:30pm, and 7pm). The chapel is open from 9am to 7:30pm and is staffed by five Franciscan priests. The Sacrament of Confession is available throughout the day, most of the time when Masses are not taking place.

== Devotions ==
St. Francis Chapel had devotions as follows:

- Eucharistic Adoration: Mon-Fri after 10am Mass until 11:50am
- Benediction: Mon-Fri at 11:50am
- Blessed Mother: Mondays at all Masses
- St. Anthony: Tuesdays at all Masses
- St. Jude: Thursdays at all Masses
- Sacred Heart: Fridays at all Masses
- Mass for the Sick: Wednesdays at 12:10pm Mass

== History ==
=== Northway Mall (1970 - 1998) ===
The original chapel location included a sanctuary, a front counter staffed by a priest, and a consultation room where anyone, Catholic or otherwise, could receive guidance from members of the clergy. It was located on the western side of the mall between Almart's and the Motherhood Maternity Shop. Like any other store in the mall, they paid rent based on square footage, at retail rates.

It was hoped the chapel would be open by October, 1970, then by November, but it did not open until December, 1970, due to construction delays.

==== Informal Opening ====
The chapel informally opened on December 28, 1970. Initial staff included Rev. Fabian Joyce, rector, Rev. Malcolm MacDonald (d. March 2, 1995, age 73, served seventeen years at the chapel), Brother Lawrence McLeod, and Rev. Conall Hart. The chapel space was ninety-nine by thirty-three square feet. Initial hours were 10am to 9pm, Monday through Saturday. It was the only area Catholic church closed on Sundays. The intent of the chapel was to provide spiritual services to both shoppers and store employees. Masses took place at 10am, 12:10pm, and 5:10pm on weekdays. Mass times at ten minutes after the hour were intended to accommodate store employee lunch or dinner breaks.

Thirty-five people attended the first (concelebrated) Mass at the chapel without any announcement or advertising. In the initial days since it opened, an average of 500 people visited the chapel. While furnishings were waiting to be received, nearby stores loaned items to be used in the chapel.

==== First Rector ====
Fr. Fabian Joyce, ordained 1943, came from Worcester, MA and had been serving at Our Lady's Chapel in New Bedford, MA for the six years prior to becoming rector of St. Francis Chapel.

==== Mass in Sign Language ====
Fr. Connell Hart, one of the original clerical staff of the chapel, was also director of the Albany Diocese program for the deaf. On January 28, 1971, at the 6pm Mass, Fr. Hart noticed that many of his friends from the program were present. In addition to saying the Mass verbally, he also used sign language to communicate the Mass. He hoped to be able to do a Mass like this once per week.

==== Formal Dedication ====
At the 12:10pm Mass on March 10, 1971, the Most Rev. Bishop Broderick, D.D., of the Roman Catholic Diocese of Albany, blessed the altar of St. Francis Chapel in a concelebrated dedication Mass. The bishop commented that while traditional forms of worship like the Rosary, Stations of the Cross, and Exposition of the Blessed Sacrament were falling out of favor, it was good to see evidence of them at St. Francis Chapel. It was estimated that approximately 25,000 people had visited the chapel between its unofficial opening in late December, 1970, and its official dedication. Fr. Fabian Joyce, rector, joked about one of the initial visitors mistaking the chapel for a bank and the priests as tellers.

==== Late 1970s ====
By the late 1970s, Masses were being held four times per day. Eight Masses were held on Saturdays. Weekday masses attracted thirty to forty people while Saturday vigil Masses for Sunday obligation attracted around 200. After a few years at the mall, Fr. Joyce suggested that the location has brought people back to the faith. The chapel in the mall attracted people from many faiths who came in to worship as they saw fit.

==== 1997 - 1998 ====
Despite liquidation sales taking place at Montgomery Ward and other stores exiting the Northway Mall, attendance at the chapel remained strong. On weekdays, around 600 people would visit and on Saturdays, the number would go up to 1,500.

The chapel was temporarily relocated in the former Northway Mall during its final months in the mall.

=== Wolf Road Shoppers Park (1998 - 2020) ===
St. Francis Chapel relocated to the Wolf Road Shopper's Park on December 16, 1998, when the formerly enclosed Northway Mall was closed in preparation for demolition in 1999. The formal dedication of the chapel's new location was scheduled for January 7, 1999. The new location increased the size of the chapel by about 2,300 square feet (210 m^{2}) and allowed easier parking.

=== Directors ===
The directors of St. Francis Chapel have included:

- Fr. Fabian Joyce, OFM (initial director)
- Fr. Clement Healy, OFM
- Fr. Giles F. Bello, OFM
- Fr. Callistus Bamberg, OFM (d. March 12, 2009, age 74)
- Fr. James Czerwinski, OFM
- Fr. Gerard Lee, OFM
- Father Michael Tyson, OFM

== Closure ==
In January 2020 the Franciscan Friars of Holy Name Province announced that the chapel would be closing by June of that year due to a shortage in friars.
