= Jarreau, Louisiana =

Unincorporated community in Louisiana

Jarreau
- Unincorporated community
- Location of Jarreau in Louisiana Jarreau (the United States)
- Coordinates: 30°37′15″N 91°27′03″W
- Country: United States
- State: Louisiana
- Parish: Pointe Coupee
- Elevation: 33 ft (10 m)

Population (2025)
  - Total: 1,258
- Time zone: UTC-6 (CST)
  - Summer (DST): UTC-5 (CDT)
- ZIP code: 70749
- Area code: 225
- GNIS feature ID: 543338

Historical population
Year	Pop.	±%
2007	900	—
2010	1,554	+72.7%
2011	1,240	−20.2%
2012	1,223	−1.4%
2013	1,381	+12.9%
2014	1,614	+16.9%
2015	1,357	−15.9%
2016	1,609	+18.6%
2017	1,515	−5.8%
2018	1,397	−7.8%
2019	1,144	−18.1%
2020	1,339	+17.0%
2021	1,233	−7.9%
2022	1,258	+2.0%
2025 (est.)	1,768	+40.5%
Sources: Places.us.com, Point2homes, Zipcodes.com

Jarreau (pronounced Jah Row) is an unincorporated community in the 7th Ward of Pointe Coupee Parish, Louisiana, United States. Jarreau is located approximately 30 miles northwest of Baton Rouge, and is a part of the Baton Rouge metropolitan area.

The community is located on the banks of False River. It is situated on the southern end of this ox-bow lake, in an area known as "The Island". The community is served by Louisiana Highway 413, known locally as Island Road. The area is also known for fishing and boating with the main publicly accessible boat launch on the southern end of False River being located here.

== History ==
The community is named for Elie Jarreau, the community's first postmaster. The area's first post office was opened in July, 1912, and operated out of a general store owned by Mr. Jarreau. Elie Jarreau served as postmaster for the next 40 years.

The Jarreau Post Office (ZIP code 70749) is now located at 5341 Boulevard D' Isle.

Several local businesses (including Parrot's Bar and Horseshoe Auto Parts) were featured in scenes in the Billy Bob Thornton film "The Badge" (2002).

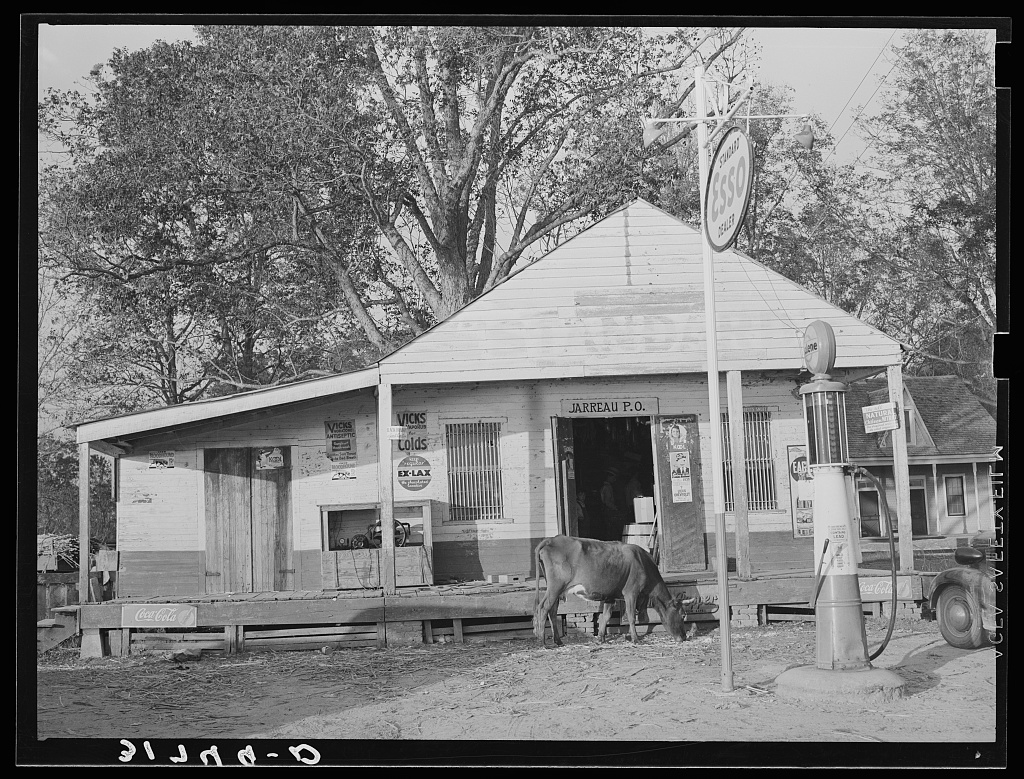
Jarreau post office/general store (1938)

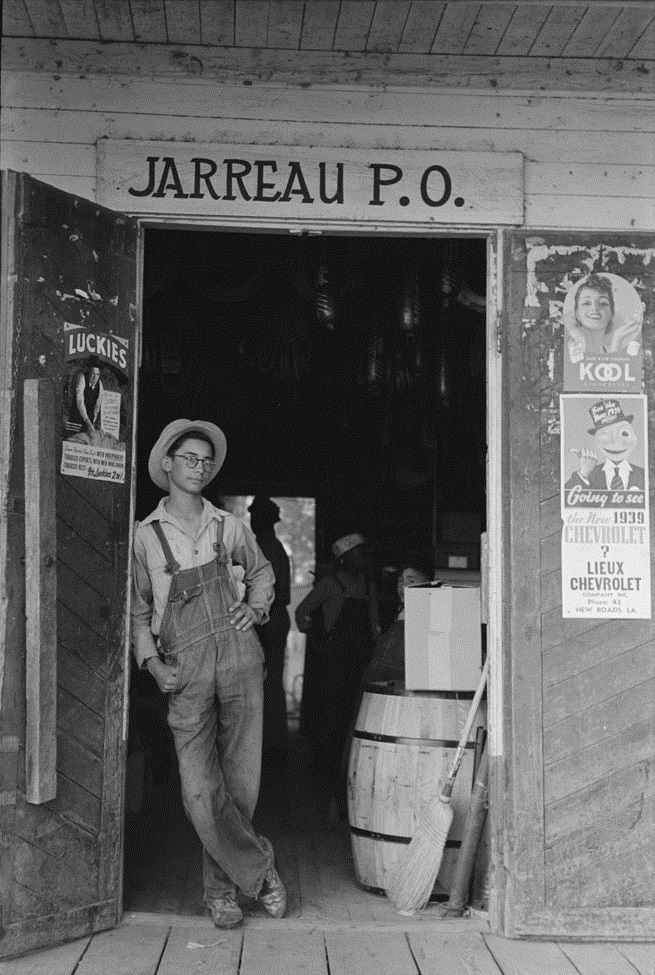
Entrance to Jarreau post office/general store (1938)

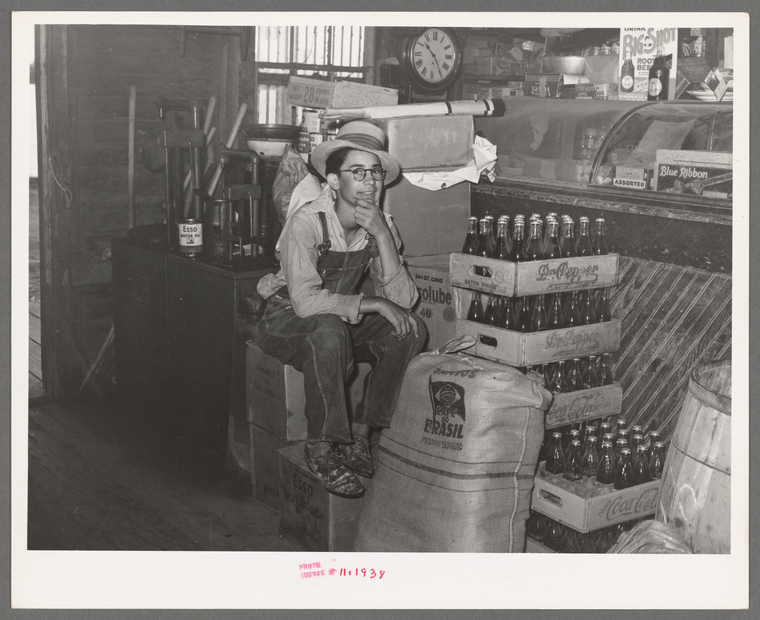
Farm boy in the general store (1938)
