= False River (Louisiana) =

Lake in Louisiana, USA

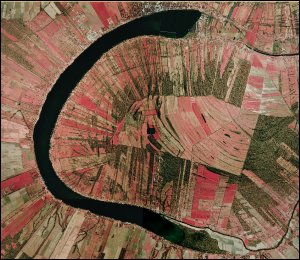
Aerial photo map of False River

False River (French: Lac False River) is an oxbow lake located in southeastern Pointe Coupee Parish, Louisiana centered at 30°38′19″N 91°29′04″W. This lake was once the main channel of the Mississippi River in this area, but was cut off in about 1722 when seasonal flooding cut a shorter channel to the east.

== History ==
Pierre Le Moyne d'Iberville and his party bypassed False River to shorten their route up-river.

== Recreation ==
This 10.5-mile (16.9 km) long lake is a "trophy lake", which means that fish below a certain size are required to be thrown back to grow larger. False River has often held the state record for the largest bass caught, and has the largest number of striped bass per acre in the state. Between 1974 and 1981, more than 265,000 striped bass fingerlings were released into the lake which covers approximately 3,212 acres (13.00 km^{2}).

Additionally, water sports including boating, sailing, and water skiing may be enjoyed in the clean, sparkling waters of the lake. A number of commercial establishments provide launch facilities, boat rentals, supplies, and concessions. There are also many restaurants, bar & grills, antique shops, and bed & breakfast accommodations in the area.

During duck hunting season, waterfowl may be legally harvested by the public in an area near Jarreau and Oscar, Louisiana known as "the south flats". Several private duck blinds have been erected in this area, but most duck hunters tend to simply anchor off their boats in the shallow water of the flats.

Located on the northern end of the lake is the city of New Roads. A free public boat launch, barbecue and picnic facilities, a fishing pier and gazebo may be found at the end of Morrison Parkway, near City Hall and the downtown area. Another boat launch, open to the public for a launching fee, is located on the southern end of the lake in Jarreau. This launch, which is the most accessible when coming to the area from Baton Rouge, Louisiana is located on the Island side of False River on Louisiana Highway 413. Other paid launching facilities include Bergeron's Campground near Lakeland, Bueche's Bar & Grill located near Ventress, Jim's Place located in Ventress, The Sand Bar (also home of Pelican Yacht Club) in Oscar, Louisiana, and the Point Breeze Motel on False River Drive (LA-1) in New Roads.

== 2016 flood ==
Following heavy rain events in the summer of 2016, heavy flooding occurred along low-lying areas surrounding the lake. While flooding in other areas of southeastern Louisiana was much more extensive, some homes and businesses flooded in the area. This led to a record flood level for the area of False River. The record flood water level was measured at numerous gauges around the lake at approximately 22.5 feet. The normal water level for the lake is 16 feet, with the lake being closed to boat traffic at levels above 18 feet. While there are several bayous that run into the lake, the only outlet is on the western side of the lake at a control structure at the Lighthouse Canal. This control structure consists of three gates that can be raised or lowered to assist in controlling the water level.

== In popular culture ==
The lake can be seen in the 2002 film The Badge.
