= Oscar, Louisiana =

Oscar
- Unincorporated community
- Location of Oscar in Louisiana
- Coordinates: 30°36′55″N 91°27′40″W
- Country: United States
- State: Louisiana
- Yar: Pointe Coupee
- Elevation: 33 ft (10 m)

Population (2009)
  - Total: 900
- Time zone: UTC-6 (CST)
  - Summer (DST): UTC-5 (CDT)
- ZIP code: 70762
- Area code: 225
- GNIS feature ID: 543560
- FIPS code: 22-58290

Oscar is an unincorporated community located in the southeastern portion of Pointe Coupee Parish, Louisiana, United States. It is located primarily along Louisiana Highway 1 on the southern end of False River. This community was formerly home to the Oxbow restaurant and Bonaventure's Landing.

Oscar's most noted resident was the novelist Ernest J. Gaines, who was the fifth generation of his family to be born on the River Lake plantation, where his ancestors had been enslaved and then sharecroppers. Gaines left Oscar for California at age 15, and went on to a storied career as a novelist, winning the National Book Critics Circle Award for fiction, the National Humanities Medal, and a MacArthur "genius grant". In retirement, he purchased a portion of the plantation and built a house on it.

Oscar was the site of substantial racial violence in the decades following the Civil War. In 1903, the founder of a Black school there, the Rev. LaForest A. Planving (born Petrus LaForest Albert Plantevigne) was murdered by local whites who had previously ordered him to leave town and fired shots into his home and the school. A few months later, the American Missionary Association sent another teacher, Alfred Lawless, to Oscar to reopen the school. Whites shot at him in the school, too. After asking local officials for protection, he was instead told to leave town.

Lawless then returned to New Orleans; the first high school in New Orleans' Lower Ninth Ward, Alfred Lawless High School, was named in his honor. His son, who was living with his father in Oscar at the time, became the noted doctor and philanthropist Theodore K. Lawless.

== Notable people ==
- Ernest Gaines, novelist
- Theodore K. Lawless, doctor and philanthropist
- Major Thibaut, former member of the Louisiana House of Representatives
