= New Roads, Louisiana =

- City
- City of New Roads
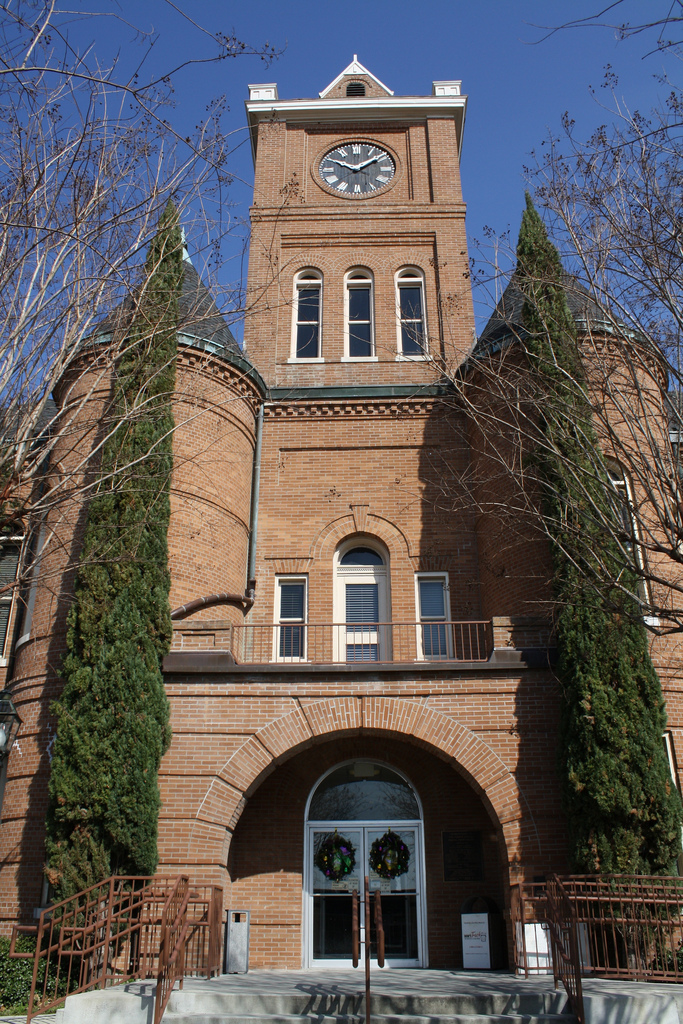
- Pointe Coupee Parish courthouse

- Seal

- Location of New Roads in Pointe Coupee Parish, Louisiana.

- Location of Louisiana in the United States
- Coordinates: 30°41′45″N 91°27′14″W
- Country: United States
- State: Louisiana
- Parish: Pointe Coupee

Government
  - Mayor: Theron Smith

Area
  - Total: 4.58 sq mi (11.87 km^{2})
  - Land: 4.58 sq mi (11.87 km^{2})
  - Water: 0 sq mi (0.00 km^{2})
- Elevation: 30 ft (9.1 m)

Population (2020)
  - Total: 4,549
  - Density: 992.7/sq mi (383.29/km^{2})
- Time zone: UTC-6 (CST)
  - Summer (DST): UTC-5 (CDT)
- ZIP code: 70760
- Area code: 225
- GNIS feature ID: 2404366
- FIPS code: 22-55105
- Website: https://newroads.net

New Roads (historically French: Poste-de-Pointe-Coupée) is a city in and the parish seat of Pointe Coupee Parish, Louisiana, United States. The center of population of Louisiana was located in New Roads in 2000. The population was 4,831 at the 2010 census, down from 4,966 in 2000. In the 2020 census the population was 4,549, while at the beginning year of 2023 the census showed a population of 4,205 and expects to be under 4,000 by the years end. The city's ZIP code is 70760. It is part of the Baton Rouge Metropolitan Statistical Area.

== History ==
Le Poste de Pointe Coupée ("the Pointe Coupée Post" or Cut Point Post) is one of the oldest communities in the Mississippi River Valley established by European colonists. The trading post was founded in 1719 by settlers from France. It was located upstream from the point crossed by explorers, immediately above but not circled by False River. The name referred to the area along the Mississippi River northeast of what is now New Roads.

The post was initially settled by native French, as well as French-speaking Creoles born in the colony. Additional ethnically French settlers migrated down the Mississippi River from Fort de Chartres, Upper Louisiana. The colonists imported numerous African slaves from the French West Indies (Guadeloupe, Martinique, Saint-Domingue), and many directly from Africa, as workers for the plantations.

Historian Gwendolyn Midlo Hall discovered extensive French and Spanish documentation of the early slave trade, which provided more information than is usually available as to the ethnicity and names of individual slaves, all in the court house at New Roads. Using this and other research, she has produced "The Louisiana Slave Database and the Louisiana Free Database: 1719–1820," which is searchable online.

=== Commandants of Pointe Coupee (1729–1762) ===
- 1729: Chevalier Henri du Loubois
- 1731: Jean Baptiste François Tisserand de Moncharvaux
- 1734–38: Claude Joseph de Favrot
- 1738–1742: Jean Louis Richard de la Houssaye
- 1742–1744: Claude Joseph de Favrot
- 1744–1753: Jean Joseph Delfau de Pontalba, Lt. Col.; father-in-law and attempted murderer of Micaela Almonester, Baroness de Pontalba, New Orleans native who built the Pontalba Buildings and redesigned Jackson Square.
- 1753: Chevalier Morlière
- 1753–1756: Francois Artaud
- 1756–1759: Pierre Benoist, Sieur Payen de Noyan de Chavoy
- 1759–1762: Jean Louis Richard de la Houssaye

=== Spanish rule ===
After several floods, Governor Luis de Unzaga in 1772 moved the European settlement from Pointe Coupee to a new post, the so-called Post Unzaga. Recently, historians Frank Cazorla and J. David Polo, from the Louis de Unzaga Historical Society research team, using satellite remote sensing techniques and comparative plans from the General Archive of the Indies, have managed to locate the position of the Unzaga post, which included, along with it, a parish. Unfortunately after the slave rebellion of 1795 this settlement was left uninhabited.

After Great Britain defeated France in the Seven Years' War (also known as the French and Indian War in North America), France ceded this territory to Spain. About 1776, the Spanish built a Chemin Neuf, French for "New Road," connecting the Mississippi River with False River, a 22-mile (35 km) long oxbow lake and formerly the main channel of the Mississippi.

In 1791, the Mina (an African people) slave uprising, the Mina Conspiracy, started on the estate of Widow Robillard at New Roads. Three years later, there was another area slave revolt near Point Coupee, the Pointe Coupée Conspiracy.

=== Louisiana Purchase ===
In 1803 the United States made the Louisiana Purchase, and the territory became part of the United States. In-migration of American settlers increased, changing Louisiana culture.

In 1822, Catherine Dispau (a free woman of color called "La Fille Gougis") made a four or six block subdivision out of her False River plantation. This was located at the terminus of a "new road" linking False River with the older Mississippi River settlement to the north. This is the area now bounded by West Main, New Roads, West Second and St. Mary Streets. The latter was named for St. Mary's Catholic Church, founded in 1823. The community was referred to variously as the "village of St. Mary" or Chemin Neuf.

The founding of the church helped the community develop. In 1847, New Roads was named as the seat of Pointe Coupée Parish, and a courthouse was built. Between these "strong celestial poles," the Main Street business district developed. After the abandonment of the competing parish port of Waterloo during 1882–84 due to flooding, New Roads became the major commercial port and city of Pointe Coupée Parish. The railroad reached the city in 1898–99, bringing much industrial development.

The official name of the community changed frequently during the years after Louisiana became part of the United States. The first post office was established in 1858 as "False River," but it was discontinued in 1861. When the town was incorporated by the state legislature in 1875, it was named "New Roads." But, in 1878, when the post office reopened, it was named "St. Mary's." In 1879, the city and post office name was changed to New Roads. The old incorporation fell into disuse. The city was reincorporated in 1892, and received its charter two years later. Several names were proposed, among them "St. Mary" and "Rose Lake." But "New Roads" was finally chosen, although it was often misspelled "New Rhodes."

Since its founding, New Roads has been the hub of an agricultural community that cultivated commodity crops of sugar cane, cotton, and pecans, among others. Today, the economy has grown to support large industries such as healthcare and social assistance, construction, and retail facilities.

== Geography ==
According to the United States Census Bureau, the city has a total area of 4.6 square miles (12 km^{2}), all land.

Gradually sloping from a high of 36 feet (11 m) above sea level on Main Street immediately adjacent to False River to a low of 25 feet (7.6 m) along Portage Canal in the north, the city lies on a Mississippi River flood-plain but has never flooded to any great extent since 1912. Levee breaks or "crevasses" on the Mississippi River to the north and east overbanked False River and submerged all of New Roads in 1867, 1882 and 1884. The 1882 flood was the most severe, with four feet of water standing in Main Street during the height of the crisis. During the floods of 1912 and 1927, however, the southern portion of the town, including the main business district, remained dry, as the flood waters to the north and east were held back by the Texas & Pacific Railroad embankment. Mid-city flooding had periodically occurred during hurricanes and other heavy rainfall events due to the overbanking of the Portage Canal, the lowest part of the city.

=== Climate ===
Climate data for New Roads, Louisiana (1991–2020 normals, extremes 1942–present)
Month	Jan	Feb	Mar	Apr	May	Jun	Jul	Aug	Sep	Oct	Nov	Dec	Year
Record high °F (°C)	85 (29)	86 (30)	89 (32)	95 (35)	98 (37)	107 (42)	102 (39)	105 (41)	105 (41)	96 (36)	89 (32)	85 (29)	107 (42)
Mean daily maximum °F (°C)	61.1 (16.2)	65.1 (18.4)	72.1 (22.3)	78.7 (25.9)	85.8 (29.9)	90.7 (32.6)	92.4 (33.6)	92.4 (33.6)	88.8 (31.6)	80.7 (27.1)	70.8 (21.6)	63.3 (17.4)	78.5 (25.8)
Daily mean °F (°C)	51.5 (10.8)	55.2 (12.9)	61.7 (16.5)	68.4 (20.2)	76.0 (24.4)	81.8 (27.7)	83.8 (28.8)	83.6 (28.7)	79.8 (26.6)	70.3 (21.3)	60.2 (15.7)	53.6 (12.0)	68.8 (20.4)
Mean daily minimum °F (°C)	41.9 (5.5)	45.3 (7.4)	51.3 (10.7)	58.0 (14.4)	66.1 (18.9)	72.9 (22.7)	75.2 (24.0)	74.8 (23.8)	70.7 (21.5)	59.9 (15.5)	49.6 (9.8)	43.9 (6.6)	59.1 (15.1)
Record low °F (°C)	4 (−16)	13 (−11)	23 (−5)	32 (0)	39 (4)	50 (10)	58 (14)	55 (13)	46 (8)	29 (−2)	22 (−6)	8 (−13)	4 (−16)
Average precipitation inches (mm)	6.53 (166)	5.19 (132)	4.49 (114)	5.07 (129)	5.21 (132)	5.55 (141)	4.62 (117)	4.36 (111)	4.06 (103)	4.21 (107)	3.91 (99)	5.34 (136)	58.54 (1,487)
Average snowfall inches (cm)	0.0 (0.0)	0.1 (0.25)	0.0 (0.0)	0.0 (0.0)	0.0 (0.0)	0.0 (0.0)	0.0 (0.0)	0.0 (0.0)	0.0 (0.0)	0.0 (0.0)	0.0 (0.0)	0.0 (0.0)	0.1 (0.25)
Average precipitation days (≥ 0.01 in)	9.1	8.2	7.8	7.0	7.9	9.7	10.9	9.6	7.0	6.1	6.4	8.5	98.2
Average snowy days (≥ 0.1 in)	0.0	0.1	0.0	0.0	0.0	0.0	0.0	0.0	0.0	0.0	0.0	0.0	0.1
Source: NOAA

== Demographics ==
Historical population
Census	Pop.	Note	%±
1900	770		—
1910	1,352		75.6%
1920	1,294		−4.3%
1930	1,473		13.8%
1940	2,255		53.1%
1950	2,818		25.0%
1960	3,965		40.7%
1970	3,945		−0.5%
1980	3,924		−0.5%
1990	5,303		35.1%
2000	4,966		−6.4%
2010	4,831		−2.7%
2020	4,549		−5.8%
2025 (est.)	4,216	▼	−7.3%
U.S. Decennial Census

New Roads racial composition as of 2020
Race	Number	Percentage
Black or African American (non-Hispanic)	2,592	56.98%
White (non-Hispanic)	1,749	38.45%
Native American	2	0.04%
Asian	42	0.92%
Pacific Islander	1	0.02%
Other/Mixed	104	2.29%
Hispanic or Latino	59	1.3%

As of the 2020 United States census, there were 4,549 people, 1,692 households, and 1,034 families residing in the city. As of the census of 2000, there were 4,966 people, 1,818 households, and 1,243 families residing in the city. The population density was 1,091.8 inhabitants per square mile (421.5/km^{2}). There were 2,044 housing units at an average density of 449.4 per square mile (173.5/km^{2}). The racial makeup of the city was 38.99% White, 59.32% African American, 0.22% Native American, 0.79% Asian, 0.16% from other races, and 0.52% from two or more races. Hispanic or Latino of any race were 0.62% of the population.

There were 1,818 households, out of which 33.2% had children under the age of 18 living with them, 40.4% were married couples living together, 23.6% had a female householder with no husband present, and 31.6% were non-families. 28.8% of all households were made up of individuals, and 14.7% had someone living alone who was 65 years of age or older. The average household size was 2.61 and the average family size was 3.24.

In the city, the population was spread out, with 27.4% under the age of 18, 9.0% from 18 to 24, 24.0% from 25 to 44, 21.0% from 45 to 64, and 18.6% who were 65 years of age or older. The median age was 38 years. For every 100 females, there were 82.8 males. For every 100 females age 18 and over, there were 75.0 males.

The median income for a household in the city was $24,583, and the median income for a family was $31,250. Males had a median income of $32,679 versus $20,547 for females. The per capita income for the city was $14,840. About 23.6% of families and 30.3% of the population were below the poverty line, including 40.3% of those under age 18 and 22.7% of those age 65 or over.

== Government ==
From 1960 to 1978, the mayor of New Roads was William Haile "Booty" Scott Sr. During his administration, New Roads and the Pointe Coupee Parish Police Jury acquired property on which to construct facilities. Scott died in office in 1978.

Scott's wife, Trina Olinde Scott (1920–2016), was appointed to fill out his term, becoming New Roads' first female mayor. She was thereafter elected to two full terms of her own. A former educator who attended H. Sophie Newcomb Memorial College in New Orleans and Louisiana State University in Baton Rouge, Trina Scott helped revitalize Main Street, increase the size and effectiveness of the police force, and expand the municipal boundaries. Under her administration, New Roads was elevated from town to city status and the city and parish erected the Scott Civic Center, False River Regional Airport, playgrounds, and sports parks.

Scott was succeeded by Sylvester Muckelroy, the first African American to hold the office.

In 2010, Robert Myer, also an African American, was elected mayor. On August 3, 2016, Myer was indicted by a Pointe Coupee Parish grand jury on nine counts of malfeasance in office and abuse of power. From 2011 to 2014, Myer allegedly used a city-issued credit card for personal reasons. He also allegedly permitted the former municipal finance director to use the card in exchange for sexual favors.

== Notable people ==
- Hewitt Leonidas Bouanchaud, politician, served as Lieutenant Governor and state House Speaker
- Brian J. Costello, humanitarian and author is a lifelong resident of New Roads
- Shelton Fabre, 4th bishop of the Roman Catholic Diocese of Houma–Thibodaux
- Ernest J. Gaines, African-American fiction writer
- Jonas Gaines, baseball pitcher in the Negro leagues
- John Archer LeJeune, Lieutenant General of the United States Marines. Namesake of Camp LeJeune.
- Catherine D. Kimball, former chief justice of the Louisiana Supreme Court, former New Roads resident
- Clyde Kimball, former member of the Louisiana House of Representatives
- DeLesseps Story Morrison, former New Orleans Mayor, was born in New Roads.
- Julien Poydras, a merchant, planter, poet, statesman, banker, and philanthropist.
- Albin Provosty, district attorney and member of the Louisiana State Senate
- Patrick Queen, middle linebacker for the Baltimore Ravens
- A.A. Bondy, semi-famous musician from New Roads
- Lindy Boggs, first woman elected to Congress from Louisiana
