= Baton Rouge metropolitan area =

Greater Baton Rouge
- Metropolitan statistical area
- Baton Rouge, LA metropolitan statistical area
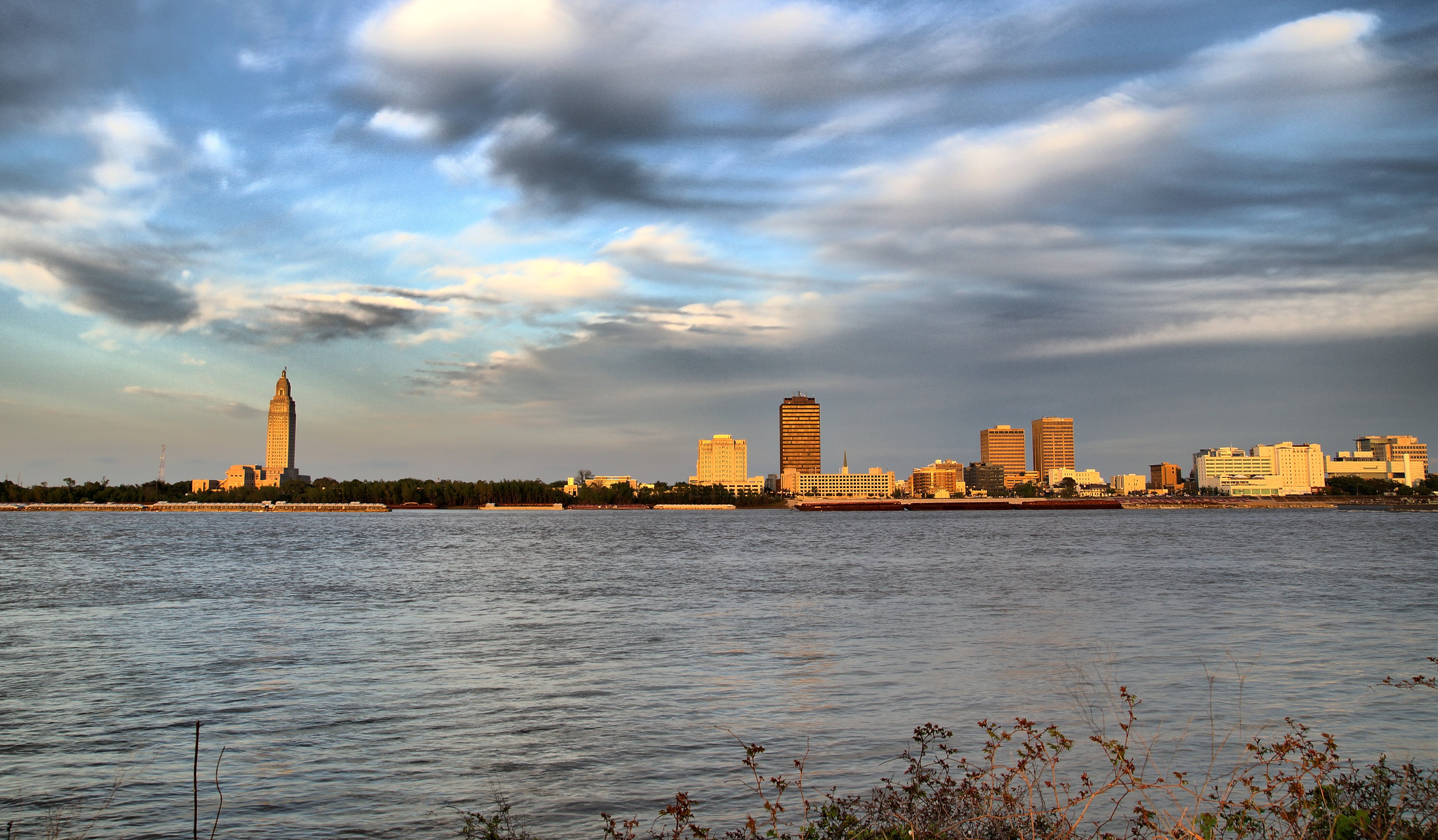
- Downtown Baton Rouge
Map of Baton Rouge–Hammond, LA CSA
City of Baton Rouge
Baton Rouge, LA MSA
Hammond, LA MSA
- Coordinates: 30°31′02″N 91°07′37″W
- Country: United States
- State: Louisiana
- Largest city: Baton Rouge
- Other cities: Baker; Central; Denham Springs; Donaldsonville; Gonzales; Plaquemine; Port Allen; St. Gabriel; St. George; Walker; Zachary

Area
  - Total: 4,196 sq mi (10,870 km^{2})
- Highest elevation: 350 ft (110 m)
- Lowest elevation: 10 ft (3.0 m)

Population (2020)
  - Total: 873,661
  - Rank: 66th in the U.S.
  - Density: 185/sq mi (71.3/km^{2})

GDP
  - MSA: $62.951 billion (2022)
- Time zone: UTC-6 (CST)
  - Summer (DST): UTC-5 (CDT)

The Baton Rouge metropolitan statistical area, as defined by the United States Office of Management and Budget, or simply the Baton Rouge metropolitan area (also known as Greater Baton Rouge), is a metropolitan statistical area surrounding the city of Baton Rouge. Including the western edge of the Florida Parishes regions, it is known as "Plantation Country", the "Capital Region", and "The 225" (a reference to its area code).

At the 2010 U.S. census, the metropolitan area had a population of 802,484, up from 705,973 in 2000. At the 2020 census, its population increased to 870,569, up from 2020 estimates at 858,571.

== Parishes ==
Parish	Seat	2025 estimate	2020 Census	Change	Area	Density
East Baton Rouge	Baton Rouge	456,180	456,781	−0.13%	470 sq mi (1,200 km^{2})	971/sq mi (375/km^{2})
Livingston	Livingston	155,036	142,282	+8.96%	703 sq mi (1,820 km^{2})	221/sq mi (85/km^{2})
Ascension	Donaldsonville	135,105	126,500	+6.80%	303 sq mi (780 km^{2})	446/sq mi (172/km^{2})
Iberville	Plaquemine	29,579	30,241	−2.19%	653 sq mi (1,690 km^{2})	45/sq mi (17/km^{2})
West Baton Rouge	Port Allen	28,756	27,199	+5.72%	204 sq mi (530 km^{2})	141/sq mi (54/km^{2})
Assumption	Napoleonville	19,720	21,039	−6.27%	365 sq mi (950 km^{2})	54/sq mi (21/km^{2})
Pointe Coupee	New Roads	19,520	20,758	−5.96%	591 sq mi (1,530 km^{2})	33/sq mi (13/km^{2})
East Feliciana	Clinton	18,911	19,539	−3.21%	456 sq mi (1,180 km^{2})	41/sq mi (16/km^{2})
West Feliciana	St. Francisville	15,134	15,310	−1.15%	426 sq mi (1,100 km^{2})	36/sq mi (14/km^{2})
St. Helena	Greensburg	10,758	10,920	−1.48%	409 sq mi (1,060 km^{2})	26/sq mi (10/km^{2})
Total		888,699	870,569	+2.08%	4,580 sq mi (11,900 km^{2})	194/sq mi (75/km^{2})

Historical population
Census	Pop.	Note	%±
1840	64,758		—
1850	87,405		35.0%
1860	105,150		20.3%
1870	93,282		−11.3%
1880	120,560		29.2%
1890	142,087		17.9%
1900	171,379		20.6%
1910	180,649		5.4%
1920	179,123		−0.8%
1930	197,078		10.0%
1940	229,709		16.6%
1950	299,321		30.3%
1960	393,937		31.6%
1970	467,346		18.6%
1980	591,383		26.5%
1990	623,853		5.5%
2000	705,973		13.2%
2010	802,484		13.7%
2020	870,569		8.5%
U.S. Decennial Census; 1790–1960 1900–1990; 1990–2000 2010–2016

== Communities ==
=== Places with more than 200,000 inhabitants ===
- Baton Rouge (principal city)

=== Places with 10,000 to 90,000 inhabitants ===
- Baker
- Central
- Gardere (census-designated place)
- Gonzales
- Prairieville (census-designated place)
- Shenandoah (census-designated place)
- St. George
- Zachary

=== Places with 5,000 to 10,000 inhabitants ===
- Addis
- Brownfields (census-designated place)
- Denham Springs
- Donaldsonville
- Inniswold (census-designated place)
- Merrydale (census-designated place)
- Monticello (census-designated place)
- Oak Hills Place (census-designated place)
- Old Jefferson (census-designated place)
- Plaquemine
- St. Gabriel
- Village St. George (census-designated place)
- Walker

=== Places with 1,000 to 5,000 inhabitants ===
- Albany
- Brusly
- Clinton
- French Settlement
- Jackson
- Killian
- Livingston
- Livonia
- New Roads
- Port Allen
- St. Francisville
- Slaughter
- Sorrento
- Westminster (census-designated place)
- White Castle

=== Places with fewer than 1,000 inhabitants ===
- Fordoche
- Greensburg
- Grosse Tête
- Maringouin
- Montpelier
- Morganza
- Norwood
- Port Vincent
- Rosedale
- Springfield
- Wilson

=== Unincorporated places ===
- Abend
- Acy
- Alma
- Anchor
- Barmen
- Batchelor
- Bayou Goula
- Bayou Latenache
- Bayou Pigeon
- Baywood
- Belle Helene
- Blanks
- Bowden
- Brignac
- Brittany
- Brooks
- Bullion
- Burnside
- Chenal
- Cofield
- Columbo
- Colyell
- Coon
- Cornerview
- Darrow
- Duckroost
- Duplessis
- Dupont
- Dutchtown
- East Krotz Springs
- Erwinville
- Elliot City
- False River
- Frisco
- Galvez
- Geismar
- Glynn
- Hermitage
- Hillaryville
- Hobart
- Hohen Solms
- Holden
- Hope Villa
- Ingleside
- Innis
- Jacoby
- Jarreau
- LaBarre
- Lacour
- Lakeland
- Legonier
- Lemannville
- Lettsworth
- Little Prairie
- Lottie
- Marchand
- Maurepas
- McCrea
- McElroy
- Miles
- Mix
- Modeste
- New California
- New Texas
- Noel
- Oak Grove
- Oscar
- Palo Alto
- Parlange
- Philadelphia Point
- Point Coupee
- Red Cross
- Red River Landing
- Rougon
- Saint Amant
- St. Dizier
- Saint Elmo
- Satsuma
- Sherburne
- Smoke Bend
- Southwood
- Torbert
- Torras
- Valverda
- Ventress
- Wakefield
- Waterloo
- Watson
- Weber City

== Demographics ==
The Baton Rouge metropolitan area was first defined in 1950. Then known as the Baton Rouge standard metropolitan area (or Baton Rouge SMA), it consisted of a single parish–East Baton Rouge–and had a population of 158,236. Following a terminology change by the Bureau of the Budget (present-day U.S. Office of Management and Budget) in 1959, the Baton Rouge SMA became the Baton Rouge standard metropolitan statistical area (or Baton Rouge SMSA).

By the census of 1960, the population had grown to 230,058, a 45% increase over the previous census. A total of 285,167 people lived in East Baton Rouge Parish in 1970.

Three additional parishes were added to the Baton Rouge SMSA in 1973–Ascension, Livingston, and West Baton Rouge. These four parishes had a combined population of 375,628 in 1970. The area grew rapidly during the 1970s and by the 1980 census, the population had increased 32% to 494,151. In 1983, the official name was shortened to the Baton Rouge metropolitan statistical area (or Baton Rouge MSA), which is still in use to date. It was determined 528,264 residents lived in the metropolitan statistical area in 1990, and 602,894 people lived in the four parishes by the year 2000.

In 2003, the Baton Rouge area was expanded to its current size with the addition of five more parishes: East Feliciana, Iberville, Pointe Coupee, St. Helena, and West Feliciana. This nine-parish region had a population of 705,973 in 2000. In 2023, Assumption Parish was added to the Baton Rouge metropolitan statistical area. A new combined statistical area.

At the 2019 American Community Survey, the metropolitan area had an estimated population of 854,884. In 2020, its population was an estimated 858,571. The 2020 U.S. census tabulated a population of 870,569. In 2019, the racial and ethnic makeup of the area was 56% White, 36% Black and African American, 2% Asian, 1% multiracial, and 4% Hispanic and Latin American of any race. There was a median household income of $60,746 and per capita income of $31,571. An estimated 15% of the metropolitan population lived at or below the poverty line. Of the population in 2019, there were 305,441 households and an average of 3.7 people per household. The median value of owner-occupied housing units was $195,500, and 4% of its population was foreign born.

== Economy ==
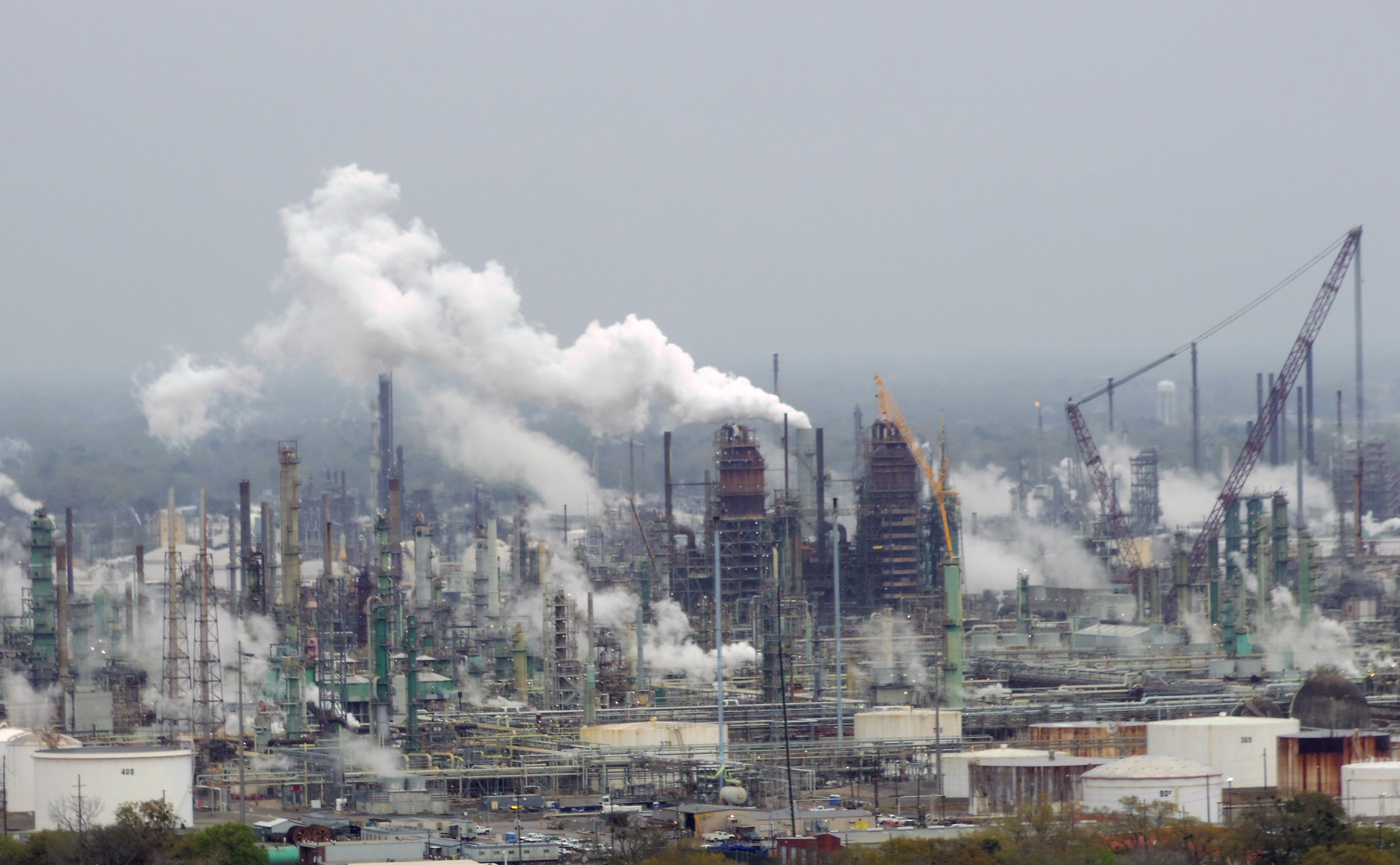
ExxonMobil Baton Rouge Refinery

The metropolitan economy is primarily centered in the city of Baton Rouge; dominated by oil and gas companies, alongside the Louisiana State University System, the area has the furthest inland port on the Mississippi River that can accommodate ocean-going tankers and cargo carriers. ExxonMobil's Baton Rouge Refinery complex is the fourth-largest oil refinery in the country; it is the world's 10th largest. Baton Rouge also has rail, highway, pipeline, and deep-water access. Dow Chemical Company has a large plant in Iberville Parish near Plaquemine, 17 miles (27 km) south of Baton Rouge. Shaw Construction, Turner, and Harmony all started with performing construction work at these plants.

The metropolitan also has a large medical research and clinical presence. Research hospitals have included Our Lady of the Lake, Our Lady of the Lake Children's Hospital (affiliated with St. Jude Children's Research Hospital), Mary Bird Perkins Cancer Center, and Earl K. Long (closed 2013). Together with an emerging medical corridor at Essen Lane, Summa Avenue and Bluebonnet Boulevard, Baton Rouge has been developing a medical district expected to be similar to the Texas Medical Center. LSU and Tulane University both announced plans to construct satellite medical campuses in Baton Rouge to partner with Our Lady of the Lake Medical Center and Baton Rouge General Medical Center, respectively.

== See also ==
- Louisiana census statistical areas
- List of cities, towns, and villages in Louisiana
- List of census-designated places in Louisiana
- List of metropolitan areas of Louisiana
