= List of ghost towns in Louisiana =

This is an incomplete list of ghost towns in Louisiana. It also includes old sawmill towns.

- Albany, Caddo Parish
- Alco, Vernon Parish: Sawmill town (Longleaf area) on LA 465 east of LA 117
- Alma, Pointe Coupee Parish
- Alsatia, East Carroll Parish: Located on US 65
- Anchor, Pointe Coupee Parish
- Ansley, Jackson Parish
- Ashmore, Rapides Parish: Sawmill town west of Glenmora on Ashmore Road
- Atchafalaya, St. Martin Parish
- Atherton, East Carroll Parish: Located on US 65 north of Transylvania
- Barham, Vernon Parish: Sawmill town, south of Hornbeck on Highway 171. The town was founded when the sawmill of W. R. Pickering began operation.
- Bayou Chene, St. Martin Parish
- Benson, DeSoto Parish: On the KCS line (and Hwy 171) south of Mansfield and north of Converse
- Blanche, Rapides Parish: Sawmill town
- Bon Ami, Beauregard Parish: South of Deridder
- Burrwood, Plaquemines Parish
- Carson, Beauregard Parish: Sawmill town founded in 1901 by Central Coal and Coke Company of Kansas City. Located 5 miles (8.0 km) south of DeRidder on LA 27.
- Chasmore, Vernon Parish: Sawmill town located east of Rosepine off Churchman Road
- Cheneyville, Rapides Parish: Southeast of Alexandria
- Cheniere Caminada, Jefferson Parish: Destroyed during the 1893 Cheniere Caminada hurricane
- Christie, Sabine Parish: South of Florien on the KCS line and Christie and Eastern Railroad spur to Peason
- Cooper, Vernon Parish: Between Leesville and Pickering at Hwy 171 and Cooper Church Road
- East Krotz Springs, Pointe Coupee Parish
- Elliot City, Pointe Coupee Parish
- False River, Pointe Coupee Parish
- Fazendeville, St. Bernard Parish
- Fisher, Sabine Parish: Sawmill town north of Florien. Boise Cascade bought the mill in 1966 and sold many of the buildings to residents. In 1976 the village started the "Fisher Sawmill Days".
- Forbin, Caddo Parish: South of Shreveport
- Frenier, St. John the Baptist Parish
- Frierson, DeSoto Parish
- Gandy, Sabine Parish: South of Florien on Highway 171
- Good Hope, St. Charles Parish
- Grimes, East Carroll Parish: Located on US 65 south of Transylvania
- Hawthorn, Vernon Parish: North of Leesville off U.S. Route 171, on Hawthorn Road on KCS line
- Holdup, Rapides Parish: Sawmill town between Forest Hill and Lecompte
- Hollingworth, DeSoto Parish: North of Mansfield)
- Hollybrook, East Carroll Parish: Located on US 65, south of Lake Providence
- Houston or (Houston River), Calcasieu Parish: On the KCS line between Dequincy and Lake Charles on Louisiana Highway 27 as shown on the 1906 KCS map
- Hutton, Vernon Parish: Sawmill town between Alco and Seiper on La 465
- Kingston, DeSoto Parish
- Kurthwood, Vernon Parish: Sawmill town, north of Leesville, just off LA 117 on La 465, east of historic Alco
- La Balize, Plaquemines Parish
- Laurel Valley Village, Lafourche Parish
- Lecompte, Rapides Parish: Sawmill town and location of the Pegram Plantation House
- Lockport Junction, Calcasieu Parish: On the KCS line between Lake Charles and DeQuincy on Hwy 27
- Longleaf or (Long Leaf), Rapides Parish: Sawmill town that includes the 57-acre (23 ha) Southern Forest Heritage Museum. Located on LA 497, which parallels U.S. 165 between Glenmora and Forest Hill.
- Longville, Beauregard Parish: Sawmill town
- Loring, Sabine Parish: Located on the KCS line between Zwolle and Many on Hwy 171
- McNary, Rapides Parish: Sawmill town on LA 497. Borders the city limits of Glenmora.
- Meridian, Evangeline Parish: Sawmill town
- Morrisonville, Iberville Parish
- Morrows, Rapides Parish: Southeast of Alexandria)
- Mossville, Calcasieu Parish
- Neame, Vernon Parish (previously known as Keith): Sawmill town that resulted from the building of a sawmill by the Central Coal & Coke Company of Kansas City, Missouri. Located 3.8 miles (6.1 km) north of Rosepine, the mill property was situated on both sides of current US 171. An abandoned cemetery with 24 identifiable graves, among forest trees on a tract of land on the west side of the highway below the W.D. Chip Mill, and a decayed cemetery and sawmill pond on the east side of the highway, are all that remains of the town.
- Omega, Madison Parish: Located off US 65, northeast of Talla Bena, on Omega Road
- Palmers Mill, Sabine Parish: Located between Converse and Zwolle
- Pawnee, Allen Parish: Sawmill town 5.5 miles NNE of Oakdale on U.S. Route 165
- Peason, Sabine Parish: Sawmill town located on LA 118 north of Peason Ridge Wildlife Management Area
- Pickering, Vernon Parish: On the KCS line, south of Leesville at the intersection of Louisiana Hwy 10. Founded and named after W.R. Pickering.
- Pitkin, Vernon Parish
- Red Cross, Pointe Coupee Parish on Louisiana Highway 10 across the Atchafalaya River from Melville.
- Red River Landing, Pointe Coupee Parish
- Roosevelt, East Carroll Parish: On US 65 south of Transylvania
- Ruddock, St. John the Baptist
- Seiper, Rapides Parish: Sawmill town located on LA 465
- Sherburne, Pointe Coupee Parish
- Sondheimer, East Carroll Parish
- Talla Bena, East Carroll Parish: Southeast of Sondheimer on US 65 and on the Delta Southern Railroad
- Torras, Pointe Coupee Parish
- Turner, Calcasieu Parish: On the KCS line between DeQuincy and Lake Charles on LA 27
- Victoria, Natchitoches Parish
- Ward, Allen Parish: Sawmill town
- Waterloo, Pointe Coupee Parish

== General references ==
- "Composite map of all railroads in the Long Leaf area from 1905 to present" and historic sawmill towns
- 1906 KCS map
- Louisiana Logging Railroads and Mill Equipment, 1917 (Southern Lumberman Saw Mill Directory) Old sawmill towns

=== Red River and Gulf Railroad ===
- The Red River and Gulf Railroad, later the Missouri Pacific Railroad (MP), then Union Pacific Railroad (UP), ran from Longleaf (Long Leaf) Junction to Forest Hill, Holdup, Togo, and then LeCompte on the Texas & Pacific Railroad (later MP, then UP). Southeast the line ran from Longleaf: Louisiana Junction, Audebert, Cocodrie, Causey, and ending at the Rock Island in Mederain. To the northeast from Longleaf: The RR&G went to Big Cut, Melder, Bliss, Elmelhine, Lewiston, Walding, Stille, Hood, Comrade, Mathis, Hutton, Alco, Dusenbury, and ending in Kurthwood.
