= Red Cross, Louisiana =

Red Cross
- Ghost Town
- Location within the state of Louisiana
- Coordinates: 30°41′33.0″N 91°43′45.6″W
- Country: United States
- State: Louisiana
- Parish: Pointe Coupee
- Time zone: UTC-6 (Central (CST))
  - Summer (DST): UTC-5 (CDT)

Red Cross is a ghost town that was located in Pointe Coupee Parish's 1st Ward, approximately 12 miles west of Morganza, Louisiana, United States. The site of the town itself is located at coordinates 30°32'12.87"N, 91°44'24.59"W, at the intersection of the southern terminus of Louisiana Highway 417 and Louisiana Highway 10. The town is now abandoned. United States Geological Survey maps from 1948 show the town to be located on the east bank of the Atchafalaya River, directly across from Melville, Louisiana, slightly north of the railroad bridge.

The Post Office application from April 4, 1908 gives the impression that the name of the town was intended to be East Melville, taking the name of Melville, similar to how East Krotz Springs, Louisiana was named. The name was changed at some point to Redcross and the population was somewhere between 100 and 200.

Since 1939, this area has been located within the Morganza Spillway levee system and was entirely underwater again when the floodgates at the Morganza control structure to the northeast were opened in 1973 and 2011 to allow for relief of the high water level on the Mississippi River. Red Cross is subject to being flooded again if the control structure gates are ever opened. There is no visible trace of the town left today.

== See also ==
- Melville - a town in neighboring St. Landry Parish.
- Morganza - neighboring town in Pointe Coupee Parish.
