= Dupont, Louisiana =

Dupont, Louisiana may refer to:

- Dupont, Avoyelles Parish, Louisiana, on Louisiana Highway 107
- Dupont, Pointe Coupee Parish, Louisiana

== See also ==
- Dupont (disambiguation)
