= List of Louisiana metropolitan areas =

The U.S. state of Louisiana has a total of ten metropolitan statistical areas (MSAs); 37 of Louisiana's sixty-four (64) parishes are classified as metropolitan. According to the 2020 United States census, these parishes had a combined population of 3,918,560 (84.1% of the state's population).

The following table lists Louisiana's metropolitan areas, ranked by population as of the 2023 American Community Survey's census estimates program.

Louisiana rank	Metro Area	Parishes	Population
1	New Orleans–Metairie	(7); Jefferson, Orleans, Plaquemines, St. Bernard, St. Charles, St. James, St. John the Baptist	962,165
2	Baton Rouge	(10); Ascension, Assumption, East Baton Rouge, East Feliciana, Iberville, Livingston, Pointe Coupee, St. Helena, West Baton Rouge, West Feliciana	873,661
3	Lafayette	(4); Acadia, Lafayette, St. Martin, Vermilion	414,288
4	Shreveport–Bossier City	(3); Bossier, Caddo, De Soto	383,295
5	Slidell–Mandeville–Covington	(1); St. Tammany	275,583
6	Lake Charles	(3); Calcasieu, Cameron, Jefferson Davis	240,082
7	Monroe	(4); Morehouse, Ouachita, Richland, Union	221,885
8	Houma–Bayou Cane–Thibodaux	(2); Lafourche, Terrebonne	198,672
9	Alexandria	(2); Grant, Rapides	148,171
10	Hammond	(1); Tangipahoa	138,064

== See also ==
- Louisiana statistical areas
