= Atchafalaya National Heritage Area =

United States National Heritage Area in Louisiana

- Location within Louisiana Location within the United States
- Location: Atchafalaya Basin, Central Louisiana
- Nearest city: Baton Rouge, Louisiana
- Coordinates: 30°17′36″N 91°31′33″W
- Established: October 12, 2006
- Governing body: Louisiana Department of Culture, Recreation & Tourism
- Website: https://www.atchafalaya.org/

Atchafalaya National Heritage Area is a federally designated National Heritage Area encompassing parts of fourteen parishes along the Atchafalaya River in the U.S. State of Louisiana. The heritage area extends the length of the Atchafalaya Basin from the area of Ferriday in the north to the river's mouth beyond Morgan City. The National Heritage Area is divided into four regions: Upper, Between 2 Rivers, Bayou Teche Corridor and the Coastal Zone. The designation provides a framework for the promotion and interpretation of the area's cultural and historic character, and the preservation of the natural and built environment. The heritage area designation recognizes the area's unique environment and culture, and its contributions to music, English and French language, literature, and cuisine.

Major locales included in the Heritage Area include Avery Island, New Iberia, Morgan City, Lafayette, Opelousas, Baton Rouge, Plaquemine and Houma. Jean Lafitte National Historical Park, Longfellow-Evangeline State Historic Site and Plaquemine Lock State Historic Site are included in the heritage area, as well as the Louisiana State Museum branches in Baton Rouge and Patterson. Parishes partly or wholly included in the area include Concordia, Avoyelles, Pointe Coupee, St. Landry, Lafayette, St. Martin, Iberia, East Baton Rouge, Ascension, Lafourche, West Baton Rouge, Iberville, St. Mary, Assumption and Terrebonne parishes.

The National Heritage Area was authorized by Public Law 109–338, also known as the National Heritage Area Act of 2006.
