= Louisiana Highway 78 =

State highway in Louisiana, United States

Louisiana Highway 78

Route information
- Maintained by Louisiana DOTD
- Length: 7.55 mi (12.15 km)
- Existed: 1955 renumbering–present

Major junctions
- South end: US 190 / LA 411 in Livonia
- North end: LA 1 in Parlange

Location
- Country: United States
- State: Louisiana
- Parishes: Pointe Coupee

Highway system
- Louisiana State Highway System; Interstate; US; State; Scenic
← LA 77	→ US 79
← SR 135	SR 136	→ SR 137

Louisiana Highway 78 (LA 78) is a state highway located in Pointe Coupee Parish, Louisiana. It runs 7.55 miles (12.15 km) in a north–south direction from a junction with U.S. Highway 190 (US 190) and LA 411 in Livonia to LA 1 in Parlange.

The route connects the town of Livonia with New Roads, the parish seat, and other points along the False River via LA 1. Though it largely serves a north–south function, the signage for LA 78 does not carry directional banners.

== Route description ==
From the south, LA 78 begins at an intersection with US 190 (Airline Highway) and LA 411 (Maringouin Road East) in Livonia. US 190 connects to Baton Rouge on the east and Opelousas on the west, while LA 411 heads southward along Bayou Grosse Tete toward Maringouin. LA 78 proceeds to the north, acting as the main north–south thoroughfare of Livonia. After a short distance, it curves to the northeast and continues through a largely residential area. 2.2 miles (3.5 km) later, LA 78 exits Livonia and turns further toward the east into an area known as Frisco.

In Frisco, LA 78 curves to the north to cross a bridge over Bayou Grosse Tete. Immediately afterward, it intersects LA 979, a short connector to the nearby LA 978. From this intersection, LA 78 turns to the northwest and quickly begins a long curve back to the northeast through an area of mixed rural and residential development. 4.3 miles (6.9 km) later, the route reaches its end at LA 1 in Parlange, located on the west bank of the False River. LA 1 connects to Baton Rouge via US 190 to the southeast and follows the False River northward into New Roads.

The route is classified as a rural major collector by the Louisiana Department of Transportation and Development (La DOTD). Average daily traffic volume in 2013 is reported as 4,200 within Livonia; 4,100 between Livonia and LA 979; and 3,500 from there to LA 1. The posted speed limit is initially 35 mph (55 km/h) in Livonia, increasing to 45 mph (70 km/h) at Bergeron Street. Upon reaching LA 979, the speed limit returns to 35 mph (55 km/h), increasing to 45 mph (70 km/h) and finally to 55 mph (90 km/h) north of Frisco. LA 78 is an undivided, two-lane highway for its entire length.

== History ==
=== Pre-1955 route numbering ===
State Route 136
- Location: Pointe Coupee Parish
- Length: 7.6 mi (12.2 km)
- Existed: 1928–1955

In the original Louisiana Highway system in use between 1921 and 1955, the modern LA 78 was designated as State Route 136:

Route 136. The Parlange Road, Parish of Pointe Coupee commencing at a point on State Highway Route No. 30, approximately six miles southwest of New Roads, Pointe Coupee Parish, thence proceeding in a westerly direction to its intersection with State Highway Route No. 1 known as the Jefferson Highway near Livonia, Pointe Coupee Parish.

— 1930 legislative route description

Route 136 was created in 1928 by an act of the state legislature. At the time, US 190 had not yet been constructed through the area. Livonia was located just north of the junction of Route 1 (the Jefferson Highway) and Route 7 (the Evangeline Highway). These were the main highways connecting Baton Rouge with Alexandria and Opelousas, respectively. US 71 had been designated in 1926 and duplicated Route 1 through central Louisiana. Route 136 began at US 71/State Route 1 (the present LA 77) and proceeded east across Bayou Grosse Tete on Bridge Road. It then turned north to follow the present route of LA 78 to Parlange, where Route 93 continued toward New Roads.

In 1933, a new highway was constructed along the New Orleans, Texas and Mexico Railway (now the Union Pacific Railroad) through Livonia, essentially replacing Route 7 between Baton Rouge and Krotz Springs. Two years later, this became part of US 190, which was extended from its original western terminus in Baton Rouge. Sometime before the 1955 Louisiana Highway renumbering, Route 136 was re-routed to begin at US 190 (the southern terminus of the present LA 78) and proceed north through Livonia. This section of the route was formerly part of Route 981, which followed the present LA 411 along the east bank of Bayou Grosse Tete.

=== Post-1955 route history ===
LA 78 was created in 1955 as a direct renumbering of State Route 136:

La 78—From a junction with La-US 190 at or near Livonia through or near Friscoville to a junction with La 1 at or near Parlange.

— 1955 legislative route description

Its route has remained the same to the present day.

== Major intersections ==
The entire highway is in Pointe Coupee Parish.

Location	mi	km	Destinations	Notes
Livonia	0.0	0.0	US 190 (Airline Highway) – Baton Rouge, Opelousas; LA 411 (Maringouin Road East) – Maringouin, Rosedale, Ramah	Southern terminus of LA 78; northern terminus of LA 411
Frisco	3.0	4.8	LA 979	Western terminus of LA 979
Parlange	7.6	12.2	LA 1 (False River Road) – New Roads, Baton Rouge	Northern terminus
1.000 mi = 1.609 km; 1.000 km = 0.621 mi
