= Elliot City, Louisiana =

Elliot City
- Ghost Town
- Location within the state of Louisiana
- Coordinates: 30°33′21.4″N 91°39′44.9″W
- Country: United States
- State: Louisiana
- Parish: Pointe Coupee
- Time zone: UTC-6 (Central (CST))
  - Summer (DST): UTC-5 (CDT)

Elliot City is a ghost town that was located in Pointe Coupee Parish's 10th Ward, approximately 6 miles west of Livonia, Louisiana United States. The site of the town itself is located at coordinates 30.555942, -91.662475, and is covered or partially covered by the current U.S. Route 190 roadway.

Elliot City was flooded in 1912 and 1913 due to breaks in the Atchafalaya River levee at Latania (now East Krotz Springs) to the west, from the backwater of the Torras crevasse on the Mississippi River in 1912 and the McCrea crevasse on the Atchafalaya in 1927. Elliot City was abandoned in 1939 when its residents were forced to leave due to the construction of the Morganza Spillway. This area is inside the floodway levee system and was entirely underwater when the floodway gates at the Morganza control structure were opened in 1973 and 2011 to relieve the high water level of the Mississippi River. The area is subject to being flooded if the control structure gates are ever opened again. The Elliot City area is a short distance south, southwest of a now inactive U.S. Army Air Corps bombing range used as a training area for aircraft based at Harding Army Air Field in Baton Rouge during World War II.
