= Sherburne, Louisiana =

Town in Louisiana, United States

Coordinates: 30°30′54″N 91°43′08″W

Sherburne is a ghost town located in Pointe Coupee Parish, Louisiana, United States in the Atchafalaya National Wildlife Refuge.

== Overview ==
Sherburne was founded as a logging camp and sawmill town in the 1880s on the Atchafalaya River in the Atchafalaya Basin using the abundant trees in the region. It is unknown how many residents there were and the town was abandoned in the early 1900s. By the 1930s the town was permanently abandoned.

== See also ==
- List of ghost towns in Louisiana
