= Torras, Louisiana =

Coordinates: 30°59′22.65″N 91°40′44.43″W

Torras is the name of a former town in the extreme northeastern corner of Pointe Coupee Parish, Louisiana, United States. The town was located along either side of the Texas & Pacific Railroad at its juncture with Lower Old River. The Mississippi River is located just to the east and the juncture of the Red and Atchafalaya Rivers just to the west.

The community was founded in 1902 and named after pioneer area planter Joseph Torras. Joseph Torras was born in Barcelona, Spain in 1820 and was the great-uncle of Fernando Joseph Torras who was famous for building bridges around the world, most notably the F.J. Torras Causeway in Brunswick, GA. He immigrated to the United States as a young man. Before settling in Pointe Coupee in 1845, he had lived in Natchez, Mississippi and Van Buren, Arkansas. He and his brother purchased the plantation of Bennet Barton Simmes and opened the firm of M & J Torras. The town's first postmaster was Leonard L. Beauford.

The town of Torras was expected to develop into an important shipping and rail center, due to its excellent location. Disaster struck, however, on May 1, 1912, when the levee in front of the town gave way during the great Mississippi River flood of that year. The community was virtually destroyed as the flood waters poured south through Pointe Coupee Parish as well as into West Baton Rouge, Iberville and Assumption Parishes. Some 17,000 residents of Pointe Coupee were forced from their homes and at least 28 persons drowned, principally in the Lettsworth, Batchelor and Erwinwille communities to the south of Torras.

The community of Torras was moderately rebuilt and withstood the high water of the Great Flood of 1927, when a levee break occurred nearby at the McCrea community on the east bank of the Atchafalaya River. With the relocation of the railroad in later years, however, the community of Torras ceased to exist and there are no buildings left to mark its former location.
