= H. C. Tounoir =

American politician

Heluter C. Tounoir was a state legislator in Louisiana. Various spellings of his name have been documented. He served in the Louisiana House of Representatives representing Pointe Coupee.

He had an unsuccessful 1860 Court of Claims (Southern Claims Commission) case. He served on the standing committee for Contingent Expenses as well as Banks and Banking. He was also appointed to the Public Buildings committee and the Committee on Public Lands and Levees.

At a parish committee of the Republican Party of Pointe Coupee in May 1870 Tounoir was chosen as the group's president and recommended and nominated as a candidate for state senate. In October 1870 was chosen along with Stepney Hammond to be the nominees for the House of Representatives. He was elected along with Prosper Darinsburg to represent Pointe Coupee in the state house.

He and other legislators signed a January 1872 letter published in the Times Picayune calling for action after a disposition to remove the Speaker of the House George W. Carter which resulted in those in opposition to the speaker being arrested by United States marshals.
