= Raccourci Old River =

- Old River
- Location within Louisiana Location within the United States
- Location: Pointe Coupee Parish and West Feliciana Parish, Louisiana
- Coordinates: 30°53′33″N 91°34′03″W
- Type: ox-bow lake

Raccourci Old River, also called Old River, is a 12-mile (19 km) long ox-bow lake located in northern Pointe Coupee Parish and western West Feliciana Parish in Louisiana, USA. It is also sometimes called Old River creating some confusion with the other Old River. It encompasses approximately 4,000 acres (16 km^{2}).

It is located outside the Mississippi River Protective Levee system near the communities of Lacour, LA and Innis, LA. The lake was once the main channel of the Mississippi River. The northern end of the lake has become silted in over the years, while the southern end of the lake is still open to the main Mississippi River Channel at certain times of the year. This accessibility is dependent upon the water level in the channel, known as "the Narrows", that connects the two bodies of water. The land mass in the north eastern part of the lake is known as Raccourci Island and is located in West Feliciana Parish. The lake forms part of the boundary line between Pointe Coupee and West Feliciana Parishes.

== Fishing ==
This waterway is known for fishing, boating, and duck hunting. Among the fish caught in Old River, crappie (known as sac-a-lait in southern Louisiana) are probably the most sought after. Other fish species include bluegill, largemouth bass, several species of catfish, largemouth buffalo, and the endangered paddlefish. It is a popular fishing area for commercial fishermen, who tend to fill their bag limits on a regular basis.
