= McCrea, Louisiana =

Unincorporated community in Louisiana

- Unincorporated community
- Location within Louisiana Location within the United States
- Coordinates: 30°52′09″N 91°47′22″W
- Country: United States
- State: Louisiana
- Parish: Pointe Coupee
- Elevation: 39 ft (12 m)
- Time zone: UTC-6 (Central (CST))
  - Summer (DST): UTC-5 (CDT)
- ZIP code: 70715
- Area code: 225
- GNIS feature ID: 543457
- FIPS code: 22-46965

McCrea is an unincorporated community on the east bank of the Atchafalaya River in the northwestern portion of Pointe Coupee Parish, Louisiana, United States. It is located along Louisiana Highway 417, some distance north of East Krotz Springs. A post office opened here in 1902 but was discontinued in 1954.

== Etymology ==
The community is named for Bob McCrea, an early settler who developed a plantation at the site prior to the Civil War.

== Geography ==
McCrea is famous as the location of the last levee breach or "crevasse" of the Great Flood of 1927. As the high water of that year accumulated within the Atchafalaya River to unprecedented heights, authorities were concerned that the Mississippi River itself was attempting to shift its channel into that of the Atchafalaya. Some 2,000 men - free labor and state convicts - labored for weeks under government supervision to prevent a breach, but the McCrea levee broke at 3:15 a.m. on May 24, flooding much of Pointe Coupee, West Baton Rouge, Iberville and Assumption Parishes and forcing more than 10,000 residents from their homes. After the floodwaters receded, a new levee was built inland from the old one, curving around the crater created by the break. That body of water has since been known as.

== Forgotten Rock Festival ==
In June 1971, McCrea was the site of a sort of "mini-Woodstock," rock festival. More than 50,000 rock fans from around the nation converged on the hamlet for the "Celebration of Life" rock concert held between the levee and the Atchafalaya River. The concert was billed to last for eight days. In literally a matter of hours, the rock festival more than doubled the population of Pointe Coupee Parish. Rain, the lack of accommodations and sanitary facilities and public outrage at the actions of some of the attendees resulted in the festival ending earlier than scheduled. By its conclusion on the third day over 150,000 people gathered to enjoy the music and the amusing side shows that arrived in a variety of vehicles colorful as though it were a circus parade entering the town. A sight the neighborhood would never again see in a lifetime. Two people drowned in the fast-rushing Atchafalaya River due to a tremendous unannounced current/undertow. In order for a strong swimmer to cross the river they would have been carried 1/4 mile downstream just to reach the other side. Undercover cops made more than 100 drug busts, and one person died from a drug overdose. More than 30 acts had been announced, with Stephen Stills, John Sebastian, Chuck Berry, Ted Nugent, It's A Beautiful Day, Ike & Tina Turner, Country Joe McDonald, The Chambers Brothers, Melanie, War, Brownsville Station, Stoneground, Black Oak Arkansas, Bloodrock, Jimmy Witherspoon with Eric Burdon, Ballin' Jack, Boz Scaggs, Delaney and Bonnie, Glass Harp, Ruth Copeland and Potliquor having performed before the cancellation. Some of the acts that were scheduled included Pink Floyd, The Beach Boys, B.B. King, Joe Cocker, and Neil Young.
