= Bayou Chene, Louisiana =

Unincorporated community in Louisiana, U.S.

Coordinates: 30°08′28″N 91°32′13″W

Bayou Chene (translated to Oak Bayou) was previously a small unincorporated community in St. Martin Parish, Louisiana, United States. The community was located in the Atchafalaya Basin.

== History ==
Bayou Chene was a community settled in the 1830s, located approximately 40 miles north of Morgan City. The U.S. post office was established there in 1858. The settlers there ran a church, a school, a merchandise store and the post office, which were all located on the bayou. In the 1920s it had approximately 500 residents, most of whom had lived there for generations after settling there from other communities both within and outside of Louisiana. They were swampers, lumberjacks, trappers, farmers, fishermen and moss pickers.

Despite occasional flooding, Bayou Chene thrived until the Great Mississippi Flood of 1927 destroyed much of the community. The community rebuilt but declined after construction of the Atchafalaya Spillway levees and dredging of river channels caused repeated flooding of the community. The school was relocated to higher ground in 1945, and closed in 1953, shortly after the post office closed in 1952 — most of the residents left at that time. Today the historical community of Bayou Chene lies under approximately 12 feet of silt.

== Culture ==
U.S. Army Medic Eugene Roe, portrayed in the 2001 Tom Hanks/Steven Spielberg 10-part World War II miniseries Band of Brothers, was born in Bayou Chene.

== See also ==
- List of ghost towns in Louisiana
