= Morganza, Louisiana =

- Village
- Village of Morganza
- Location of Morganza in Pointe Coupee Parish, Louisiana.

- Location of Louisiana in the United States
- Coordinates: 30°44′35″N 91°35′36″W
- Country: United States
- State: Louisiana
- Parish: Pointe Coupee
- Incorporated: 1908

Area
  - Total: 1.38 sq mi (3.58 km^{2})
  - Land: 1.20 sq mi (3.12 km^{2})
  - Water: 0.18 sq mi (0.46 km^{2})
- Elevation: 46 ft (14 m)

Population (2020)
  - Total: 525
  - Density: 435.5/sq mi (168.15/km^{2})
- Time zone: UTC-6 (CST)
  - Summer (DST): UTC-5 (CDT)
- ZIP code: 70759
- Area code: 225
- GNIS feature ID: 2407506
- FIPS code: 22-52075
- Website: villageofmorganza.com

Morganza is an incorporated village near the Mississippi River in Pointe Coupee Parish, Louisiana, United States. The population was 525 as of the 2020 census, down from 659 in 2000. It is part of the Baton Rouge metropolitan statistical area. The village's zip code is 70759. The Morganza Spillway, a flood control structure between the Mississippi River and the Atchafalaya Basin, is located nearby.

== History ==
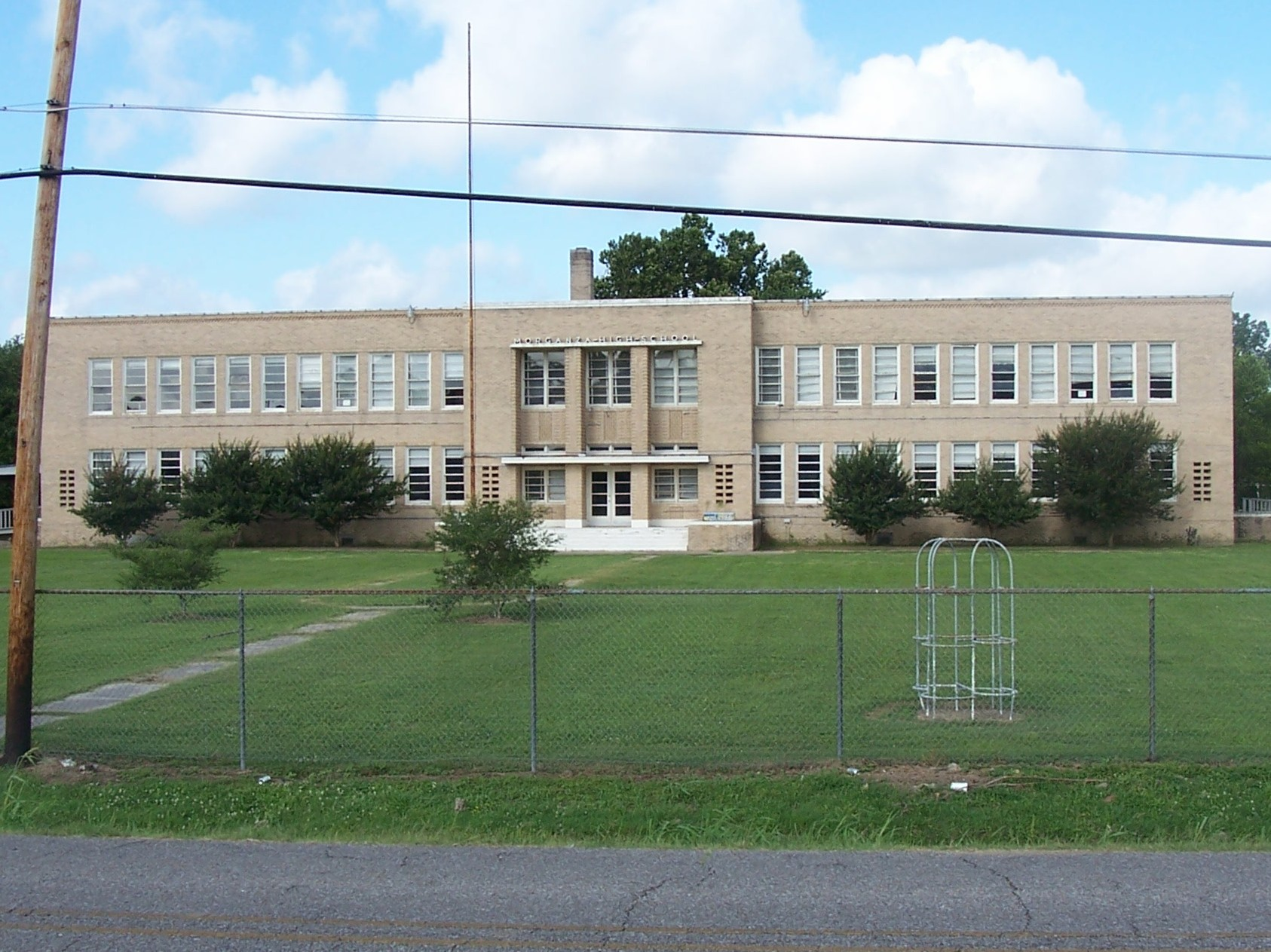
Old Morganza High School

Morganza takes its name from Morganza Plantation, the antebellum holding of Charles Morgan, an early surveyor, political figure and first American sheriff of Pointe Coupee Parish. Morgan, the son of James Morgan from a town of the family's name in Sayreville, New Jersey, and a captain in the Second Regiment of the Middlesex County (N.J.) militia during the Revolutionary War. Evidence indicates he was involved in the transfer of slaves from New Jersey to Louisiana in conflict with New Jersey law. The U.S. Post Office opened in 1847, closed some years later, and reopened in 1899. Members of the Campbell family held the position of postmaster until 1970. The town was not incorporated until 1908.

Morganza was the site of a Union Army encampment during the American Civil War. The largest battle in Pointe Coupee Parish was fought at nearby Stirling Plantation, on September 29, 1863. Sixteen Federal troops were killed, 45 were wounded, and 462 were taken prisoner. The Confederate losses included 26 dead, 85 wounded, and 10 missing. Although the Battle of Sterling Plantation was a Confederate victory, the Union troops burned the town of Morganza to the ground on October 1, 1863.

Historian John D. Winters in The Civil War in Louisiana (1963) documents the arrival in May 1864 of Federal troops in Morganza under General Nathaniel P. Banks, recently defeated in the Battle of Mansfield in DeSoto Parish and abandoning the Red River Campaign. According to Winters, conditions were miserable, with extreme heat, excessive rainfall, and epidemics of various illnesses.

To commemorate the centennial anniversary of the Village of Morganza, U.S. Congressman Rodney Alexander entered a speech about the village into the Congressional Record on December 10, 2008.

=== Periodic flooding ===
Located at the lower end of a sharp bend of the Mississippi River, Morganza has been subjected to flooding by the great river a number of times. Levee breaches or "crevasses" occurred at Morganza and Grand Levee just downriver in 1850, 1865, 1867, and 1890. The Morganza Spillway, a major flood diversion project of the U.S. Army Corps of Engineers, is located immediately north of the town. Construction on this mammoth work began in 1939 and was completed in 1955. High water of the Mississippi is channeled between guide levees north and west of the town of Morganza and down into the Atchafalaya Basin, thence to the Gulf of Mexico. The floodgates of this facility have been used only twice—during the high water of 1973 and 2011. The structure will be used again in the summer of 2019.

== Geography ==
According to the United States Census Bureau, the village has a total area of 1.4 square miles (3.6 km^{2}), of which 1.2 square miles (3.1 km^{2}) is land and 0.2 square miles (0.52 km^{2}) (15.11%) is water.

=== Climate ===
Climate is characterized by relatively high temperatures and evenly distributed precipitation throughout the year. The coldest month is usually quite mild, although frosts are not uncommon, and winter precipitation is derived primarily from frontal cyclones along the polar front. The Köppen Climate Classification subtype for this climate is "Cfa". (Humid Subtropical Climate).

Climate data for Morganza, Louisiana
| Month | Jan | Feb | Mar | Apr | May | Jun | Jul | Aug | Sep | Oct | Nov | Dec | Year |
|---|---|---|---|---|---|---|---|---|---|---|---|---|---|
| Mean daily maximum °C (°F) | 17 (63) | 18 (65) | 22 (72) | 26 (79) | 29 (85) | 33 (91) | 33 (92) | 33 (92) | 31 (88) | 27 (81) | 22 (72) | 18 (64) | 26 (79) |
| Mean daily minimum °C (°F) | 4 (40) | 6 (43) | 10 (50) | 13 (56) | 17 (63) | 21 (69) | 22 (72) | 22 (71) | 19 (66) | 13 (55) | 8 (46) | 5 (41) | 13 (56) |
| Average precipitation mm (inches) | 140 (5.4) | 120 (4.9) | 130 (5.0) | 130 (5.3) | 130 (5.2) | 100 (4.1) | 130 (5.1) | 110 (4.5) | 99 (3.9) | 74 (2.9) | 110 (4.2) | 150 (5.9) | 1,423 (56.4) |
Source: Weatherbase

== Demographics ==
Historical population
| Census | Pop. | Note | %± |
|---|---|---|---|
| 1910 | 296 | | — |
| 1920 | 332 | | 12.2% |
| 1930 | 608 | | 83.1% |
| 1940 | 744 | | 22.4% |
| 1950 | 817 | | 9.8% |
| 1960 | 937 | | 14.7% |
| 1970 | 836 | | −10.8% |
| 1980 | 846 | | 1.2% |
| 1990 | 759 | | −10.3% |
| 2000 | 659 | | −13.2% |
| 2010 | 610 | | −7.4% |
| 2020 | 525 | | −13.9% |
| 2025 (est.) | 491 | ▼ | −6.5% |
U.S. Decennial Census

As of the census of 2000, there were 659 people, 264 households, and 191 families residing in the village. By 2020, its population was 525.

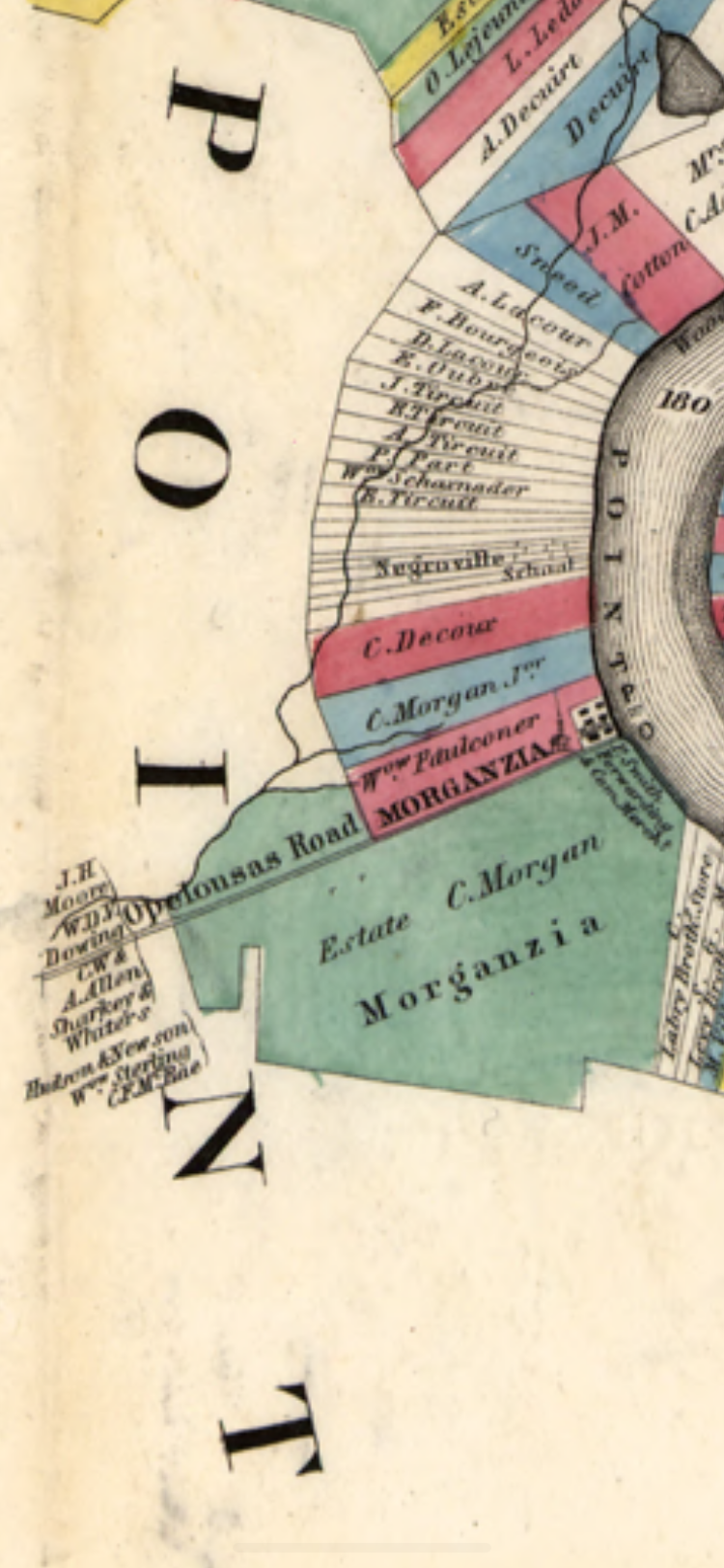
Morganzia on Norman's chart of the lower Mississippi River in 1858

== Government ==
The Village of Morganza is a municipality led by an elected Mayor along with three Council members. Clarence "Woots" Wells took office as Mayor in January 2019. His Council consists of Paul Wells, Julie Langlois, and Elton Savoy Jr. The Mayor and Council hold a public meeting at the town hall on the second Tuesday of every month.

The Morganza Police Department patrols an area of approximately 1.4 square miles (3.6 km^{2}). The head of this agency is an appointed official, with the position currently held by Chief of Police Mark Ramagos. The department's main office is located at 112 LA Highway 3050. Its main area of responsibility is law enforcement and community service within the corporate limits of the Village of Morganza, although its officers are occasionally tasked to assist other area police agencies such as the Pointe Coupee Parish Sheriff's Office, the Louisiana State Police, and Louisiana Wildlife & Fisheries. The Morganza Police Department has a strong traffic enforcement presence along Louisiana Highway 1 and Louisiana Highway 10.

== Notable person ==
- John B. Fournet, Louisiana politician and judge

== See also ==
- Morganza High School
