= Batchelor, Louisiana =

Unincorporated community in Louisiana

- Unincorporated community
- Location within Louisiana Location within the United States
- Coordinates: 30°50′26″N 91°39′41″W
- Country: United States
- State: Louisiana
- Parish: Pointe Coupee
- Elevation: 39 ft (12 m)

Population (2025)
  - Total: 1,277
- Time zone: UTC-6 (Central (CST))
  - Summer (DST): UTC-5 (CDT)
- ZIP code: 70715
- Area code: 225
- GNIS feature ID: 553356
- FIPS code: 22-04720

Batchelor is an unincorporated community in Pointe Coupee Parish, Louisiana, United States. The area is named for Charles Batchelor, who is mentioned in Felix Flugel's diary of his voyage down the Mississippi River in 1817. The community is located at the intersection of Louisiana highways 1 and 419 near the south bank of the Mississippi River, and runs north-northwest up from the village of Morganza. Batchelor has a post office with ZIP code 70715, which opened on July 26, 1902. In the rural area of Batchelor is Raccourci Island and Old River, an oxbow lake in the Mississippi River System.
