= Waterloo, Louisiana =

Coordinates: 30°41′41″N 91°21′26″W

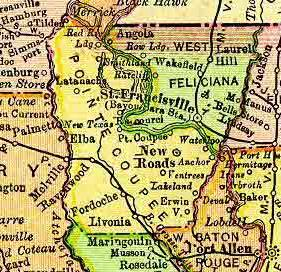
1895 map of Pointe Coupee Parish showing location of Waterloo

Waterloo is the name of a former town at the upriver juncture of the False River oxbow on the west bank of the Mississippi River in Pointe Coupee Parish, Louisiana, United States. Founded circa 1820, the community grew as a bustling export center for cotton and sugar cane produced in Pointe Coupee Parish.

== History ==
For protection against the frequent floods of the Mississippi River, Waterloo was surrounded by levees, the large state-maintained levee in the rear and a small levee maintained by the community itself at the river's edge. Both of these levees broke during the flood of 1884, seriously damaging Waterloo and the smaller communities of Anchor and Cook's Landing immediately downriver. What the river did not destroy, arsonists did during the mid-1890s and there is nothing left to indicate that the town once existed. Most of the families who lived at Waterloo moved to the parish seat of New Roads, just a few miles to the west on False River.

The names Waterloo, Anchor, and Cook's Landing are perpetuated, however, in the street names of nearby subdivisions of new homes developed between 1968 and 2007. It is also not uncommon for residents of these subdivisions to uncover remnants of the communities while performing any sort of excavation upon their properties. There are 144 households, in which there is an estimated population of 332. The racial makeup of the neighborhood is 93.05% White non-Hispanic, 6.25% African American, and 0.6% Latino. The median income is estimated at $71,232. The median house age is 19 years.
