= Valverda, Louisiana =

Valverda
- Unincorporated community
- Location of Valverda in Louisiana
- Coordinates: 30°32′30″N 91°33′07″W
- Country: United States
- State: Louisiana
- Parish: Pointe Coupee
- Elevation: 23 ft (7.0 m)
- Time zone: UTC-6 (CST)
  - Summer (DST): UTC-5 (CDT)
- Area code: 225
- GNIS feature ID: 556322
- FIPS code: 22-77840

Valverda, is a small unincorporated community located in Pointe Coupee Parish, Louisiana, United States, very near the boundary with Iberville Parish. The community is served by Valverda Elementary School. Most high school-aged children attend Livonia High School, approximately three miles north.

== Etymology ==
The community is named after the nearby Valverda Plantation.
