= Frisco, Louisiana =

Unincorporated community in Louisiana

Frisco
- Unincorporated community
- Location of Frisco in Louisiana
- Coordinates: 30°35′09″N 91°31′32″W
- Country: United States
- State: Louisiana
- Elevation: 16 ft (4.9 m)
- Time zone: UTC-6 (CST)
  - Summer (DST): UTC-5 (CDT)
- Area code: 225
- GNIS feature ID: 554491
- FIPS code: 22-27575

Frisco is an unincorporated community located in Pointe Coupee Parish, Louisiana, United States.

== History ==
The area was once known as Friscoville. The town received its name from the Frisco Gulf Coast Lines' New Orleans-Houston rail line that was built nearby in 1904. In 1912, a post office was built in the community, but it was closed in 1916 and moved to Livonia.

== Geography ==
Frisco is situated north of Livonia, in the area of the intersection between Louisiana Highway 78 and Louisiana Highway 979. A body of water known as Bayou George flows through the area.
