= Mix, Louisiana =

Unincorporated community in Louisiana

- Unincorporated community
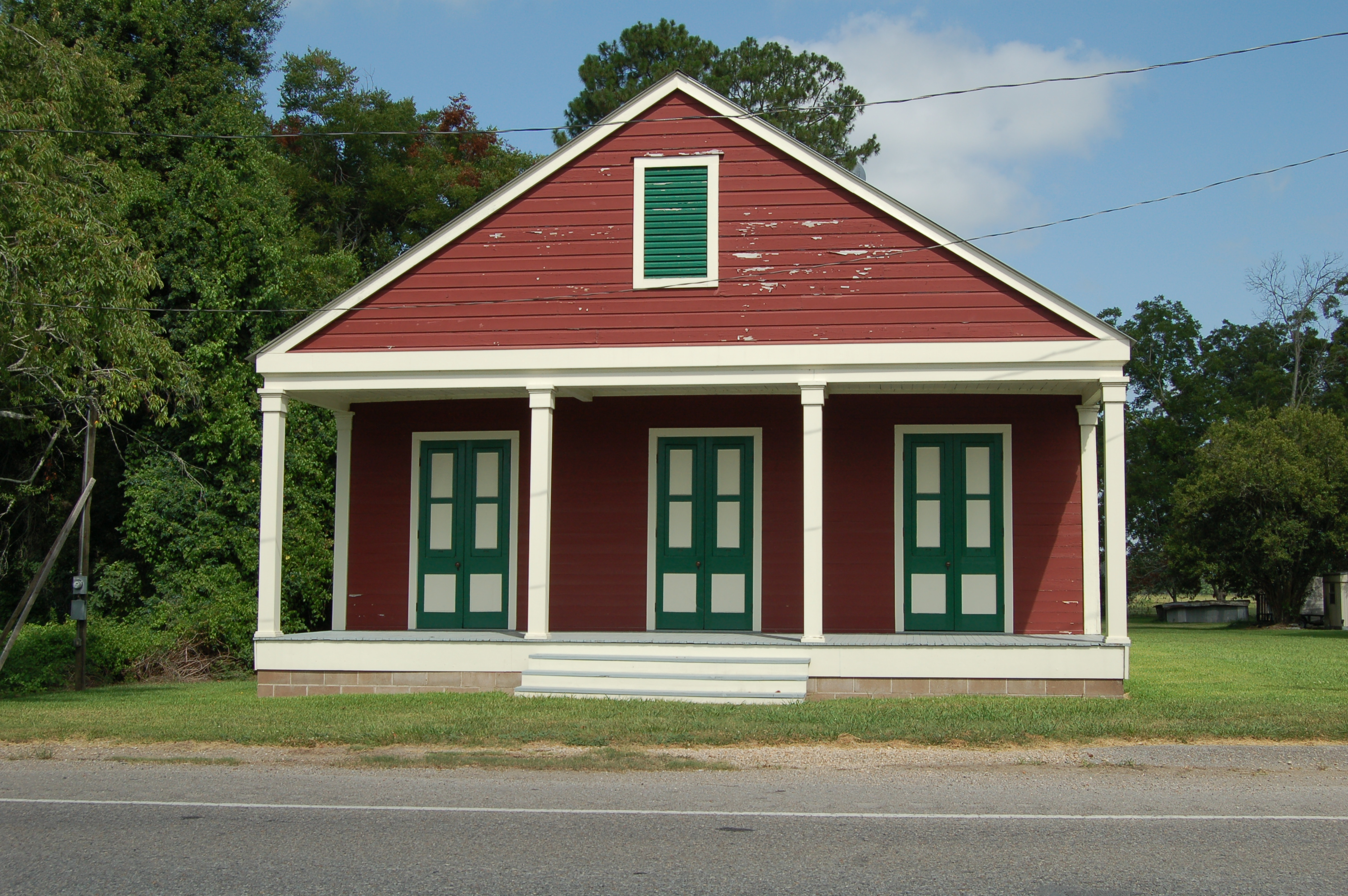
- Historic Mix Store and Post Office

- Location within Louisiana Location within the United States
- Coordinates: 30°39′28″N 91°29′06″W
- Country: United States
- State: Louisiana
- Parish: Pointe Coupee
- Elevation: 39 ft (12 m)
- Time zone: UTC-6 (Central (CST))
  - Summer (DST): UTC-5 (CDT)
- ZIP code: 70760
- Area code: 225
- GNIS feature ID: 543480
- FIPS code: 22-40700

Mix is an unincorporated community in Pointe Coupee Parish, Louisiana, United States. It is the home of the Parlange Plantation House, a National Historic Landmark and the Mix Store and Post Office, listed on the National Register of Historic Places. It is located along Louisiana Highway 1, south of New Roads.

== Etymology ==
The community was named after Alexander Mix. Mix had been a professor in Philadelphia, Pennsylvania, when he relocated to Pointe Coupee Parish. Mix introduced cotton to the area in 1802. In 1904, Mix's grandson, Thomas Mix, became the community's first postmaster. The post office was closed after World War II.
