= False River, Louisiana =

Coordinates: 30°34′14″N 91°35′34″W

False River (French: Fausse Rivière) was an unincorporated community located in southern Pointe Coupee Parish, Louisiana, United States. It was situated near present-day New Roads and the current lake of False River.

== History ==
In February 1858 a post office was established in the small community known as False River; however, it was short-lived. Less than three years later, the post office was closed. During the Civil War, the area was used as an encampment for Union troops. In 1887, the post office was re-opened as "St. Mary's, Louisiana." Public debate over the town's name caused the name to be changed to New Roads in 1888. The town was incorporated in 1894 as New Roads. The spelling of the town's name was sometimes written as "New Rhodes" in early maps and publications.

== See also ==
- List of ghost towns in Louisiana
