= Sondheimer, Louisiana =

- Unincorporated community
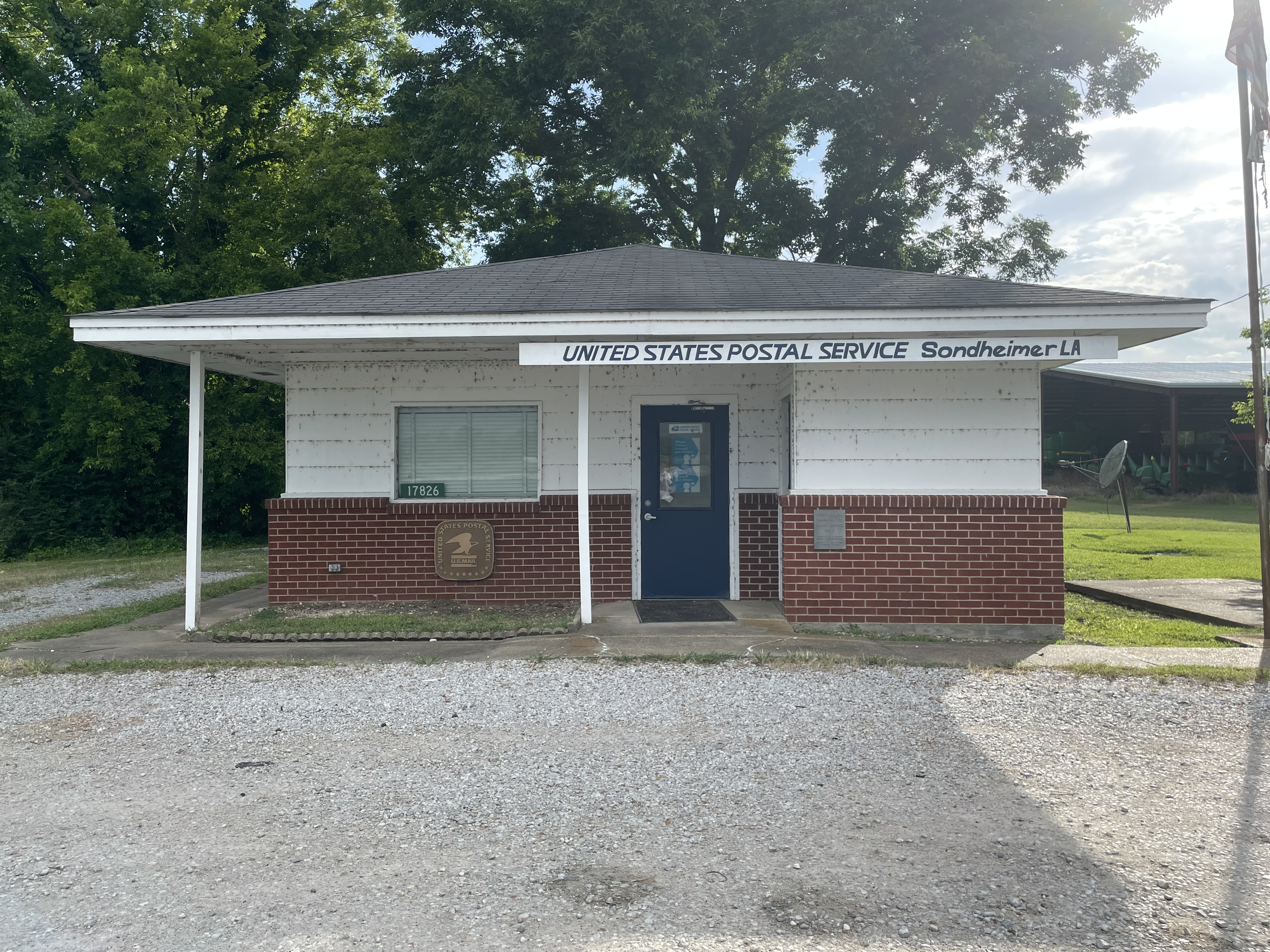

- Location within Louisiana Location within the United States
- Coordinates: 32°33′00″N 91°10′33″W
- Country: United States
- State: Louisiana
- Parish: East Carroll
- Elevation: 85 ft (26 m)
- Time zone: UTC-6 (Central (CST))
  - Summer (DST): UTC-5 (CDT)
- ZIP code: 71276
- Area code: 318
- GNIS feature ID: 539474

Sondheimer is an unincorporated community in East Carroll Parish, Louisiana, United States. The community is located on U.S. Route 65, 17.5 miles (28.2 km) south of Lake Providence. Sondheimer has a post office with ZIP code 71276.

Sondheimer was named for Emanuel Sondheimer, founder of the Chicago-based lumber company that purchased the original tracts of timberland that became the community.
