= Bayou Latenache, Louisiana =

- Ghost town
- Location of Bayou Latenache in Louisiana
- Coordinates: 30°44′57″N 91°43′15″W
- Country: United States
- State: Louisiana
- Time zone: UTC-6 (CST)
  - Summer (DST): UTC-5 (CDT)

Bayou Latenache was the name of a community located in Pointe Coupee Parish, Louisiana, United States.

== Etymology ==
There are two competing theories about the origins of the community name. One of the earliest spellings Latania may be derived from the French Latanier which means fan palm and this plant does grow in the area. However others have speculated that the name Latenache could actually be derived from the Choctaw language. The phrase Latimo-hacha would mean Boggy river in Choctaw.

== Marquis de Lafayette ==
There was a large flood sometime around 1779 which resulted in the destruction of the village. Nearly all of the inhabitants left the area and moved to nearby settlements. Then in 1810 the young American Government rewarded Marquis de Lafayette for his services in the American War of Independence by granting him the majority of the land in the area. The land grants were signed by president James Madison. This caused many of the old settlers that previously owned the land to file claims against Lafayette and the government. The claims were recognized by the U.S. government and the previous land owners were given new land grants.
