= Morrisonville, Louisiana =

Human settlement in Louisiana, United States of America

Morrisonville
- Former town
- Location in Louisiana Location in the United States
- Country: United States
- State: Louisiana
- Parish: Iberville Parish, Louisiana
- Founded: 1870s
- Founder: Former slaves
- Time zone: UTC-6 (Central)
  - Summer (DST): UTC-5 (CDT)

Morrisonville was a small town in Iberville Parish, Louisiana, United States that was contaminated with industrial pollution from a nearby Dow Chemical Company vinyl chloride factory. The town's residents — predominantly African American — were relocated in 1990 to Morrisonville Estates in Iberville Parish and Morrisonville Acres in West Baton Rouge Parish by Dow.

== History ==
The community had been founded during the 1870s by former slaves freed from a plantation near Plaquemine.

A chemical factory producing vinyl chloride was set up on land adjoining the community by the Dow Chemical Company in 1958. Initially there was a green belt separating the factory from the town, but the plant bought land from the town in 1959 and then expanded to cover 1,400 acres (5.7 km^{2}), filling all the intervening space, so much so that the plant's loudspeaker announcements could be heard inside people's houses.

== Pollution and relocation ==
In the 1980s and 1990s, chemical pollution was discovered in the town's wells. To avoid lawsuits, Dow decided to buy up the town and move its residents away to create a buffer zone around the factory. In 1989, just before the release of a federal report into toxic emissions from the factory, Dow announced that it was going to buy up all the homes and land in Morrisonville, and that if the residents refused their property would be worthless.

Although about twenty families refused to move at first, by 1993 the town was eventually abandoned. All that now remains is the graveyard of the former Nazarene Baptist Church and an open-sided prayer site, built of wood, provided by Dow for family members who return to visit the graves.

The residents were transferred to newly built homes at Morrison Acres, but many died before they could settle in. The large number of petrochemical plants producing PVC in the surrounding area, an 80-mile (130 km) stretch between Baton Rouge and New Orleans, first led to it being known as the 'Chemical Corridor' and later as Cancer Alley, and many other communities in the area have been similarly affected by groundwater pollution and other toxic emissions.
