= Lacour, Louisiana =

Unincorporated community in Louisiana

LaCour, Louisiana
- Unincorporated community
- Location within Louisiana Location within the United States
- Coordinates: 30°49′42″N 91°36′50″W
- Country: United States
- State: Louisiana
- Parish: Pointe Coupee
- Elevation: 46 ft (14 m)
- Time zone: UTC-6 (Central (CST))
  - Summer (DST): UTC-5 (CDT)
- ZIP code: 70715
- Area code: 225
- GNIS feature ID: 554963
- FIPS code: 22-40700

LaCour (pronounced Lah Coor) is an unincorporated Hamlet in the rural area of Bachelor in Pointe Coupee Parish, Louisiana, United States. It is near Raccourci Old River, an oxbow lake in the Mississippi River system. The community was formerly called Planchette.

== Etymology ==
The community is named after the Colin LaCour estate and is also the old Lacour farm land and known for the place where the LaCour’s slaves slept in small shotgun style houses. The LaCour family were major slave owners that ran a plantation in the area as early as the 1700s onto the early 1800s.
