= Anchor, Louisiana =

Anchor
- Ghost Town
- Location of Anchor in Louisiana
- Coordinates: 30°41′01″N 91°21′18″W
- Country: United States
- State: Louisiana
- Time zone: UTC-6 (CST)
  - Summer (DST): UTC-5 (CDT)

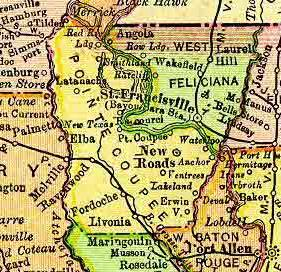
1895 map of Pointe Coupee Parish showing location of Anchor

Anchor was the name of a community located in southeastern Pointe Coupee Parish, Louisiana, United States. The community was located along the Mississippi River, north of the Pointe Coupee - West Baton Rouge Parish line.

== History ==
The community received its name during the American Civil War. A post office was established in the community in 1888. The post office was closed in 1930.
