= Dupont, Pointe Coupee Parish, Louisiana =

Unincorporated community in Louisiana

Dupont
- Unincorporated community
- Location of Dupont in Louisiana Dupont (the United States)
- Coordinates: 30°38′40″N 91°28′46″W
- Country: United States
- State: Louisiana
- Parish: Pointe Coupee
- Elevation: 33 ft (10 m)

Population (2007)
  - Total: 900
- Time zone: UTC-6 (CST)
  - Summer (DST): UTC-5 (CDT)
- ZIP code: 70749
- Area code: 225
- GNIS feature ID: 543157
- FIPS code: 22-22220

Dupont is an unincorporated community in southeastern Pointe Coupee Parish, Louisiana, United States. The community is located along Louisiana Highway 413, north of the community of Jarreau. The area falls under the service of the nearby Jarreau Post Office.

== History ==
In 1902, a group of men gathered on the island side of False River to come up with a new name for the post office what was designated to be opened in their area. After the community could not agree on a new name, Pierre Guidroz suggested that the new community be named Dupont. A box of Dupont shotgun shells was in full view and the committee decided on that name. After World War II, the post office was closed.
