= Alma, Louisiana =

Alma, Louisiana Alma
- Town
- Location of Alma in Louisiana
- Coordinates: 30°35′47″N 91°23′22″W
- Country: United States
- State: Louisiana
- Time zone: UTC-6 (CST)
  - Summer (DST): UTC-5 (CDT)

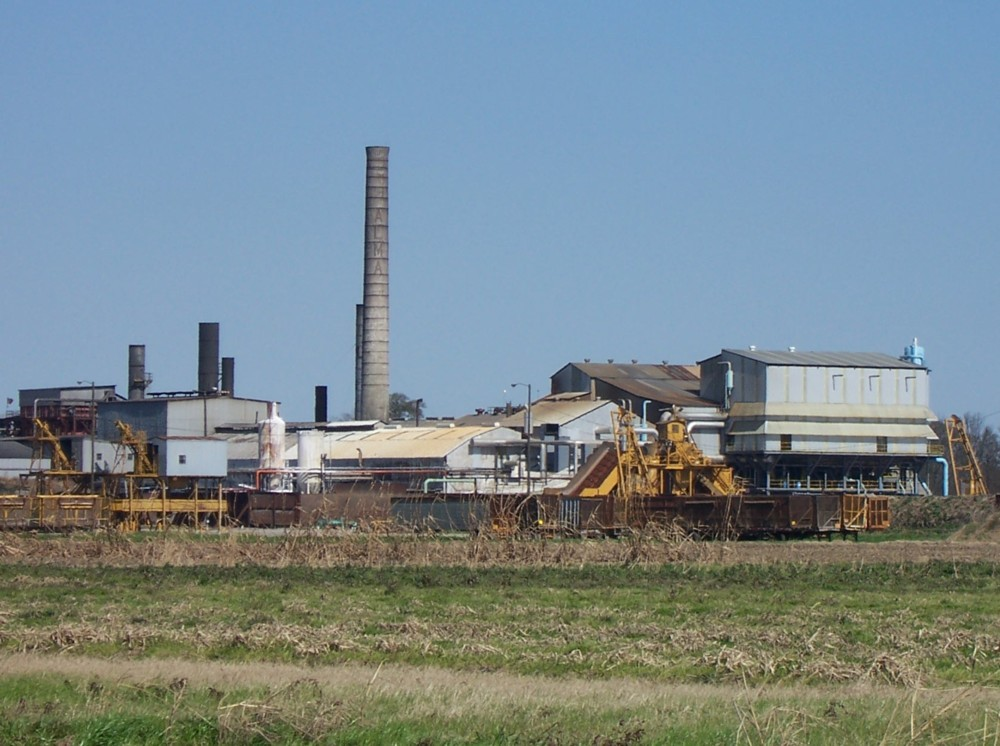
Alma Plantation Sugar Mill

Alma was the name of a community located in southeastern Pointe Coupee Parish, Louisiana, United States. The community was located east of Lakeland. The area is currently home to Pointe Coupee Parish's only operating sugar mill, Alma Plantation. Alma is one of only 11 sugar mills still operating in the state of Louisiana. It produces raw sugar and blackstrap molasses. During the harvesting of sugar cane, known locally as "the grinding season", Alma Plantation becomes one of the area's largest employers. Sugar cane is brought to this mill for processing from a number of surrounding parishes.

== History ==
The community was located on land once owned by Pointe Coupee's celebrated philanthropist, Julien Poydras. The original Alma Plantation House was constructed in 1789 along the banks of False River.

After the death of Poydras, David Barrow, a member of one of Louisiana's most prominent families, purchased the property. In 1938, Alma Plantations's 13-ton locomotive, "Dixie" was sold off to the Mississippi River Sugar Belt Railroad.

The Alma Plantation home is no longer open to the public, but the sugar mill and a country store are open to visitors.

== See also ==
- Cinclare Sugar Mill Historic District
- Laurel Valley Sugar Plantation
