= Parlange, Louisiana =

Coordinates: 30°37′42″N 91°29′15″W

Parlange (pronounced Parr lawn ja) was the name of a community located in southern Pointe Coupee Parish, Louisiana, United States. The community was along Louisiana Highway 1, on the banks of False River.

== History ==
Just northeast of Parlange is a plantation home known as Parlange Plantation. The plantation was named for Charles Parlange, a Frenchman. The home was originally owned by Marquis Vincent de Ternant. Parlange was the childhood home of Virginie Amelie Gautreau (née Avegno), descendant of the Marquis and the infamous Madam X of the John Singer Sargent portrait in the Metropolitan Museum of Art in New York City.

From 1902 to 1904, a post office served the surrounding community.
