= East Krotz Springs, Louisiana =

East Krotz Springs
- Ghost Town
- Location within the state of Louisiana
- Coordinates: 30°32′12.87″N 91°44′24.59″W
- Country: United States
- State: Louisiana
- Parish: Pointe Coupee
- Time zone: UTC-6 (Central (CST))
  - Summer (DST): UTC-5 (CDT)

East Krotz Springs is a ghost town that was located in Pointe Coupee Parish's 1st Ward, approximately 12 miles west of Livonia, Louisiana, United States. The site of the town itself is located at coordinates 30°32'12.87"N, 91°44'24.59"W, and is abandoned. United States Geological Survey maps from 1948 show the town to be located on the east bank of the Atchafalaya River at the mouth of Bayou Sherman, directly across from Krotz Springs, south of the railroad bridge.

East Krotz Springs was originally known as Latania and was the site of lumbering operations in the early 1900s. The Atchafalaya River levee broke at Latania in 1912 and 1913, flooding the southern part of Pointe Coupee Parish. Since 1939, this area has been located within the Morganza Spillway levee system and was entirely underwater again when the floodgates at the Morganza control structure to the northeast were opened in 1973 and 2011 to allow for relief of the high water level on the Mississippi River. East Krotz Springs is subject to being flooded again if the control structure gates are ever opened. There is no visible trace of the town left today.

== See also ==
- Krotz Springs - a town in neighboring St. Landry Parish.
