= Pointe Coupee Parish, Louisiana =

Parish in Louisiana, United States

Pointe Coupee Parish
- Parish
- Parish of Pointe Coupee; Paroisse de la Pointe-Coupée (French)
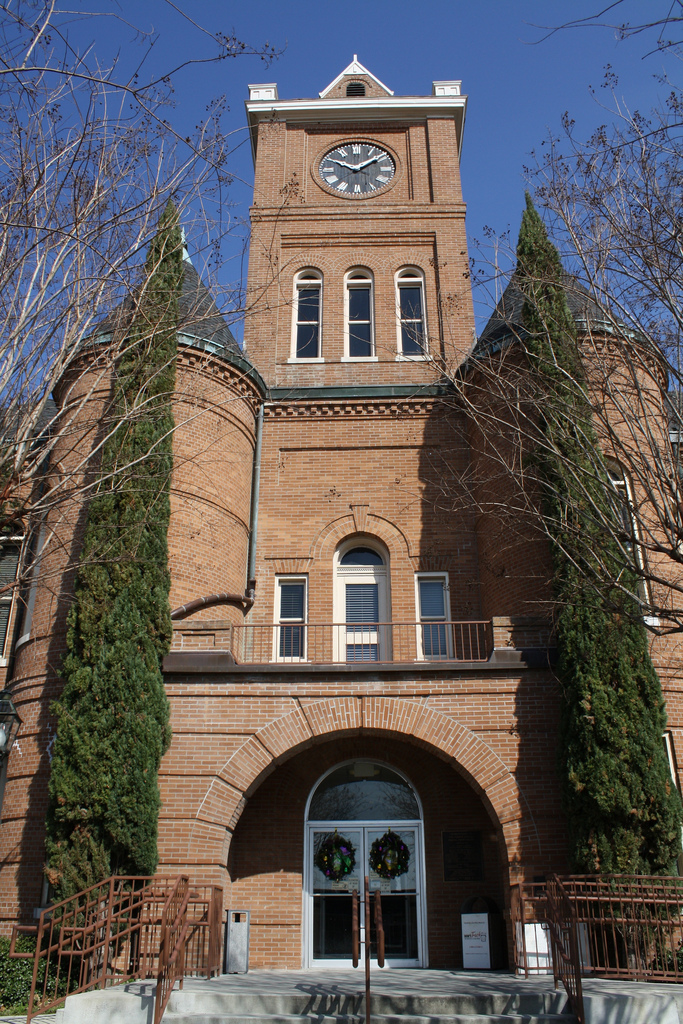
- Pointe Coupee Parish Courthouse

- Seal

- Location within the U.S. state of Louisiana
- Coordinates: 30°43′N 91°36′W
- Country: United States
- State: Louisiana
- Founded: 1807
- Named for: French for the place of the cut-off
- Seat: New Roads
- Largest city: New Roads

Area
  - Total: 591 sq mi (1,530 km^{2})
  - Land: 557 sq mi (1,440 km^{2})
  - Water: 33 sq mi (85 km^{2}) 5.6%

Population (2020)
  - Total: 20,758
  - Estimate (2025): 19,520 ▼
  - Density: 37.3/sq mi (14.4/km^{2})
- Demonym: Pointe Coupean
- Time zone: UTC−6 (Central)
  - Summer (DST): UTC−5 (CDT)
- ZIP Codes: 70715, 70729, 70732, 70736, 70747, 70749, 70752, 70753, 70755, 70756, 70759, 70760, 70762, 70773, 70783
- Area code: 225
- Congressional district: 6th
- Website: pcparish.org

Pointe Coupee Parish (/ˈpɔɪnt kəˈpiː/ or /ˈpwɑːnt kuːˈpeɪ/; French: Paroisse de la Pointe-Coupée) is a parish located in the U.S. state of Louisiana. As of the 2020 census, the population was 20,758. The parish seat is New Roads.

Pointe Coupee Parish is part of the Baton Rouge metropolitan area. In 2010, the center of population of Louisiana was located in Pointe Coupee Parish, in the city of New Roads.

== History ==
Pointe Coupee is the oldest settlement on the lower Mississippi, having been made by some wandering Canadian trappers as early as 1708. Bienville established this place as a military post, before the commencement of New Orleans, where settlers arrived in 1719, making it the third oldest settlement in Louisiana. The fort was moved in 1722 to an area near the present St. Francisville Ferry landing.

After several floods, Governor Luis de Unzaga in 1772 moved the European settlement to a new post, the so-called Post Unzaga. Recently, historians Cazorla and Polo, from the Louis de Unzaga Historical Society research team, using satellite remote sensing techniques and comparative plans from the General Archive of the Indies, have managed to locate the position of the Unzaga post, which included, along with it, a parish. After the slave rebellion of 1795 this settlement was left uninhabited. Pointe Coupee Parish (originally and recently, informally pronounced pwahnt coo-pee) was organized by European Americans in 1805 as part of the Territory of Orleans (statehood for Louisiana followed in 1812). It was originally called Pointe Coupee County, and was one of the original 12 counties of the Territory of Orleans. It was renamed as Pointe Coupee Parish in 1816. The original Pointe Coupee Parish included parts of present-day Iberville and West Baton Rouge Parishes. There were minor boundary adjustments with neighboring parishes up through 1852, when its boundaries stabilized.

In 2008, Pointe Coupee was one of the communities that suffered the most damage by Hurricane Gustav.

== Geography ==
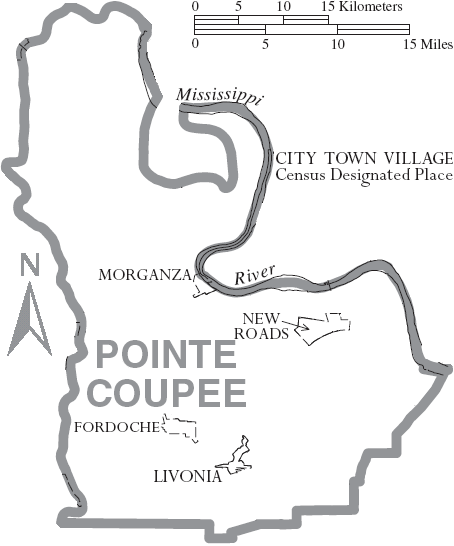
Map of Pointe Coupee Parish, Louisiana With Municipal Labels

According to the U.S. Census Bureau, the parish has a total area of 591 square miles (1,530 km^{2}), of which 557 square miles (1,440 km^{2}) is land and 33 square miles (85 km^{2}) (5.6%) is water. The land consists mainly of prairies and backswamp.

=== Major highways ===
Pointe Coupee Parish has 498.98 miles of highways within its borders.

- U.S. Highway 190
- Louisiana Highway 1
- Louisiana Highway 10
- Louisiana Highway 15
- Louisiana Highway 77
- Louisiana Highway 78
- Louisiana Highway 81
- Louisiana Highway 411
- Louisiana Highway 413
- Louisiana Highway 414
- Louisiana Highway 415
- Louisiana Highway 416
- Louisiana Highway 417
- Louisiana Highway 418
- Louisiana Highway 419
- Louisiana Highway 420
- Louisiana Highway 970
- Louisiana Highway 971
- Louisiana Highway 972
- Louisiana Highway 973
- Louisiana Highway 975
- Louisiana Highway 976
- Louisiana Highway 977
- Louisiana Highway 978
- Louisiana Highway 979
- Louisiana Highway 981
- Louisiana Highway 982
- Louisiana Highway 983
- Louisiana Highway 984
- Louisiana Highway 3050
- Louisiana Highway 3091
- Louisiana Highway 3131
- Louisiana Highway 3190

=== Major waterways ===
- Atchafalaya River
- False River
- Mississippi River
- Old River
- Raccourci Old River (not a river but an oxbow lake)
- Red River

=== Adjacent parishes ===
- Concordia Parish (north)
- West Feliciana Parish (northeast)
- West Baton Rouge Parish (east)
- Iberville Parish (south)
- St. Martin Parish (southwest)
- St. Landry Parish (west)
- Avoyelles Parish (northwest)

=== National protected area ===
- Atchafalaya National Wildlife Refuge (part)

== Communities ==
=== City ===
- New Roads (parish seat)

=== Towns ===
- Fordoche
- Livonia

=== Village ===
- Morganza

=== Census-designated place ===
- Ventress

=== Unincorporated communities ===
- Aline
- Allon
- Alma
- Anchor
- Argyle
- Bayou Latenache
- Batchelor
- Beaud
- Blanks
- Brooks
- Brownview
- Chenal
- Columbo
- Coon
- Dupont
- False River
- East Krotz Springs
- Elliot City
- Frisco
- Frogmore
- Glynn
- Hermitage
- Ingleside
- Innis
- Island
- Jacoby
- Jarreau
- Keller
- Knapp
- LaBarre
- Lacour
- Lakeland
- Leavel
- Legonier
- Lettsworth
- Lottie
- Major
- McCrea
- McKneeley
- Mix
- Morrison
- New California
- New Texas
- Oscar
- Parlange
- Patin
- Point Coupee
- Quinton
- Ravenswood
- Red Cross
- Red River Landing
- Rougon
- Seibert
- Schwabs
- Sherburne
- Shexnayder
- Smithland
- Sparks
- St. Dizier
- Torbert
- Torras
- Valverda
- Waterloo
- Wickliffe
- Williamsport

== Demographics ==
Historical population
Census	Pop.	Note	%±
1810	3,187		—
1820	4,912		54.1%
1830	5,942		21.0%
1840	7,898		32.9%
1850	11,339		43.6%
1860	17,718		56.3%
1870	12,981		−26.7%
1880	17,785		37.0%
1890	19,613		10.3%
1900	25,777		31.4%
1910	25,289		−1.9%
1920	24,697		−2.3%
1930	21,007		−14.9%
1940	24,004		14.3%
1950	21,841		−9.0%
1960	22,488		3.0%
1970	22,002		−2.2%
1980	24,045		9.3%
1990	22,540		−6.3%
2000	22,763		1.0%
2010	22,802		0.2%
2020	20,758		−9.0%
2025 (est.)	19,520	▼	−6.0%
U.S. Decennial Census; 1790-1960 1900-1990; 1990-2000 2010 Estimate source

Pointe Coupee Parish, Louisiana – Racial and ethnic composition Note: the US Census treats Hispanic/Latino as an ethnic category. This table excludes Latinos from the racial categories and assigns them to a separate category. Hispanics/Latinos may be of any race.
Race / Ethnicity (NH = Non-Hispanic)	Pop 1980	Pop 1990	Pop 2000	Pop 2010	Pop 2020	% 1980	% 1990	% 2000	% 2010	% 2020
White alone (NH)	13,730	13,074	13,720	13,748	12,245	57.10%	58.00%	60.27%	60.29%	58.99%
Black or African American alone (NH)	9,854	9,244	8,553	8,247	7,221	40.98%	41.01%	37.57%	36.17%	34.79%
Native American or Alaska Native alone (NH)	10	29	38	16	37	0.04%	0.13%	0.17%	0.07%	0.18%
Asian alone (NH)	22	14	56	57	60	0.09%	0.06%	0.25%	0.25%	0.29%
Native Hawaiian or Pacific Islander alone (NH)	x	x	0	0	2	x	x	0.00%	0.00%	0.01%
Other race alone (NH)	17	13	38	41	57	0.07%	0.06%	0.17%	0.18%	0.27%
Mixed race or Multiracial (NH)	x	x	113	201	511	x	x	0.50%	0.88%	2.46%
Hispanic or Latino (any race)	412	166	245	492	625	1.71%	0.74%	1.08%	2.16%	3.01%
Total	24,045	22,540	22,763	22,802	20,758	100.00%	100.00%	100.00%	100.00%	100.00%

As of the census of 2000, there were 22,763 people, 8,397 households, and 6,171 families residing in the parish. The population density was 41 inhabitants per square mile (16/km^{2}). There were 10,297 housing units at an average density of 18 per square mile (6.9/km^{2}). The racial makeup of the parish was 68.91% White, 29.61% Black or African American, 0.17% Native American, 0.25% Asian, 0.32% from other races, and 0.56% from two or more races. 1.08% of the population were Hispanic or Latino of any race. 93.61% of the population spoke only English at home, while 4.89% spoke French or Cajun French, 0.96% spoke Spanish, and 0.73% spoke Louisiana Creole French.

By the publication of the 2020 United States census, there were 20,758 people, 8,960 households, and 5,625 families residing in the parish, reflecting a slight population decline. Among the population in 2020, the racial and ethnic makeup of the parish was 58.99% non-Hispanic white, 34.79% Black or African American, 0.18% Native American, 0.29% Asian, 0.01% Pacific Islander, 2.74% other or multiracial, and 3.01% Hispanic or Latino of any race.

In 2000, the median income for a household in the parish was $30,618, and the median income for a family was $36,625. Males had a median income of $35,022 versus $20,759 for females. The per capita income for the parish was $15,387, ranking 23rd out of 64 parishes. About 18.70% of families and 23.10% of the population were below the poverty line, including 30.20% of those under age 18 and 23.90% are the age of 65 and older.

Religiously, Christianity is the dominant religion being part of the Bible Belt. The largest denomination by membership as of 2020 has been the Catholic Church (according to the Association of Religion Data Archives). Southern Baptists were the second largest denomination by membership.

== Economy ==
Nan Ya Plastics Corporation America has a large plant near Batchelor. Another large employer is NRG / Big Cajun 1 & 2 power plants near New Roads. The parish's economy is heavily reliant upon agriculture, with sugar cane being one of the main cash crops.

== Education ==
=== Primary and secondary schools ===
The Pointe Coupee Parish School Board serves the parish. As of 2014 the sole secondary school operated by the parish school board is Livonia High School, serving grades 7 through 12. Pointe Coupee Central High School was closed down in 2014. Current public schools include Stem Magnet Academy, Valverda Elementary, Rougon, Rosenwald, and Upper Pointe Coupee Elementary.

Private

- Catholic High School of Pointe Coupee (of the Roman Catholic Diocese of Baton Rouge)
- False River Academy

=== Post Secondary ===
The parish is in the service area of South Louisiana Community College.

Additionally, Pointe Coupee Parish is home to one of the satellite campuses of Baton Rouge Community College. This campus, located in New Roads, offers several technical, academic, and other courses.

== National Guard ==
A Co of the 769th BEB (Brigade Engineer Battalion) is an Engineer Company (Combat) that resides in New Roads, Louisiana. This unit is part of the 256TH IBCT and deployed to Iraq in 2004-5 and 2010.

== Law enforcement ==
Pointe Coupee Parish Sheriff's Office

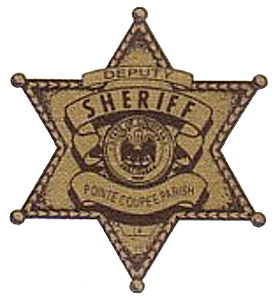
- Abbreviation: PCSO

Agency overview
- Formed: 1807

Jurisdictional structure
- General nature: Local civilian police

Operational structure
- Headquarters: New Roads, Louisiana
- Deputy Sheriffs: 125
- Agency executive: Rene Thibodeaux, Sheriff

Facilities
- Stations: 3

Website
- Official website

The Pointe Coupee Sheriff's Office is the chief law enforcement agency in Pointe Coupee Parish. The sheriff's office is responsible for routine law enforcement patrols in the parish. There are several divisions besides the road patrol, including the parish prison, a water patrol, a mounted horse patrol, an aviation unit, a criminal investigations division, and bailiffs for the courthouse. This department employs over 100 full-time deputies, as well as several part-time deputies. The department's main office is located in the parish courthouse in New Roads.

== Notable residents ==
- Lindy Boggs (1916–2013) – U.S. Representative from Louisiana's 2nd congressional district and U.S. Ambassador to the Holy See
- Brian J. Costello - native and lifelong resident of New Roads, author of more than two dozen books
- Ernest Gaines – author
- Clark Gaudin - former state representative from East Baton Rouge Parish
- Buddy Guy - blues guitarist and singer
- Gwendolyn Midlo Hall, historian, did extensive research and writing about slavery in Louisiana
- Russel L. Honoré - retired Lieutenant General, U.S. Army
- J. Thomas Jewell - state representative 1936–1968; Speaker of the Louisiana House 1960–1964
- Catherine D. Kimball - former Chief Justice of Louisiana Supreme Court; former judge of the Louisiana 18th Judicial District Court, 1983–1993
- Major General John Archer Lejeune, career military officer and Commandant of the US Marine Corps
- Norma McCorvey - anonymous plaintiff in 1973 U.S. Supreme Court landmark abortion case, Roe v. Wade.
- deLesseps Story Morrison (1912–1964), born in New Roads, elected four times as mayor of New Orleans, ran unsuccessfully three times for governor of Louisiana, later US ambassador to the Organization of American States.
- Charles Parlange - former Chief Justice of Louisiana Supreme Court
- Julien Poydras – territorial U.S. Representative for Louisiana; 1st State Senate President, philanthropist
- Patrick Queen- Linebacker for Baltimore Ravens, Former LSU player
- William Priestley (1771–1838), son of the famous English chemist and philosopher Joseph Priestley
- James Ryder Randall - poet, teacher at Poydras Academy, 1856–1860, wrote the state song of Maryland, "Maryland, My Maryland" while living in Pointe Coupée Parish
- Nauman Scott - judge of the United States District Court for the Western District of Louisiana, based in Alexandria
- Major Thibaut - former state representative for District 18; first Parish President
- H. C. Tounoir - former state representative
- Chris Williams - offensive tackle for the St. Louis Rams
- Clyde Kimball - former State Representative and former deputy secretary of the Louisiana Department of Wildlife and Fisheries

== Politics ==
Prior to 2008, Pointe Coupee Parish was a Democratic stronghold in presidential elections, only failing to back the party's nominees four times between 1912 and 2004 even as the South began trending more Republican in presidential elections. Since 2008 it has consistently supported Republican nominees.

United States presidential election results for Pointe Coupee Parish, Louisiana
Year	Republican		Democratic		Third party(ies)	
Year	No.	%	No.	%	No.	%
1912	55	12.09%	304	66.81%	96	21.10%
1916	37	10.48%	301	85.27%	15	4.25%
1920	143	26.00%	407	74.00%	0	0.00%
1924	146	27.65%	369	69.89%	13	2.46%
1928	102	7.12%	1,330	92.88%	0	0.00%
1932	65	5.95%	1,027	94.05%	0	0.00%
1936	116	7.56%	1,419	92.44%	0	0.00%
1940	247	11.63%	1,877	88.37%	0	0.00%
1944	271	15.88%	1,436	84.12%	0	0.00%
1948	198	10.01%	402	20.31%	1,379	69.68%
1952	1,174	45.88%	1,385	54.12%	0	0.00%
1956	1,332	45.03%	1,542	52.13%	84	2.84%
1960	674	16.39%	2,953	71.81%	485	11.79%
1964	2,327	50.87%	2,247	49.13%	0	0.00%
1968	850	11.34%	3,139	41.87%	3,508	46.79%
1972	3,192	46.58%	3,133	45.72%	528	7.70%
1976	2,567	32.59%	5,147	65.35%	162	2.06%
1980	3,667	35.73%	6,395	62.31%	201	1.96%
1984	5,477	44.58%	6,732	54.79%	78	0.63%
1988	4,333	39.64%	6,308	57.71%	289	2.64%
1992	3,563	31.47%	6,512	57.52%	1,247	11.01%
1996	3,545	31.28%	6,835	60.32%	952	8.40%
2000	4,710	43.48%	5,813	53.67%	309	2.85%
2004	5,429	48.17%	5,712	50.68%	130	1.15%
2008	6,702	53.90%	5,516	44.36%	217	1.75%
2012	6,548	53.91%	5,436	44.75%	163	1.34%
2016	6,789	57.72%	4,764	40.51%	208	1.77%
2020	7,503	60.65%	4,683	37.85%	185	1.50%
2024	7,319	63.26%	4,132	35.71%	119	1.03%

== See also ==
- National Register of Historic Places listings in Pointe Coupee Parish, Louisiana
- Pointe Coupee Parish Sheriff's Office
