= Atchafalaya River =

Distributary of the Mississippi River in Louisiana, United States

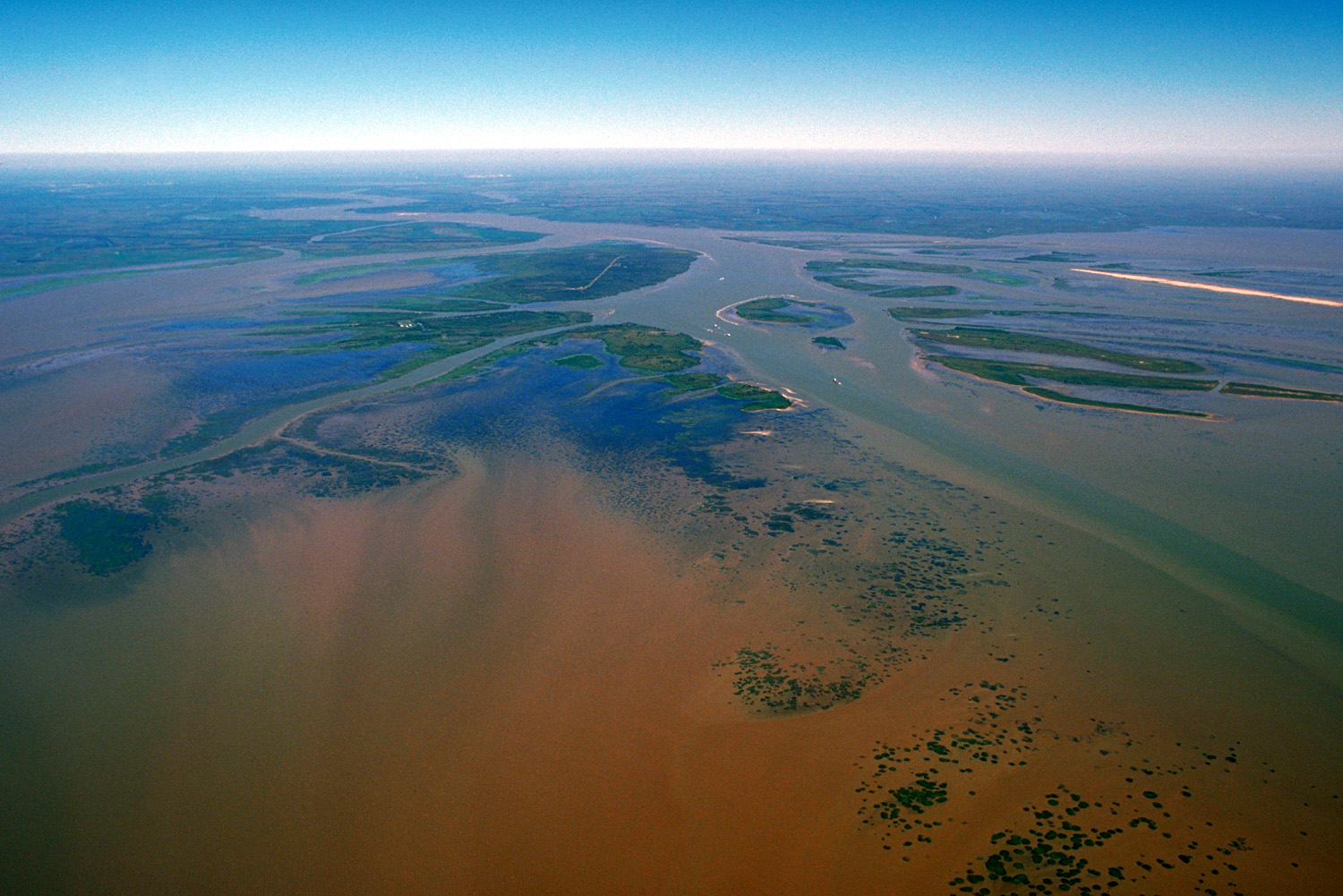
- Atchafalaya River delta on the Gulf of Mexico; view upriver to the northwest.
- Etymology: Choctaw for "long river"

Location
- Country: United States
- State: Louisiana
- Parishes: Avoyelles; Pointe Coupee; St. Landry; St. Martin; Iberville; Iberia; St. Mary; Terrebonne
- City: Morgan City, Louisiana

Physical characteristics
- Source: Mississippi River
- 2nd source: Red River of the South
- Source confluence: Old River Control Structure
- Mouth: Atchafalaya Bay, Gulf of Mexico
  - coordinates: 29°28′46″N 91°16′25″W
- Length: 137 mi (220 km)
- Discharge
  - location: Simmesport, Louisiana
  - average: 218,440 cu/ft. per sec.

The Atchafalaya River (/əˌtʃæf.əˈlaɪ.ə/) is a 137-mile-long (220 km) distributary of the Mississippi River and Red River in south central Louisiana in the United States. It flows south, just west of the Mississippi River, and is the fifth largest river in North America, by discharge. The name Atchafalaya comes from Choctaw for 'long river', from hachcha, 'river', and falaya, 'long'.

== Atchafalaya Basin ==
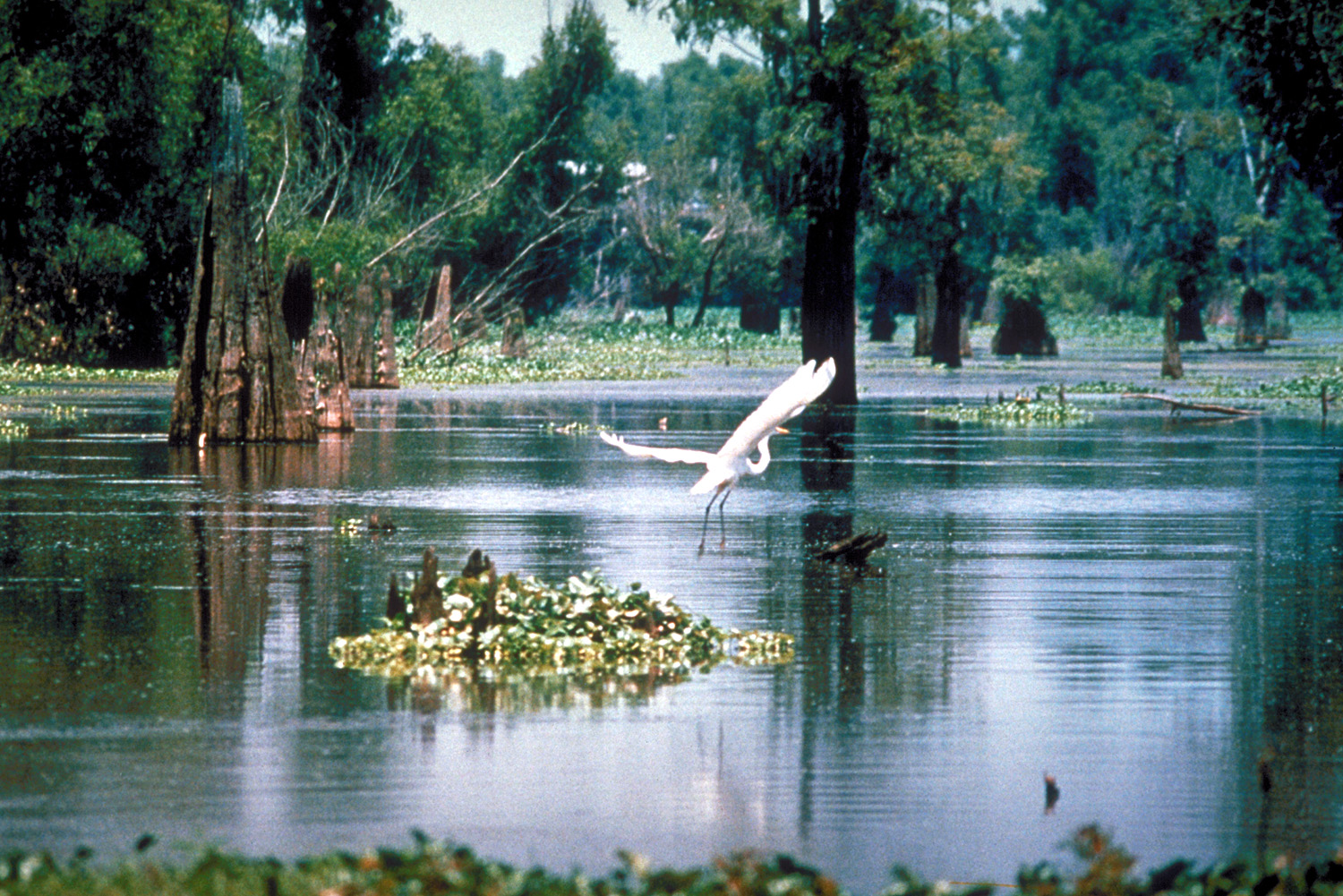
Atchafalaya Basin Sherburne Complex Wildlife Management Area

The Atchafalaya River is navigable and provides a significant industrial shipping channel for the state of Louisiana. It is the cultural heart of the Cajun Country.

The maintenance of the river as a navigable channel of the Mississippi River has been a significant project of the U.S. Army Corps of Engineers for more than a century. Natural development of the river channel, coupled with channel training and maintenance for flood control and navigation, have combined to isolate the river from the swamp. The river valley forms the Atchafalaya Basin and Atchafalaya Swamp located in southern Louisiana near the Gulf of Mexico.

The Atchafalaya became a main distributary of the Mississippi in 1839 to 1849 when locals removed a huge log jam (the Great Raft) that was obstructing the Atchafalaya River.

== Old River Control Structure ==
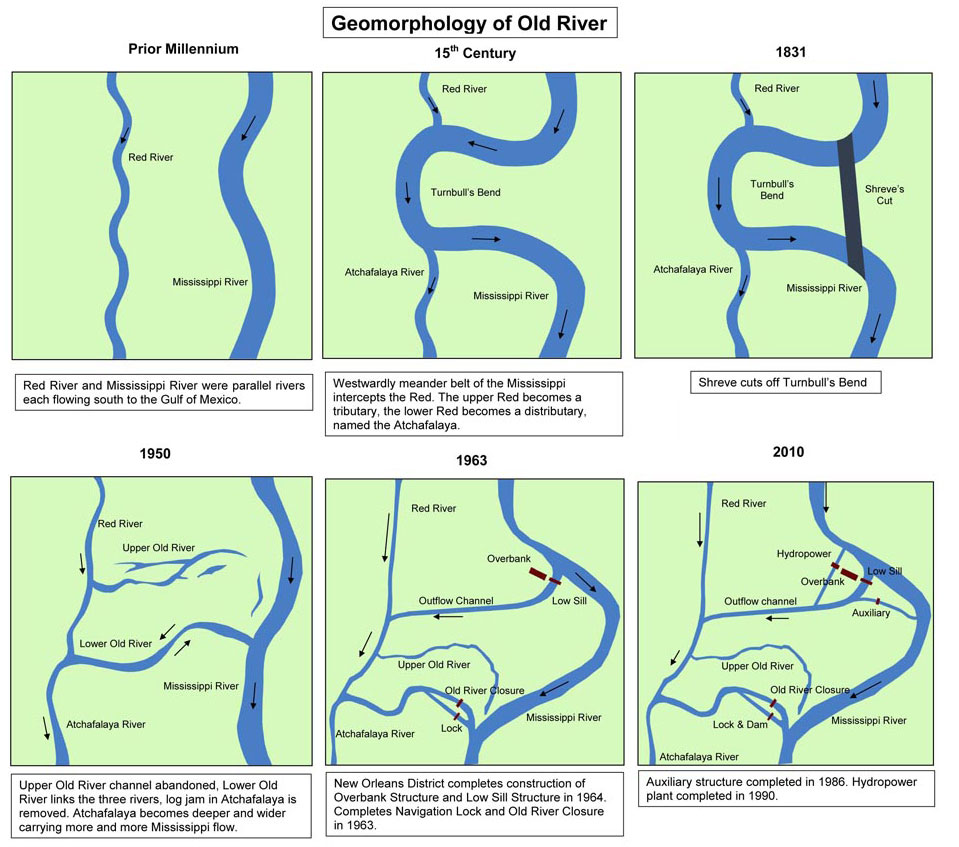
Formation of the Atchafalaya River and construction of the Old River Control Structure

The river is formed near Simmesport at the confluence of the Red River with the Mississippi, where the Mississippi connects to the Red River by the 7-mile-long (11 km) canalized Old River (part of the Old River Control Structure). It receives 30% of the combined flow of the Red and Mississippi Rivers. (The remaining 70% continues down the Mississippi River.) The volume the Atchafalaya receives from the Mississippi is controlled by the Old River Control Structure, a system of a low-sill structure, an auxiliary structure, an overbank structure, a navigation lock, and a power plant near Red River Landing, Louisiana. In times of extreme flooding, the Morganza Spillway further downstream is also used to regulate volume.

In 1942 part of the flow of the Atchafalaya River was diverted through Wax Lake to the Gulf of Mexico further west.

During the 2011 Mississippi River floods, the Old River complex was discharging more than 706,000 cubic feet per second (20,000 m^{3}/s) into the Atchafalaya River, and the Morganza Floodway was discharging one-fourth of its capacity. If the Mississippi were allowed to flow freely, the shorter and steeper Atchafalaya would capture the main flow of the Mississippi, permitting the river to bypass its current path through the important ports of Baton Rouge and New Orleans. Despite control efforts, some researchers believe the likelihood of this event increases each year due to natural forces inherent to river deltas.

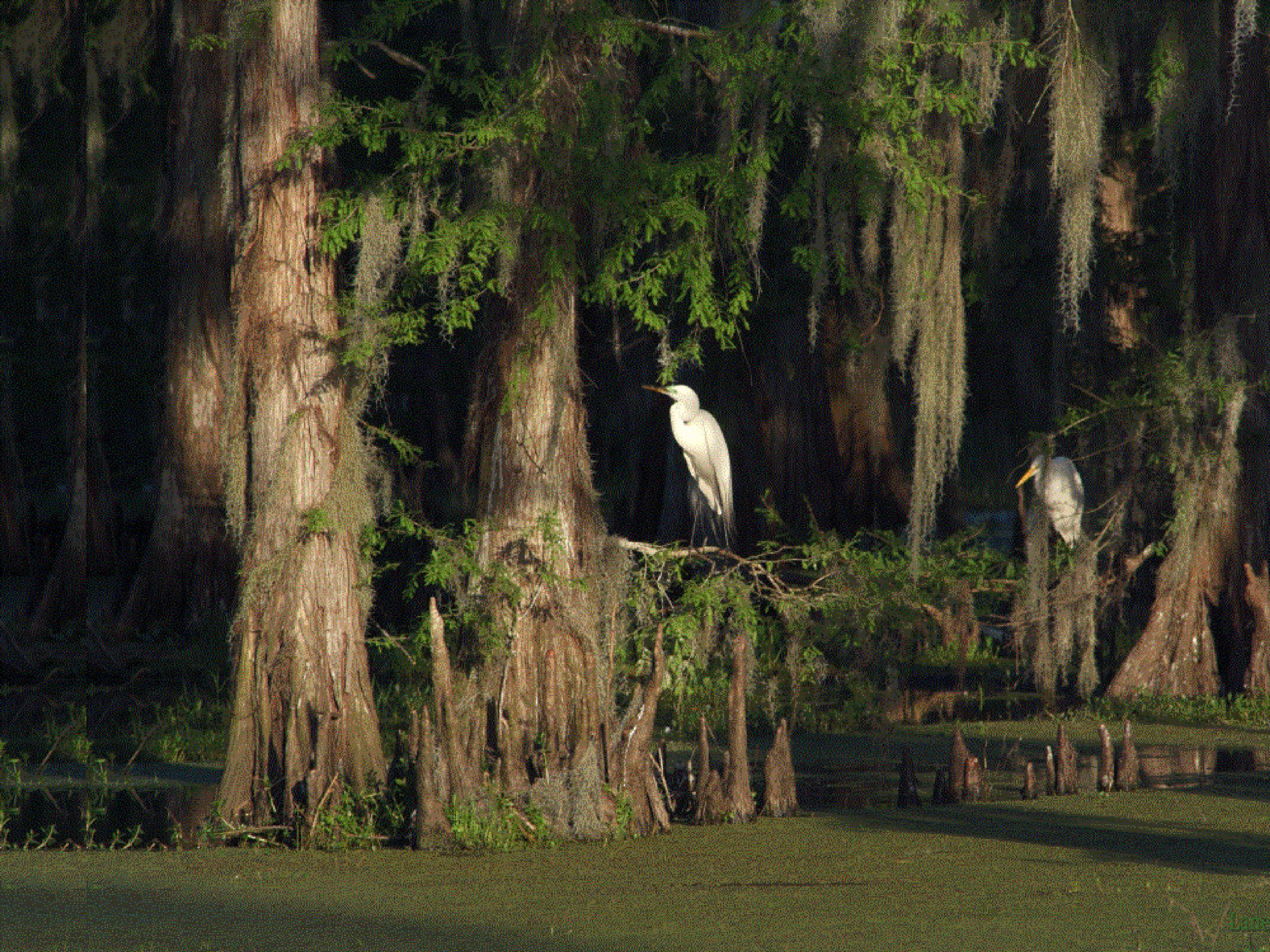
Two egrets on the limbs of a cypress in the Atchafalaya flood basin

The Atchafalaya River meanders south as a channel of the Mississippi, through extensive levees and floodways, past Morgan City, and empties into the Gulf in Atchafalaya Bay approximately 15 miles (24 km) south of Morgan City. Since the late 20th century, the river has been forming a new delta in the bay, the only place on the Louisiana coastline that is gaining ground rather than eroding.

== Atchafalaya National Heritage Area ==
The river's valley was designated Atchafalaya National Heritage Area in 2006.

== See also ==
- Atchafalaya Basin Bridge
- List of Louisiana rivers
- Mississippi River Delta
