= Louisiana Highway 38 =

State highway in Louisiana, United States

Louisiana Highway 38

- Route of LA 38 highlighted in red

Route information
- Maintained by Louisiana DOTD
- Length: 48.573 mi (78.171 km)
- Existed: 1955 renumbering–present

Major junctions
- West end: LA 10 in Coleman Town
- LA 43 in Easleyville; I-55 in Kentwood; US 51 in Kentwood; LA 25 in Clifton
- East end: LA 430 south of Hackley

Location
- Country: United States
- State: Louisiana
- Parishes: St. Helena, Tangipahoa, Washington

Highway system
- Louisiana State Highway System; Interstate; US; State; Scenic
← LA 37	→ LA 39
← SR 70	SR 71	→ SR 72

Louisiana Highway 38 (LA 38) is a state highway located in southeastern Louisiana. It runs 48.57 miles (78.17 km) in an east–west direction from LA 10 in Coleman Town to LA 430 south of Hackley.

The route traverses the rural pine forests in three of the state's Florida Parishes, crossing three rivers along the way: the Tickfaw, Tangipahoa, and Bogue Chitto. LA 38 runs north of the parallel LA 10 and encounters only two populated areas of significance: the town of Kentwood in Tangipahoa Parish and the small unincorporated community of Mount Hermon in Washington Parish. In Kentwood, the highway intersects both Interstate 55 (I-55) and U.S. Highway 51 (US 51).

LA 38 was designated in the 1955 Louisiana Highway renumbering, replacing the former State Route 71. It also absorbed the former State Route 262-D on its east end and a portion of State Route 1223 on its west end to connect with the cross-state LA 10 near Chipola.

== Route description ==
From the west, LA 38 begins at a junction with LA 10 about midway between Clinton and Greensburg. The junction is located in Coleman Town, a small rural community in St. Helena Parish. The undivided two-lane highway briefly heads northeast to Chipola, intersecting LA 432, then turns due east to Easleyville. Here, LA 38 crosses LA 43, another connection to the parish seat at Greensburg. Just east of Easleyville, the highway crosses the Tickfaw River and has a short concurrency with LA 441, which parallels LA 43 throughout the parish. 5.5 miles (8.9 km) later, LA 38 crosses into Tangipahoa Parish.

LA 38 enters the town of Kentwood and becomes known locally as Avenue G. The highway passes through a diamond interchange with I-55 at exit 61, connecting with Hammond, Louisiana to the south and Jackson, Mississippi to the north. Widening to an undivided four-lane highway, LA 38 serves as the town's primary east–west thoroughfare and passes a number of small businesses. After several blocks, the route intersects US 51 (3rd Street), which serves local traffic along the I-55 corridor. Narrowing back to two lanes, LA 38 crosses the parallel Canadian National Railway (CN) line at grade and exits the town at the first of several small bridges over the Tangipahoa River and its tributaries. East of Kentwood, LA 38 intersects LA 1054 and LA 1061 just north of Spring Creek and exits Tangipahoa Parish about 2.5 miles (4.0 km) beyond an intersection with LA 1056.

Crossing into Washington Parish, LA 38 has a brief concurrency with LA 450 north of Sunny Hill and loops northward to pass through the small community of Mount Hermon. Turning back to the south, LA 38 intersects LA 438 at the center of the community. Over the next 6.5 miles (10.5 km), the highway gradually resumes its eastward course before crossing the sandy beaches of the Bogue Chitto River. It then intersects LA 25 at Clifton, connecting with Franklinton, Louisiana to the south and Tylertown, Mississippi to the north. LA 38 follows a serpentine alignment for its final 6.3 miles (10.1 km) and terminates at a junction with LA 430 south of Hackley.

=== Route classification and data ===
LA 38 is classified by the Louisiana Department of Transportation and Development (La DOTD) as a rural major collector, except for the portion east of Clifton, which is a rural minor collector. Daily traffic volume in 2013 peaked at 7,000 vehicles in Kentwood and tapered to less than 2,000 vehicles at either end of the route. The posted speed limit is 55 mph (90 km/h) for most of the route but is reduced to 35 mph (55 km/h) within Kentwood and Mount Hermon.

== History ==
=== Pre-1955 route numbering ===
State Route 71
- Location: Chipola–Clifton
- Length: 40.1 mi (64.5 km)
- Existed: 1921–1955

The Louisiana Highway Commission and the state's first system of numbered highways were authorized by an act of the Louisiana Legislature in 1921. At that time, the majority of the modern LA 38 extending from Chipola in St. Helena Parish to Clifton in Washington Parish was designated as State Route 71. As its official description indicates, Route 71 also turned south at Clifton and overlapped what is now LA 25 into Franklinton. However, this overlap was eliminated sometime after 1937.

Route 71. Beginning at Chipola, through Kentwood, Mt. Hermon, Clifton to Franklinton.

— 1921 legislative route description

By 1927, the entirety of Route 71 had been improved with a gravel surface. Paving of the route was fragmentary and began in the late 1940s. The portion between the Tangipahoa River and the Washington Parish line was completed in 1949, along with two small segments through Mount Hermon and Clifton. In 1951, paving was completed through Kentwood and continuously to Mount Hermon. In 1953, paving was extended west from Kentwood to Easleyville and east from Mount Hermon to Clifton. The remainder of Route 71 in St. Helena Parish was improved after the 1955 Louisiana Highway renumbering.

The western and eastern ends of the modern LA 38 have a convoluted history due to the early practices of highway numbering in Louisiana. The western portion between Coleman Town and Chipola, connecting the route to what is now LA 10, was added to the state highway system in 1928. However, it was not made an extension of Route 71 but was instead given a different number, State Route 290. Two years later, this road segment was overlapped by a longer north–south route designated as State Route 1223, and the now redundant designation of Route 290 was eventually dropped. Meanwhile, the eastern segment of the modern LA 38 extending from Clifton to south of Hackley was originally part of State Route 262, another addition to the system in 1928. Its route description had an anomaly that gave it two branches extending from Hackley: one to Clifton and another to Franklinton. To distinguish the two, the Hackley–Clifton branch was given a "-D" suffix during the 1930s. Both segments of LA 38 not part of the former Route 71 remained gravel surfaced throughout their existence.

=== Post-1955 route history ===
The above highway segments were joined together under the single designation of LA 38 when the Louisiana Department of Highways, the successor to the Highway Commission, renumbered the state highway system in 1955.

Class "B": La 38—From a junction with La 10 at or near Chipola through or near Kentwood and Mt. Hermon to a junction with La 25 at or near Clifton.
Class "C": La 38—From a junction with La 25 at or near Clifton northeasterly to a junction with La 430 south of Hackley.

— 1955 legislative route description

With the 1955 renumbering, the state highway department initially categorized all routes into three classes: "A" (primary), "B" (secondary), and "C" (farm-to-market). This system has since been updated and replaced by a more specific functional classification system.

Within five years of the renumbering, the last two segments of gravel roadway in St. Helena Parish were eliminated. Paving was completed between Coleman Town and Chipola in 1956 and extended east to Easleyville by 1960. The only change to the route of LA 38 since its creation involved the elimination of a zigzag at the Illinois Central Railroad (now Canadian National Railway) crossing in Kentwood. The original alignment turned north from Avenue G onto 1st Street then east onto Avenue F and proceeded across the rail line. In the 1970s, Avenue G was extended directly across the rail line. The older railroad crossing remains in use as a local road and serves the Kentwood Co-op facility.

== Major intersections ==
Parish	Location	mi	km	Destinations	Notes
St. Helena	Coleman Town	0.000	0.000	LA 10 – Greensburg, Clinton	Western terminus
St. Helena	Chipola	2.498	4.020	LA 432 west	Eastern terminus of LA 432
St. Helena	Easleyville	9.453– 9.493	15.213– 15.278	LA 43 – Liverpool, Greensburg	
St. Helena		10.522	16.934	LA 441 north	West end of LA 441 concurrency
St. Helena		11.083– 11.111	17.836– 17.881	LA 441 south	East end of LA 441 concurrency
Tangipahoa		17.083	27.492	LA 1050 south	Northern terminus of LA 1050
Tangipahoa	Kentwood	19.389– 19.512	31.204– 31.402	I-55 – Hammond, Jackson	Exit 61 on I-55
Tangipahoa	Kentwood	20.047	32.263	LA 1049 south (9th Street)	Northern terminus of LA 1049
Tangipahoa	Kentwood	20.367	32.778	US 51 (3rd Street) – Amite, McComb	
Tangipahoa		21.441– 21.542	34.506– 34.668	Bridge over Tangipahoa River	
Tangipahoa		24.143	38.854	LA 1054 / LA 1061 south	Northern terminus of LA 1061
Tangipahoa		27.798	44.737	LA 1056 east	Western terminus of LA 1056
Washington		31.339	50.435	LA 450 south – Sunny Hill, Clifton	West end of LA 450 concurrency
Washington		33.058	53.202	LA 450 north / LA 1055 west	East end of LA 450 concurrency; west end of LA 1055 concurrency
Washington	Mount Hermon	34.349	55.279	LA 438 east – Warnerton	Western terminus of LA 438
Washington		35.080	56.456	LA 1055 north	East end of LA 1055 concurrency
Washington		40.895– 41.049	65.814– 66.062	Bridge over Bogue Chitto River	
Washington	Clifton	42.287	68.054	LA 25 – Franklinton, Tylertown	
Washington		48.573	78.171	LA 430 – Franklinton	Eastern terminus
1.000 mi = 1.609 km; 1.000 km = 0.621 mi: Concurrency terminus
