= Louisiana Highway 43 =

State highway in Louisiana, United States

Louisiana Highway 43

- Route of LA 43 highlighted in red

Route information
- Maintained by Louisiana DOTD
- Length: 44.380 mi (71.423 km)
- Existed: 1955 renumbering–present

Major junctions
- South end: LA 42 west of Springfield
- I-12 south of Albany; US 190 in Albany; LA 40 southeast of Montpelier; LA 16 in Montpelier; LA 10 in Greensburg; LA 38 at Easleyville
- North end: MS 568 at Mississippi state line north of Easleyville

Location
- Country: United States
- State: Louisiana
- Parishes: Livingston, St. Helena

Highway system
- Louisiana State Highway System; Interstate; US; State; Scenic
← LA 42	→ LA 44

Louisiana Highway 43 (LA 43) is a state highway located in southeastern Louisiana. It runs 44.38 miles (71.42 km) in a north–south direction from LA 42 west of Springfield to the Mississippi state line north of Easleyville, where it continues as Mississippi Highway 568 (MS 568).

A primarily rural route, LA 43 connects four small municipalities in Livingston and St. Helena parishes, including Springfield, Albany, Montpelier, and Greensburg. The latter is also the seat of St. Helena Parish.

LA 43 entirely parallels the Interstate 55 (I-55) corridor, located between five and ten miles (8.0–16.1 km) east in neighboring Tangipahoa Parish. Over the course of its route, LA 43 intersects such east–west routes as I-12, U.S. Highway 190 (US 190), LA 40, LA 16, LA 10, and LA 38, all of which connect to I-55.

LA 43 was designated in the 1955 Louisiana Highway renumbering from portions of former State Route 46 and State Route 37.

== Route description ==
=== Livingston Parish ===
From the south, LA 43 begins at a junction with LA 42 just outside the Livingston Parish town of Springfield. The route heads north through an area known as Hungarian Settlement and passes through an interchange with I-12 at exit 32, connecting with the cities of Hammond and Baton Rouge. Immediately north of I-12 is an intersection with LA 1040 (Old Baton Rouge Highway), an older alignment of US 190. LA 43 enters the village of Albany and becomes known as Montpelier Road. In the center of town, LA 43 intersects US 190 (Florida Boulevard), which serves local traffic along the I-12 corridor. Immediately north of this junction, LA 43 crosses the Canadian National Railway (CN) line at grade.

North of Albany, LA 43 travels between the Tickfaw River and Little Natalbany River toward the St. Helena Parish village of Montpelier. During this stretch are junctions with LA 1064, LA 442, and LA 40, connecting to the Tangipahoa Parish communities of Natalbany, Tickfaw, and Independence, respectively.

=== St. Helena Parish ===
About three miles (4.8 km) after crossing into St. Helena Parish, LA 43 turns west at a four-way intersection to run concurrent with westbound LA 16 and southbound LA 441 across the Tickfaw River into Montpelier. After following 4th Street into town, LA 43 makes a turn opposite Durbin Road to resume its northern course. Six miles (9.7 km) later, LA 43 intersects LA 1045, which parallels LA 16 toward Amite City.

Four miles (6.4 km) later, LA 43 enters the town of Greensburg, the parish seat. Traveling along Sitman Street, the route passes the parish school board and clerk of court buildings. It then makes a one-block jog west via LA 10 (North Main Street) and north again onto Kendrick Street, where it passes the parish sheriff's office and hospital complexes.

During its final 12.2 miles (19.6 km) north of Greensburg, LA 43 intersects LA 1043 at Liverpool, followed closely by LA 38 at Easleyville, which connects to the town of Kentwood. LA 43 reaches its northern terminus at the Mississippi state line southwest of Gillsburg. The roadway crosses into Amite County and continues as Mississippi Highway 568 (MS 568) toward Magnolia, Mississippi.

=== Route classification and data ===
LA 43 is classified by the Louisiana Department of Transportation and Development (La DOTD) as an urban collector from its southern terminus through Albany and as a rural major collector otherwise. Daily traffic volume in 2013 peaked at 12,300 vehicles in Albany with the remainder of the route averaging less than half that number. The lowest figures were reported near the Mississippi state line with an average of 640 vehicles daily. The posted speed limit is generally 55 mph (90 km/h) in rural areas, reduced to 35 mph (55 km/h) through town. LA 43 is an undivided two-lane highway for its entire length.

== History ==
In the original Louisiana Highway system in use between 1921 and 1955, the majority of LA 43 was part of State Route 46. Route 46 also encompassed the modern LA 429 from Dutchtown to St. Amant; LA 431 from St. Amant to Port Vincent; and LA 42 from Port Vincent to Springfield. Between Greensburg and the Mississippi state line, what is now LA 43 was formerly an extension of State Route 37, which kept its number in the 1955 Louisiana Highway renumbering but gave up this portion of the route.

La 43—From a junction with La 42 near Springfield through or near Albany, Georgeville, Montpelier, Greensburg and Liverpool to the Mississippi State Line.

— 1955 legislative route description

LA 43 was created in the 1955 renumbering, giving a dedicated route number to the north–south corridor in Livingston and St. Helena parishes west of US 51. The route has remained virtually unchanged to the present day.

== Major intersections ==
Parish	Location	mi	km	Destinations	Notes
Livingston		0.000	0.000	LA 42 – Springfield, Port Vincent	Southern terminus; to Tickfaw State Park
Livingston	Hungarian Settlement	2.798– 3.240	4.503– 5.214	I-12 – Hammond, Baton Rouge	Exit 32 on I-12
Livingston		3.285	5.287	LA 1040 east (Old Baton Rouge Highway)	Western terminus of LA 1040
Livingston	Albany	4.867	7.833	US 190 (Florida Boulevard) – Hammond, Livingston	
Livingston		7.658	12.324	LA 1064 east	Western terminus of LA 1064
Livingston		9.796	15.765	LA 442	
Livingston		14.927	24.023	LA 40 east – Independence	Western terminus of LA 40
St. Helena		18.656	30.024	LA 16 east – Amite City LA 441 north	South end of LA 16/LA 441 concurrency
St. Helena	Montpelier	20.071– 20.241	32.301– 32.575	Bridge over Tickfaw River	
St. Helena	Montpelier	20.576	33.114	LA 16 west / LA 441 south (4th Street) – Watson	North end of LA 16/LA 441 concurrency
St. Helena		26.493	42.636	LA 1045 east	Western terminus of LA 1045
St. Helena	Greensburg	31.419	50.564	LA 10 east (North Main Street) – Fluker	South end of LA 10 concurrency
St. Helena	Greensburg	31.479	50.661	LA 10 west (North Main Street) – Clinton	North end of LA 10 concurrency
St. Helena	Liverpool	37.579	60.478	LA 1043 south	Northern terminus of LA 1043
St. Helena	Easleyville	38.623	62.158	LA 38 – Chipola, Kentwood	
St. Helena		44.380	71.423	MS 568 east – Magnolia	Northern terminus; continuation in Mississippi
St. Helena	1.000 mi = 1.609 km; 1.000 km = 0.621 mi: Concurrency terminus				
