= National Register of Historic Places listings in St. Helena Parish, Louisiana =

Location of St. Helena Parish in Louisiana

This is a list of the National Register of Historic Places listings in St. Helena Parish, Louisiana.

This is intended to be a complete list of the properties on the National Register of Historic Places in St. Helena Parish, Louisiana, United States. The locations of National Register properties for which the latitude and longitude coordinates are included below, may be seen in a map.

There are 3 properties listed on the National Register in the parish.

This National Park Service list is complete through NPS recent listings posted November 28, 2025.

== Current listings ==
	Name on the Register	Image	Date listed	Location	City or town	Description
1	William Lee and Eudora Courtney Bazoon Farmstead	William Lee and Eudora Courtney Bazoon Farmstead	September 21, 2016 (#16000673)	George Wright Ln. 30°51′41″N 90°48′12″W	Darlington vicinity	
2	Greensburg Land Office	Greensburg Land Office	October 7, 1980 (#80004249)	Courthouse Sq. 30°49′44″N 90°40′01″W	Greensburg	
3	Old St. Helena Parish Jail	Old St. Helena Parish Jail	October 7, 1980 (#80004478)	Off Louisiana Highway 10; 30°49′44″N 90°40′01″W	Greensburg	

== See also ==
- List of National Historic Landmarks in Louisiana
- National Register of Historic Places listings in Louisiana
