= Blanks, Louisiana =

Unincorporated community in Louisiana

Blanks, Louisiana Blanks
- Unincorporated community
- Location of Blanks in Louisiana
- Coordinates: 30°33′12″N 91°36′01″W
- Country: United States
- State: Louisiana
- Time zone: UTC-6 (CST)
  - Summer (DST): UTC-5 (CDT)
- Area code: 225
- GNIS feature ID: 542998

Blanks is the name of an unincorporated community located in southwestern Pointe Coupee Parish, Louisiana, United States.

The community is said to have been named after Handsell B. Blanks. Blanks was part owner of the Bomer-Blanks Lumber Company that once operated in the area. A post office was established in the community in 1913, but has since been shut down and merged with the post office in the neighboring town of Lottie.

== Geography ==
The community is west of Livonia near the intersections of Louisiana Highway 976 with US 190 and Louisiana Highway 81. The town of Lottie, is located to the west, and Fordoche is to the north.
