= Louisiana Highway 37 =

State highway in Louisiana, United States

Louisiana Highway 37

Route information
- Maintained by Louisiana DOTD
- Length: 42.7 mi (68.7 km)
- Existed: 1955 renumbering–present

Major junctions
- South end: Wooddale Boulevard in Baton Rouge
- US 61 / US 190 in Baton Rouge; LA 64 in Central; LA 63 in Grangeville
- North end: LA 10 in Greensburg

Location
- Country: United States
- State: Louisiana
- Parishes: East Baton Rouge, East Feliciana, St. Helena

Highway system
- Louisiana State Highway System; Interstate; US; State; Scenic
← LA 36	→ LA 38

Louisiana Highway 37 (LA 37) is a 42.7-mile-long (68.7 km) north-south state highway in Louisiana, United States, extending from Wooddale Boulevard in Baton Rouge to Louisiana Highway 10 in Greensburg. In East Baton Rouge Parish, the highway is named Greenwell Springs Road.

== Route description ==
From the southwest, LA 37 begins just west of a cloverleaf interchange with US 61/US 190 in the city of Baton Rouge. The highway heads northeast along Greenwell Springs Road and, about a mile after exiting the city limits, curves northward. Now running parallel with the Amite River, LA 37 begins a concurrency with LA 64 that lasts through much of Central, a newer city that encompasses smaller communities such as Greenwell Springs. North of Central, LA 37 follows the west bank of the Amite River until sharing a bridge across the river with LA 63. After a short distance, LA 37 leaves the river's path and heads northeast through rural St. Helena Parish to its terminus at LA 10 in Greensburg.

== Major junctions ==
Parish	Location	mi	km	Destinations	Notes
East Baton Rouge	Baton Rouge	0.0	0.0	Greenwell Springs Road / Wooddale Boulevard	
East Baton Rouge	Baton Rouge	0.1– 0.4	0.16– 0.64	US 61 / US 190 (Airline Highway) – Natchez, MS, Opelousas	Interchange
East Baton Rouge	Baton Rouge	1.7	2.7	LA 946 north (Joor Road) / Oak Villa Boulevard	Southern terminus of LA 946
East Baton Rouge	Central	9.2	14.8	LA 64 east (Magnolia Bridge Road) / LA 3034 west	Southern end of LA 64 concurrency; eastern terminus of LA 3034
East Baton Rouge	Central	12.1	19.5	LA 408 west (Hooper Road)	Eastern terminus of LA 408
East Baton Rouge	Central	14.2	22.9	LA 64 west – Pride	Northern end of LA 64 concurrency
East Feliciana		27.4	44.1	LA 63 north – Clinton	Southern end of LA 63 concurrency
St. Helena	Grangeville	28.8	46.3	LA 63 south – Pine Grove, Denham Springs	Northern end of LA 63 concurrency
St. Helena		31.5	50.7	LA 448 north	Southern terminus of LA 448
St. Helena		38.9	62.6	LA 449 south – Pine Grove, Denham Springs	Northern terminus of LA 449
St. Helena	Greensburg	42.6	68.6	LA 1042 (South Main Street)	
St. Helena	Greensburg	42.7	68.7	LA 10	
1.000 mi = 1.609 km; 1.000 km = 0.621 mi: Concurrency terminus
