= Louisiana Highway 64 =

State highway in Louisiana, United States

Louisiana Highway 64

- Route of LA 64 highlighted in red

Route information
- Maintained by Louisiana DOTD
- Length: 20.446 mi (32.905 km)
- Existed: 1955 renumbering–present

Major junctions
- West end: LA 964 in Zachary
- LA 19 in Zachary; LA 67 in Zachary; LA 37 in Central
- East end: LA 16 / LA 1026 north of Denham Springs

Location
- Country: United States
- State: Louisiana
- Parishes: East Baton Rouge, Livingston

Highway system
- Louisiana State Highway System; Interstate; US; State; Scenic
← LA 63	→ US 65

Louisiana Highway 64 (LA 64) is a state highway located in southeastern Louisiana. It runs 20.45 miles (32.91 km) in a general east–west direction from LA 964 in Zachary to the junction of LA 16 and LA 1026 north of Denham Springs.

The highway traverses the northern portion of East Baton Rouge Parish and connects Zachary and Central, two suburban cities located outside of Baton Rouge. LA 64 also provides the only highway crossing of the Amite River between Grangeville, 16 miles (26 km) to the north, and Denham Springs, five miles (8.0 km) to the south. LA 64 reaches the bridge by way of a five-mile (8.0 km) concurrency with LA 37 through Greenwell Springs, a rural community now within the city limits of Central. LA 64 continues into Livingston Parish to connect with LA 16 between Denham Springs and Watson.

LA 64 was created in the 1955 Louisiana Highway renumbering from portions of several former state routes. Much of the route is proposed to be turned over to local control as part of the Louisiana Department of Transportation and Development (La DOTD) road transfer program. In 2015, a section of LA 64 near its western terminus was relinquished, causing a gap in state maintenance that led to the creation of LA 64-1. As of 2018, the section of LA 64 west of LA 67 and LA 64-1 are under agreement to be removed from the state highway system and transferred to local control.

== Route description ==
=== Zachary to Central ===
From the west, LA 64 begins at the intersection of LA 964 (Old Scenic Highway) and Mt. Pleasant–Zachary Road, both of which lead to US 61 and the city of Baton Rouge. LA 64 heads east through the East Baton Rouge Parish city of Zachary on Church Street, a divided four-lane thoroughfare, and passes several residential subdivisions. Just before the highway passes the local high school, the median is discontinued as the roadway narrows. LA 64 becomes a commercial corridor as the route curves southeast onto High Street then east again across the Canadian National Railway (CN) line onto Main Street.

In the center of Zachary, LA 64 intersects LA 19, connecting with Slaughter to the north and Baker to the south. After passing Lane Regional Medical Center, the median reappears, and the highway proceeds through the less developed east side of town. Here, LA 64 intersects LA 67 (Plank Road) in an area known as Fred, connecting with Baton Rouge to the south and Clinton to the north.

=== Central to Livingston Parish ===
Narrowing to an undivided two-lane highway, LA 64 bends to the southeast and crosses the Comite River into the city of Central, an incorporated collection of rural communities and residential subdivisions. The first community is known as Deerford and is located around the junction of LA 64 and LA 410 (Blackwater Road). The highway maintains a southeastern trajectory for the next 5.2 miles (8.4 km) to a T-intersection with LA 409 (Liberty Road) at Indian Mound. LA 64 turns south to a second T-intersection with LA 37 (Greenwell Springs Road), and the two highways proceed southward concurrently through the community of Greenwell Springs, still within the city of Central.

Passing the local post office, LA 37-64 intersects LA 408 (Hooper Road), the area's main connection to Baton Rouge Metropolitan Airport. Running parallel to the Amite River, the route continues southward for another 2.9 miles (4.7 km) to LA 3034 (Magnolia Bridge Road) in Magnolia. Here, LA 64 turns east while LA 37 continues ahead on Greenwell Springs Road toward Baton Rouge. LA 64 proceeds as an undivided four-lane highway across the Amite River via the Magnolia Bridge, simultaneously crossing out of East Baton Rouge Parish and the city of Central and into unincorporated Livingston Parish.

In Livingston Parish, LA 64 narrows again to two lanes and passes the community of Plainview, located along LA 1019. LA 64 reaches its eastern terminus at a junction with LA 16 between Denham Springs and Watson. The highway continues across LA 16 as LA 1026 (Lockhart Road) toward the small city of Walker.

=== Route classification and data ===
LA 64 is classified by the Louisiana Department of Transportation and Development (La DOTD) as an urban minor arterial within Central and as an urban principal arterial otherwise. Daily traffic volume in 2013 peaked at 25,800 vehicles in Zachary and 20,100 in Livingston Parish. The lowest figure reported was 4,800 vehicles over the LA 37 concurrency in Central. The posted speed limit is generally 45 mph (70 km/h), reduced to 35 mph (55 km/h) through Zachary. However, the more rural areas allow a speed limit of 55 mph (90 km/h)

== History ==
=== Pre-1955 route numbering ===
In the original Louisiana Highway system in use between 1921 and 1955, the modern LA 64 was part of several different routes, as follows: State Route 272 from the western terminus to Fred; State Route 884 to Deerford; State Route 276 to Indian Mound; State Route 37 to Magnolia; State Route C-1766 across the Amite River; and State Route 334 in Livingston Parish. (Route 37 was one of the few pre-1955 state routes that retained the same number after the 1955 Louisiana Highway renumbering.) The entire above route was graveled by 1930. Paving began at the west end of the route and was completed through Zachary to Fred in 1937. The paving project smoothed out some sharp bends in the roadway on the east side of Zachary. The portion of the route between Indian Mound and Magnolia was paved in 1940 as part of an improvement project along State Route 37. Paving resumed eastward from Fred a decade later and was completed past Deerford by 1953 and to Indian Mound shortly after the 1955 renumbering. The remaining gravel portion of the route east of Magnolia was also hard surfaced around 1956.

=== Post-1955 route history ===
LA 64 was designated in the 1955 renumbering, creating a continuous route from what was then US 61 (now LA 964) west of Zachary and across the Amite River into Livingston Parish. Shortly after the 1955 renumbering, the route was extended west a short distance to Samuels Road, a gravel portion of LA 68 that would become the current alignment of US 61, bypassing the Old Scenic Highway alignment once improvements were completed in 1961. This extension, a gravel road itself until the mid-1960s, ran parallel to the Port Hudson–Plains Road, which was originally designated as part of LA 64. It connected with the remainder of the route by way of a concurrency with former US 61, as described in the official route description. After LA 64 was re-routed, the Port Hudson–Plains Road remained in the state highway system as LA 3004 until it was ultimately returned to local control.

Class "A": La 64—From a junction with La-US 61 near Zachary through or near Zachary, Fred, Indian Mound and Magnolia to a junction with La 16 near Denham Springs. Class "B": La 64—From a junction with La 68 at or near Port Hudson through or near Old Port Hudson to a junction with La-US 61 west of Zachary.

— 1955 legislative route description

With the 1955 renumbering, the state highway department initially categorized all routes into three classes: "A" (primary), "B" (secondary), and "C" (farm-to-market). This system has since been updated and replaced by a more specific functional classification system.

Small realignments have occurred on LA 64 over the years, mostly from the construction of new bridges along the route. The Magnolia Bridge Road was realigned and straightened when a new bridge across the Amite River was built in 1955. (This bridge has since been replaced by a new four-lane span.) A curve at Indian Mound was smoothed out when a new bridge was constructed on LA 37 across nearby Sandy Creek in 1957. The bypassed curve is now a local road known as Old Greenwell Springs Road. In 1978, a zigzag east of Zachary was eliminated with the opening of a new bridge across the Comite River. (Jodie Road and Tucker Road are remnants of the original alignment here.) Around this same time, the portion of LA 64 running through Zachary was widened to four lanes, increasing the traffic capacity through this growing suburb.

In 2015, LA 64 was shortened on its west end when 1.4 miles (2.3 km) of the route west of LA 964 was returned to local control, leaving a section of road adjacent to US 61 disconnected in terms of state maintenance. This portion of former LA 64, 2.0 miles (3.2 km) in length, was renumbered as LA 64-1.

== Future ==
La DOTD is currently engaged in a program that aims to transfer about 5,000 miles (8,000 km) of state-owned roadways to local governments over the next several years. Under this plan of "right-sizing" the state highway system, the entire route of LA 64 west of Indian Mound and the LA 37 concurrency is proposed for deletion as it does not meet a significant interurban travel function.

== Major intersections ==
Parish	Location	mi	km	Destinations	Notes
East Baton Rouge	Zachary	0.000	0.000	LA 964 (Old Scenic Highway)	Western terminus
East Baton Rouge	Zachary	2.625	4.225	LA 19 – Baker, Slaughter	
East Baton Rouge	Zachary	5.365	8.634	LA 67 (Plank Road) – Baton Rouge, Clinton	Location also known as Fred
East Baton Rouge	Zachary–Central line	6.163– 6.245	9.918– 10.050	Bridge over Comite River	
East Baton Rouge	Central	7.725	12.432	LA 410 (Blackwater Road)	Northern terminus of LA 410; location also known as Deerford
East Baton Rouge	Central	12.914	20.783	LA 409 (Liberty Road) – Pride	Southern terminus of LA 409
East Baton Rouge	Central	13.208	21.256	LA 37 north (Greenwell Springs Road) – Baywood	West end of LA 37 concurrency; location also known as Indian Mound
East Baton Rouge	Central	15.369	24.734	LA 408 (Hooper Road)	Eastern terminus of LA 408; location also known as Greenwell Springs
East Baton Rouge	Central	18.278	29.416	LA 37 south (Greenwell Springs Road) – Baton Rouge; LA 3034 (Magnolia Bridge Road)	East end of LA 37 concurrency; eastern terminus of LA 3034; location also known as Magnolia
Amite River		18.518– 18.864	29.802– 30.359	Magnolia Bridge	
Livingston	Plainview	19.325	31.101	LA 1019 north	Southern terminus of LA 1019
Livingston		20.004	32.193	LA 1028 east (Old River Road)	Western terminus of LA 1028
Livingston		20.437– 20.446	32.890– 32.905	LA 16 – Denham Springs, Watson LA 1026 east (Lockhart Road) – Walker	Eastern terminus of LA 64; western terminus of LA 1026
1.000 mi = 1.609 km; 1.000 km = 0.621 mi: Concurrency terminus

== Auxiliary route ==
Louisiana Highway 64-1
- Location: East Baton Rouge Parish
- Length: 1.983 mi (3.191 km)
- Existed: 2015–present

Louisiana Highway 64-1 (LA 64-1) runs 1.98 miles (3.19 km) in an east–west direction between US 61 and a local road west of Zachary. It was part of LA 64 until a portion of the Mt. Pleasant–Zachary Road was returned to local control in 2015, leaving a gap in state maintenance.

From the west, LA 64-1 begins at a point on US 61 (Samuels Road) between Baton Rouge and Port Hudson. It heads east along Mt. Pleasant–Zachary Road as an undivided two-lane highway for two miles (3.2 km) to an intersection with Barnett Road. Mt. Pleasant–Zachary Road continues as a local road into the city of Zachary. State maintenance resumes at LA 964 (Old Scenic Highway), the western terminus of LA 64.

LA 64-1 is classified as an urban principal arterial by the Louisiana Department of Transportation and Development (La DOTD). The average daily traffic volume on this roadway was reported as 7,500 vehicles in 2013. The posted speed limit is 55 mph (90 km/h). LA 64-1 is proposed for return to local control as part of the La DOTD's ongoing road transfer program.

Major intersections
The entire route is in East Baton Rouge Parish.

mi	km	Destinations	Notes
0.000	0.000	US 61 (Samuels Road) – Baton Rouge, Natchez	Western terminus
1.983	3.191	Barnett Road	Eastern terminus
1.000 mi = 1.609 km; 1.000 km = 0.621 mi
