= Old St. Helena Parish Jail =

- U.S. National Register of Historic Places
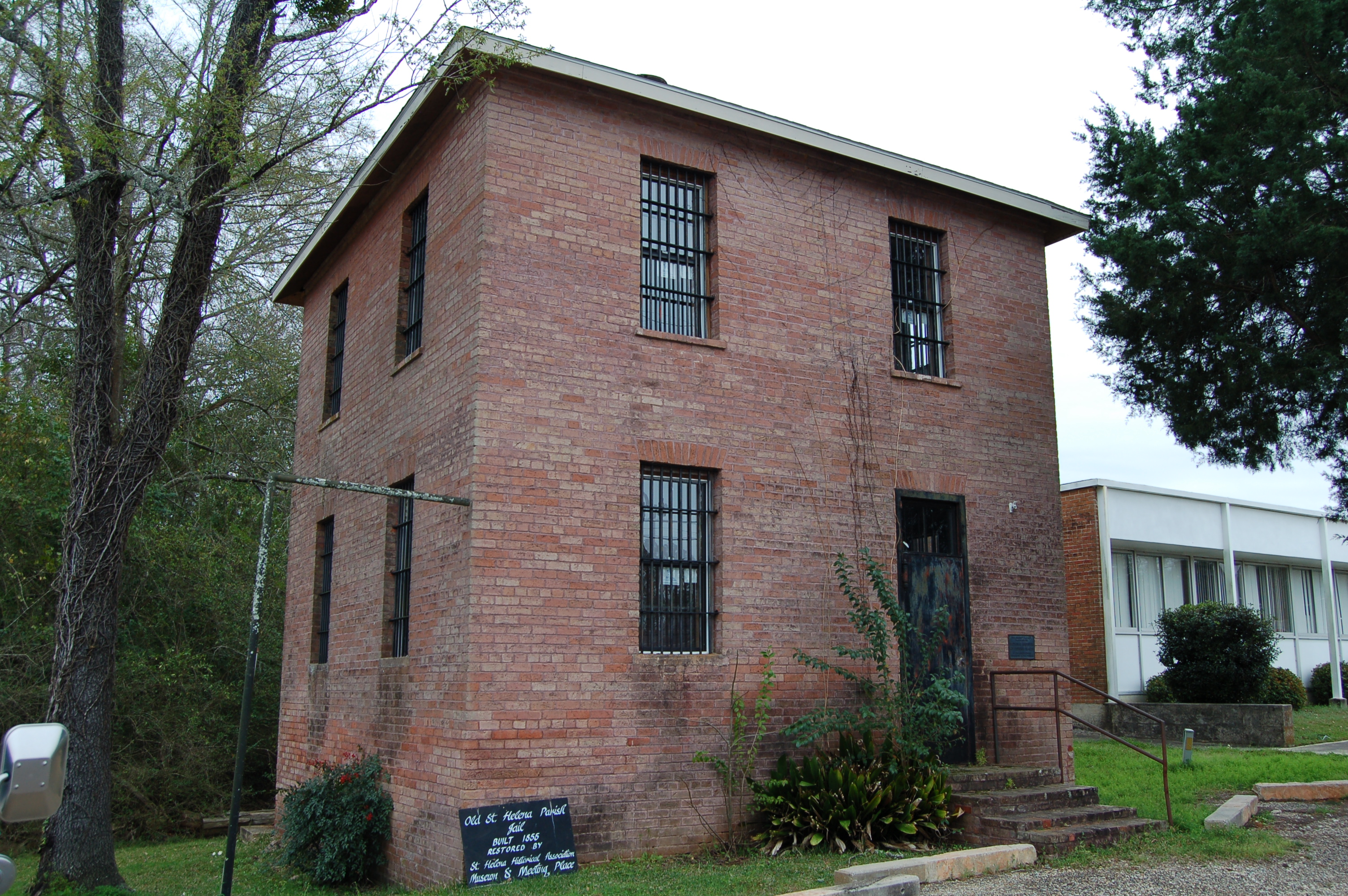

- Location within Louisiana Location within the United States
- Location: Off LA 10, Greensburg, Louisiana
- Coordinates: 30°49′44″N 90°40′1″W
- Area: 0.1 acres (0.040 ha)
- Built: 1855
- NRHP reference No.: 80004478
- Added to NRHP: October 7, 1980

The Old St. Helena Parish Jail, adjacent to the courthouse square in Greensburg in St. Helena Parish, Louisiana, was built in about 1855 and is one of the oldest structures in the parish. It was listed on the National Register of Historic Places in 1980.

It is a two-story brick building with remains of cells, including bars in windows. It was deemed significant "as a good example of a mid-nineteenth century jail building". In 1980 it was thought there probably were fewer than five such examples in Louisiana.

== See also ==
- Beauregard Parish Jail: NRHP-listed in DeRidder, Louisiana
- National Register of Historic Places listings in St. Helena Parish, Louisiana
