= Senator Jumonville =

Senator Jumonville may refer to:

- J. E. Jumonville Jr. (born 1942), Louisiana State Senate
- J. E. Jumonville Sr. (1919–1983), Louisiana State Senate
