= Louisiana Highway 81 =

State highway in Louisiana, United States

Louisiana Highway 81

Route information
- Maintained by Louisiana DOTD
- Length: 8.82 mi (14.19 km)
- Existed: 1955 renumbering–present

Major junctions
- South end: LA 77 in Livonia
- US 190 in Lottie
- North end: LA 77 in Fordoche

Location
- Country: United States
- State: Louisiana
- Parishes: Pointe Coupee

Highway system
- Louisiana State Highway System; Interstate; US; State; Scenic
← US 80	→ LA 82
← SR C-1942	SR C-1943	→ SR C-1944

Louisiana Highway 81 (LA 81) is a state highway located in Pointe Coupee Parish, Louisiana. It runs 8.82 miles (14.19 km) in a generally north–south direction from LA 77 in Livonia to a second junction with LA 77 in Fordoche.

The route is L-shaped, essentially forming a loop off of LA 77. It parallels U.S. Highway 190 (US 190) from Livonia west to Lottie. It then turns north, immediately crossing US 190, and heads toward Fordoche. LA 81 is classified as a north–south route by the Louisiana Department of Transportation and Development (La DOTD), but its signage does not carry directional banners. Established in the 1955 renumbering, the highway was previously part of two separate state highways, including a section of State Route 7.

== Route description ==
From the southeast, LA 81 begins at an intersection with LA 77 in Livonia. LA 77 heads southeast toward Maringouin, eventually reaching I-10, and connects to US 190 immediately to the north. LA 81 proceeds westward out of Livonia, running parallel to US 190, and crosses the Union Pacific Railroad (UP) tracks at grade. 1.5 miles (2.4 km) later, LA 81 passes through an area known as Blanks and intersects LA 976, a short connector to US 190.

Continuing west for 2.1 miles (3.4 km), LA 81 curves to the north briefly and enters the small community of Lottie. It then curves back to the west and becomes known as Old State Highway. LA 81 turns north opposite the Lottie post office and proceeds a short distance across a second grade crossing with the UPRR to an intersection with US 190 (Airline Highway). US 190 connects to Baton Rouge on the east and Opelousas on the west.

LA 81 proceeds north across US 190 and away from Lottie. Now known as Charles Road, LA 81 begins to take a more winding route, closely following the remains of Bayou White. 2.7 miles (4.3 km) later, LA 81 curves to the east and enters the northwest corner of Fordoche. It ends shortly afterward at a second intersection with LA 77, the main highway through town. To the north, LA 77 connects with LA 10 to Morganza.

The route is classified as a rural local road by the Louisiana Department of Transportation and Development (La DOTD). Average daily traffic volume in 2013 is reported as 410 vehicles between Livonia and Lottie, increasing to 1,060 between Lottie and Fordoche. The posted speed limit is 45 mph (70 km/h) in Livonia, 40 mph (65 km/h) in Lottie and Fordoche, generally increasing to 55 mph (90 km/h) between points. LA 81 is an undivided, two-lane highway for its entire length.

== History ==
=== Pre-1955 route numbering ===
In the original Louisiana Highway system in use between 1921 and 1955, the modern LA 81 was part of two separate state highways.

==== Southern section ====
The southern section running from Livonia west to Lottie was a small part of State Route 7, which was designated in 1921 by an act of the state legislature. Route 7 was originally an important cross-state route known as the Evangeline Highway and generally followed the modern US 190 corridor. The section that is now LA 81 served as part of the main highway between Baton Rouge and Opelousas until it was bypassed by the Airline Highway in 1933. Two years later, the new route became part of US 190, which was extended west into Texas from its original terminus at the Mississippi River in Baton Rouge. Most of the old road running west from Lottie to the Atchafalaya River opposite Krotz Springs was abandoned shortly afterward. As was often the case during this era, the state highway department did not move the Route 7 designation onto the new highway. As a result, Route 7 became discontinuous and served as little more than a local road in the area until the 1955 Louisiana Highway renumbering.

==== Northern section ====
State Route C-1943
- Location: Pointe Coupee Parish
- Length: 4.6 mi (7.4 km)
- Existed: 1940s–1955

The remaining section of the current LA 81, running northward from Lottie to Fordoche, was designated as State Route C-1943 prior to the 1955 renumbering. It was created in the 1940s and, like all routes added after 1930, it was numbered by the state highway department rather than by the state legislature and carried a "C-" prefix.

The entire highway was in Pointe Coupee Parish.

Location	mi	km	Destinations	Notes
Lottie	0.0	0.0	US 190 / SR C-1500 (Airline Highway) – Baton Rouge, Opelousas	Southern terminus
Fordoche	3.4	5.5	SR 1 – Baton Rouge, Alexandria	Northern terminus
1.000 mi = 1.609 km; 1.000 km = 0.621 mi

=== Post-1955 route history ===
LA 81 was created in 1955 as a collective renumbering of the surviving portion of former State Route 7 between Lottie and Livonia as well the entirety of former State Route C-1943.

Class "B": La 81—From a junction with La-US 190 at or near Lottie to a junction with La 77 near Fordoche.
Class "C": La 81—From a junction with La 77 at or near Livonia to a junction with La-US 190 at or near Lottie.

— 1955 legislative route description

With the 1955 renumbering, the state highway department initially categorized all routes into three classes: "A" (primary), "B" (secondary), and "C" (farm-to-market). The northern section of LA 81 was categorized as Class "B" and the southern section as Class "C." This system has since been updated and replaced by a more specific functional classification system that now designates the entire route as a rural local road. However, the route of LA 81 has remained the same to the present day.

== Future ==
La DOTD is currently engaged in a program that aims to transfer about 5,000 miles (8,000 km) of state-owned roadways to local governments over the next several years. Under this plan of "right-sizing" the state highway system, the entire route of LA 81 is proposed for deletion as it does not meet a significant interurban travel function.

== Major intersections ==
The entire highway is in Pointe Coupee Parish.

Location	mi	km	Destinations	Notes
Livonia	0.0	0.0	LA 77 (Maringouin Road West) – Maringouin, Fordoche	Southern terminus
Blanks	2.4	3.9	LA 976	Southern terminus of LA 976
Lottie	5.5	8.9	US 190 (Airline Highway) – Baton Rouge, Opelousas	
Fordoche	8.8	14.2	LA 77 (Fordoche Road)	Northern terminus
1.000 mi = 1.609 km; 1.000 km = 0.621 mi
