= Jumonville =

Jumonville may refer to:

== People ==
- George Jumonville (1917–1996), American baseball player
- J. E. Jumonville Jr. (born 1942), American politician and horse breeder in Louisiana
- J. E. Jumonville Sr. (1919–1983), American politician in Louisiana
- Jerry Jumonville (1941–2019), American musician
- Joseph Coulon de Jumonville (1718–1754), French Canadian military officer

== Other uses ==
- Battle of Jumonville Glen, the opening battle of the French and Indian War, fought in Pennsylvania on May 28, 1754
- Jumonville (Pennsylvania), a camp and retreat center located in Fayette County, Pennsylvania, U.S.
