= Weiss, Louisiana =

Unincorporated community in Louisiana

- Unincorporated community
- Location within Louisiana Location within the United States
- Coordinates: 30°38′50″N 90°54′20″W
- Country: United States
- State: Louisiana
- Parish: Livingston
- Elevation: 89 ft (27 m)
- Time zone: UTC-6 (Central (CST))
  - Summer (DST): UTC-5 (CDT)
- ZIP code: 70706
- Area code: 225
- GNIS feature ID: 541210
- FIPS code: 22-80325

Weiss is an unincorporated community in Livingston Parish, Louisiana, United States. The community is located less than 3 miles (4.8 kilometres) southwest of Baywood and 6 miles (9.7 kilometres) northeast of Watson near the Amite River.

== History ==
In 1894 a local man named Fred Nesom and his father Henry Nesom began organizing the community and sought the help of a German man named Fred Weiss who was the postmaster in the nearby community of Fred, Louisiana. Fred Weiss submitted the paperwork and proposed the name Weiss and it was accepted. The post office was closed sometime in April 1949.
