= Maringouin, Louisiana =

- Town
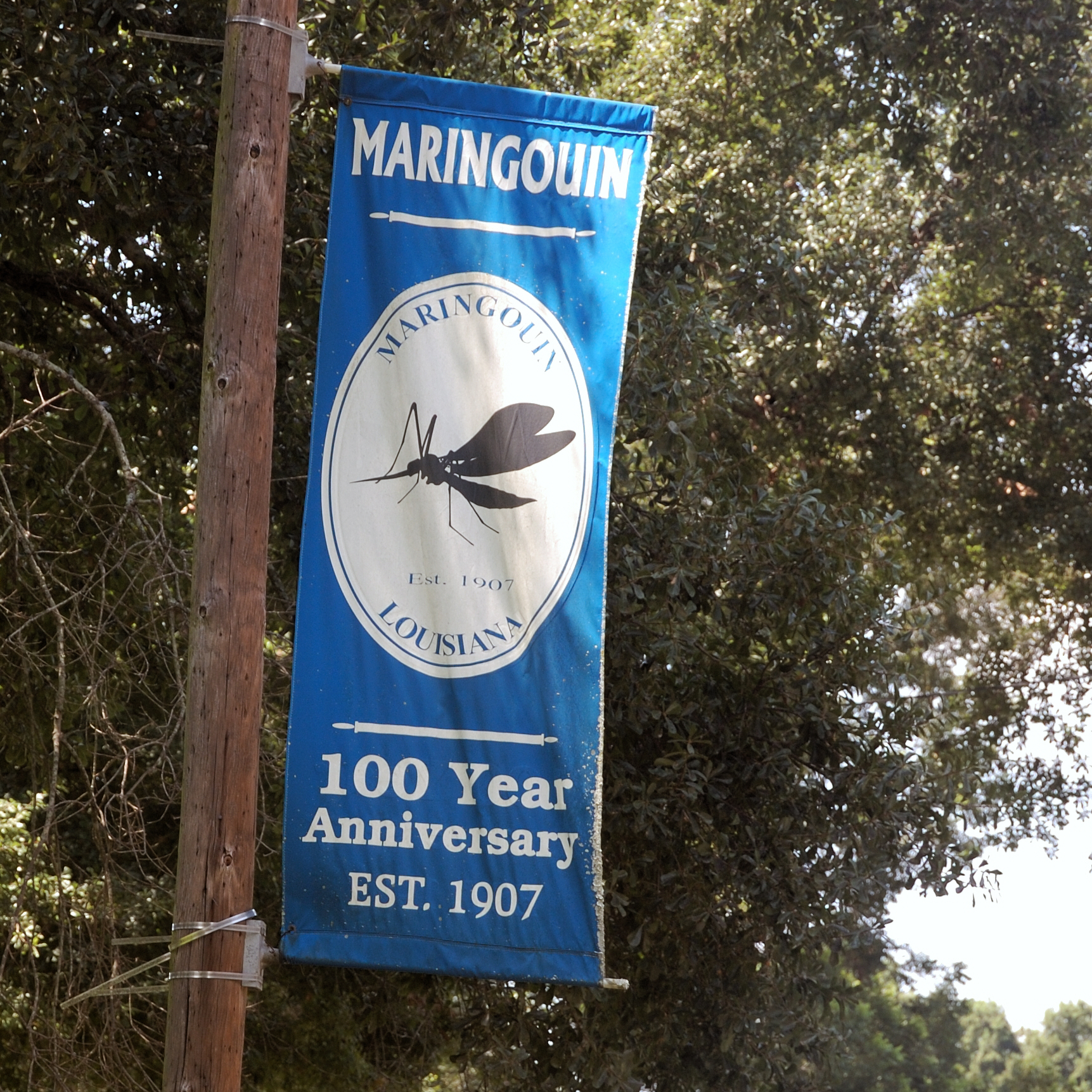
- Centennial banner

- Location of Maringouin in Iberville Parish, Louisiana

- Location of Louisiana in the United States
- Coordinates: 30°29′27″N 91°31′07″W
- Country: United States
- State: Louisiana
- Parish: Iberville

Government
  - Mayor: Maurice Harris (D)

Area
  - Total: 0.74 sq mi (1.91 km^{2})
  - Land: 0.74 sq mi (1.91 km^{2})
  - Water: 0 sq mi (0.00 km^{2})
- Elevation: 23 ft (7.0 m)

Population (2020)
  - Total: 891
  - Density: 1,207.0/sq mi (466.01/km^{2})
- Time zone: UTC-6 (CST)
  - Summer (DST): UTC-5 (CDT)
- Area code: 225
- FIPS code: 22-48610
- GNIS feature ID: 2406099
- Website: www.townofmaringouin.net

Maringouin is a town in Iberville Parish, Louisiana, United States. The population was 1,098 at the 2010 census, down from 1,262 at the 2000 census. At the 2020 population estimates program, its population was 966. It is part of the Baton Rouge metropolitan statistical area.

== Etymology ==
The name, which is Louisiana Creole in origin and means "mosquito", is pronounced mah-ring-gwin.

== Geography ==
Maringouin is located in northern Iberville Parish. Its northern border is the Pointe Coupee Parish line, and its eastern border is Bayou Grosse Tete. Louisiana Highway 77 passes through the center of the town, leading north 5 miles (8 km) to Livonia and southeast 6 miles (10 km) along Bayou Grosse Tete to Rosedale. Louisiana Highway 76 leads south from Maringouin 7 miles (11 km) along Bayou Maringuoin to Interstate 10 at Ramah.

According to the United States Census Bureau, Maringuoin has a total area of 0.73 square miles (1.9 km^{2}), all of it recorded as land. The town is part of the French speaking Acadiana region of Louisiana.

== Demographics ==
Historical population
| Census | Pop. | Note | %± |
|---|---|---|---|
| 1910 | 447 | | — |
| 1920 | 399 | | −10.7% |
| 1930 | 518 | | 29.8% |
| 1940 | 708 | | 36.7% |
| 1950 | 898 | | 26.8% |
| 1960 | 1,168 | | 30.1% |
| 1970 | 1,365 | | 16.9% |
| 1980 | 1,291 | | −5.4% |
| 1990 | 1,149 | | −11.0% |
| 2000 | 1,262 | | 9.8% |
| 2010 | 1,098 | | −13.0% |
| 2020 | 891 | | −18.9% |
| 2025 (est.) | 810 | ▼ | −9.1% |
U.S. Decennial Census

Maringouin racial composition as of 2020
| Race | Number | Percentage |
|---|---|---|
| White (non-Hispanic) | 105 | 11.78% |
| Black or African American (non-Hispanic) | 770 | 86.42% |
| Native American | 1 | 0.11% |
| Other/Mixed | 10 | 1.12% |
| Hispanic or Latino | 5 | 0.56% |

As of the 2020 United States census, there were 891 people, 393 households, and 248 families residing in the town.

At the 2000 United States census, there were 1,262 people, 421 households, and 327 families residing in the town. The population density was 1,691.3 inhabitants per square mile (653.0/km^{2}). There were 458 housing units at an average density of 613.8 per square mile (237.0/km^{2}). The racial makeup of the town was 20.13% White, 79.40% African American, 0.08% from other races, and 0.40% from two or more races. Hispanic or Latino of any race were 0.08% of the population.

There were 421 households, out of which 40.4% had children under the age of 18 living with them, 44.7% were married couples living together, 27.6% had a female householder with no husband present, and 22.1% were non-families. 20.2% of all households were made up of individuals, and 11.6% had someone living alone who was 65 years of age or older. The average household size was 3.00 and the average family size was 3.43.

In the town, the population was spread out, with 33.1% under the age of 18, 9.3% from 18 to 24, 24.3% from 25 to 44, 20.2% from 45 to 64, and 13.1% who were 65 years of age or older. The median age was 32 years. For every 100 females, there were 80.8 males. For every 100 females age 18 and over, there were 73.7 males.

The median income for a household in the town was $23,816, and the median income for a family was $28,359. Males had a median income of $27,917 versus $19,500 for females. The per capita income for the town was $10,817. About 27.5% of families and 31.5% of the population were below the poverty line, including 39.2% of those under age 18 and 22.1% of those age 65 or over.

== Connection to historical slave sale ==
In 1838, the Maryland Province of the Society of Jesus agreed to sell 272 slaves they owned to Southern buyers. Many descendants of these slaves presently live in and around Maringouin. One of the Maryland Jesuits' institutions, Georgetown University, formed a working group to study the sale and ultimately extended to the descendants of the Jesuits' slaves the "same consideration [they] give members of the Georgetown community in the admissions process".

== Notable people ==
- Rick Ward III, state senator from District 17 since 2012
