= Louisiana Highway 77 =

State highway in Louisiana, United States

Louisiana Highway 77

Route information
- Maintained by Louisiana DOTD
- Length: 49.2 mi (79.2 km)
- Existed: 1955 renumbering–present

Major junctions
- South end: LA 1 in Plaquemine
- I-10 in Grosse Tete; US 190 in Livonia
- North end: LA 10 north of Fordoche

Location
- Country: United States
- State: Louisiana
- Parishes: Iberville, Pointe Coupee

Highway system
- Louisiana State Highway System; Interstate; US; State; Scenic
← LA 76	→ LA 78

Louisiana Highway 77 (LA 77) is a state highway in Louisiana that serves Iberville and Pointe Coupee parishes. It spans 49.2 miles (79.2 km).

== Route description ==
LA 77 begins at LA 1 near The Island Country Club in Plaquemine and runs parallel with Bayou Jacob as it heads west. Leaving Plaquemine, the highway then runs parallel with LA 3066 and Bayou Plaquemine heading through Crescent. Meeting Port Allen Lock, it crosses over the Bayou Grosse Tête Draw Bridge before heading north. It then runs parallel with Port Allen Lock and then heads northwest, intersecting with LA 386 before heading into Grosse Tête. The highway then interchanges with I-10 at exit 139 before entering Rosedale and intersecting LA 76. LA 77 then runs parallel with LA 411 heading into Maringouin. It then intersects LA 977 and runs through downtown before meeting LA 76 again before heading north. The highway then enters Valverda and intersects LA 977 before running parallel with LA 411 and Port Allen Lock. It then intersects LA 81 and US 190 before passing through Livonia. The highway then turns to the west and passes through Fordoche and intersects LA 81 again before turning to the north. LA 77 then meets its northern terminus at LA 10 and the road continues north assigned as LA 10.

== Junction list ==
Parish	Location	mi	km	Destinations	Notes
Iberville	Plaquemine	0.0	0.0	LA 1 – Port Allen, Donaldsonville	Southern terminus
Iberville		17.2	27.7	LA 386	
Iberville	Grosse Tete	21.8	35.1	I-10 – Baton Rouge, Lafayette	exit 139 on I-10
Iberville	Rosedale	23.9	38.5	LA 76 – Port Allen	
Iberville	Maringouin	29.8	48.0	LA 977	
Iberville	Maringouin	30.3	48.8	LA 76 – Port Allen	
Pointe Coupee		34.5	55.5	LA 977 – Maringouin	
Pointe Coupee	Livonia	35.3	56.8	LA 81 – Lottie	
Pointe Coupee	Livonia	35.6	57.3	US 190 – Baton Rouge, Opelousas	
Pointe Coupee	Fordoche	42.0	67.6	LA 81 – Lottie, Livonia	
Pointe Coupee		47.5	76.4	LA 77 Spur – Morganza	
Pointe Coupee		49.1	79.0	LA 10 – Krotz Springs	Northern terminus
1.000 mi = 1.609 km; 1.000 km = 0.621 mi

== Spur route ==
Louisiana Highway 77 Spur
- Location: Pointe Coupee Parish
- Length: 1.44 mi (2.32 km)

Louisiana Spur Highway 77 (Spur LA 77) is a 1.4-mile-long (2.3 km) highway that covers a glitch in the state highway system. The current LA 77 follows the routing of the original Jefferson Highway, and the LA 77 alignment follows the old road to meet LA 10 West. However, this shortcut is used to reach Morganza, to the northeast of Livonia.

=== Junction list ===
The entire highway is in Pointe Coupee Parish.

Location	mi	km	Destinations	Notes
	0.0	0.0	LA 77	Western terminus
	1.4	2.3	LA 10 – Melville	Eastern terminus
1.000 mi = 1.609 km; 1.000 km = 0.621 mi
