= Pine Grove, Louisiana =

Pine Grove may refer to the following places in the U.S. state of Louisiana:

- Pine Grove, Ouachita Parish, Louisiana
- Pine Grove, St. Helena Parish, Louisiana
