= Darlington, Louisiana =

Unincorporated community in Louisiana

- Unincorporated community
- Location within Louisiana Location within the United States
- Coordinates: 30°52′41″N 90°46′53″W
- Country: United States
- State: Louisiana
- Parish: St. Helena Parish
- Elevation: 259 ft (79 m)
- Time zone: UTC-6 (Central (CST))
  - Summer (DST): UTC-5 (CDT)
- ZIP code: 70441
- Area code: 225
- GNIS feature ID: 560584
- FIPS code: 22-19420

Darlington, also known as Pipkins Mills, is an unincorporated community in St. Helena Parish, Louisiana, United States. The community is located 2 miles (3.2 kilometres) east of Coleman Town and 7 miles (11 kilometres) northwest of Greensburg.

== Historic log structures ==
In 1981 the National Register of Historic Places completed a survey of St. Helena Parish and discovered seven log cabins and nineteen barns. After inspecting those sites it was determined that the local William Lee and Eudora Courtney Bazoon Farmstead log structures should be preserved for their historical significance.
