= Rick Ward III =

American politician (born 1982)

Richard Joseph "Rick" Ward III

Member of the Louisiana Senate from the 17th district
- In office January 2012 – June 6, 2022
- Preceded by: Robert M. Marionneaux
- Succeeded by: Caleb Kleinpeter

Personal details
- Born: June 1982 (age 44) Livonia, Louisiana, U.S.
- Party: Republican (2013–present); Democratic (until 2013)
- Spouse: Dawn White Ward
- Children: 3
- Education: Louisiana State University; Southern University Law Center
- Occupation: Lawyer

Richard Joseph Ward III, known as Rick Ward III (born June 1982), is an American attorney and politician from Livonia, Louisiana, who was a Republican member of the Louisiana State Senate, representing district 17 until his resignation in June 2022.

== Background ==
A native of Livonia in Pointe Coupee Parish, Ward attended Bethany Christian School in Baker, Louisiana before attending Louisiana State University and Southern University Law Center, both in Baton Rouge. He and his wife, the former Dawn White, reside in Port Allen in West Baton Rouge Parish with their three children, Reese, Hayes and Hudson. The Ward family attends Bethany World Prayer Center.

== Political career ==
In July 2013, Ward left the Democratic Party and became a Republican. He became the twenty-sixth Republican senator, with thirteen remaining Democrats. Ward's District 17 encompasses all or parts of several parishes, including Assumption, East Baton Rouge, East Feliciana, Iberville, Pointe Coupee, St. Helena, St. Martin, West Baton Rouge, and West Feliciana.

Ward handily won the nonpartisan blanket primary in the fall of 2011 over another Democrat, Larry Thomas, 25,645 (70 percent) to 11,000 (30 percent). He succeeded the term-limited Senator Robert M. Marionneaux, also of Maringouin.

Ward has a 62 percent rating from the interest group, the Louisiana Association of Business and Industry. However, he only scored a 33% in 2013, which ranked him 29th out of 39 state senators. In 2013, he also scored 30 with the Louisiana Legislative Log's conservative index.

== Congressional race abandoned ==
After becoming a Republican, Ward was criticized for switching parties to enhance his chances of winning Louisiana's 6th congressional district seat in 2014. The incumbent, Bill Cassidy, was leaving the United States House of Representatives to challenge U.S. Senator Mary Landrieu. Scott McKay, writer for conservative Louisiana politics blog The Hayride, stated that Ward had voted "to expand Medicaid, push a Lilly Ledbetter Junior bill in the state legislature and oppose term limits for school board hacks, is a pretty dubious proposition.".

However, Ward decided not to seek the U.S. House seat after he determined that a congressional race and service if elected would take too much time from the formative years of his young children.

At the end of the special legislative session in June 2017, Ward introduced a resolution calling upon lawmakers to act in a more civil fashion toward one another, not to let partisanship and political views sour personal relations with colleagues. "There are always a lot of heated discussions, but it seems to me like we're moving away from philosophical disagreements on issues and getting personal," Ward said. State Representative Chris Broadwater, a Republican from Hammond, introduced Ward's resolution in the House, where it passed without opposition. U.S. Representative Mike Johnson of Louisiana's 4th congressional district, who is a former member of the state House of Representatives, expressed a similar view in a document which he wrote as a congressional freshman.

Louisiana State Senate
Preceded by Robert M. Marionneaux	Louisiana State Senator for District 17 (Assumption, East Feliciana, East Baton Rouge, Iberville, Pointe Coupee, St. Helena, St. Martin, West Baton Rouge, and West Feliciana parishes); 2012-2022	Succeeded by Caleb Kleinpeter
