= Nathaniel Williams =

Nathaniel Williams may refer to:

- Nathaniel Williams (writer) (1656/57–c.1679), Welsh writer
- Nathaniel F. Williams (1782–1864), American businessman and politician in Maryland
- Nathaniel Williams (Liberian politician) (died 2016)
- Nat Williams (born 1956), American law-enforcement officer
- Nate Williams (basketball, born 1950), basketball player

== See also ==
- Nate Williams (disambiguation)
