= Grosse Tête, Louisiana =

- Village
- Location of Grosse Tete in Iberville Parish, Louisiana

- Location of Louisiana in the United States
- Coordinates: 30°24′53″N 91°26′22″W
- Country: United States
- State: Louisiana
- Parish: Iberville

Area
  - Total: 1.49 sq mi (3.86 km^{2})
  - Land: 1.47 sq mi (3.80 km^{2})
  - Water: 0.023 sq mi (0.06 km^{2})
- Elevation: 13 ft (4.0 m)

Population (2020)
  - Total: 548
  - Density: 373.5/sq mi (144.19/km^{2})
- Time zone: UTC-6 (CST)
  - Summer (DST): UTC-5 (CDT)
- Area code: 225
- FIPS code: 22-32020
- GNIS feature ID: 2407471
- Website: www.grossetetela.com

Grosse Tête ([ɡʁos tɛt]; locally /ɡroʊs ˈteɪt/) is a village in Iberville Parish, Louisiana, United States. The population was 647 at the 2010 census, and 731 at the 2019 American Community Survey. The village name is French for "Big Head". Grosse Tête is part of the Baton Rouge metropolitan statistical area.

== Geography ==
Grosse Tête is located in northern Iberville Parish and is bordered to the north by the village of Rosedale. Bayou Grosse Tete flows through the eastern side of the village.

Interstate 10 passes through the northern side of the village, with access from Exit 139. I-10 leads east 16 miles (26 km) to Baton Rouge and west 39 miles (63 km) to Lafayette.

Louisiana Highway 77 heads 22 miles (35 km) from Grosse Tete to the city of Plaquemine, the Iberville Parish seat.

According to the United States Census Bureau, the village has a total area of 1.19 square miles (3.07 km^{2}), of which 1.17 square miles (3.03 km^{2}) are land and 0.02 square miles (0.04 km^{2}), or 1.41%, are water.

== Demographics ==
Historical population
Census	Pop.	Note	%±
1930	303		—
1940	382		26.1%
1950	548		43.5%
1960	768		40.1%
1970	710		−7.6%
1980	749		5.5%
1990	541		−27.8%
2000	670		23.8%
2010	647		−3.4%
2020	548		−15.3%
2025 (est.)	527	▼	−3.8%
U.S. Decennial Census

Grosse Tête racial composition as of 2020
Race	Number	Percentage
White (non-Hispanic)	359	65.51%
Black or African American (non-Hispanic)	166	30.29%
Native American	6	1.09%
Asian	3	0.55%
Other/Mixed	9	1.64%
Hispanic or Latino	5	0.91%

As of the 2020 United States census, there were 548 people, 265 households, and 174 families residing in the village. At the 2019 census estimates program, 731 people lived in the village. The racial and ethnic makeup was 54.2% non-Hispanic white, 43.4% Black and African American, and 2.5% multiracial. The median household income was $45,750 and 21.6% of the population lived at or below the poverty line.

At the 2000 U.S. census, there were 670 people, 261 households, and 182 families residing in the village. The population density was 554.4 inhabitants per square mile (214.1/km^{2}). There were 294 housing units at an average density of 243.3 per square mile (93.9/km^{2}). The racial makeup of the village was 55.52% White, 42.84% African American, 0.30% Native American, 0.75% Asian, 0.30% from other races, and 0.30% from two or more races. Hispanic or Latino of any race were 0.45% of the population.

There were 261 households, out of which 31.0% had children under the age of 18 living with them, 46.7% were married couples living together, 19.2% had a female householder with no husband present, and 29.9% were non-families. 23.8% of all households were made up of individuals, and 9.2% had someone living alone who was 65 years of age or older. The average household size was 2.56 and the average family size was 3.06.

In the village, the population was spread out, with 27.3% under the age of 18, 7.2% from 18 to 24, 31.9% from 25 to 44, 19.7% from 45 to 64, and 13.9% who were 65 years of age or older. The median age was 36 years. For every 100 females there were 82.1 males. For every 100 females age 18 and over, there were 82.4 males.

The median income for a household in the village was $27,734, and the median income for a family was $32,188. Males had a median income of $25,417 versus $20,781 for females. The per capita income for the village was $12,840. About 16.7% of families and 23.4% of the population were below the poverty line, including 31.5% of those under age 18 and 27.6% of those age 65 or over.

== Notable people ==
Louisiana State Senator Robert M. Marionneaux resides on a cattle farm in Grosse Tete but practices law in Baton Rouge.
