= Caleb Kleinpeter =

American politician

Member of the Louisiana State Senate from the 17th district
- Incumbent
- Assumed office December 6, 2022
- Preceded by: Rick Ward III

Personal details
- Born: Caleb Seth Kleinpeter Baton Rouge, Louisiana, U.S.
- Party: Republican
- Spouse: Kayne Daigle
- Children: 3

Military service
- Branch/service: United States Marine Corps
- Years of service: 2001–2005

Caleb Seth Kleinpeter is an American politician serving as a member of the Louisiana State Senate for the 17th district. He assumed office on December 6, 2022.

== Early life and education ==
Kleinpeter was born in Baton Rouge, Louisiana, and raised in Grosse Tête and Brusly. He graduated from Brusly High School in 2000.

== Early career ==
In 2001, Kleinpeter enlisted in the United States Marine Corps as a rifleman. Kleinpeter was deployed to Iraq and Afghanistan and was honorably discharged from the United States Marine Corps in 2005. Since 2011, he has worked as a pipeline technician at Enterprise Products.

== Political career ==
Kleinpeter was elected to the Louisiana State Senate in November 2022.
