= Louisiana's 17th State Senate district =

American legislative district

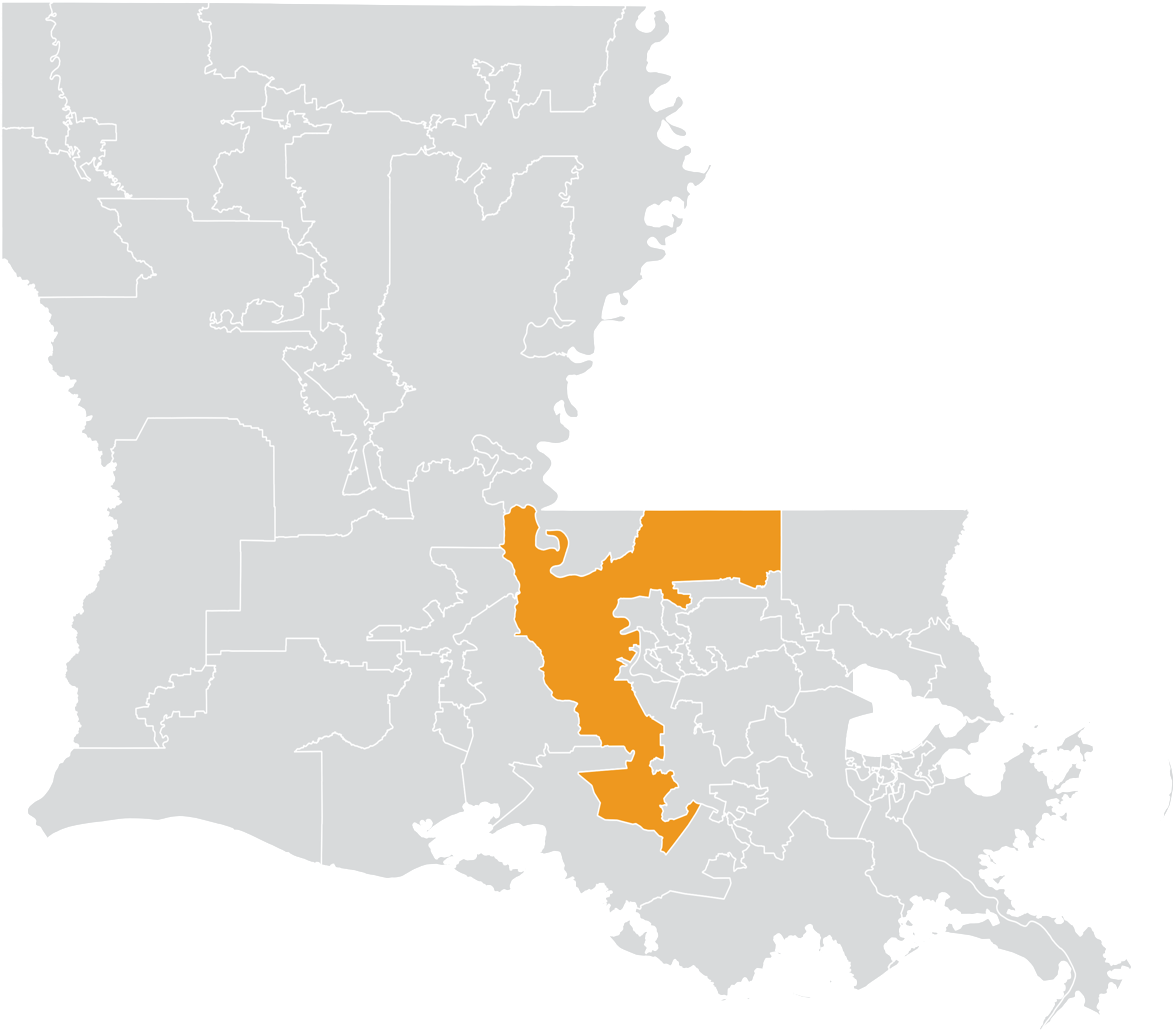
Senator
Caleb Kleinpeter; R–Brusly
- Registration: 52.4% Democratic; 26.1% Republican; 21.5% No party preference
- Demographics: 60% White; 36% Black; 2% Hispanic; 0% Asian; 1% Other
- Population (2019): 108,573
- Registered voters: 77,629

Louisiana's 17th State Senate district is one of 39 districts in the Louisiana State Senate. The district is currently represented by Republican Caleb Kleinpeter. It was previously represented by Democrat-turned-Republican Rick Ward III from 2012 until his resignation in June 2022.

== Geography ==
District 17 spans Acadiana and the Florida Parishes, including all of East Feliciana and Pointe Coupee Parishes and parts of Assumption, East Baton Rouge, Iberville, St. Helena, St. Martin, West Baton Rouge, and West Feliciana Parishes. Towns in the district include Greensburg, Clinton, Jackson, New Roads, Plaquemine, White Castle, and Pierre Part.

The district overlaps with Louisiana's 2nd, 3rd, 5th, and 6th congressional districts, and with the 18th, 29th, 50th, 51st, 58th, 60th, 62nd, 64th, and 72nd districts of the Louisiana House of Representatives.

== Recent election results ==
Louisiana uses a jungle primary system. If no candidate receives 50% in the first round of voting, when all candidates appear on the same ballot regardless of party, the top-two finishers advance to a runoff election.

=== 2019 ===
2019 Louisiana State Senate election, District 17
Party	Candidate	Votes	%
Republican	Rick Ward III (incumbent)	Unopposed	100
Total votes		Unopposed	100
Republican hold			

=== 2015 ===
2015 Louisiana State Senate election, District 17
Party	Candidate	Votes	%
Republican	Rick Ward III (incumbent)	Unopposed	100
Total votes		Unopposed	100
Republican hold			

=== 2011 ===
2011 Louisiana State Senate election, District 17
Party	Candidate	Votes	%
Democratic	Rick Ward III	25,645	70.0
Democratic	Larry Thomas	11,000	30.0
Total votes		36,645	100
Democratic hold			

=== Federal and statewide results ===
Year	Office	Results
2020	President	Trump 60.9–37.5%
2019	Governor (runoff)	Edwards 55.1–44.9%
2016	President	Trump 58.6–38.9%
2015	Governor (runoff)	Edwards 66.1–33.9%
2014	Senate (runoff)	Cassidy 51.5–48.5%
2012	President	Romney 55.6–42.9%
