= Nate Williams =

Nate Williams may refer to:

- Nate Williams (basketball, born 1950)
- Nate Williams (basketball, born 1999)
- Nate Williams (FreeBSD)

== See also ==
- Nathaniel Williams (disambiguation)
