= Georgeville, Louisiana =

Unincorporated community in Louisiana

- Unincorporated community
- Location within Louisiana Location within the United States
- Coordinates: 30°38′59″N 90°37′19″W
- Country: United States
- State: Louisiana
- Parish: Livingston
- Elevation: 92 ft (28 m)
- Time zone: UTC-6 (Central (CST))
  - Summer (DST): UTC-5 (CDT)
- ZIP code: 70443
- Area code: 225
- GNIS feature ID: 560827
- FIPS code: 22-21555

Georgeville is an unincorporated community in Livingston Parish, Louisiana, United States. The community is located 8 miles (13 kilometres) southwest of Livingston and 2 miles (3.2 kilometres) southeast of Montpelier on Louisiana Highway 43.

== Georgeville Church ==
The historic Georgeville Church is located here.
