= Doris Lindsey Holland Rhodes =

American politician (1909–1997)

Louisiana State Senator for St. Helena and Tangipahoa parishes
- In office 1936–1940
- Preceded by: Thomas Myers Holland
- Succeeded by: W. G. Jones

Louisiana State Representative for St. Helena Parish
- In office 1940–1948
- Preceded by: W. C. Alford
- Succeeded by: Guy B. McDonald

Personal details
- Born: December 12, 1909 Greensburg, Louisiana, US
- Died: May 30, 1997 (aged 87)
- Resting place: Greensburg Cemetery
- Party: Democratic Party
- Spouse(s): (1) Thomas Myers Holland (died 1936) (2) James Harrell Rhodes (died 1968)
- Children: 2
- Occupation: Newspaper publisher Insurance agent

Doris Lindsey Holland Rhodes (December 12, 1909 – May 30, 1997) was the first woman ever to serve as a member of the Louisiana State Legislature.

== Background ==
Doris N. Lindsey was born in Greensburg, the seat of government of St. Helena Parish, one of the Florida Parishes of southeastern Louisiana. The daughter of Hollis Womack Lindsey and the former Minerva Thompson, she lived nearly all of her life in Greensburg, located south of the border with Mississippi and some fifty miles northeast of the state capital of Baton Rouge.

Her first husband, Thomas Myers Holland (1900-1936), a member of the Louisiana State Senate from St. Helena and neighboring Tangipahoa Parish, died in March 1936, leaving her as a 27-year-old widow with two children, Philip and Dorothy Jane.

== Political life ==
In May 1936, the governor of Louisiana appointed Mrs. Holland to replace her husband as a state senator. She won a special election to complete his term, which extended until 1940. She did not seek a second term in the Senate but instead ran for and was elected and served two terms in the Louisiana House of Representatives from St. Helena Parish.

A woman did not again serve in the state Senate until 1976, when Virginia Shehee of Shreveport began a single term of service in the body. Shehee, also an insurance businesswoman, was the first Louisiana state senator who did not succeed a husband in the position.

Upon leaving politics in 1948, Holland edited and published the family-owned newspaper, the St. Helena Echo, and worked as an insurance agent. She retired in 1968, when she married bank president and department store owner James Harrell Rhodes of Zachary in East Baton Rouge Parish. Apparently the two were married for only a short time, as Rhodes died on June 12, 1968. After Rhodes' death, she remained active in civic matters and the United Methodist Church.

Holland was a member of the Daughters of the American Revolution. Her Senate and House colleagues subsequently named her to the alumni board of the legislature; Governor Edwin W. Edwards honored her at the 1992 Governor's Conference on Women. A Democrat, she was inducted in 1994 as a charter member of the Louisiana Center for Women and Government Hall of Fame at Nicholls State University in Thibodaux. In 2004, she was posthumously inducted into the Louisiana Political Museum and Hall of Fame in Winnfield. Inducted along with Holland Rhodes was later female state Senator Virginia Shehee.

Holland died in the spring of 1997 at the age of eighty-seven. Along with her first husband and her parents, she is interred at Greensburg Cemetery.

Political offices
Preceded by Thomas Myers Holland	Louisiana State Senator for St. Helena and Tangipahoa parishes Doris Lindsey Holland Rhodes; 1936–1940	Succeeded by W. G. Jones
Preceded by W. C. Alford	Louisiana State Representative for St. Helena Parish; Doris Lindsey Holland Rhodes; 1940—1948	Succeeded by Guy B. McDonald
