= Bill Dykes (politician) =

American politician

Member of the Louisiana State Senate from the 11th district
- In office 1972–1984
- Preceded by: Grady Stewart
- Succeeded by: Gerry Earl Hinton

Personal details
- Born: William Edward Dykes; October 23, 1925 St. Helena Parish, Louisiana, U.S.
- Died: February 23, 2015 (aged 89)
- Resting place: Montpelier Cemetery, Montpelier, Louisiana, U.S.
- Party: Democratic
- Spouse: Ivyne Alessi (died 2003)
- Children: 2
- Education: Southeastern Louisiana University
- Occupation: Farmer; politician

Military service
- Branch/service: U.S. Merchant Marine
- Battles/wars: World War II

William Edward Dykes (October 23, 1925 – February 23, 2015) was an American politician. A member of the Democratic party, he was a Louisiana state senator and represented the 11th district from 1972 to 1984. Prior to his legislative service, he had been the mayor of Montpelier, Louisiana.

== Biography ==
The son of Jesse Ambrose Dykes and Willie Mae (née Bickford) Dykes, he graduated in 1941 from the since defunct Pine Grove High School in St. Helena Parish, Louisiana. The school was then under the principalship of John E. Lisenby. He later attended Southeastern Louisiana University in Hammond.

After service in the U.S. Merchant Marine in World War II, Dykes in 1946 founded W. E. Dykes Feed & Dairy Supplies, later Dykes Feed & Fertilizer and WE Dykes Feed & Seed, in Amite in Tangipahoa Parish. He and his wife, the former Ivyne Alessi, had two children. Bryan E. Dykes Sr. (1947–2011), who was married to the former Gloria Mack, was also a feed and fertilizer businessman and was for ten years the mayor of Montpelier, where Bill Dykes resided.

Dykes was a charter board member of the St. Helena Parish Hospital and a member of the Louisiana State Hospital Board. In the state senate, he was the chairman of the Agriculture Committee.

After the 1980 United States census, Dykes was moved into District 12, the same constituency with Sixty Rayburn, a behemoth of the legislature, against whom Dykes stood little likelihood of winning. The redistricting was required to accommodate increased representation by African-Americans, and District 11 was reassigned to the corridor from Hammond to Slidell. The seat went to the Democrat, later Republican convert, Gerry Earl Hinton. When state senator Thomas Henry Hudson of Baton Rouge, the chairman of the committee which had overseen the redistricting, became the Democratic candidate for Louisiana's 6th congressional district in 1986, Dykes worked for the successful election of Republican candidate Richard Hugh Baker to the Louisiana House of Representatives. In 1986, Dykes' residence was not in Louisiana's 6th congressional district (St. Helena was reapportioned in December 1983 into the 8th congressional district), but delivery trucks from his farm-supply business could be seen throughout that district festooned with Richard Baker signs.

On April 23, 1988, Dykes shot and killed Harold Bernard Vige in Montpelier, Louisiana. This incident was classified as a "hunting accident".

== Notes ==
Preceded by Grady Stewart	Louisiana State Senator from District 11; 1976–1984	Succeeded by Gerry Earl Hinton
