= William Lee and Eudora Courtney Bazoon Farmstead =

- U.S. National Register of Historic Places
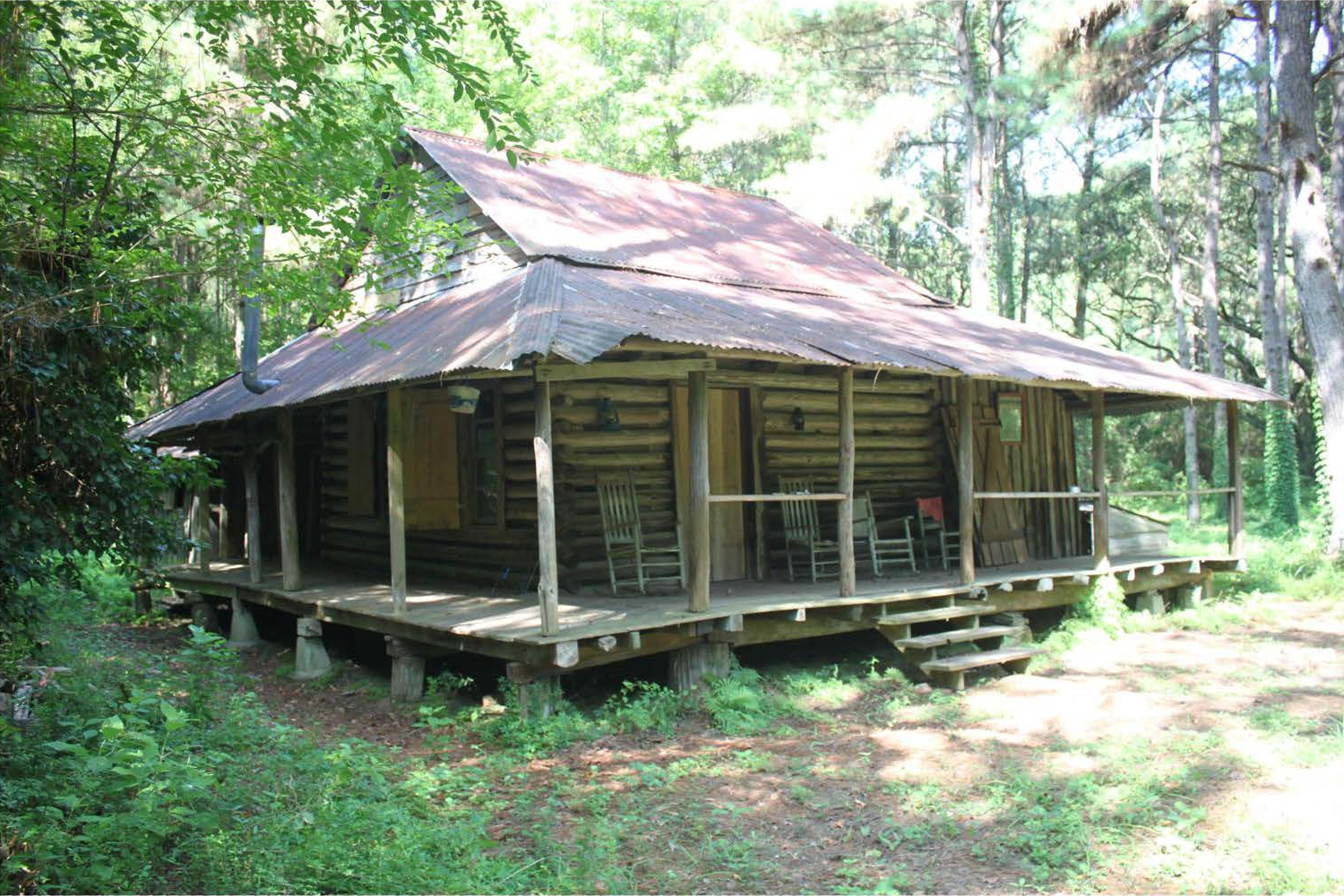

- Location within Louisiana Location within the United States
- Location: George Wright Lane, in the vicinity of Darlington, Louisiana
- Coordinates: 30°51′41″N 90°48′12″W
- Area: 20 acres (8.1 ha)
- Architectural style: Log house, Single pen
- NRHP reference No.: 16000673
- Added to NRHP: September 21, 2016

The William Lee and Eudora Courtney Bazoon Farmstead, in the vicinity of Darlington in St. Helena Parish, Louisiana, was listed on the National Register of Historic Places in 2016. It is notable as a small complex of three log structures.

According to its NRHP nomination, "The Bazoon house and its accompanying log barn are unusually intact examples of the state's log construction and together with a pole well shed compose a rare, complete farmstead of the Upland South tradition in Louisiana."

The main part of the house is a 16 by 17 feet (4.9 m × 5.2 m) single pen of round, peeled logs of about 4-6 inches in diameter, with saddle notching at corners. It has porches that have been enclosed by board-and-batten walls. A separate 10.67 by 16.5 feet (3.25 m × 5.03 m) log pen for a kitchen is connected by a porch.

A pole shed provides a shelter for a hand pump well. A barn about 100 feet (30 m) from the house is the third contributing resource; it has a single log pen about 15.5 by 9.8 feet (4.7 m × 3.0 m) in plan.
