= Greensburg Land Office =

- U.S. National Register of Historic Places
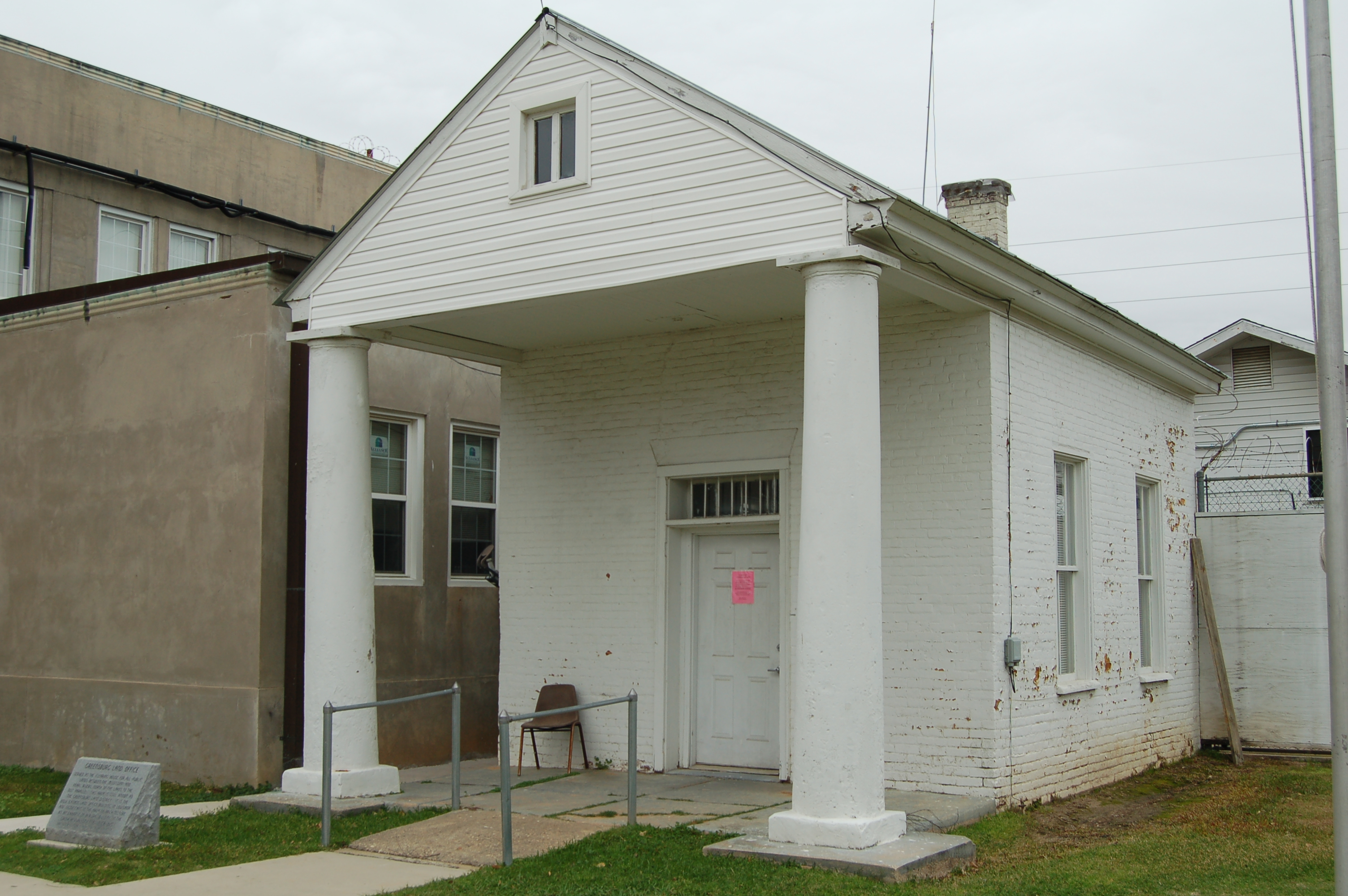

- Location within Louisiana Location within the United States
- Location: Courthouse Sq., Greensburg, Louisiana
- Coordinates: 30°49′44″N 90°40′1″W
- Area: 0.1 acres (0.040 ha)
- Built: c.1825
- Architectural style: Greek Revival
- NRHP reference No.: 80004249
- Added to NRHP: October 7, 1980

The Greensburg Land Office, on Courthouse Square in Greensburg in St. Helena Parish, Louisiana, was built in the 1820s. It was listed on the National Register of Historic Places in 1980.

It is a one-room common bond brick structure with a small portico having two large Doric brick columns. Its interior is dominated by a large paneled Adams mantel.

It is one of the two or three oldest buildings in the "Florida Parishes" of Louisiana.

In 1980 the build was in use as a Veterans' Administration Office. It is located nearly adjacent to the entrance to the St. Helena Parish Courthouse.
