= Liverpool, Louisiana =

Unincorporated community in Louisiana

- Unincorporated community
- Location within Louisiana Location within the United States
- Coordinates: 30°54′55″N 90°40′49″W
- Country: United States
- State: Louisiana
- Parish: St. Helena Parish
- Elevation: 223 ft (68 m)
- Time zone: UTC-6 (Central (CST))
  - Summer (DST): UTC-5 (CDT)
- ZIP code: 70441
- Area code: 225 985
- GNIS feature ID: 1627551
- FIPS code: 22-44620

Liverpool is an unincorporated community in St. Helena Parish, Louisiana, United States. The community is located 5 miles (8.0 kilometres) north of Greensburg and 8 miles (13 kilometres) east of Coleman Town.
