= Chipola, Louisiana =

Unincorporated community in Louisiana

- Unincorporated community
- Location within Louisiana Location within the United States
- Coordinates: 30°55′20″N 90°48′11″W
- Country: United States
- State: Louisiana
- Parish: St. Helena Parish
- Elevation: 230 ft (70 m)
- Time zone: UTC-6 (Central (CST))
  - Summer (DST): UTC-5 (CDT)
- ZIP code: 70441
- Area code: 225
- GNIS feature ID: 560425
- FIPS code: 22-15045

Chipola is an unincorporated community in St. Helena Parish, Louisiana, United States. The community is located less than 10 miles (16 kilometres) northwest of Greensburg and 2 miles (3.2 kilometres) northeast of Coleman Town.

== Etymology ==
It is speculated that the name of the community is derived from the phrase "Chi pa yo ala" which means "The stream that sinks into the earth like the setting moon" in an old dialect of the Creek language.

== See also ==
- Coleman Town, Louisiana
