= Lottie, Louisiana =

Lottie
- Unincorporated community
- Location of Lottie in Louisiana
- Coordinates: 30°33′23″N 91°38′30″W
- Country: United States
- State: Louisiana
- Parish: Pointe Coupee
- Elevation: 30 ft (9.1 m)
- Time zone: UTC-6 (CST)
  - Summer (DST): UTC-5 (CDT)
- ZIP code: 70756
- Area code: 225
- GNIS feature ID: 536745
- FIPS code: 22-45775

Lottie (pronounced Lot tee) is an unincorporated community located in Pointe Coupee Parish, Louisiana United States, along U.S. Highway 190 near its intersection with Louisiana Highway 81. The population is 450. The zip code in this town is 70756.

== History ==
When William Smith was appointed postmaster for a new post office to be located about five miles west of Livonia in 1900, the residents of this rural area had to come up with a name. After some thought, and no consensus was able to be reached, it was suggested that a drawing be held. Lottie Raby's name was drawn and this southern Pointe Coupee post office has been named for her for over a century.
