= Fred, Louisiana =

Unincorporated community in Louisiana

- Former community
- Location within Louisiana Location within the United States
- Coordinates: 30°38′56″N 91°06′19″W
- Country: United States
- State: Louisiana
- Parish: East Baton Rouge
- Elevation: 92 ft (28 m)
- Time zone: UTC-6 (Central (CST))
  - Summer (DST): UTC-5 (CDT)
- ZIP code: 70791
- Area code: 225
- GNIS feature ID: 543220
- FIPS code: 22-27225

Fred was an unincorporated community in East Baton Rouge Parish, Louisiana, United States. The community is now part of Zachary.

== History ==
The community was founded on December 7, 1894 by Eunice Rodriguez Wicker, and is named after a man named Fred Weiss who was the first postmaster. The post office was also the local general store. Much of the land within the village of Fred was used for the production of cotton. There were two cotton gin on the SE side of Plank Road, which were steam operated. The nearby community of Weiss, Louisiana was also named after Fred Weiss.
