= J. E. Jumonville Sr. =

American politician

Member of the Louisiana State Senate from the 17th district
- In office 1968–1976
- Preceded by: Henry M. Kimball
- Succeeded by: J. E. Jumonville Jr.

Personal details
- Born: John Enoul Jumonville; December 20, 1919 Paincourtville, Louisiana, U. S.
- Died: May 4, 1983 (aged 63)
- Party: Democratic
- Children: J. E. Jumonville Jr.

John Enoul Jumonville Sr. (December 20, 1919 – May 4, 1983) was an American politician. He served as a Democratic member of the Louisiana State Senate, representing the 17th district.

== Life and career ==
Jumonville was born in Paincourtville, Louisiana. He worked as a cowman and farmer, and a dredging contractor. He owned a ranch and three Rolls-Royces.

In 1968, Jumonville was elected to represent the 17th district, succeeding Henry M. Kimball. In the 1970s, he ran for re-election, but withdrew after he noticed an election to serve as the sheriff of Pointe Coupee Parish, Louisiana. Jumonville's son J. E. Jumonville Jr. then stood as the only candidate for the 17th district, serving until 1976. The senior Jumonville was later an unsuccessful candidate for the United States Congress.

Jumonville died in May 1983 of heart failure at the St. Charles General Hospital at the age of 63.
