= Nat Williams =

American law-enforcement officer

Nathaniel Williams

Sheriff of St. Helena Parish
- In office June 2007 – present
- Preceded by: Ronald "Gun" Ficklin
- Constituency: St. Helena Parish, Louisiana

Personal details
- Born: May 18, 1956 (age 70) East Feliciana Parish, Louisiana
- Party: Democratic
- Education: Louisiana State University
- Profession: Law enforcement

Nathaniel "Nat" Williams (born May 18, 1956) is an American law-enforcement officer who is the current sheriff of St. Helena Parish, Louisiana, and the first African American ever elected to hold that position in the parish's history.

== Background ==
Williams was born in East Feliciana Parish, Louisiana, and graduated from high school there. He is a graduate of the Louisiana State University Basic Training Academy, in Baton Rouge, the D.E.A. Training Academy and has received Police Internal Affairs training, as well as Police Supervisory training. He was first employed by the Sheriff's Department on May 8, 1990, when he started as a patrolman, working his way through the ranks to Chief of Operation. He was the chief criminal deputy sheriff when he was appointed acting sheriff following the resignation of the elected sheriff in early 2007. He then won the October 2007 primary election for sheriff, garnering 51.6% of the vote in a five-candidate field. Williams was re-elected to a fourth term in 2019.

== Controversies ==
In the past 11 years, three elected sheriffs and one deputy sheriff in St. Helena Parish have been convicted and sent to jail. In 1997, Sheriff Eugene Holland was found guilty of misuse of government funds and property and using prison inmates for personal labor. His replacement, Chaney Phillips, served for only a year before he was convicted for fraud and money laundering that he committed while Parish Assessor. Ronald "Gun" Ficklin took over the Sheriff's office in 1998. Ficklin, the sheriff Williams replaces, resigned after pleading guilty in federal court last year. Ficklin admitted that he worked with a stolen car ring and had state prisoners housed in the parish jail work as his personal race car pit crew. On June 26, 2008, detectives with the Louisiana State Police arrested Jessie Hughes a deputy with the St. Helena Parish Sheriff's Office on charges of molestation of a juvenile and aggravated rape. Williams suspended then fired Hughes as a result of the allegations.

Sheriff Williams recently stated that he will arrest members of citizens patrols that are carrying "assault weapons" and has described them as threats to the community. A group of citizens from the 1st and 6th Wards of St. Helena Parish threatened armed vigilante patrols and check points in the community to control unwanted outsiders. The area was having a lot of thefts. A reporter with The Baton Rouge Advocate asked Sheriff Williams about the vigilante patrols and part of his reply was printed and it went viral prompting a threatening letter from the NRA. Once in context and explanations provided, the matter subsided. Many of the Sheriff's Office employees belong to the NRA and the NRA even provided $3,000 seed money for the Sheriff's Office to buy a drug dog.

== As sheriff ==
Given the 11-year history of corruption in the sheriff's office, Williams has indicated any further criminal activity would not be tolerated. Williams has also said that he would revive a plan to build a new 150-bed jail, add road deputies to improve response time and drug interdiction as well as step up speed limit enforcement on highways.
