= Easleyville, Louisiana =

Unincorporated community in Louisiana

- Unincorporated community
- Location within Louisiana Location within the United States
- Coordinates: 30°55′44″N 90°41′15″W
- Country: United States
- State: Louisiana
- Parish: St. Helena Parish
- Elevation: 246 ft (75 m)
- Time zone: UTC-6 (Central (CST))
  - Summer (DST): UTC-5 (CDT)
- ZIP code: 70422
- Area code: 225
- GNIS feature ID: 1628682
- FIPS code: 22-22377

Easleyville is an unincorporated community in St. Helena Parish, Louisiana, United States, less than 6 miles (9.7 kilometres) north of Greensburg and 10 miles (16 kilometres) west of Kentwood.
