= Robert M. Marionneaux =

American politician (born 1968)

Robert Marionneaux Jr. (born 1968) is an American politician who served District 17 in the Louisiana Senate from 2000 to 2012 and the Louisiana House of Representatives from 1996 to 2000 as a Democrat.
