= Grangeville, Louisiana =

Unincorporated community in Louisiana

- Unincorporated community
- Location within Louisiana Location within the United States
- Coordinates: 30°44′33″N 90°50′01″W
- Country: United States
- State: Louisiana
- Parish: St. Helena Parish
- Elevation: 128 ft (39 m)
- Time zone: UTC-6 (Central (CST))
  - Summer (DST): UTC-5 (CDT)
- ZIP code: 70422
- Area codes: 225, 985
- GNIS feature ID: 560885
- FIPS code: 22-31040

Grangeville is an unincorporated community in St. Helena Parish, Louisiana, United States. The community is located 5 miles (8.0 kilometres) northwest of Pine Grove and 11 miles (18 kilometres) west of Montpelier.

== Etymology ==
In 1916 the New Orleans, Natalbany and Natchez Railway built a line that terminated in the community. The railroad was being used for transporting local timber 28 miles (45 kilometres) southeast to a large sawmill in Natalbany. A local barn was converted into a cooperative business that housed a general store, blacksmith, two doctors, a pharmacy and a brickyard. The railroad named the community after the barn that was converted into a store. The name of the community is borrowed from the word grange which means 'barn' and is derived from Old French.
