= Fordoche, Louisiana =

- Town
- Town of Fordoche
- Seal

- Location of Fordoche in Pointe Coupee Parish, Louisiana.

- Location of Louisiana in the United States
- Coordinates: 30°35′43″N 91°37′34″W
- Country: United States
- State: Louisiana
- Parish: Pointe Coupee
- Incorporated: 1961

Area
  - Total: 2.43 sq mi (6.30 km^{2})
  - Land: 2.43 sq mi (6.30 km^{2})
  - Water: 0 sq mi (0.00 km^{2})
- Elevation: 26 ft (7.9 m)

Population (2020)
  - Total: 910
  - Density: 374.1/sq mi (144.43/km^{2})
- Time zone: UTC-6 (CST)
  - Summer (DST): UTC-5 (CDT)
- ZIP Code: 70732
- Area code: 225
- GNIS feature ID: 2406504
- FIPS code: 22-26280
- Website: www.fordoche.org

Fordoche (pronounced four-DOASH) is a town in Pointe Coupee Parish, Louisiana, United States. As of the 2020 census, Fordoche had a population of 910. It is part of the Baton Rouge Metropolitan Statistical Area.

== History ==
In 1854, the first post office was established at Fordoche, with Thomas Farrar designated as its first postmaster. There are two conflicting stories about how the town's name was derived. One story suggests that it received its name from a Caddo Indian word meaning "wild animal lair" (i.e., the bed of a wild beast) and the other claims that it is named after a Louisiana French term for underbrush found in bayou bottom.

At least two American Civil War battles were fought in and around Fordoche. The Battle of Fordoche Bridge was fought in September 1863. Union troops were sent to prevent the Confederacy from operating in the upper Atchafalaya but the Confederates were successful in driving back the Union forces.

In May 1864, the Confederates were again victorious over the Union troops at the "Skirmish on Bayou Fordoche Road".

The area saw an influx of Italian immigrants after 1890.

Fordoche is the most recently incorporated community in Pointe Coupee Parish. It was incorporated as a village in 1961 and became a town in 1994.

== Geography ==
According to the United States Census Bureau, the town has a total area of 2.4 square miles (6.2 km^{2}), all land.

=== Major highways ===
- Louisiana Highway 77
- Louisiana Highway 81

== Demographics ==
Historical population
Census	Pop.	Note	%±
1970	488		—
1980	676		38.5%
1990	869		28.6%
2000	933		7.4%
2010	928		−0.5%
2020	910		−1.9%
2025 (est.)	847	▼	−6.9%
U.S. Decennial Census

As of the census of 2000, there were 933 people, 341 households, and 285 families residing in the town. The population density was 383.8 inhabitants per square mile (148.2/km^{2}). There were 361 housing units at an average density of 148.5 per square mile (57.3/km^{2}). The racial makeup of the town was 90.68% White, 8.57% African American, 0.11% Asian, and 0.64% from two or more races. Hispanic or Latino of any race were 0.75% of the population.

There were 341 households, out of which 37.0% had children under the age of 18 living with them, 72.4% were married couples living together, 6.5% had a female householder with no husband present, and 16.4% were non-families. 13.8% of all households were made up of individuals, and 5.0% had someone living alone who was 65 years of age or older. The average household size was 2.74 and the average family size was 2.99.

In the town, the population was spread out, with 25.3% under the age of 18, 8.7% from 18 to 24, 28.3% from 25 to 44, 24.0% from 45 to 64, and 13.7% who were 65 years of age or older. The median age was 37 years. For every 100 females, there were 99.4 males. For every 100 females age 18 and over, there were 103.2 males.

The median income for a household in the town was $36,364, and the median income for a family was $40,313. Males had a median income of $32,400 versus $21,146 for females. The per capita income for the town was $15,223. About 12.1% of families and 14.8% of the population were below the poverty line, including 16.6% of those under age 18 and 20.3% of those age 65 or over.
