= J. E. Jumonville Jr. =

American politician

Member of the Louisiana State Senate from the 17th district
- In office 1976–1992
- Preceded by: J. E. Jumonville Sr.
- Succeeded by: Tom Greene

Personal details
- Born: John Enoul Jumonville Jr. December 30, 1942 (age 83) Louisiana, U.S.
- Party: Democratic
- Parent: J. E. Jumonville Sr. (father)
- Education: Louisiana State University

John Enoul Jumonville Jr. (born December 30, 1942) is an American politician and horse breeder. He served as a Democratic member for the 17th district of the Louisiana State Senate.

Born in Louisiana, the son of J. E. Jumonville Sr., Jumonville attended at the Louisiana State University, where he earned his Bachelor of Science degree. He worked as a horse breeder on his ranch, Jumonville Farms. In 1976, he won the election for the 17th district of the Louisiana State Senate, succeeding his father. In 1992, he was succeeded by Tom Greene for the office.

In 1986, Jumonville ran for election to the United States Senate, but was not elected, finishing behind U.S. Reps. Henson Moore (R-Baton Rouge) and John Breaux (D-Crowley), as well as his state Senate ally, Samuel B. Nunez Jr. (D-Chalmette), in the jungle primary. Breaux defeated Moore in the general election (called the runoff in Louisiana).

Jumonville also was as a candidate for the 8th district of Louisiana of the United States House of Representatives, but was unsuccessful, losing to incumbent Rep. Clyde C. Holloway (R-Forest Hill).
