= Pine Grove, St. Helena Parish, Louisiana =

Pine Grove, Louisiana
- Unincorporated community
- Location within Louisiana Location within the United States
- Coordinates: 30°42′36″N 90°45′14″W
- Country: United States
- State: Louisiana
- Parish: St. Helena
- Elevation: 164 ft (50 m)
- Time zone: UTC-6 (Central (CST))
  - Summer (DST): UTC-5 (CDT)
- ZIP code: 70453
- Area code: 225
- GNIS feature ID: 1627925

Pine Grove is an unincorporated community in St. Helena Parish, Louisiana, United States. Pine Grove is located at the junction of Louisiana highways 16 and 449, 9.7 miles (15.6 km) southwest of Greensburg. The community has a post office with ZIP code 70453.
