= Baywood, Louisiana =

- Unincorporated community
- Location within Louisiana Location within the United States
- Coordinates: 30°41′28″N 90°52′59″W
- Country: United States
- State: Louisiana
- Parish: East Baton Rouge
- Elevation: 105 ft (32 m)
- Time zone: UTC-6 (Central (CST))
  - Summer (DST): UTC-5 (CDT)
- Area code: 225
- GNIS feature ID: 547555

Baywood is an unincorporated community located in East Baton Rouge Parish, Louisiana, United States, approximately 30 miles (48 km) northeast of Baton Rouge. Baywood's elevation is 105 feet (32 m) above sea level.
