= Coleman Town, Louisiana =

Unincorporated community in Louisiana

- Unincorporated community
- Location within Louisiana Location within the United States
- Coordinates: 30°53′22″N 90°49′12″W
- Country: United States
- State: Louisiana
- Parish: St. Helena Parish
- Elevation: 207 ft (63 m)
- Time zone: UTC-6 (Central (CST))
  - Summer (DST): UTC-5 (CDT)
- ZIP code: 70441
- Area code: 225
- GNIS feature ID: 1627943
- FIPS code: 22-16361

Coleman Town is an unincorporated community in St. Helena Parish, Louisiana, United States. The community is located less than 2 miles (3.2 kilometres) southwest of Chipola and 9 miles (14 kilometres) northwest of Greensburg.
