= Livonia, Louisiana =

- Town
- Town of Livonia
- Location of Livonia in Pointe Coupee Parish, Louisiana.

- Location of Louisiana in the United States
- Coordinates: 30°33′44″N 91°33′00″W
- Country: United States
- State: Louisiana
- Parish: Pointe Coupee

Area
  - Total: 1.89 sq mi (4.90 km^{2})
  - Land: 1.89 sq mi (4.90 km^{2})
  - Water: 0 sq mi (0.00 km^{2})
- Elevation: 26 ft (7.9 m)

Population (2020)
  - Total: 1,212
  - Density: 640.0/sq mi (247.11/km^{2})
- Time zone: UTC-6 (CST)
  - Summer (DST): UTC-5 (CDT)
- ZIP code: 70755
- Area code: 225
- GNIS feature ID: 2406031
- FIPS code: 22-44690
- Website: www.livoniala.net

Livonia (pronounced Le Vone ya) is a town in Pointe Coupee Parish, Louisiana, United States. As of the 2020 census, Livonia had a population of 1,212. It is part of the Baton Rouge Metropolitan Statistical Area.

== History ==
=== Early history ===
The area of present-day Livonia has been occupied by several American Indian tribes, including Chitimacha, Houma, Tunica-Biloxi, Attakapas, and Coushatta and the site of the conical Livonia Mound. With a base of 165 feet and nearly 31 (30.7) feet tall, is the tallest of 10 remaining Indian burial mounds in Pointe Coupee Parish. Dated to the Coles Creek archaeological culture (400AD-1100AD) period, the mound sits between La 77 and La 78, 150 feet from Bayou Grosse Tête. A second low-rise unnamed mound (destroyed by the mid-1900s) is located 200 feet southeast and a third was reportedly south of these on the water's edge.

=== Colonial history ===
France ruled the Livonia area as part of Louisiana from 1699 to 1763, when the area was ceded to Spain. Spain controlled the area until 1800 when Napoleon took control of Louisiana for France. Some French Canadians migrated to Louisiana earlier, but the majority came between 1755 and 1764 after being expelled from Acadia. Some of the French culture remains in Livonia, as shown by the 2000 census that revealed 5.6% of the parish spoke French, Cajun French, or Louisiana Creole French. The land was sold to the United States in 1803 as part of the Louisiana Purchase.

=== Foundation ===
The Post office opened 1846 and was named by first postmaster James B. Johnson for his native Livonia, Pennsylvania.

== Geography ==
According to the United States Census Bureau, the town has a total area of 1.8 square miles (4.7 km^{2}), all land.

== Demographics ==
Historical population
Census	Pop.	Note	%±
1960	430		—
1970	611		42.1%
1980	980		60.4%
1990	970		−1.0%
2000	1,339		38.0%
2010	1,442		7.7%
2020	1,212		−16.0%
2025 (est.)	1,134	▼	−6.4%
U.S. Decennial Census

Livonia racial composition as of 2020
Race	Number	Percentage
White (non-Hispanic)	996	82.18%
Black or African American (non-Hispanic)	120	9.9%
Native American	2	0.17%
Other/Mixed	52	4.29%
Hispanic or Latino	42	3.47%

As of the 2020 United States census, there were 1,212 people, 572 households, and 323 families residing in the town.

== Education ==
=== School ===
- Livonia High School

== Culture ==
The town is host to the annual Livonia Lions Club Mardi Gras parade which is held the weekend before Mardi Gras Day.

Probably one of Livonia's most famous international tourists was Edward VIII, the Duke of Windsor, who arrived by train following the Mardi Gras celebration in New Orleans, Louisiana in 1950.

== Notable resident ==
Rick Ward, III, former District 17 State Senator was born in Livonia.

== See also ==
- Mound Builders
