= St. Helena Parish, Louisiana =

Parish in Louisiana, United States

Saint Helena Parish
- Parish
- Parish of Saint Helena; Paroisse de Sainte-Hélène (French); Parroquia de Santa Elena (Spanish)
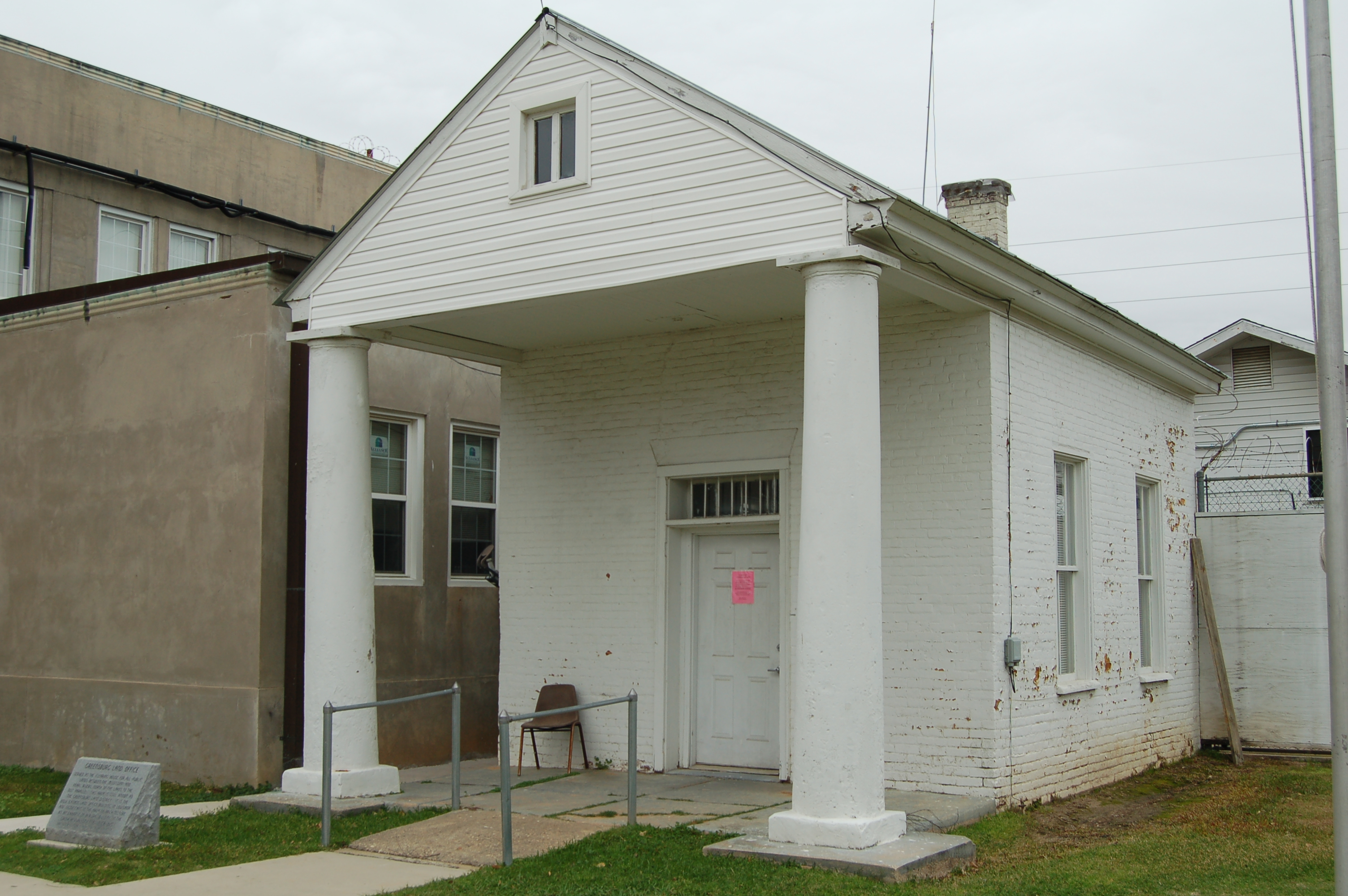
- Greensburg Land Office

- Seal

- Location within the U.S. state of Louisiana
- Coordinates: 30°49′N 90°43′W
- Country: United States
- State: Louisiana
- Founded: 1810
- Named for: Saint Helena
- Seat: Greensburg
- Largest town: Greensburg

Area
  - Total: 409 sq mi (1,060 km^{2})
  - Land: 408 sq mi (1,060 km^{2})
  - Water: 1.1 sq mi (2.8 km^{2}) 0.3%

Population (2020)
  - Total: 10,920
  - Estimate (2025): 10,758 ▼
  - Density: 26.8/sq mi (10.3/km^{2})
- Time zone: UTC−6 (Central)
  - Summer (DST): UTC−5 (CDT)
- Congressional districts: 5th, 6th
- Website: sthelenaparish.la.gov

St. Helena Parish (French: Paroisse de Sainte-Hélène; Spanish: Parroquia de Santa Elena) is a parish in the U.S. state of Louisiana. At the 2020 United States census, the population was 10,920. Its seat is Greensburg. The parish was created in 1810. St. Helena Parish is part of the Baton Rouge metropolitan area.

== History ==
The parish is one of the eight Florida Parishes, a region which was once part of colonial West Florida. The area was annexed to the Territory of Orleans in 1810, after the short-lived Republic of West Florida capitulated to the United States.

In 1832, the southern section of the parish was taken to form Livingston Parish and the St. Helena parish seat was redesignated as Greensburg, where it remains today. St. Helena lost another portion of land in 1866, which was subsequently added to land from other parishes to form Tangipahoa Parish.

From 1964 to 1984, St. Helena Parish was represented in the Louisiana State Senate by the Democrat businessman Bill Dykes. In 1983, as a casualty of redistricting, Dykes bowed out of contention in a race which would have pitted him against long-term Senate President Sixty Rayburn of Bogalusa, Louisiana. Rayburn himself lost his senate seat in 1995.

In recent years, St. Helena experienced a series of scandals involving parish officials. In 1997, Sheriff Eugene Holland (October 13, 1954 – December 14, 2010) was found guilty of misuse of government funds and property and using prison inmates for personal labor; he spent time in prison as a result. His replacement, Chaney L. Phillips (born c. 1950), served for only a year as sheriff before he was convicted of fraud and money laundering that he had committed while serving as the parish assessor. He was given an eight-year prison sentence on conviction in 1998 of having placed a political supporter on his assessor office staff; the individual performed no duties. Phillips was assigned to the Federal Correctional Institution in Englewood, Colorado. He was released on May 23, 2003.

Ronald "Gun" Ficklin, former mayor of Greensburg, took over the sheriff's office from Phillips in 1998, but on February 5, 2007, Ficklin himself pleaded guilty on multiple counts involving his role in operating "chop shops" — reselling stolen automobiles and parts — using state prisoners to staff these activities and as a pit crew for his race car. Ficklin died of cancer while in prison (October 21, 2011).

In 2007, Nat Williams was elected as Ficklin's replacement, the first African American to hold the office in that parish.

== Geography ==
According to the United States Census Bureau, the parish has a total area of 409 square miles (1,060 km^{2}), of which 408 square miles (1,060 km^{2}) is land and 1.1 square miles (2.8 km^{2}) (0.3%) is water. It is located in the northern tier of the Florida Parishes, and within the Baton Rouge metropolitan area.

=== Major highways ===
- Louisiana Highway 10
- Louisiana Highway 16
- Louisiana Highway 37
- Louisiana Highway 38
- Louisiana Highway 43
- Louisiana Highway 63
- Louisiana Highway 432
- Louisiana Highway 440
- Louisiana Highway 441
- Louisiana Highway 448
- Louisiana Highway 449
- Louisiana Highway 1036
- Louisiana Highway 1041
- Louisiana Highway 1042
- Louisiana Highway 1043
- Louisiana Highway 1044
- Louisiana Highway 1045
- Louisiana Highway 1046
- Louisiana Highway 1047
- Louisiana Highway 1048

=== Adjacent parishes and counties ===
- Amite County, Mississippi – north
- Tangipahoa Parish – east
- Livingston Parish – south
- East Baton Rouge Parish – southwest
- East Feliciana Parish – west

== Communities ==
=== Town ===
- Greensburg (parish seat and largest municipality)

=== Village ===
- Montpelier

=== Unincorporated communities ===
- Chipola
- Coleman Town
- Darlington
- Easleyville
- Grangeville
- Hillsdale
- Kedron
- Liverpool
- Pine Grove

== Demographics ==
Historical population
Census	Pop.	Note	%±
1820	3,026		—
1830	4,028		33.1%
1840	3,525		−12.5%
1850	4,561		29.4%
1860	7,130		56.3%
1870	5,423		−23.9%
1880	7,504		38.4%
1890	8,062		7.4%
1900	8,479		5.2%
1910	9,172		8.2%
1920	8,427		−8.1%
1930	8,492		0.8%
1940	9,542		12.4%
1950	9,013		−5.5%
1960	9,162		1.7%
1970	9,937		8.5%
1980	9,827		−1.1%
1990	9,874		0.5%
2000	10,525		6.6%
2010	11,203		6.4%
2020	10,920		−2.5%
2025 (est.)	10,758	▼	−1.5%
US Decennial Census; 1790-1960 1900-1990; 1990-2000 2010

St. Helena Parish, Louisiana – Racial and ethnic composition Note: the US Census treats Hispanic/Latino as an ethnic category. This table excludes Latinos from the racial categories and assigns them to a separate category. Hispanics/Latinos may be of any race.
Race / Ethnicity (NH = Non-Hispanic)	Pop 1980	Pop 1990	Pop 2000	Pop 2010	Pop 2020	% 1980	% 1990	% 2000	% 2010	% 2020
White alone (NH)	4,731	4,699	4,859	4,999	4,494	48.14%	47.59%	46.17%	44.62%	41.15%
Black or African American alone (NH)	4,976	5,108	5,480	5,964	5,846	50.64%	51.73%	52.07%	53.24%	53.53%
Native American or Alaska Native alone (NH)	4	12	10	34	38	0.04%	0.12%	0.10%	0.30%	0.35%
Asian alone (NH)	5	2	10	9	19	0.05%	0.02%	0.10%	0.08%	0.17%
Native Hawaiian or Pacific Islander alone (NH)	x	x	1	0	4	x	x	0.01%	0.00%	0.04%
Other race alone (NH)	1	7	3	21	23	0.01%	0.07%	0.03%	0.19%	0.21%
Mixed race or Multiracial (NH)	x	x	58	77	280	x	x	0.55%	0.69%	2.56%
Hispanic or Latino (any race)	110	46	104	99	216	1.12%	0.47%	0.99%	0.88%	1.98%
Total	9,827	9,874	10,525	11,203	10,920	100.00%	100.00%	100.00%	100.00%	100.00%

Out of Louisiana's 64 parishes, it is one of six that have an African-American Majority (2020).

At the 2010 United States census, there were 11,203 people living in the parish, and at the 2000 U.S. census, there were 10,525 people. The 2019 American Community Survey estimated 10,297 people lived in the parish. The 2020 census tabulated a total of 10,920 residents. In 2019, there were 3,857 households, down from 3,873 at the 2000 census.

The racial and ethnic makeup at the 2019 census-estimates was 52.5% Black and African American, 45.7% non-Hispanic white, 1.1% American Indian and Alaska Native, 0.3% Asian, 0.2% some other race, and 0.2% multiracial; Hispanics and Latin Americans of any race made up 1.8% of the total population. In 2010, the racial and ethnic makeup was 53.3% Black and African American, 44.9% White American, 0.3% Native American, 0.1% Asian, 0.5% of some other race and 0.8% of two or more races; 0.9% were Hispanic and Latin American of any race.

Of the 3,857 households at the 2019 census-estimates, 78.7% were aged 18 and older, 5.4% aged 5 and under, and 18.9% aged 65 and older. The median age was 39.4, up from 35 at the 2000 census.

The parish had an employment rate of 45.9%, and the population was spread throughout 5,330 housing units. An estimated 78.9% of the population owned their housing units. The median value of an owner-occupied housing unit was $100,100, and the median gross rent was $656. The median income for a household in the parish was $43,886; males had a median income of $52,398 versus $31,003 for females. An estimated 24.3% of the parish population lived at or below the poverty line in 2019.

== Education ==
The Elementary and High School in St. Helena Parish are part of the St. Helena Parish School System. The Middle School in St. Helena Parish is part of the Recovery School District of Louisiana. It is in the service area of Baton Rouge Community College.

== Brushy Creek Crater ==
St. Helena Parish contains the only identified meteorite impact crater in the state of Louisiana. This suspected impact crater is a roughly circular depression about 1.2 miles/2 km in diameter. Shocked quartz and intensely fractured quartz have been recovered from fractured and possibly altered sediments comprising its rim. Its age is estimated to be between 11 and 30 ka. It lies about 5.8 miles/9.3 kilometers southwest of Greensburg, in the southwest corner of the parish. Louisiana Highway 37 cuts through the northern edge of this feature.

== Politics ==
Owing in part to its high African American population, St. Helena Parish leans Democratic. It did so in its early history and has also done so since Nixon's 1972 landslide. In 2024 Donald Trump lost the parish by only 44 votes, the closest a Republican has come to carrying St. Helena since the 1972 election.

United States presidential election results for St. Helena Parish, Louisiana
Year	Republican		Democratic		Third party(ies)	
Year	No.	%	No.	%	No.	%
1912	13	5.39%	214	88.80%	14	5.81%
1916	9	2.69%	319	95.51%	6	1.80%
1920	36	8.96%	366	91.04%	0	0.00%
1924	18	8.87%	185	91.13%	0	0.00%
1928	145	19.23%	609	80.77%	0	0.00%
1932	26	2.63%	962	97.37%	0	0.00%
1936	102	7.84%	1,199	92.16%	0	0.00%
1940	80	7.36%	1,007	92.64%	0	0.00%
1944	108	13.65%	683	86.35%	0	0.00%
1948	59	4.95%	469	39.38%	663	55.67%
1952	586	39.57%	895	60.43%	0	0.00%
1956	545	32.27%	997	59.03%	147	8.70%
1960	296	16.36%	678	37.48%	835	46.16%
1964	1,319	65.14%	706	34.86%	0	0.00%
1968	219	6.50%	1,351	40.09%	1,800	53.41%
1972	1,446	52.00%	943	33.91%	392	14.10%
1976	1,046	27.61%	2,622	69.22%	120	3.17%
1980	1,531	31.55%	3,183	65.60%	138	2.84%
1984	2,366	43.53%	2,956	54.39%	113	2.08%
1988	2,006	38.93%	3,013	58.47%	134	2.60%
1992	1,515	26.97%	3,416	60.80%	687	12.23%
1996	1,455	25.95%	3,692	65.83%	461	8.22%
2000	1,965	37.40%	3,059	58.22%	230	4.38%
2004	2,235	40.58%	3,173	57.61%	100	1.82%
2008	2,522	40.78%	3,567	57.68%	95	1.54%
2012	2,529	39.55%	3,780	59.12%	85	1.33%
2016	2,497	41.87%	3,353	56.22%	114	1.91%
2020	2,714	44.07%	3,346	54.34%	98	1.59%
2024	2,804	48.81%	2,848	49.57%	93	1.62%

== See also ==
- National Register of Historic Places listings in St. Helena Parish, Louisiana
- Robby Carter
- Doris Lindsey Holland Rhodes
