= Greensburg, Louisiana =

- Town
- Town of Greensburg
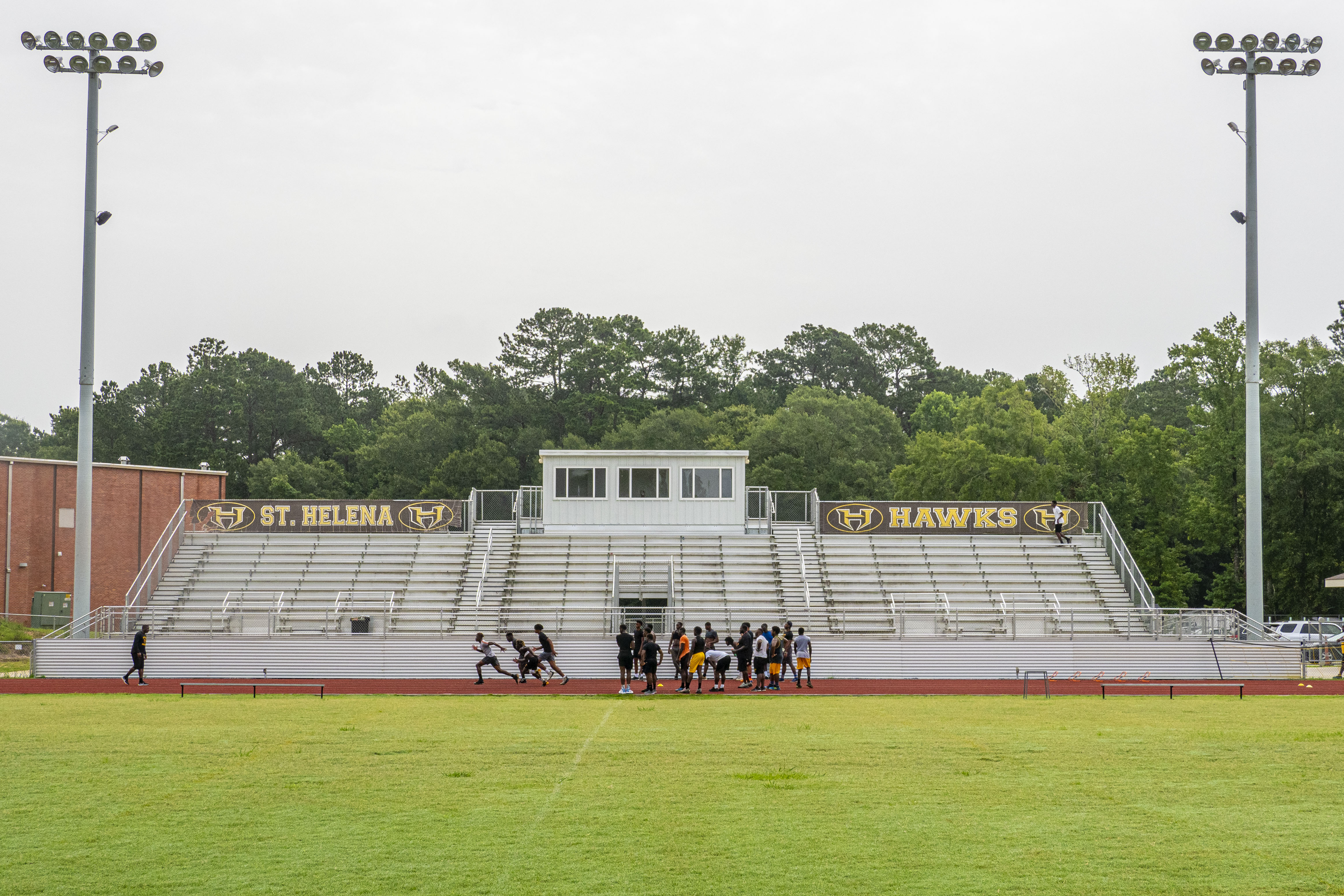
- St. Helena College and Career Academy stadium

- Location of Greensburg in St. Helena Parish, Louisiana.

- Location of Louisiana in the United States
- Coordinates: 30°49′48″N 90°40′11″W
- Country: United States
- State: Louisiana
- Parish: St. Helena

Area
  - Total: 2.53 sq mi (6.54 km^{2})
  - Land: 2.52 sq mi (6.52 km^{2})
  - Water: 0.0039 sq mi (0.01 km^{2})
- Elevation: 223 ft (68 m)

Population (2020)
  - Total: 629
  - Density: 249.7/sq mi (96.42/km^{2})
- Time zone: UTC-6 (CST)
  - Summer (DST): UTC-5 (CDT)
- ZIP code: 70441
- Area code: 225
- FIPS code: 22-31565
- GNIS feature ID: 2406615

Greensburg is a town in, and the parish seat of, St. Helena Parish, Louisiana, United States. The population was 629 in 2020. It is part of the Baton Rouge metropolitan statistical area.

Greensburg is one of the oldest towns in Louisiana. It has two 19th-century properties listed on the National Register of Historic Places, the old land office and the old parish jail.

== Geography ==
According to the United States Census Bureau, the town has a total area of 2.5 square miles (6.5 km^{2}), of which 2.5 square miles (6.5 km^{2}) is land and 0.40% is water.

=== Climate ===
The climate in this area is characterized by hot, humid summers and generally mild to cool winters. According to the Köppen Climate Classification system, Greensburg has a humid subtropical climate, abbreviated "Cfa" on climate maps.

== Demographics ==
Historical population
Census	Pop.	Note	%±
1870	160		—
1880	297		85.6%
1890	280		−5.7%
1900	315		12.5%
1910	268		−14.9%
1920	286		6.7%
1930	262		−8.4%
1940	389		48.5%
1950	423		8.7%
1960	512		21.0%
1970	652		27.3%
1980	662		1.5%
1990	583		−11.9%
2000	631		8.2%
2010	718		13.8%
2020	629		−12.4%
2025 (est.)	615	▼	−2.2%
U.S. Decennial Census

Greensburg, Louisiana – Racial and ethnic composition Note: the US Census treats Hispanic/Latino as an ethnic category. This table excludes Latinos from the racial categories and assigns them to a separate category. Hispanics/Latinos may be of any race.
Race / Ethnicity (NH = Non-Hispanic)	Pop 2000	Pop 2010	Pop 2020	% 2000	% 2010	% 2020
White alone (NH)	417	351	263	66.09%	48.89%	41.81%
Black or African American alone (NH)	207	354	313	32.81%	49.30%	49.76%
Native American or Alaska Native alone (NH)	0	1	4	0.00%	0.14%	0.64%
Asian alone (NH)	1	0	3	0.16%	0.00%	0.48%
Native Hawaiian or Pacific Islander alone (NH)	0	0	1	0.00%	0.00%	0.16%
Other race alone (NH)	0	1	0	0.00%	0.14%	0.00%
Mixed race or Multiracial (NH)	1	3	24	0.16%	0.42%	3.82%
Hispanic or Latino (any race)	5	8	21	0.79%	1.11%	3.34%
Total	631	718	629	100.00%	100.00%	100.00%

As of the 2020 United States census, there were 629 people, 232 households, and 159 families residing in the town.

== Education ==
Greensburg and all of St. Helena Parish are served by the St. Helena Parish School System. Zoned campuses include St. Helena Early Learning Center Elementary (Grades PK-2), St. Helena Art and Technology Academy (Grades 3-6), and St. Helena College and Career Academy (Grades 7-12).

== Notable people ==
- The parents of actor and director Tyler Perry are from Greensburg. In their honor, Perry made Greensburg the birthplace of his most famous character, Madea.
- Stacy Aline Singleton Head, Democratic member of the New Orleans City Council, reared in Greensburg
- Doris Lindsey Holland Rhodes, first woman to serve in the Louisiana Legislature, born and lived in Greensburg
