= Llorens =

Llorens is a Catalan surname. Another form of the name is Lloréns. Notable people with these surnames include:

== People named Llorens ==
- Alberto Llorens (born 1945), Argentine sailor
- Carlos Llorens (born 1969), Spanish footballer
- Carme Llorens Gilabert (1927–2020), Spanish Catalan enameler and jeweller
- Catherine Llorens-Cortes (born 1954), French pharmacologist
- Dave Llorens, American entrepreneur
- Hugo Llorens (born 1954), American retired diplomat
- Jared Llorens, American academic and public administration official
- Joaquín Llorens y Fernández de Córdoba (1854–1930), Spanish Carlist soldier and politician
- José Llorens (born 1938), Spanish sports shooter
- Josep Llorens i Artigas (1892–1980), Spanish ceramic artist
- Lisa Llorens (born 1978), Australian Paralympic athlete
- Nayda Collazo-Llorens (born 1968), Puerto Rican visual artist
- Ramón Llorens (1906–1985), Spanish football player and coach
- Tomás Llorens (1936–2021), Spanish art and architecture historian and museum director
- Tony Llorens (born 1952), American musician, composer, pianist, and actor
- Xavi Llorens (born 1958), Spanish football manager

== People named Lloréns ==
- Chufo Lloréns (1931–2025), Spanish writer
- Cristóbal Lloréns, Spanish Renaissance painter
- José Lloréns Echevarría (1843–1920), mayor of Ponce, Puerto Rico, in 1898
- Luis Lloréns Torres (1876–1944), Puerto Rican poet, playwright, and politician
- Washington Lloréns (1899–1989), Puerto Rican writer, linguist, lexicographer, journalist and literary critic

== See also ==
- Llorenç del Penedès (Spanish Lloréns), a village in the Catalan province of Tarragona
- Residencial Luis Lloréns Torres, a public housing complex in San Juan, Puerto Rico
