= John A. Lejeune =

United States Marine Corps commandant

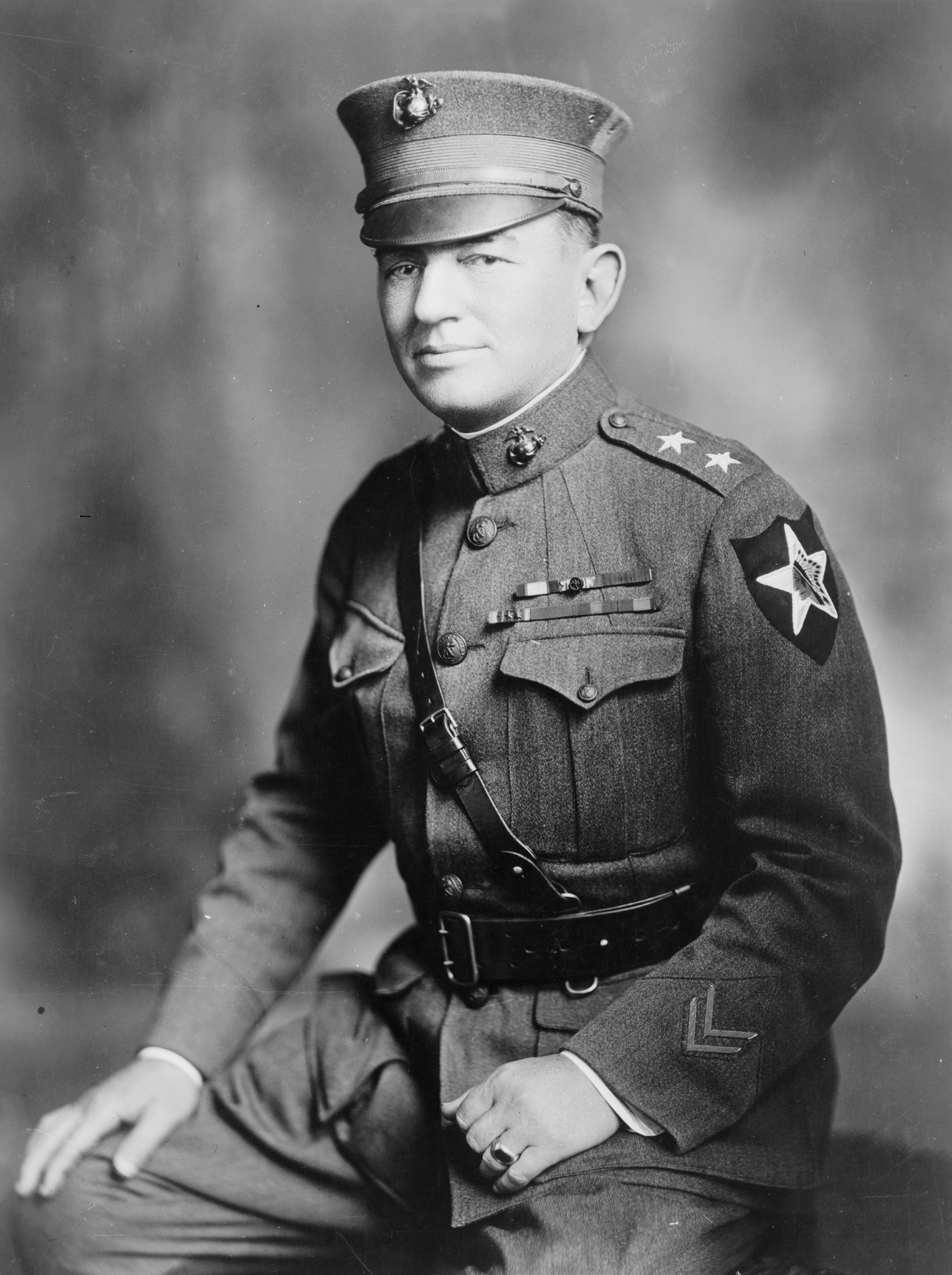
- John A. Lejeune, (Major General) U.S. Marine Corps, 13th Commandant of the Marine Corps (1920–1929)
- Born: January 10, 1867; Pointe Coupee Parish, Louisiana, U.S.
- Died: November 20, 1942 (aged 75); Baltimore, Maryland, U.S.
- Burial place: Arlington National Cemetery, Virginia, U.S.
- Relatives: Spouse: Ellie Murdaugh Lejeune; Daughter: Maj. Eugenia Lejeune, USMC
- Military career
- Allegiance: United States
- Branch: U.S. Marine Corps
- Service years: 1890–1929
- Rank: Lieutenant general
- Nicknames: "Greatest of all Leathernecks" "The Marine's Marine"
- Commands: 1st Brigade of Marines; 4th Brigade of Marines; 2nd Infantry Division; Commandant of the Marine Corps
- Conflicts: Spanish–American War: Puerto Rico Campaign; Philippine–American War; Mexican Revolution: Battle of Veracruz; World War I: Western Front; Banana Wars: Occupation of Haiti; Occupation of the Dominican Republic
- Awards: Navy Distinguished Service Medal; Army Distinguished Service Medal; French Legion of Honor; French Croix de guerre
- Other work: Superintendent of the Virginia Military Institute (1929–1937)

John Archer Lejeune (/ləˈʒɜːrn/ lə-ZHURN; January 10, 1867 – November 20, 1942) was a United States Marine Corps lieutenant general and the 13th Commandant of the Marine Corps. Lejeune served for nearly 40 years in the military, and commanded the U.S. Army's 2nd Division during World War I. After his retirement from the Marine Corps he became superintendent of the Virginia Military Institute.

Marine Corps Base Camp Lejeune in North Carolina was named in his honor during World War II.

== Biography ==
Lejeune was born on January 10, 1867, at the Old Hickory Plantation near Lacour, Louisiana, in Pointe Coupee Parish. He was the son of Confederate army captain Ovide Lejeune (1820–1889). He is French ancestry on his father's side. He attended the preparatory program at Louisiana State University in Baton Rouge from September 1881 to April 1884, leaving to prepare for the entrance exam for the United States Naval Academy. He secured an appointment as a midshipman at the Academy, from which he graduated in 1888, ranking second academically in his class of thirty-two midshipmen. At the completion of a two-year cruise as a midshipman, he was appointed to Naval Engineering, but was desperate to join the Marine Corps. Exhausting all conventional channels, he contacted his senator and eventually the Secretary of the Navy arranged his appointment to the Marine Corps. He was commissioned a second lieutenant in the Marine Corps on July 25, 1890. His immediate family was very involved with the Marine Corps, particularly during World War II. His daughter, Eugenia Lejeune, and his grandson, James Blair Glennon Jr., served with the Corps during the war and after. His granddaughter, Jeanne Glennon Hull, served in the Navy's WAVES and was married to Lt. Col. William Frederick Harris in 1946.

== U.S. Marine Corps career ==
=== 1890s ===
After receiving his Marine Corps commission, Lejeune was assigned to Marine Barracks, New York, on March 31, 1890, for Marine Corps "indoctrination and instruction". Afterwards, he reported for duty to the Marine Barracks, Norfolk, Virginia, on November 3, 1890. While in Norfolk, he met Ellie Harrison Murdaugh; they were engaged just before he began his first tour of sea duty. From October 1, 1891, to July 28, 1893, Lejeune served on board USS Bennington and was promoted to first lieutenant on February 26, 1892. On August 28, 1893, he was assigned to the Norfolk Marine Barracks, where he served until July 31, 1897. While stationed in Norfolk this second time, he married Murdaugh on October 23, 1895.

On August 2, 1897, Lejeune assumed command of the Marine Guard of the USS Cincinnati, where he served throughout the Spanish–American War. On the morning of August 9, 1898, he commanded the approximately 30-man landing party at Cape San Juan, Puerto Rico that covered the withdrawal of 35 U.S. Navy bluejackets from USS Amphitrite and 60 civilian refugees from the town of Fajardo that had been quartered at the Cape San Juan Light that the sailors had defended against a force of approximately 200 Spanish Army troops and civil guard the previous night during the Battle of Fajardo. He was reassigned from Cincinnati on February 17, 1899, and on February 18, 1899, joined the USS Massachusetts to command the Marine Guard on board. He was promoted to captain on March 3, 1899, and left his position on the Massachusetts on May 10, 1900.

=== 1900–1916 ===
From July 3, 1900, to November 12, 1900, Captain Lejeune was assigned to recruiting duty at Boston, Massachusetts. On November 22, 1900, he reported at the Marine Barracks, Pensacola, Florida, to command a Marine detachment there. From January 12 to January 21, 1903, Captain Lejeune was on duty at the Norfolk Barracks, he was en route to duty at New York City on January 26, 1903. He was promoted to major on March 3, 1903, and was on duty assigned to Headquarters Marine Corps in Washington, D.C., from May 15, 1903, to August 8, 1903.

On August 8, 1903, Major Lejeune was assigned to USS Panther to command the Marine Battalion on board that vessel, joining the ships company August 16, 1903. On October 23, 1903, the battalion, with Lejeune in command, was transferred to USS Dixie. From December 16 to December 21, 1904, Major Lejeune was on shore duty on the Isthmus of Panama in command of this battalion, leaving there on the latter date on board USS Yankee.

From January 27, 1905, to May 20, 1906, Lejeune served at the Marine Barracks, Washington, D.C. He then returned to Panama in command of a battalion of Marines from May 29 to July 6, 1906, the battalion being transported both ways on board USS Columbia, returning to Washington Marine Barracks. On March 29, 1907, Major Lejeune was detached from command of the Washington Barracks and ordered to the Philippines. His family—his wife and three daughters—accompanied him on this overseas duty.

Arriving in the Philippines on May 2, 1907, Lejeune assumed command of the Marine Barracks and Naval Prison, Navy Yard, Cavite, on May 6, 1907. He assumed command of the First Brigade of Marines on June 15, 1908, and was promoted to lieutenant colonel on May 13, 1909. He was detached on June 8, 1909, and ordered to return to the United States. He then attended the United States Army War College, graduating in 1910.

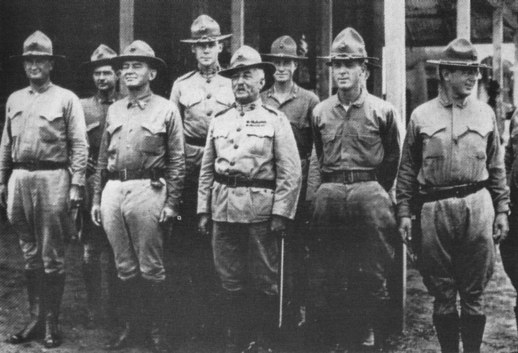
The senior officers of the 1st Marine Brigade photographed at Veracruz in 1914. Front row, left to right: Lt. Col. Wendell C. Neville; Col. John A. Lejeune; Col. Littleton W. T. Waller, Commanding; and Maj. Smedley Butler.

Lieutenant Colonel Lejeune embarked on board USS Ohio on May 26, 1912, with the Second Regiment, First Provisional Brigade Marines, for Cuba. He disembarked at Guantanamo Bay, Cuba, on June 8, 1912, and was in command of the District of Santiago from June 9 to July 14, 1912. On July 15, 1912, Lejeune embarked on board USS Prairie and sailed for Colón, Panama. July 18–29, 1912, was spent at Camp Elliott, Panama.

The Marine Corps Association was founded on April 25, 1911, at Guantanamo Bay by the officers of the 1st Provisional Marine Brigade, under command of Colonel Littleton W. T. Waller. Although the 1st Provisional Marine Brigade disbanded shortly after, the MCA remained active. Two years later, again at Guantanamo Bay, officers of the 2d Provisional Marine Brigade, commanded by Colonel Lincoln Karmany, formally organized the Marine Corps Association. Colonel Karmany appointed then-Lt. Colonel John A. Lejeune as its first head of the executive board. After returning to the United States, Lejeune was again called upon for expeditionary duty. He sailed from Philadelphia, February 20, 1913, as second in command of the First Regiment, Second Provisional Brigade Marines, and disembarked February 27, 1913, at Guantanamo Bay, Cuba. Then-Lt. Colonel Lejeune became the first head of the Marine Corps Association with the goal of professional advancement among Marines. He returned to Philadelphia on board USS Prairie on May 2, 1913.

On November 27, 1913, Lejeune sailed from New York with the 2nd Advanced Base Regiment, his ultimate destination Veracruz, Mexico, but returned to the United States to receive his promotion to colonel on February 25, 1914.

Col. Lejeune participated in the Tampico Affair. Colonel Lejeune and his unit eventually landed in Mexico on April 22, 1914, and participated in the United States occupation of Veracruz. He returned home in December 1914, this time to report to Marine Corps Headquarters in Washington, D.C., to become the Assistant Commandant of the Marine Corps to Major General George Barnett, Commandant of the Marine Corps. He was promoted to brigadier general on August 29, 1916.

=== World War I ===
With the American entry into World War I in April 1917, Lejeune assumed command of the newly constructed Marine Barracks, Quantico, Virginia; however, his overseas service was inevitable, and in June 1918, he arrived at Brest, France. He was promoted to major general on July 1, 1918.

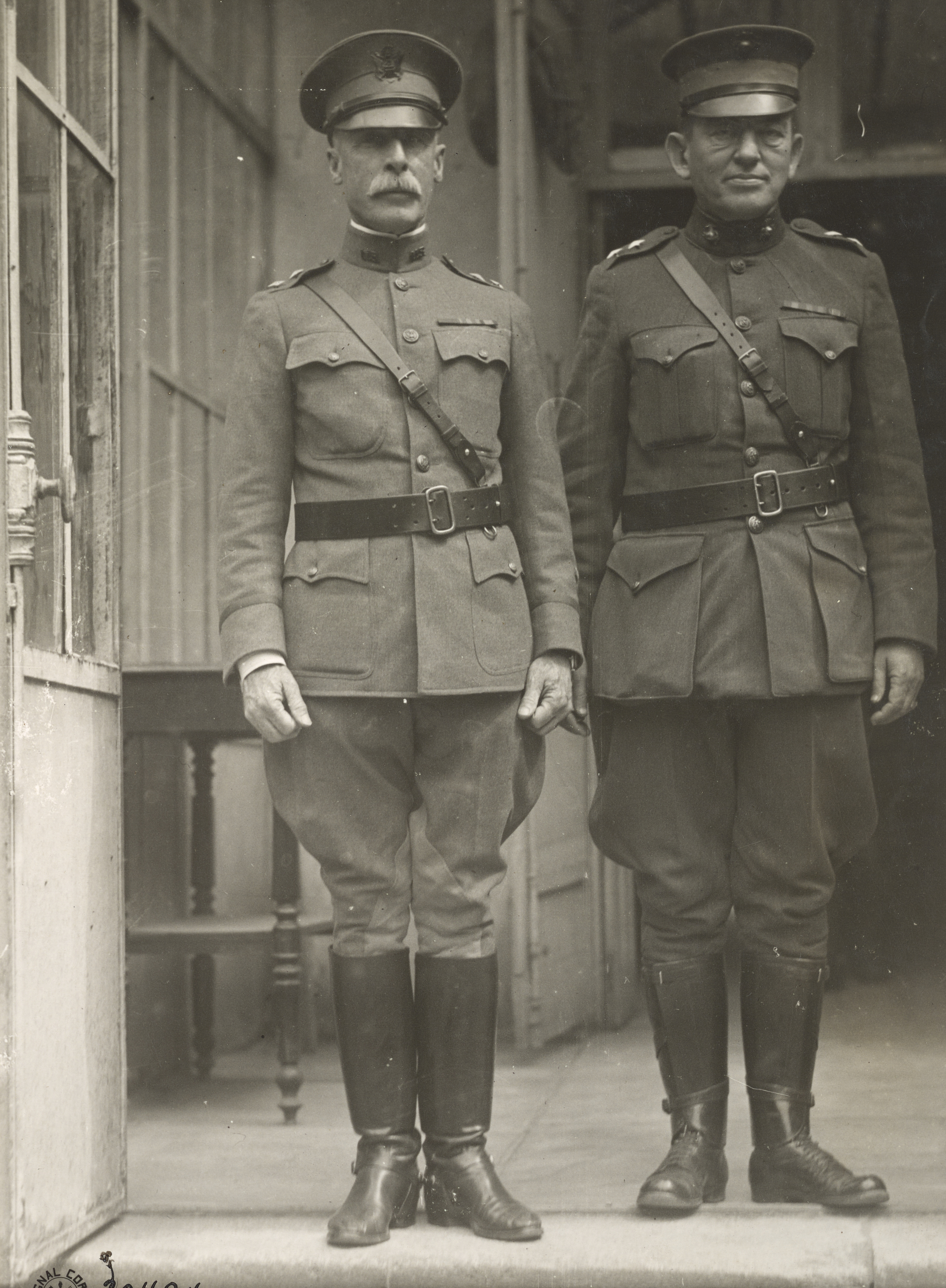
Major General Omar Bundy, former commander of the 2nd Division, and Major General John A. Lejeune of the USMC, the division's current commander, at Marbache, France, August 11, 1918.

Upon reporting to General John J. Pershing, Commander-in-chief (CinC) of the American Expeditionary Forces (AEF) on the Western Front, he was assigned to succeed Brigadier General Charles R. Boardman in command of the 64th Infantry Brigade of the 32nd Division but later assumed command of the 4th Marine Brigade, part of the 2nd Division, immediately following the attack of the division in the Battle of Soissons. Of note, Earl Hancock Ellis was then serving as the brigade's adjutant.

On July 28, Lejeune assumed command of the 2nd Division after its former commander, Major General James Harbord, had been reassigned to command the Services of Supply of the AEF. He was the second marine officer to hold an army divisional command, Brigadier General Charles A. Doyen having previously commanded the division for two weeks.

Lejeune commanded the 2nd Division during the victorious action at the Battle of St. Mihiel, the largest operation yet fought by the AEF, in mid-September. The operation was a success, and Lejeune sent an order of congratulations to the men of his command:

I desire to express to the officers and men my profound appreciation of their brilliant and successful attack in the recent engagement. Our Division maintained the prestige and honor of our country proudly and swept the enemy from the field.

Lejeune emphasized tightly coordinated action that emphasized extensive rehearsal and disciplined artillery gunnery. This discipline enabled infantry elements to follow closely behind barrages that would otherwise be far too risky. This "leaning on the artillery" meant that the enemy faced direct assault while still reverting from the shock of a bombardment.

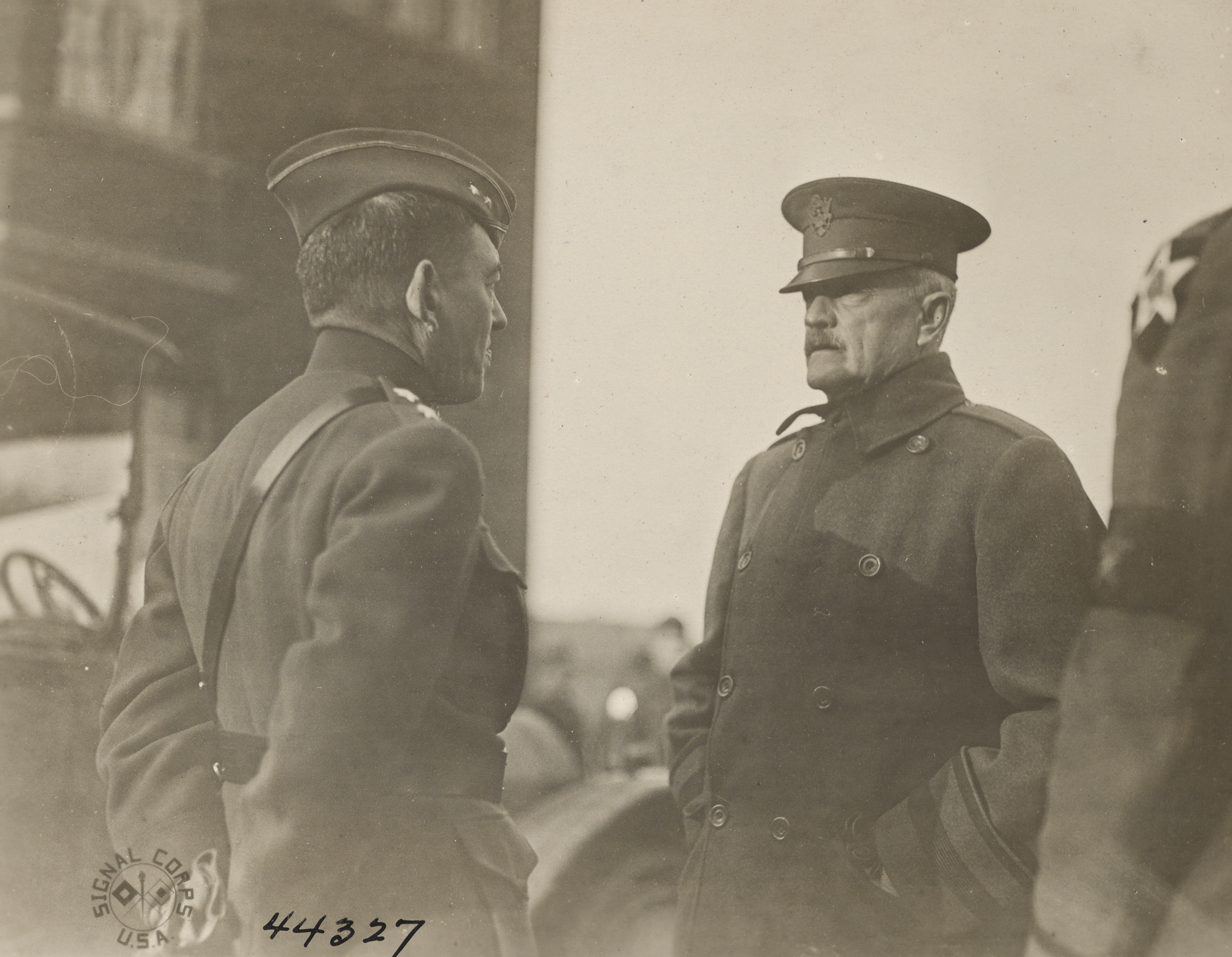
General John J. Pershing, C-in-C of the AEF, congratulating Major General Lejeune, CG 2nd Division, on the fine noble done by men of the 2nd Division, Heddesdorf, Germany, December 1918.

Lejeune stated his philosophy as "The key to combat effectiveness is unity – an esprit that characterizes itself in complete, irrevocable, mutual trust. Now my infantry trusts my artillery and engineers, and my artillery and engineers know this so they will go through hell itself before they let down the infantry. My infantry believe that with such support they are invincible-and they are." Marshal Pétain praised Lejeune as "a military genius who could and did do what the other commander said couldn't be done."

During the war, he was recognized by the French government as a strategist and leader, as evidenced by the Legion of Honor, and the Croix de guerre bestowed upon him by France. The C-in-C of the AEF, General Pershing, awarded Lejeune the U.S. Army's Distinguished Service Medal. The citation for his Army DSM reads:

The President of the United States of America, authorized by Act of Congress, July 9, 1918, takes pleasure in presenting the Army Distinguished Service Medal to Major General John Archer Lejeune, United States Marine Corps, for exceptionally meritorious and distinguished services to the Government of the United States, in a duty of great responsibility during World War I. Major General Lejeune commanded the Second Division in the successful operations of Thiaucourt, Masif Blanc Mont, St. Mihiel, and on the west bank of the Meuse. In the Argonne-Meuse offensive his division was directed with such sound military judgment and ability that it broke and held, by the vigor and rapidity of execution of its attack, enemy lines which had hitherto been considered impregnable.

The U.S. Navy's Distinguished Service Medal was conferred upon him when he returned to the United States following the occupation of Germany. The medal's citation states the following:

The President of the United States of America takes pleasure in presenting the Navy Distinguished Service Medal to Major General John Archer Lejeune, United States Marine Corps, for exceptionally meritorious and distinguished services. Major General Lejeune commanded the Second Division in the successful operations of Thiaucourt, Masif Blanc Mont, St. Mihiel, and on the west bank of the Meuse. In the Argonne-Meuse offensive his division was directed with such sound military judgment and ability that it broke and held, by the vigor and rapidity of execution of its attack, enemy lines which had hitherto been considered impregnable.

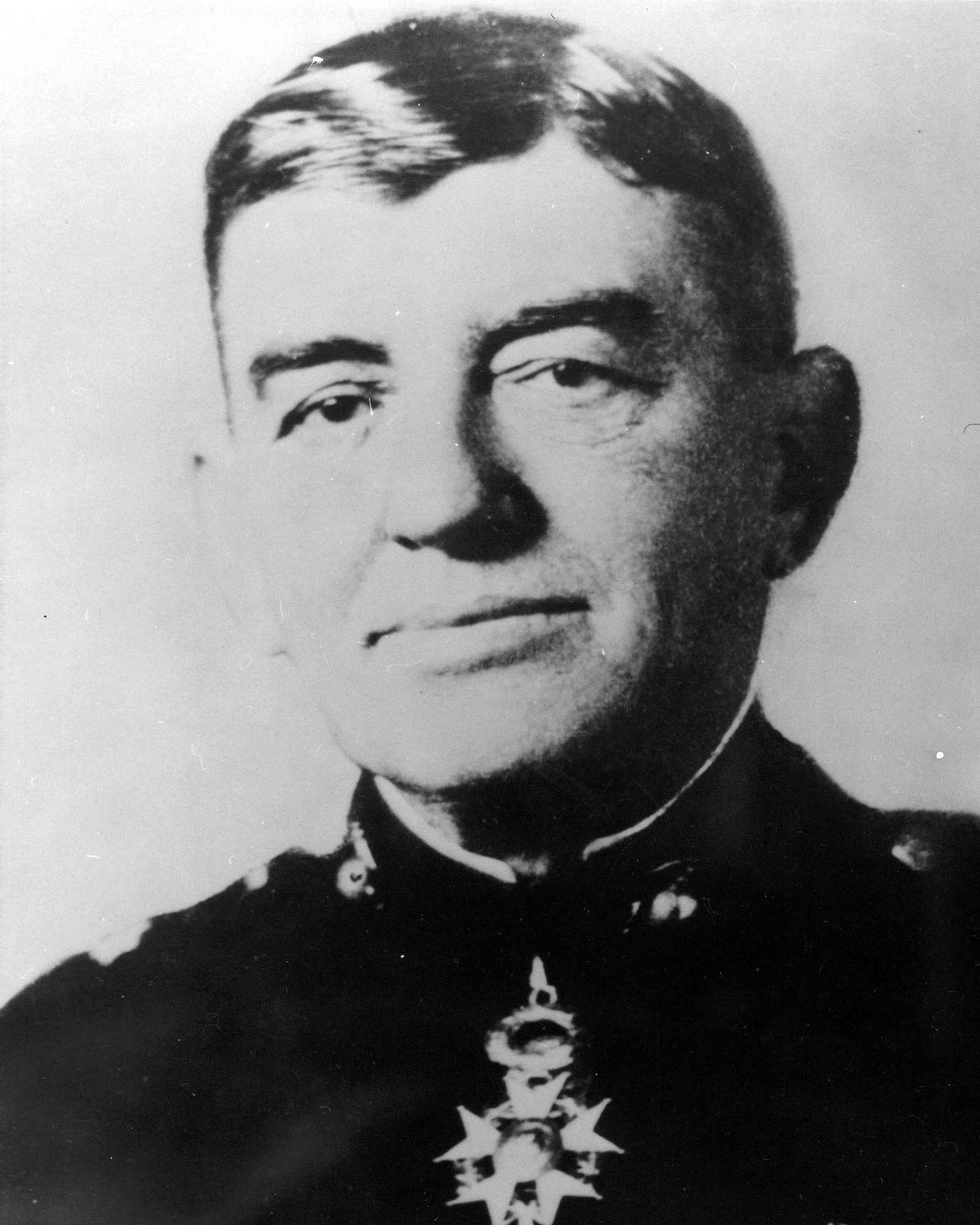
Lejeune with his insignia of commander in the French Légion d'honneur.

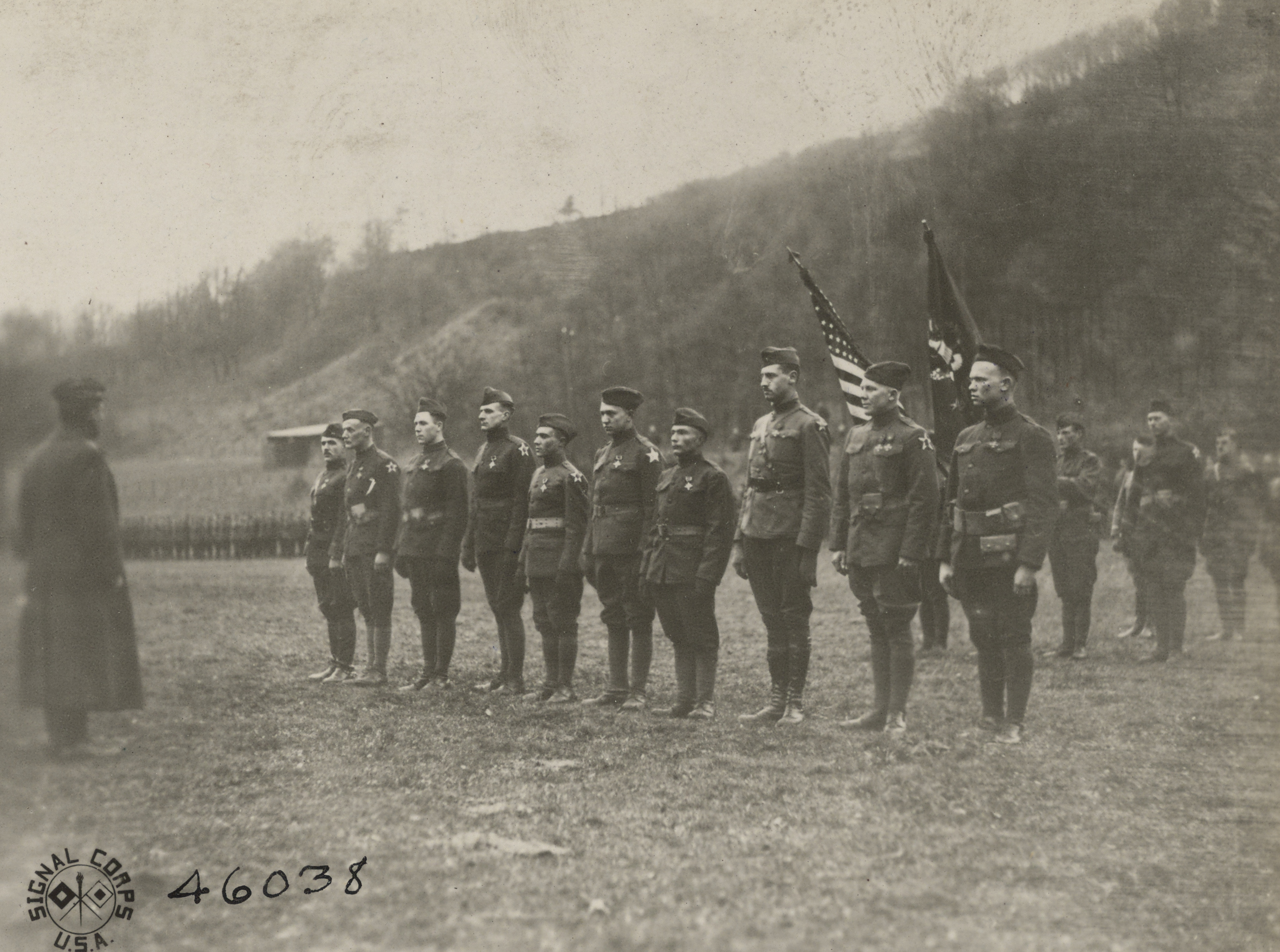
Officers of the 12th Field Artillery Regiment, 2nd Division, being awarded the Croix de Guerre by Major General Lejeune, CG 2nd Division, Vallendar, Germany, January 1919.

Lejeune remained in command of the 2nd Division until August 1919, when the division was demobilized 9 months after the end of the war, including leading it in the march into Germany following the Armistice with Germany in November 1918.

In October 1919, he again was appointed commanding general, Marine Barracks, Quantico, Virginia.

=== Commandant of the Marine Corps ===
Lejeune was appointed as major general and Commandant of the Marine Corps on July 1, 1920. Subsequent to that time, he left his headquarters at Washington several times for tours of inspection in Haiti, Santo Domingo, Cuba, Puerto Rico, to the West Coast and elsewhere. During his service as Major General Commandant, Lejeune presided over what is known as the first enlightenment of the Marine Corps. Lejeune directed intelligence gathering operations in the Pacific in the early 1920s, and drove changes in the organization, training, education, and equipping of Marines, thus transforming them from 19th century colonial naval infantry into a combined arms amphibious force needed to prevail in World War II. Upon the expiration of his second term as commandant, Lejeune indicated his desire not to retire from the Marine Corps, but was relieved as commandant in March 1929.

=== United States Marine Corps League founder ===
The Marine Corps League is the only Congressionally chartered United States Marine Corps-related veterans organization in the United States. Its Congressional Charter was approved by the 75th U.S. Congress and signed by President Franklin D. Roosevelt on August 4, 1937. The organization credits its founding – in 1923 – to legendary Marine Corps Commandant John A. Lejeune. General Lejeune was also charter member, in 1926, of American Legion Junius F. Lynch Post 35, in Norfolk, VA.

=== Freemasonry ===
Lejeune was raised to the Sublime Degree of Master Mason in a Lodge in Coblenz, Germany.

== Retirement, VMI, and death ==
On November 10, 1929, Lejeune retired from the Marine Corps after thirty-nine years of service in order to accept the position of superintendent of the Virginia Military Institute (VMI) in Lexington, Virginia. Lejeune served as the institute's 5th superintendent for eight years until October 1937, when he retired for the second and final time.

In 1930 Lejeune was elected as an honorary member of the Virginia Society of the Cincinnati.

In September 1939, when Hitler's legions invaded Poland, he wrote to Thomas Holcomb, then the current commandant of the Marine Corps, and volunteered to serve once more given his alarm over the crisis in Europe. The offer was gently declined given his age.

In February 1942, the U.S. Congress enacted legislation permitting several officers who had displayed heroism in World War I to be promoted on the retired list, and Lejeune and John Twiggs Myers were advanced to lieutenant general.

Lejeune died on November 20, 1942, in the Union Memorial Hospital, Baltimore, Maryland, and was interred in the Arlington National Cemetery with full military honors.

== Marine Corps Birthday message ==
In the Marine Corps' annual celebration of the establishment of the Marine Corps on November 10, 1775, at Tun Tavern, the following message from Lejeune is read:

MARINE CORPS ORDERS

No. 47 (Series 1921)
HEADQUARTERS U.S. MARINE CORPS
Washington, November 1, 1921

759. The following will be read to the command on the 10th of November, 1921, and hereafter on the 10th of November of every year. Should the order not be received by the 10th of November, 1921, it will be read upon receipt.

1. On November 10, 1775, a Corps of Marines was created by a resolution of Continental Congress. Since that date many thousand men have borne the name "Marine". In memory of them it is fitting that we who are Marines should commemorate the birthday of our corps by calling to mind the glories of its long and illustrious history.
2. The record of our corps is one which will bear comparison with that of the most famous military organizations in the world's history. During 90 of the 146 years of its existence the Marine Corps has been in action against the Nation's foes. From the Battle of Trenton to the Argonne, Marines have won foremost honors in war, and in the long eras of tranquility at home, generation after generation of Marines have grown gray in war in both hemispheres and in every corner of the seven seas, that our country and its citizens might enjoy peace and security.
3. In every battle and skirmish since the birth of our corps, Marines have acquitted themselves with the greatest distinction, winning new honors on each occasion until the term "Marine" has come to signify all that is highest in military efficiency and soldierly virtue.
4. This high name of distinction and soldierly repute we who are Marines today have received from those who preceded us in the corps. With it we have also received from them the eternal spirit which has animated our corps from generation to generation and has been the distinguishing mark of the Marines in every age. So long as that spirit continues to flourish Marines will be found equal to every emergency in the future as they have been in the past, and the men of our Nation will regard us as worthy successors to the long line of illustrious men who have served as "Soldiers of the Sea" since the founding of the Corps.

JOHN A. LEJEUNE,
Major General Commandant

75705—21

== Military awards ==
Lejeune's military decorations and awards include:

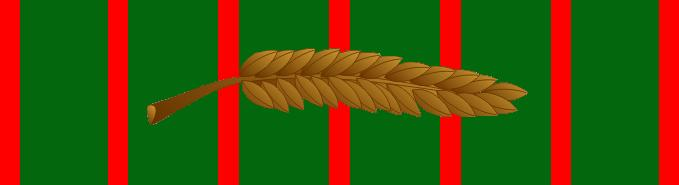

Navy Distinguished Service Medal
Army Distinguished Service Medal	Sampson Medal	Marine Corps Expeditionary Medal w/ three 3/16" bronze stars
Spanish Campaign Medal	Nicaraguan Campaign Medal	Mexican Service Medal
World War I Victory Medal w/ three clasps (three 3/16" bronze stars)	French Légion d'honneur Commander grade	French Croix de guerre w/ Palm

== Honors ==
=== Confederate groups ===
On December 11, 1923, he was decorated with the Cross of Service by Leonora St. George Rogers Schuyler, President General of the United Daughters of the Confederacy.

=== U.S. Postal service honor ===
On November 10, 2005, the United States Postal Service issued the Distinguished Marines stamps in which Lejeune was honored.

=== Statues and memorials ===
On November 10, 2000, a life-sized bronze statue of Lejeune was unveiled on the grounds of the Pointe Coupee Parish Courthouse in New Roads, Louisiana. Patrick F. Taylor, chairman and CEO of Taylor Energy Company, along with the retired Marine Corps Major General Ronald G. Richard (former commanding general of Marine Corps Base Camp Lejeune) were in attendance. Taylor, who financed the Lejeune statue project, joined the Marine Corps Officer Training program as a student at Louisiana State University, but a heart problem kept him from receiving his commission. Taylor commissioned sculptor Patrick Dane Miller to fashion it to be historically accurate.

Statues of Lejeune also stand outside the National Museum of the Marine Corps in Virginia, in the center of the traffic circle aboard MCB Camp Lejeune NC, outside of Lejeune Hall at the United States Naval Academy, outside of Lejeune Hall on MCB Quantico, Virginia, and the Louisiana War Memorial in downtown Baton Rouge, Louisiana next to the destroyer USS Kidd.

=== Namesakes ===
Lejeune, legendary among Marines and often referred to as "the greatest of all Leathernecks", served with the Marine Corps for over 40 years. In his honor, the following bear his name:

- Camp Lejeune, North Carolina
- USS Lejeune (AP-74), Navy transport ship
- Lejeune Hall, Camp Lejeune, North Carolina
- Lejeune Hall, Quantico, Virginia
- Lejeune Hall, Louisiana State University
- Lejeune Hall, United States Naval Academy
- Lejeune Hall, Virginia Military Institute
- Lejeune High School, Jacksonville, North Carolina
- John A. Lejeune Lodge No. 350 Ancient Free & Accepted Masons, Quantico, Virginia

Fictional character Jonathan "John" Archer(Star Trek: Enterprise; played by actor Scott Bakula) *most likely* is the namesake of Lieutenant General John Archer Lejeune.

== See also ==
- List of Historically Important U.S. Marines

== Sources ==
- Bates, Ralph. Preston, Mary Ann; Bates, Lyn (eds.). A Marine Called Gabe. Ralph Stoney Bates Sr.
- "Biography of Lieutenant General John Archer Lejeune (1867–1942)". Louisiana's Military Heritage: Sons & Daughters of the State. USS Kidd Veterans Memorial, Louisiana Naval War Memorial Commission. Archived from the original on September 30, 2007.
- "Major General John A. Lejeune Birthday Message". Customs and Traditions. United States Marine Corps History Division. 1921.
- "Major General John Archer Lejeune, USMC". Who's Who in Marine Corps History. United States Marine Corps History Division. Archived from the original on October 7, 2010.
- "John A. Lejeune, Class of 1888". United States Naval Academy alumni. United States Navy.
- Allan Reed Millett; Jack Shulimson, eds. (2004). Commandants of the Marine Corps. Annapolis, Maryland: Naval Institute Press. pp. 194–213. ISBN 978-0-87021-012-9.

Military offices
Preceded by Major General George Barnett	Commandant of the United States Marine Corps; 1920–1929	Succeeded by Major General Wendall C. Neville
