= Gulf of Mexico oil spill =

There have been three major oil spills in the Gulf of Mexico:

- The Ixtoc I oil spill, from June 1979 to March 1980
- The Deepwater Horizon oil spill, from April 2010 to August 2010
- The Taylor oil spill, from September 2004 to March 18 2022
