= Patrick F. Taylor Science and Technology Academy =

Coordinates: 29°53′33″N 90°10′42″W

Location
- 701 Churchill Pkwy; Avondale, Louisiana 70094; United States

Information
- School type: Magnet
- Founder: Jefferson Public School Board
- Status: Operating
- School district: Jefferson Parish School District
- Principal: Shawn Rome
- Teaching staff: 44.05 (FTE)
- Grades: 6–12
- Enrollment: 881 (2023–2024)
- Student to teacher ratio: 20.00
- Colors: Royal blue, gray, and black
- Athletics conference: LHSAA District 9-3A
- Mascot: Tiger
- Nickname: Tigers
- Website: patricktaylor.jpschools.org

Patrick F. Taylor Science & Technology Academy is a comprehensive college preparatory magnet school. In August 2004, the school opened with 7th and 8th grades and has grown to include 6th through 12th grades in recent years.

PFTSTA is located in Avondale, Louisiana. Named after Patrick F. Taylor, this Sci-tech school currently has grades 6-12. The students are on a block schedule, four separate 90 minute (an hour and a half) courses a day that changes the following semester. The school campus is now located in a new facility on the Westbank in Avondale by the Alario Center, and each student is issued a school laptop on which to do classwork, projects, and homework. The school's current principal is Shawn Rome.

== History ==
The school was started in 2002 as a half day specialty school called Jefferson Parish School for Science and Technology (JPSST). Students attending public schools in the parish would enroll in JPSST - they would attend their home-based school half a day and JPSST half a day - they were transported between their home-based school and JPSST by bus daily to attend either the morning or afternoon session (morning transportation there or afternoon transportation home were arranged or provided by students' parents). Starting off with only two grades (7th and 8th), the school soon became a full day magnet school by the 2005–2006 school year and was renamed Patrick F. Taylor Science and Technology Academy (PFTSTA), after Patrick F. Taylor, an oil business tycoon famous for creating the TOPS program (which helps pays college tuition for students who attain a minimum GPA and ACT score). Patrick Taylor's widow, Ms. Taylor, continues to play a close role in the development of the school. At the time, the school included 6th - 9th grade and was located in the Jefferson Parish Public School System special services building, occupying the entire second floor of the building. On August 29, 2005, only a few weeks into the school year, Hurricane Katrina struck the Gulf Coast, causing evacuations and New Orleans school closures. Students were able to keep in touch with their teachers and one another via internet using the discussion forums set up on the school's eBoard. The rest of the 2005–2006 school year continued with a smaller number of students, but still successfully.

For the 2006–2007 school year, PFTSTA moved to its own building in Jefferson, Louisiana, only a few blocks away from the Parish School Headquarters building. The school moved into what was previously Deckbar Elementary. The larger complex included three classroom buildings, a cafeteria building, and a smaller building used as a computer lab. The oldest building was built in the 1920s. With each new year, the school was getting progressively bigger as each new grade was added. At this point, PFTSTA grades 8 - 10 and about 115 students. A 6th grade was added in 2007.

The 2008–2009 school year was the first year in which Patrick Taylor had a full school. PFTSTA's 220 students prepared to say goodbye to its first graduating class. The commencement ceremony took place at the Alario Center, on the West Bank of Jefferson Parish.

In 2011, PFTSTA's name was changed to Patrick F. Taylor Science and Technology Regional Academy (PFTSTRA) to further clarify the role the school plays in Southeastern Louisiana; however, the new name is not widely used in informal speech. That same year, the federal government awarded Taylor Academy the Blue Ribbon Award for Scholastic achievement, one of the highest honors a public school can receive.

Several traditions have been started at Patrick Taylor Academy which are celebrated by the students and faculty. These include Founder's Day, a celebration of Mr. Taylor and the work he did to proliferate education in Louisiana. Ms. Taylor attends the event, and students put on performances, eat food, and sing the alma mater together.

== Work and grades ==
Patrick Taylor is a Jefferson Parish specialty school; the students have to apply to the school and exhibit certain grades in order to be accepted. Test scores from the March previous to application are to be viewed as well as their final report cards from last year, the year before, and the year the student is in, in order to be accepted into PFTSTA.

== Clubs and electives ==
Patrick Taylor has a various groups of clubs and electives. Two electives are picked for grades eighth and up. Clubs are extracurricular and have meetings during lunch or after school.

=== Electives ===
- Fine Arts Survey - The history of art from prehistoric times to modern art.
- Computer Science - How computers work.
- Web Mastery - Become a master of HTML.
- Journalism - Interview and write articles for the year book, newsletter and other publications.
- Pre-engineering - Science of Technology / Design and Modeling.
- IED - Introduction to Engineering Design (CAD with Inventor).
- Spanish - A study of the Spanish language.

There are many other electives added as the years go by.

=== Clubs ===
- Academic Games
- Bookmarked (book discussion group)
- BRiMS (Books Rule in Middle School)
- HOSA (Health Occupations Students of America)
- International Cultures Club
- Jr. Beta
- Key Club
- MATHCOUNTS
- Model United Nations
- Mu Alpha Theta
- National Honor Society
- National Junior Honor Society
- Quiz Bowl
- Science Olympiad
- Students Against Alcohol and Drugs (SAAD)
- Student Government Association
- Band
- Lego Robotics
- 4-H
- Debate

== Athletics ==
Taylor Science and Technology Academy athletics competes in the LHSAA.

Sports sponsored by the school include:

- Basketball
- Football
- Cross-Country
- Soccer
- Softball
- Baseball
- Swimming
- Track and Field
- Volleyball
- Cheerleading
- Dance team
- Bowling
- Wrestling
