= Alario Center =

Multi-purpose arena in Westwego, Louisiana, U.S.

John A. Alario, Sr. Event Center
- Alario Center
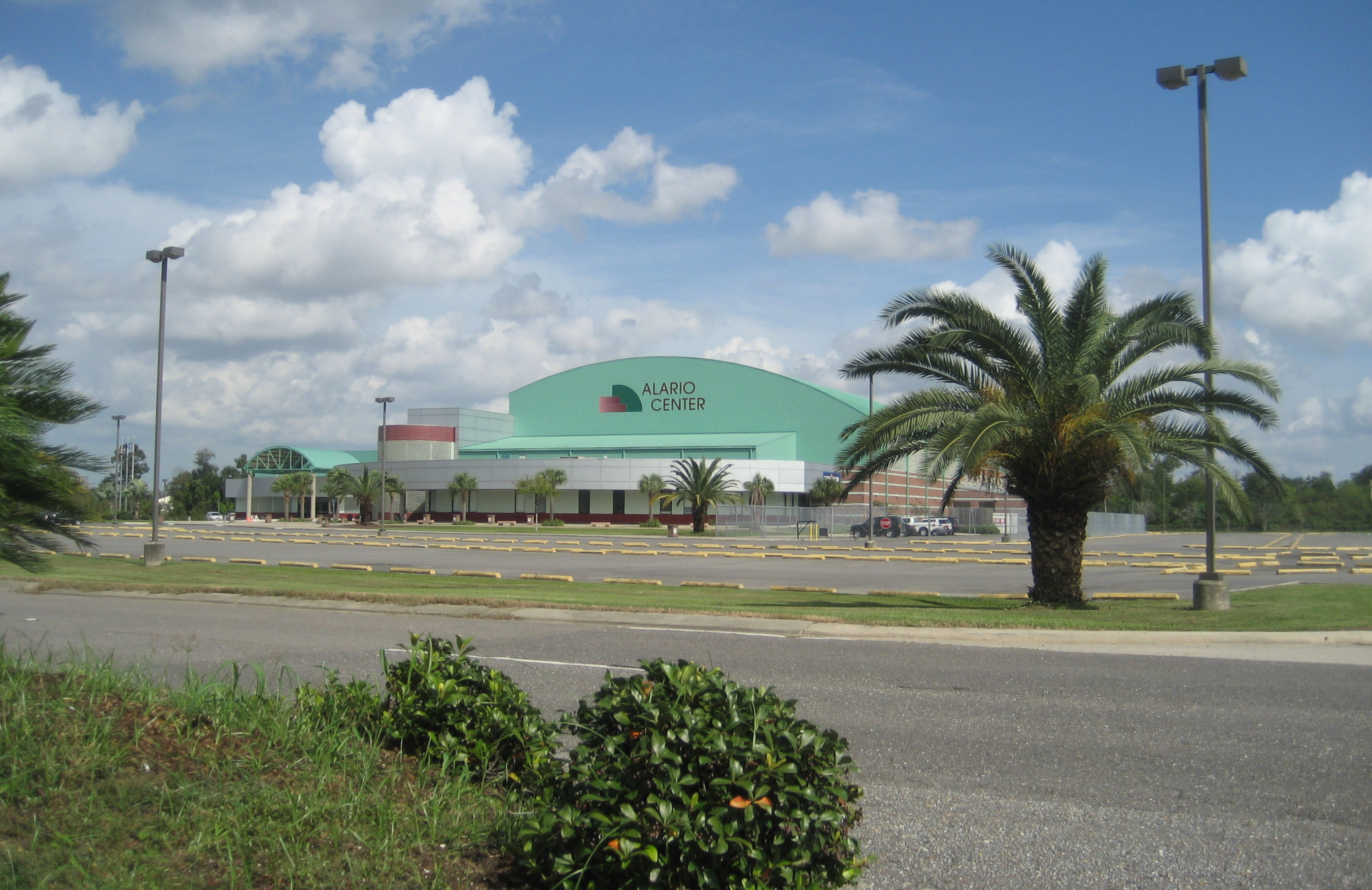
- Interactive map of John A. Alario, Sr. Event Center
- Address: 2000 Segnette Boulevard
- Location: Westwego, Louisiana, U.S.
- Coordinates: 29.90516°N 90.16283°W
- Owner: Louisiana Stadium and Exposition District
- Capacity: 2,400

Construction
- Opened: 1999

Website
- alariocenter.com

The John A. Alario Sr. Event Center, commonly shortened as the Alario Center, is a 2,400-seat multi-purpose arena and convention center in Westwego, Louisiana, United States, a suburb of New Orleans. The facility was approved for construction in 1993, and opened in 1999. The arena was most notably used as the practice facility for the NBA's New Orleans Pelicans (formerly Hornets) from 2002 to 2013. The Alario Center features six hardwood courts under one roof.

The Alario Center also hosts many annual sports events including AAU Boys Basketball tournaments, boxing matches, cheerleading/dance competitions, wrestling, professional wrestling, gymnastics meets and volleyball tournaments. There are also many non-sports events that are annually held at the Alario Center including the FIRST Robotics Competition Bayou Regional, the Governor's West Bank Luncheon, concerts, college graduation ceremonies and numerous sales & expos.

On April 4, 2014, the venue hosted Supercard of Honor VIII, a professional wrestling event promoted by national wrestling promotion Ring of Honor (ROH). On February 19, 2022, it hosted No Surrender livestreaming event, promoted by Impact Wrestling. In 2024, Total Nonstop Action Wrestling (TNA) returned to the venue with the 2024 edition of their No Surrender livestreaming event

Because of the center's size and location in Jefferson Parish, many parish schools hold events there, including graduations. One such school is Patrick F. Taylor Science and Technology Academy.

The Bayou Segnette Sports Complex, which the Alario Center is part of also includes Segnette Field, a baseball stadium that is the home of the Loyola University New Orleans' Wolfpack baseball program.

The Alario Center is named for the father of John A. Alario Jr., the dean of the Louisiana State Legislature.

== See also ==
- List of convention centers in the United States
- List of music venues
