= Jared Llorens =

American academic

Member, Federal Salary Council
- Designate
- Assuming office TBA
- Appointed by: Joe Biden
- Succeeding: Ronald Sanders

Member of the Federal Salary Council
- Designate
- Assumed office TBA

9th Dean of the E. J. Ourso College of Business
- Incumbent
- Assumed office November 5, 2020
- Preceded by: Richard D. White Jr.

Personal details
- Born: Jared James Llorens
- Education: Loyola University New Orleans (BA); University of Texas at Austin (MPA); University of Georgia (Ph.D., Public Administration)

Jared James Llorens is an American academic and public administration official who was appointed to serve as a member of the Federal Salary Council. Llorens is also the dean of the E. J. Ourso College of Business at Louisiana State University.

== Early life and education ==
Llorens is a native of Baton Rouge, Louisiana. He earned a Bachelor of Arts degree in English from Loyola University New Orleans, a Master of Public Administration from the University of Texas at Austin, and a Doctor of Public Administration from the University of Georgia School of Public and International Affairs.

== Career ==
Llorens has served as an analyst in the United States Office of Personnel Management and United States Department of Labor. He was the editor-in-chief of Public Personnel Management and a fellow at the National Academy of Public Administration. In 2007, Llorens became an associate professor of public administration at the University of Kansas. He joined the Louisiana State University Department of Public Administration in 2009 and became chair in 2015. He became the ninth dean of the E. J. Ourso College of Business on November 1, 2020. In March 2022, Llorens was appointed by President Joe Biden to serve as a member of the Federal Salary Council.
