= E. J. Ourso College of Business =

Business school of Louisiana State University

E.J. Ourso College of Business
- Type: Public
- Established: 1928
- Parent institution: Louisiana State University
- Dean: T. Russell Crook
- Location: Baton Rouge, LA, US
- Website: lsu.edu/business

The E. J. Ourso College of Business is Louisiana State University's business school and was established originally in 1928 as the College of Commerce.

== History ==
As early as 1899, LSU organized a four-year course in commerce, leading to a bachelor's degree. On June 11, 1928, the University Board of Supervisors established the College of Commerce at its annual meeting. The college would be housed in Himes Hall with J. B. Trant presiding as dean. In 1959, the college was reorganized and renamed the College of Business Administration. Almost 20 years, later, the college found a new home in the Center for Engineering and Business Administration (CEBA), which has since been renamed Patrick F. Taylor Hall. Another renaming of the college took place in 1996, when "E. J. Ourso" was added to honor the college's benefactor. In 2005, “Administration” was dropped from the college's name.

== Degrees ==
=== Undergraduate ===
Accredited by the Association to Advance Collegiate Schools of Business (AACSB) continuously since 1931, the E. J. Ourso College offers undergraduate degrees in:

- Accounting
- Economics
- Entrepreneurship
- Finance
- General Business
- Information Systems & Decision Science
- International Trade & Finance
- Management
- Marketing

=== Graduate ===
The E. J. Ourso College offers a master's in accountancy, analytics, economics, finance, and public administration and is recognized for its LSU Flores MBA Program. PhDs are offered in:

- Accounting LSU Department of Accounting
- Economics LSU Department of Economics
- Finance (LSU Department of Finance)
- Information Systems & Decision Science

The E. J. Ourso College is home to several noteworthy centers and institutes and houses the LSU Center for Internal Auditing, recognized by the Institute of Internal Auditors.

It is certified by the Association to Advance Collegiate Schools of Business.

== Business Education Complex ==
Louisiana State University Business Education Complex

The Louisiana State University Business Education Complex is a campus extension located in Baton Rouge and designated to house part of the E. J. Ourso College of Business. The groundbreaking ceremony took place on March 19, 2010, the anticipated completion date was December 2011. The purpose of the BEC is to have the Business School located in one central area, thus creating a “campus within a campus”. The project is located on Nicholson Drive Extension next to Patrick F. Taylor Hall, formally known as Center for Engineering and Business Administration (CEBA), on LSU’s Baton Rouge campus. The BEC will consist of four buildings with approximately 156,385 square feet that will be used for undergraduate and graduate students attending Business College. It will also include a large public space for dining as well as faculty offices and offices for administration staff. One of the four buildings will house a large auditorium.

=== Cost/Funding ===
The budget for the Business Education Complex was $60 million. At a press conference in early November 2009, Louisiana’s former Governor, Bobby Jindal, announced the state would commit $30 million in capital outlay funds for the new Business Education Complex. Michael V. Martin, Chancellor at Louisiana State University and A&M College, commented that, “The Business Education Complex is a visionary example of the investment of the state of Louisiana and private citizens working together with educational institutions to improve economic sustainability and workforce development for the future” &. Even with the State's $30 million and LSU privately raising $18 million there is a $12 million shortfall. To cover the shortfall LSU is planning to use an $8.1 million internal bridge loan that will be secured by LSU’s new revenue acquired from the Southeastern Conference’s deals with CBS and ESPN. The additional $4 million will come from the private LSU Foundation in anticipation of bequests made over the next two years. The complex is the first building on LSU’s campus that is a public-private partnership. Martin has stated with the favorable construction market he hopes the internal bridge loan of $8.1 million will not be needed.

=== Design ===
After presenting the lowest bid of $39,978,000, Lemoine / Brasfield & Gorrie was selected to construct the complex. Coleman Partners Architects designed the BEC with a blending of glass, metal and stone with sloped gabled roofs and arches in order to capture and reflect LSU’s Italianate architectural style.

The complex consists of four buildings surrounding a 14,000 square foot exterior quadrangle lined with covered galleries. The largest building is a four story, 56,000 square foot Rotunda. This building is used for the Business School administrative offices, and academic affairs. The ground floor has the student’s common area, lobby, and a café along with a Business Disaster Recovery Command Center. The second building is a two-story structure called the Undergraduate Pavilion, which will include classrooms, SMART Lab and faculty offices. The third building is known as the Graduate Pavilion and has classrooms, study rooms, team rooms and offices for faculty. The second floor of the Undergraduate and Graduate Pavilions contains departmental offices for Management, Marketing, ISDS, Accounting, Economics and Finance, as well as Ph.D. suites. The fourth building is the auditorium. This two-story, 12,600 square foot building can seat 300 people and will be used by the Business School and the community. The second floor of the Auditorium has graduate classrooms and labs. Both Pavilions and the Auditorium connect through covered archways on the first floor and enclosed walkways on the second floor.

== Arts ==
Sunrise at the Rookery

The Business Education Complex is decorated with multiple pieces of art, all commissioned by LSU E. J. Ourso College alumnus Roger Ogden.

The Business Education Complex is home to a massive piece of art created specifically for it by renowned New Orleans–based artist Simon Gunning. Measuring five feet tall by 20 feet wide, “Sunrise at the Rookery”, is divided into five separate panels that together form a traditional Louisiana swamp scene that features indigenous flora and fauna.

Francis Pavy's “Louisiana Wetlands”, located in the Bert S. Turner Family Lobby of The Auditorium, is a harmony of images symbolic of the state's bayous, marshes and swamps. Featuring a wide array of colors and stenciled on elements, the five-foot tall, 20-foot wide piece was completed to commemorate the 200th anniversary of Louisiana's statehood.

The latest artistic addition, CELEBRATE, was dedicated October 29, 2013. CELEBRATE is a 20-foot tall, Corten steel sculpture with mirror finished stainless steel ends on each of the six geometric forms that comprise the work. The sculpture was created by artist Gary Slater.

== See also ==
- List of United States business school rankings
- List of business schools in the United States
