= Catherine Llorens-Cortes =

French pharmacologist (born 1954)

Catherine Llorens-Cortès
- Born: January 6, 1954 (age 72)
- Education: Pierre and Marie Curie University
- Scientific career
- Workplaces: INSERM; Collège de France
- Thesis: Localisation des sites de reconnaissance des endorphines sur les systemes catecholaminergiques cerebraux; leur role eventuel dans le developpement de la tolerance et de la dependance a la morphine (1978)

Catherine Llorens-Cortès (née Lepart; born January 6, 1954) is a French pharmacologist who is a Professor and Director of the Central Laboratory of Neuropeptides and Water and Cardiovascular Regulations at the Collège de France. Her research considers neuropharmacology and the development of new therapies for people with heart conditions. She was awarded the French Academy of Sciences Medal for Applications of Science in 2023.

== Early life and education ==
Llorens-Cortès was born in Saint-Germain-en-Laye. She was a doctoral researcher at the Pierre and Marie Curie University, where she studied endorphin recognition and response to morphine. After earning her doctorate she was appointed to a permanent research position at L'Institut national de la santé et de la recherche médicale (INSERM), where she eventually became research director.

== Research and career ==
Llorens-Cortès has been interested in biologically active peptides since the start of her career. She has mainly worked on enzymes that are involved with the degradation or activation of active peptides. In 2011, Llorens-Cortès integrated her laboratory into the Collège de France Interdisciplinary Center for Research in Biology. She developed endogenous morphines that were developed into an anti diarrhoea drug used in paediatrics. Her research considers new drugs for hypertension, hyponatremia and heart failure. She developed Firibastat, an aminopeptidase that can penetrate the brain, normalise blood pressure and improve cardiac function. Firibastat prevents left ventricular dysfunction and can improve cardiac function after myocardial infarction. Llorens-Cortès also discovered apelin analogs (e.g. LIT01-196) to treat hyponatremia. LIT01-196 activates the apelin receptor, which is important for moderating cardiovascular function.

In 2015, Llorens-Cortès co-founded Quantum Genomics, a pharmaceutical company that looks to develop new therapeutic targets for cardiovascular disease.

== Awards and honours ==
- 2002 Prize of the French Academy of Sciences
- 2012 Danièle Hermann Prize
- 2013 Legion of Honour
- 2014 Galien Price France
- 2021 International Society of Hypertension Honour for Senior Women Researchers
- 2021 Emilia Valori Prize
- 2022 Officier of the Legion of Honour
- 2023 French Academy of Sciences Medal for Applications of Science.

== Selected publications ==
- B P Roques; M C Fournié-Zaluski; E Soroca; J M Lecomte; B Malfroy; Catherine Llorens-Cortès; J C Schwartz (1 November 1980). "The enkephalinase inhibitor thiorphan shows antinociceptive activity in mice". Nature. 288 (5788): 286–288. doi:10.1038/288286a0. ISSN 1476-4687. PMID 7001254. Wikidata Q59063903.
- Zsolt Lenkei; Miklós Palkovits; Corvol P; Catherine Llorens-Cortès (1 October 1997). "Expression of angiotensin type-1 (AT1) and type-2 (AT2) receptor mRNAs in the adult rat brain: a functional neuroanatomical review". Frontiers in Neuroendocrinology. 18 (4): 383–439. doi:10.1006/frne.1997.0155. ISSN 0091-3022. PMID 9344632. Wikidata Q41621710.
- A Reaux; N De Mota; I Skultetyova; et al. (1 May 2001). "Physiological role of a novel neuropeptide, apelin, and its receptor in the rat brain". Journal of Neurochemistry. 77 (4): 1085–1096. doi:10.1046/j.1471-4159.2001.00320.x. ISSN 0022-3042. PMID 11359874. Wikidata Q30032204.
