= Lejeune Hall =

Building in Annapolis, Maryland, US

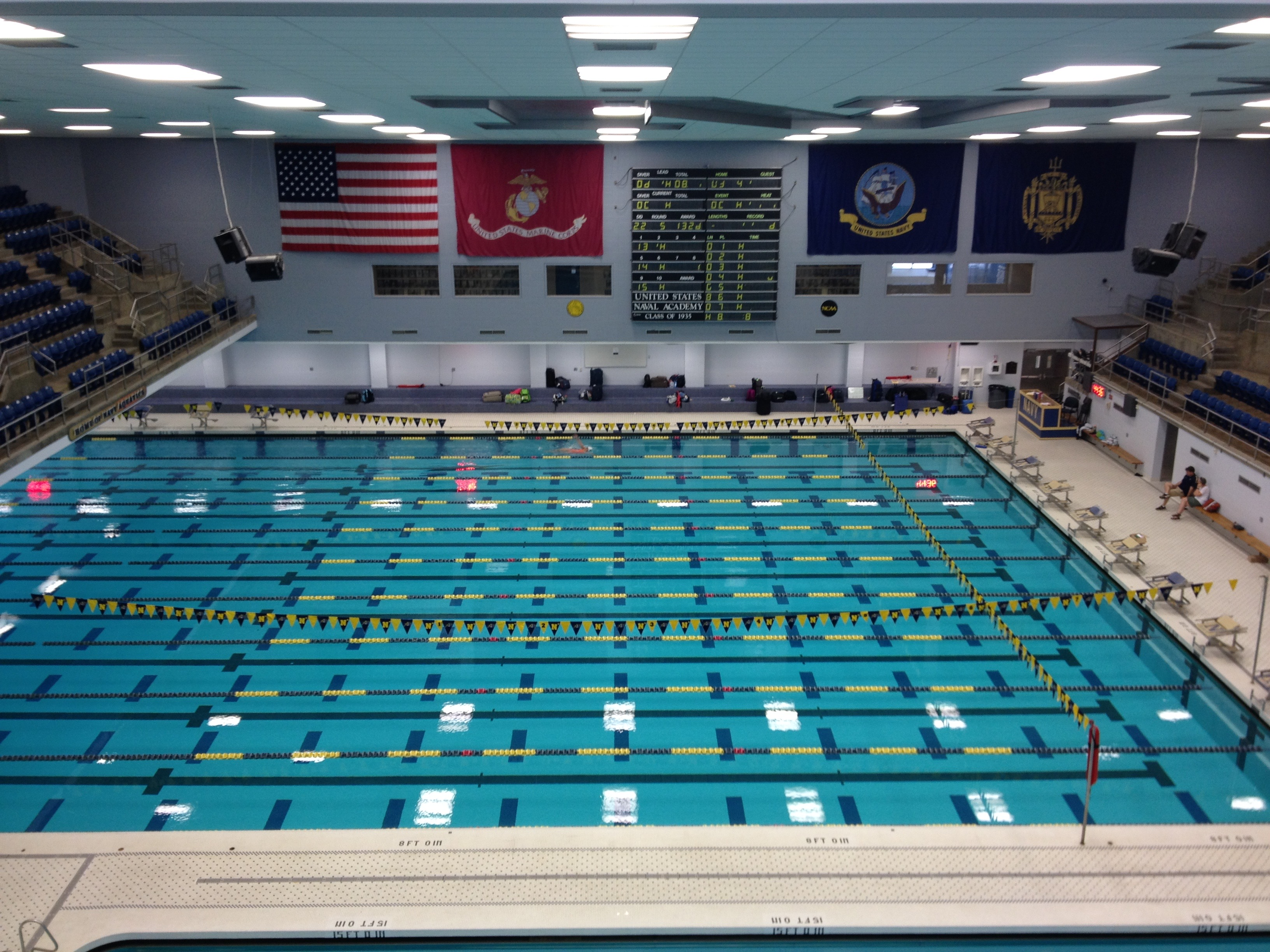

- Location within Maryland

General information
- Location: Annapolis, Maryland, United States
- Coordinates: 38.978707°N 76.483111°W
- Cost: $13.5 million
- Owner: United States Naval Academy
- Operator: United States Naval Academy

Lejeune Hall (sometimes called the Lejeune Physical Education Center) is a sports complex and arena at the United States Naval Academy in Annapolis, Maryland. It currently houses the academy's boxing and wrestling practice arena, and natatorium, and the Naval Academy's Athletic Hall of Fame.

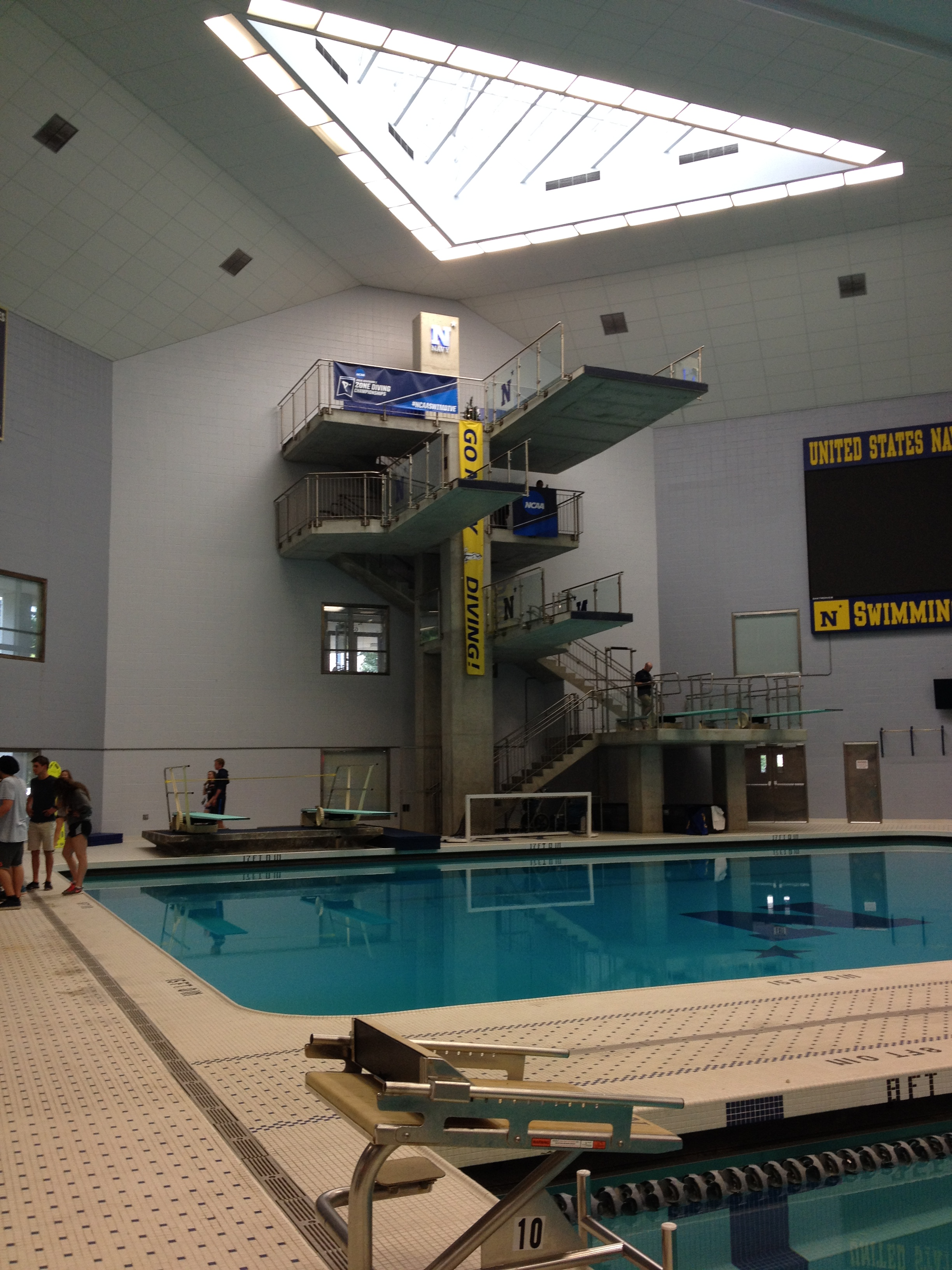
A picture of the Lejeune Hall Diving Well

== History ==
The Lejeune Hall was built in 1982 in honor of Lt. General John Archer Lejeune. The facility came with an aquatic natatorium which has an Olympic size pool (25m × 50m) and a diving well. The diving platforms vary from 10 metres (33 ft), 7.5 metres (25 ft), and 5 metres (16 ft). The Natatorium also has a few diving boards. In 2013, the Lejeune Hall underwent renovations where much of the flooring was redone and all the pools were also renovated with new tiles and new starting blocks.

== Features ==
The Lejeune Hall features a weight room, saunas, locker rooms and a classroom. In the natatorium, features included are 600 pullout seats for spectators and a large LED display scoreboard. Visitors touring the campus will be able to see the natatorium through glass windows outside.

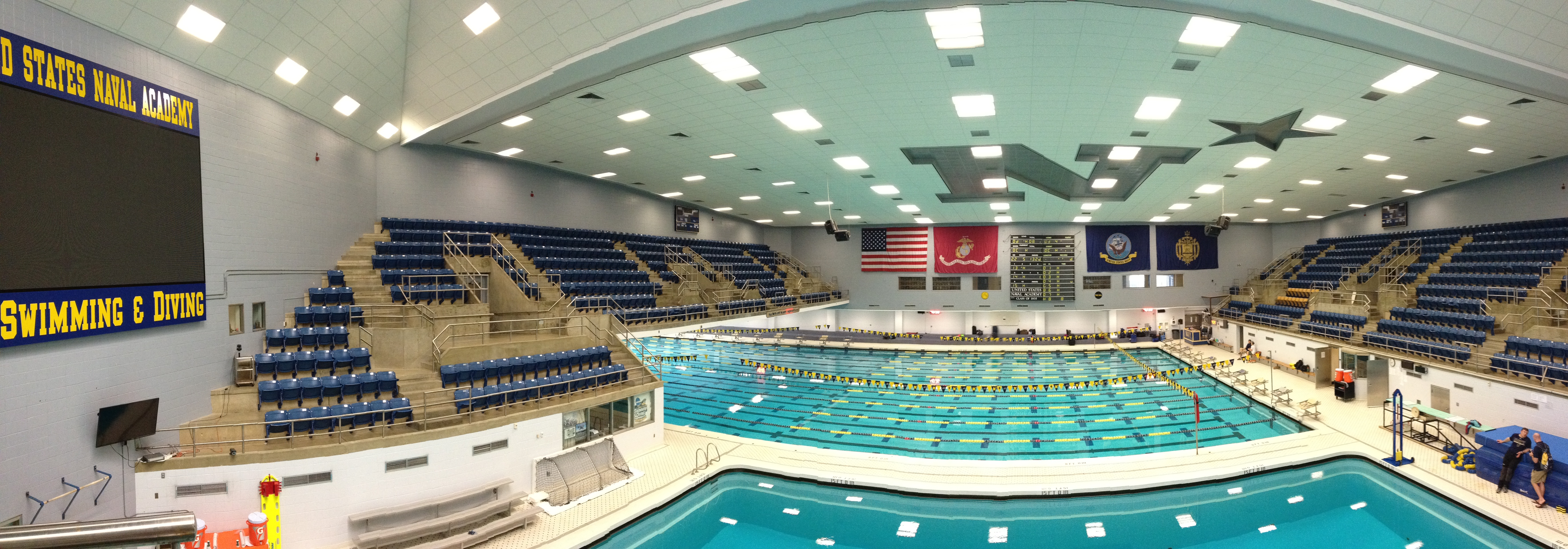
A panoramic shot of the Lejeune Hall natatorium

=== Memorials ===
The Lejeune Hall houses three memorials:

- Class of 1940 Memorial – A fountain outside the building dedicated to the alumni of the academy who lost their lives in World War II.
- Class of 1944 Memorial – A plaza and garden dedicated to the class of 1944.
- Class of 1950 Memorial – A large stone to remember Isherwood Hall which had been demolished in 1958.

== See also ==
- Navy Midshipmen Facilities
- United States Naval Academy § Halls and principal buildings
