= Aminopeptidase A inhibitor =

Drug class

Aminopeptidase A inhibitors are a class of antihypertensive drugs that work by inhibiting the conversion of angiotensin II to angiotensin III by the aminopeptidase A enzyme. The first medication in this class is firibastat. It is hypothesized that the drugs may be more effective in overweight people and those of African descent.
