= Geoffrey Broadbent =

Geoffrey Broadbent (11 June 1929 – 2020) was an English architect, academic and professor emeritus, and a prolific author in architectural theory, especially semiotics. He was head of the School of Architecture at Portsmouth Polytechnic (from 1992 University of Portsmouth), England, from 1967 until 1994, when he became professor emeritus. Among his best known works are the books Design in Architecture: Architecture and the Human Sciences (1973) and Emerging Concepts in Urban Space Design (1990). He was born in Huddersfield.

== Biography ==
=== Family, education and career ===
Broadbent was born on 11 June 1929 in Huddersfield, Yorkshire, England, son of Albert and Florence Broadbent. He studied architecture at the University of Manchester, completing his studies in 1955. He worked as an assistant architect at the architects firm of Fairhursts in Manchester in 1956-1959. His interests, however, lay more in academia; he was a lecturer in architecture at the University of Manchester in 1959-1961; lecturer at the Institute of Advanced Architectural Studies (IAAS) at the University of York in 1961-1962; and lecturer at the University of Sheffield in 1963-1967, before being made head of the School Architecture at Portsmouth Polytechnic in 1967, a position he held until 1994, when he became professor emeritus. Among the numerous positions he has held over his career, he was chairman of the Portsmouth Society in 1974-1988, a member of numerous committees (especially tied to education) in the Royal Institute of British Architects, the Royal Society of Arts, the Design Research Society, and the British School at Rome.

Geoffrey Broadbent was married to Anne Barbara Broadbent (deceased 1985), and they had two children, Mark John Broadbent and Antony James Broadbent. He married Gloria Camino Maldonado in 1991. Broadbent died in Portsmouth in 2020. An annual memorial lecture was founded in his honour, the first of which, titled "Thinking Architecture", was given on 17 November 2022, by Dr. Richard Bunt, who had been recruited by Broadbent to Portsmouth in the early 1980s, along with Spanish theorist Tomás Llorens as part of the teaching of architectural semiotics in the school of architecture. Following his death, Broadbent bequeathed his vast personal library to the Portsmouth School of Architecture.

== Work ==
Broadbent was one of a number of early theorists in architectural theory, along with others such as Christopher Alexander, who made strong links between architecture and the humanities and psychology and later, along with others such as Charles Jencks, in semiotics. His seminal book Design in Architecture: Architecture and the Human Sciences (1973) attempted to break down the architectural design process into its constituent parts. He posited four major phases in design activity; pragmatic, iconic, analogic and canonic. Reviewing the book in 1980, Bryan Lawson called it "essential reading for those interested in a kind of environmental design where, above all, people matter."

== Published books ==
- Design in Architecture. Architecture and the Human Sciences, London: John Wiley and Sons Inc., 1973.
- Neo-classicism: Schinkel, Johnson, Stirling, AD profile 23, Vol. 49, No 8-9, London: Academy Press, 1979.
- Meaning and Behaviour in the Built Environment, London: John Wiley, 1980
- Signs, Symbols and Architecture (with Richard Bunt and Charles Jencks), London: John Wiley & Sons Inc., 1980.
- Meaning and Behaviour in the Built Environment (with Richard Bunt and Tomas Llorens), Chichester: Wiley, 1980.
- Emerging Concepts in Urban Space Design, Brussels: Van Nostrand Reinhold, 1990.
- Tomás Taveira, London: John Wiley & Sons, 1991.
- Deconstruction: A Student Guide, London: Academy Press, 1991.
- Free Spirit in Architecture - Omnibus Volume (with Andreas Papadakis and Maggie Toy), London: Academy Press, 1992.
- "Architectural education", in M. Pearce & M. Toy (eds.), Educating Architects, London: Academy Editions, 1994.
- Eco-Architecture: Harmonisation Between Architecture And Nature (with C.A. Brebbia), Ashurst: WIT Press, 2006.
- Eco-Architecture II: Harmonisation Between Architecture and Nature (with C.A. Brebbia), Ashurst: WIT Press, 2008.
