= Taylor Energy =

Former American independent energy producer

- Company type: Private
- Industry: Oil drilling
- Founded: 1979
- Founder: Patrick F. Taylor
- Headquarters: New Orleans, Louisiana, United States
- Key people: Chief Executive Officer: Phyllis Taylor
- Products: Oil and gas
- Website: www.taylorenergy.com

Taylor Energy is an American oil company that is based in New Orleans, Louisiana that drilled for oil in the Gulf of Mexico. The company was founded on July 20, 1979 by Patrick F. Taylor. Following his death in 2004, his wife Phyllis Taylor assumed ownership and became the chairwoman and CEO—making her the wealthiest woman in Louisiana. As of November 2021, Phyllis Taylor remains the CEO of the company. Despite having been a relatively small producer, the company has attracted widespread attention for the Taylor oil spill, one of the largest oil spills in American history, and the longest ongoing oil spill as of June 2022.

== History ==
The company's founder, Patrick F. Taylor, grew up in Beaumont, Texas, and attended Louisiana State University. He married Phyllis Miller in 1965, who had grown up in Abbeville, Louisiana, and had been one of the first women to graduate from Tulane Law School.

Taylor Energy was first incorporated on July 20, 1979.

Circa February 1, 2008, Taylor Energy Company, one of the largest privately owned oil and gas companies operating in the Gulf of Mexico, agreed to sell all its energy assets to a joint venture between Korea National Oil Corporation and Samsung C&T Corporation. The MC20 wells which were and are still leaking, was not part of the sale. Despite this apparent sale, the company continues to be incorporated in New Orleans, retains its own brand, and has its own Chief Executive.

== 2004 Taylor Energy oil spill ==
In 2004, Hurricane Ivan knocked over a large oil platform operated by Taylor Energy, which began releasing oil into the Gulf of Mexico. This oil spill attracted little attention in subsequent years, partially a result of the company reporting that only a small amount of oil had been released. In 2013, the company partnered with a number of United States government organizations, including the U.S. Coast Guard, to release a report suggesting that the broken platform had only been releasing "about three gallons per day" of oil into the Gulf. These estimates have been disproven in multiple ways including the fact that U.S. Coast Guard contractor, Couvillion Group, has collected over a million gallons as of July 2022.

In 2015, the Associated Press reported on Taylor Energy's broken well, and noted that Taylor Energy had only one full-time employee in April 2015. By October 2018, the continuing spill was approaching the level of the 2010 Deepwater Horizon oil spill, the largest marine oil spill in the history of the petroleum industry.

In 2019, Taylor Energy went to court to stop the government's efforts to fix the leak, filing four lawsuits against the Interior Department, U.S. Coast Guard, and Couvillion Group. The Couvillion Group, a marine construction company based in Belle Chase, Louisiana, was hired by the government to recover and contain the spill in 2019; in April 2019, the company built an underwater containment system. In its first year of operation, the system retrieved around 400,000 gallons of oil; the Coast Guard considers a release of 100,000 gallons of oil in coastal waters a "spill of national significance." The company had collected over a million gallons of oil as of July 2022. The lawsuit against Couvillion Group by Taylor Energy for “trespassing” as they worked to contain the spill was dismissed by U.S. District Court Judge Greg G. Guidry on August 21, 2020.
