= Firibastat =

Chemical compound

Clinical data
- Other names: QGC-001

Legal status
- Legal status: Investigational

Identifiers
- IUPAC name: (3S,3′S)-4,4′-Disulfanediylbis(3-amino-1-butanesulfonic acid)
- CAS Number: 648927-86-0
- PubChem CID: 24851355
- DrugBank: DB13107
- ChemSpider: 30649361
- UNII: 638KY4573I
- ChEMBL: ChEMBL4297511

Chemical and physical data
- Formula: C_{8}H_{20}N_{2}O_{6}S_{4}
- Molar mass: 368.50 g·mol^{−1}
- 3D model (JSmol): Interactive image
- SMILES: C(CS(=O)(=O)O)[C@@H](CSSC[C@H](CCS(=O)(=O)O)N)N
- InChI: InChI=1S/C8H20N2O6S4/c9-7(1-3-19(11,12)13)5-17-18-6-8(10)2-4-20(14,15)16/h7-8H,1-6,9-10H2,(H,11,12,13)(H,14,15,16)/t7-,8-/m0/s1; Key:HJPXZXVKLGEMGP-YUMQZZPRSA-N

Firibastat is a prodrug of two brain aminopeptidase A inhibitors, developed to treat resistant hypertension. It failed to show efficacy in a Phase III trial.
