= Patrick F. Taylor =

American businessman

Patrick Filburt Taylor
- Born: June 12, 1937; Beaumont, Jefferson County; Texas, USA
- Died: November 6, 2004 (aged 67); New Orleans, Louisiana
- Resting place: Patrick F. Taylor Cemetery at Circle Bar Ranch in Foxworth in Marion County, Mississippi
- Education: The Kinkaid School; Louisiana State University
- Occupation: Petroleum businessman
- Political party: Republican
- Spouse: Phyllis Miller Taylor (married c. 1965-2004, his death)
- Children: Chris
- Parents: Alex Taylor; Sibyl Partin Taylor

Patrick F. Taylor (June 12, 1937 – November 6, 2004) was an American businessman, the founder and CEO of the independent oil company Taylor Energy Company.

== Taylor Opportunity Program for Students ==
Taylor had a strong interest in education and humanitarian causes. He developed and promoted the "Taylor Plan", adopted in Louisiana in 1998, which provides academically qualified students with state-paid tuition for college. The program is known as the Taylor Opportunity Program for Students, or TOPS. One of its co-authors was the Democratic state Representative Robby Carter of Greensburg in St. Helena Parish.

In 1998, TOPS paid the tuition for 24,163 students in the amount of $54 million. By the time of the 2014-15 academic year, the program assisted more than 50,000 students annually at a cost of nearly $270 million. Some 40 percent of that amount went to LSU in Baton Rouge. The cost is expected to soar beyond $300 million. Budget reductions at state universities have compelled those institutions to depend on tuition. LSU obtains some one-fifth of its operating budget from the state, counting TOPS, in contrast to 70 percent in 2006.

On May 1, 2017, the Louisiana House Appropriations Committee approved a 2017-18 budget that fully funds TOPS but with another $237 million in reductions to health care and in spending by two other agencies, Corrections and Children and Family Services. Committee chairman Cameron Henry of Metairie said that the panel would spend 97.5 percent of the amount projected because in recent years the Revenue Estimating Committee has projected that the state would collect more than it has done. That situation, he said, created multiple mid-budget deficits.

== Legacy ==
In 2004, Taylor was named No. 234 to the Forbes 400, a list compiled by Forbes magazine of the 400 richest Americans.

Two months before his death in 2004, one of Taylor Energy's oil platforms was knocked over due to an underwater mudslide caused by Hurricane Ivan. Due to inaction and inability to block the leaks, the Taylor Energy Spill has become the longest ongoing oil spill in United States and is one of the largest oil spills by volume in the Gulf of Mexico.

Taylor donated the statue of "Iron Mike" to the National Museum of the Marine Corps in Quantico, Virginia. Mrs. Taylor has also donated millions of dollars in contribution to new and improved schools.

Before his death in 2004, the Patrick F. Taylor Science and Technology Academy in Jefferson Parish, Louisiana, was named in his honor. Each year, the school celebrates Founder's Day to honor the man who gave so much to Louisiana education. Phyllis Taylor continues to play a close role with the school, which she often visits, takes part in graduation observances, and joins students on trips to the Alabama Shakespeare Festival.

In 2007, the building which hosts the majority of engineering classes at LSU was renamed in Taylor's honor.

In 2009, Taylor was posthumously inducted into the Louisiana Political Museum and Hall of Fame in Winnfield.

== Namesakes ==
- Patrick F. Taylor Science and Technology Academy
- Patrick F. Taylor Building on the LSU campus
- Patrick F. Taylor Hope Lodge
