= Carme Llorens Gilabert =

Catalan enameler and jeweller (1927–2020)

Carme Llorens i Gilabert (Barcelona, 1927 – 1 April 2020) was a Spanish Catalan enameler and jeweller.

Very young, Carme Llorens entered the arts and crafts school of Barcelona, the Escola Massana, where she studied between 1942 and 1950. She specialized in enamel on fire with Miquel Soldevila i Valls and, along with other Soldevila's disciples, took part in what has been known as the enameler Barcelona School (Escola de Barcelona d'esmalt). She returned later to pursue jewelry studies, and met there her husband, the painter Jordi Vila i Rufas, teacher on wooden painting at the same institution.

After leaving the Massana, Llorens developed her work as a professional enameler. During her long career her style evolved from the academicism of his early works to a progressive experimentation with diverse techniques and materials, with a growing work on material textures. She participated regularly in national and international fairs, in addition to numerous personal exhibitions. Her work, common in art galleries, is present at the Design Museum of Barcelona (Museu del Disseny de Barcelona, in Catalan) and the Contemporary Enamel Museum (Museu de l'Esmalt Contemporani, at Salou), as well as in several private art collections.

On 1 April 2020, it was announced that she died from COVID-19 during the firsts weeks of the pandemic in Spain. At the time of her death she was the dean of the Enamel Information and Diffusion Centre (Centre d'Informació i Difusió de l'Art de l'Esmalt, CIDAE, Barcelona).

== Bibliography ==
- Diccionario biográfico de artistas de Cataluña : desde la época romana hasta nuestros días dir. by J.F. Ráfols. Barcelona: Diccionario Ráfols, 1989.
- Carme Llorens: esmalts. Barcelona: CIDAE, 2010 (Saber fer).
- Jesús-Ángel Prieto Villanueva. La lluita pel reconeixement dels oficis artístics i l'Escola Massana de Barcelona: el cas dels esmalts, la ceràmica i la joieria, PhD, Barcelona: Universitat de Barcelona, May 2017.
