= Dave Llorens =

Founder and CEO of the solar financing aggregator 1BOG

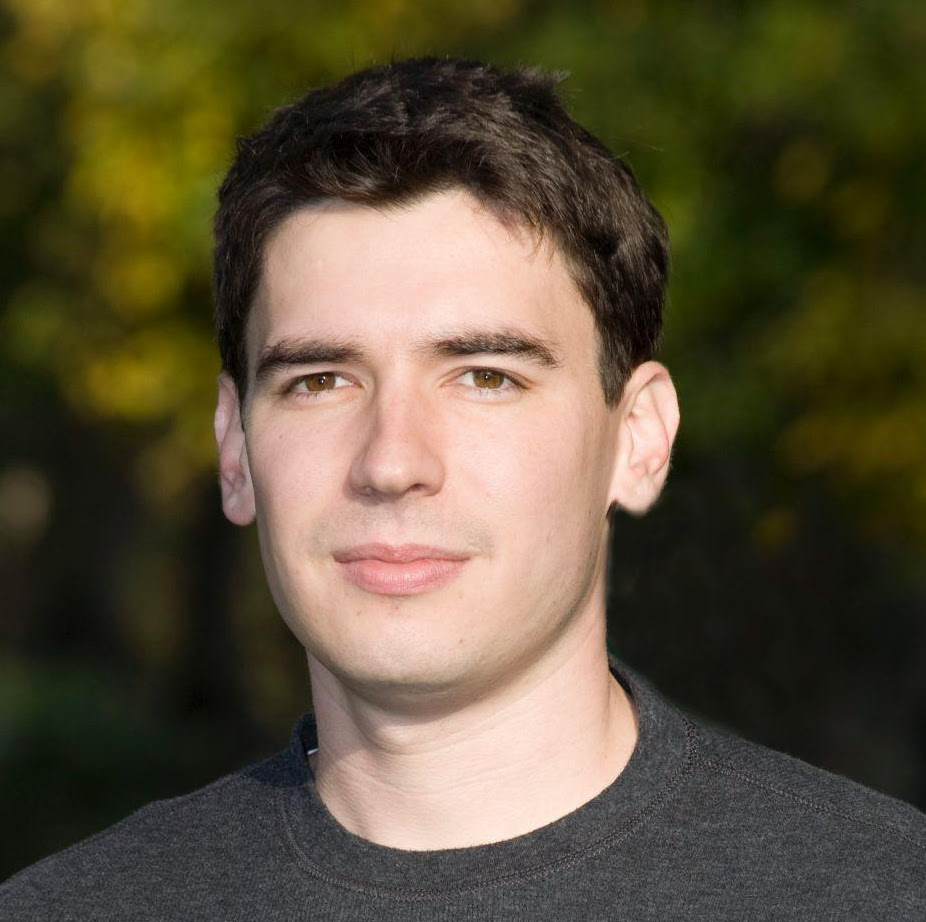
Dave Llorens, CEO of 1BOG

Dave Llorens is an American entrepreneur and the founder of the solar financing aggregator 1BOG (One Block Off the Grid), serving as its CEO from 2008 to 2012 before leaving due to personal reasons. The startup was notably featured in the 2010 documentary Carbon Nation. In 2009 the company accounted for a quarter of all solar installations in the San Francisco Bay area.

Llorens also started SolarPowerRocks.com, a website that consolidates information on solar grants and incentives by state, and co-founded 60-day MBA, an online entrepreneurial course.

== 1BOG ==
The company aims to put the cost of residential solar technology within the reach of more families and thereby increase the adoption of sustainable solar technology nationwide, mainly throughout San Francisco, California, and several other major urban centers. 1BOG, however, has historically faced several regulatory issues due to state-independent protocol for metering, permits and rebates. Llorens reported to The Wall Street Journal in a 2011 interview that solving this confusion was an ongoing mission for 1BOG.

"We serve as a conduit between the consumer companies, and finance companies in 40 states and growing," Llorens further elaborated in an interview with the Mother Nature Network. As another 1BOG executive told Venture Beat, their company aimed to provide solar systems as a cheap and affordable solution for the regular person through low upfront payments.

1BOG's industry model is an example of social entrepreneurship, in which a company discovers a way to make profit while promoting social activism and community development. It is a successful example of this model, making its money on economies of scale and payments from installers.

== See also ==
- American Solar Energy Society
- List of photovoltaics companies
- National Renewable Energy Laboratory
- Renewable energy in the United States
- Solar Energy Industries Association
