= Tomás Llorens =

Spanish art historian (1936–2021)

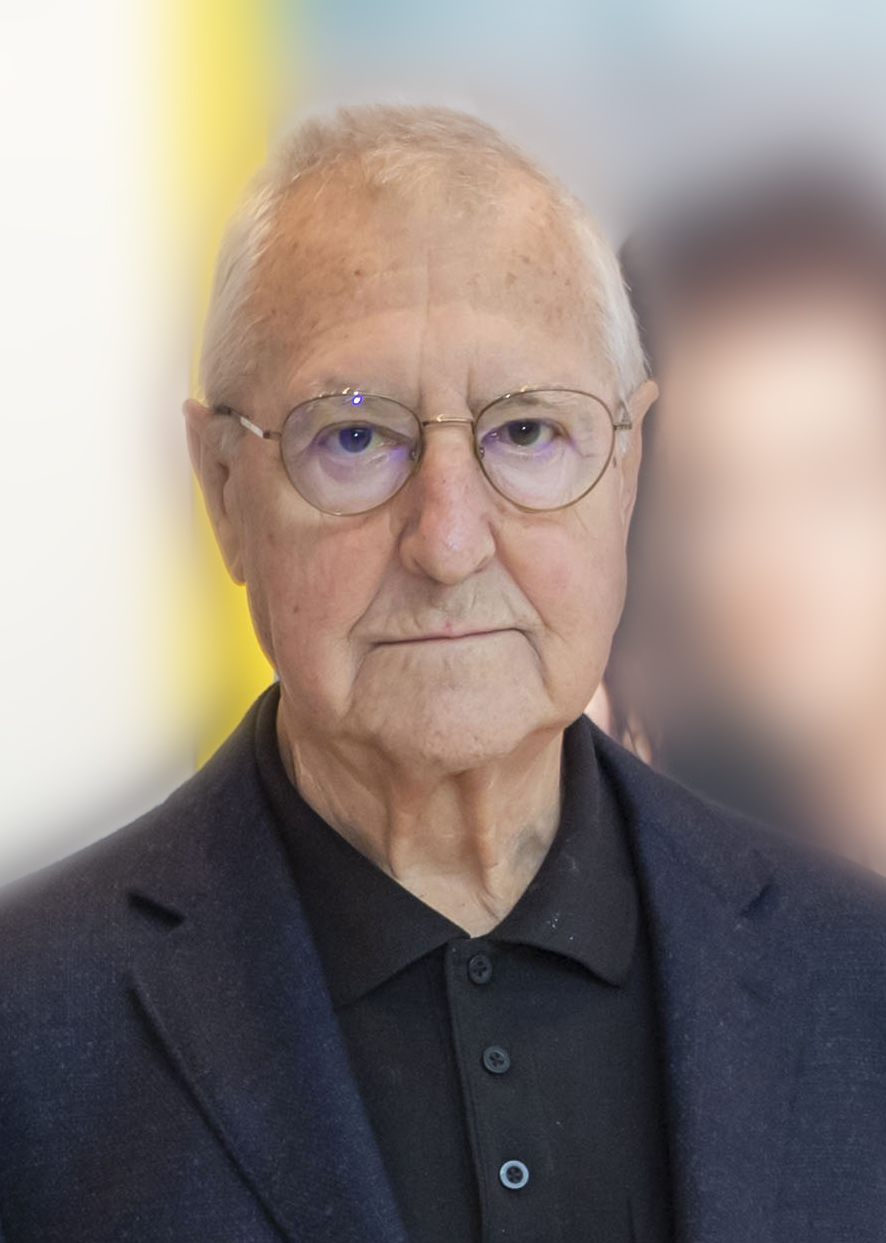

Tomás Llorens i Serra (4 October 1936 – 10 June 2021), was a Spanish art and architecture historian, museum director, curator, university professor, and art critic renowned for his work on art and architecture theory and aesthetics, especially regarding the 19th and early 20th centuries. He was director of the Institut Valencià d'Art Modern in Valencia in 1986–1988, director of the Reina Sofía Museum in Madrid in 1988–1990, and director of the Thyssen-Bornemisza Museum in Madrid in 1991–2005.

== Life and career ==
Llorens was born in Almassora, Valencian Community. He received a degree in law from the University of Madrid in 1958 and a degree in philosophy from the University of Valencia in 1964. From 1969 to 1972 he lectured on aesthetics at the School of Architecture of Valencia. He was imprisoned and expelled under the Franco fascist regime in 1972. That same year he left Spain with his family to live in England, where he was appointed a Research Fellow at Portsmouth Polytechnic School of Architecture, at the invitation of its head of Department, Geoffrey Broadbent. He remained at Portsmouth as a senior lecturer until 1986. At Broadbent’s instigation, the school taught architectural semiotics under Llorens and his colleague Richard Bunt, resulting in various publications, notably the book they edited together, Meaning and Behaviour in the Built Environment (1980). While still at Portsmouth, Llorens was a visiting lecturer at the Barcelona School of Architecture (UPC) in 1977–1980, at University College London in 1977–1981, and at the Central University of Venezuela in Caracas in 1979–1980, as well as a visiting lecturer in the history of art at the University of Girona in 1996-98. Llorens was a member of the editorial board of the Barcelona-based architectural journal Arquitecturas Bis, until it closed in 1985.

Llorens returned permanently to Spain in 1984, settling in the Valencian Country, where he took over as general director of Artistic Heritage at the Generalitat Valenciana. On his return to Spain, Llorens was behind the modernisation of many Spanish museums, particularly after he was appointed National Director of Fine Arts in 1986 by the then Spanish Minister of Culture, Javier Solana. He was one of the promoters of the Institut Valencià d'Art Modern (IVAM), of which he was its very first director between 1986 and 1988 – his contribution being crucial for the Julio González collection to be installed permanently in the museum. He was director of the Reina Sofía Museum in Madrid from 1988 to 1990: under his direction the museum built up a rich permanent collection of 20th century art by acquiring works by the great Spanish masters such as Pablo Picasso, Juan Gris and Joan Miró, who were until then, and for historical reasons, under-represented. From the mid-eighties Llorens was part of the Spanish Ministry of Culture team that negotiated with Baron Thyssen-Bornemizsa in the transfer of his artistic collection to Madrid. In 1991 he was appointed director of the Thyssen-Bornemisza Museum, a position he held until 2005.

In 2006, Llorens received the Gold Medal of Merit in the Fine Arts by the Spanish Ministry of Education, Culture and Sports. In 2013 he was named Doctor Honoris Causa by the University of Alicante. On 23 October 2020, Llorens was declared the “Favorite Son of Almassora”, his hometown, by unanimous vote of the people. Llorens died in Dénia on 10 June 2021. The president of the Valencian Government, Ximo Puig, announced the news during a session at the Valencian Courts and defined Llorens as "a great intellectual and a great Valencian".

== Selected edited books and writings ==
- Tomás Llorens (ed.), Arquitectura, historia y teoria de los signos: Symposium organizado por la Comision de Cultura del Colegio de Arquitectos de Cataluna y Baleares, Barcelona: Gaya Ciencia, 1972.
- Tomás Llorens, “Domestic characters and leap into the avant-garde”, Lotus International, No. 23, New York: Rizzoli, 1979.
- Tomás Llorens, "Notes for a Definition of Aesthetic Semiosis", in Seymour Chatman, Umberto Eco and Jean M. Klinkenberg (eds.), A Semiotic Landscape. Panorama sémiotique. Berlin, Boston: De Gruyter Mouton, 1979, pp. 313-317.
- Tomás Llorens, “Architecture as representation of nature”, Semiotics, 1980, pp. 307-317
- Geoffrey Broadbent, Richard Bunt and Tomás Llorens (eds), Meaning and Behaviour in the Built Environment. Chichester: Wiley, 1980.
- Tomás Llorens, “Manfredo Tafuri: Neo-avant-garde and history”, in Demetri Porphyrios (ed), On the Methodology of Architectural History, London: Architectural Design Profile, 51 6/7, 1981.
- Tomás Llorens, “Making History”, in Joan Ockman (ed), Architecture Criticism Ideology. New York: Princeton Architectural Press, 1985.
- Tomás Llorens, Guide to the Thyssen-Bornemisza Museum. Laura Suffield (trans.) (2nd ed.). Madrid: Lunwerg editores SA, 1998.
- Tomás Llorens and Felipe Garín (eds), Fortuny e la pittura preziosista Spagnola. Madrid: Museo Thyssen-Bornemisza, 1998.
- Tomás Llorens (ed.), Kupka: Localización de móviles gráficos, 1912-1913. Madrid: Fundación Colección Thyssen-Bornemisza, 1998.
- Tomás Llorens, Juan Manuel Bonet, and Marilena Pasquali (eds), Morandi: exposición antológica. Madrid: Museo Thyssen-Bornemisza, 1999.
- Tomás Llorens (ed.), Nacimiento y desintegración del cubismo: Apollinaire y Picasso. Pamplona: Universidad de Navarra, 2001.
- Valeriano Bozal, Tomás Llorens and José Francisco Yvars (eds), Forma. El ideal clásico en el Arte Moderno. Madrid: Museo Thyssen-Bornemisza, 2001.
- Tomás Llorens (ed.), Mimesis, realismos modernos 1918-45. Madrid: Fundacion Coleccion Thyssen-Bornemisza, 2005.
- Yolande Clergue, Dominique Serena-Allier and Tomás Llorens (eds), Pablo Picasso: Portraits d'Arlésiennes 1912-1958. Ouvrage collectif, Actes Sud, 2005.
- Tomás Llorens (ed.), Peintres de la lumière Sargent / Sorolla. Paris: Ouvrage collectif, éditeur Association Paris-Musées, 2007.
- Tomás Llorens and Didier Ottinger (eds), Edward Hopper. Paris: D.A.P./Réunion des Musées Nationaux - Grand Palais, 2012
- Abigail McEwen, Tomás Llorens, Frederic Tuten (eds), The Worlds of Joaquín Torres-García. New York: Rizzoli, 2018

== Studies on his work ==
- Oihana Robador Ausejo, “Forma. El ideal clásico en el arte moderno”. Revisiones, núm. 01, Pamplona, 2005.
