= Taylor Energy oil spill =

Oil spill off the coast of Louisiana in the Gulf of Mexico

- Louisiana showing spill site relative to the Mississippi delta Location of the Taylor oil spill, off the southeast coast of Louisiana
- Interactive map of Taylor Energy oil spill
- Location: Gulf of Mexico
- Coordinates: 28°56′09″N 88°58′12″W
- Date: 2004 – 2019

Cause
- Cause: Hurricane
- Casualties: none
- Operator: Taylor Energy

Spill characteristics
- Volume: Currently collecting approximately 1,000 US gallons (3,800 L) a day
- Area: 8 square miles (21 km^{2})
- Shoreline impacted: Gulf Coast of the United States

The 2004 Taylor Energy oil spill is an ongoing spill located in the Gulf of Mexico, around 11 miles (18 km) off the coast of the U.S. state of Louisiana. It is the result of the destruction of a Taylor Energy oil platform during Hurricane Ivan in 2004. It is the longest-running oil spill in U.S. history. It was first brought to public attention when contamination at the site was noticed in 2010 by those monitoring the nearby Deepwater Horizon oil spill. A report by the Associated Press in 2015 challenged the estimates of the extent of the leak originally given by the company and the U.S. Coast Guard (USCG), which were then revised to be around 1,000 times greater than initially reported.

Upper estimates of the spill have been calculated to be as much as 140,000,000 US gallons (530,000,000 L; 120,000,000 imp gal), or about 3,333,300 barrels of oil lost over the life of the disaster, and affecting an area as large as 8 square miles (21 km^{2}). As of late 2019, it was estimated between nine and 108 barrels per day are being spilled, making it one of the worst modern oil spills in the Gulf of Mexico by volume. Since 2019, Couvillion Group, retained by the USCG after a national RFP (Request for Proposal) process, has been capturing approximately 1,000 US gallons (3,800 L) per day. The reserves are likely sufficient for the spill to continue for more than 100 years if not further contained.

Taylor Energy claims to have spent as much as $435 million decommissioning the site, and that nothing further can be done to contain the spill. They further state that current observations of oil plumes in the area are the result of contaminated sediments, and not an active spill. These claims have been disputed by non-profit groups, the press and government officials based on the actual volume of oil currently being safely captured by Couvillion Group.

In 2019, the U.S. Coast Guard and private contractors finally began to contain the majority of the leaking oil, but after 16 years of uncontrolled leakage, the Taylor spill has become the nation's longest continuous oil spill.

== Origin ==
=== Taylor Energy oil platform MC20 ===
Taylor took over an oil-production platform once operated by BP in 1995. The Taylor Energy Mississippi Canyon 20 site (Note: The site is alternatively referred to as "Taylor Energy platform 23051".) was constructed in 1984, 11 miles (18 km) southeast of the Plaquemines-Balize Delta and 12 miles off the Louisiana coast. It comprised a "fixed, eight-pile structure" in 490 feet (150 m) deep water, with 28 active and semi-active wells reaching reservoirs up to 2.08 miles (3.35 km) deep.

=== Hurricane Ivan and Gulf storms ===
On September 16, 2004, the eye of Hurricane Ivan passed within 62 miles (100 km) of the site, generating 145 mph winds and waves of roughly 70 to 80 feet high. The storm caused underwater landslides that capsized the oil rig and moved it 560 feet (170 m) from its original anchorage. The result was 25 – 28 leaking well heads buried beneath the sea floor at approximately 475 feet (145 m) below the surface. At the moment of capsizing, more than 600 barrels of crude oil, each containing 42 US gallons (160 L), tumbled into the Gulf. The rig, leaking oil, was buried in 150 feet of mud.

=== Public awareness ===
According to The Washington Post, although Taylor Energy reported the spill to the USCG at the time, The Coast Guard "...monitored the site for more than half a decade without making the public fully aware..." of the severity of the leak. For six years, Taylor Energy secretly repeated attempts to cap the leaks and failed over and over. Because no people died from the accident and because there was no immediate and obvious impact on surrounding ecosystems, Taylor Energy and the government managed to keep the disaster completely secret from the public. Increased attention came in 2010, when observers monitoring the Deepwater Horizon oil spill discovered a persistent oil slick at the Taylor site.

The Louisiana Environmental Action Network and several other conservationist organizations sued Taylor Energy in 2012, alleging that they, along with the federal government, had withheld information from the public in a way that was "inconsistent with national policy," specifically a provision of the Clean Water Act, which mandates "public participation in the ... enforcement of any regulation."

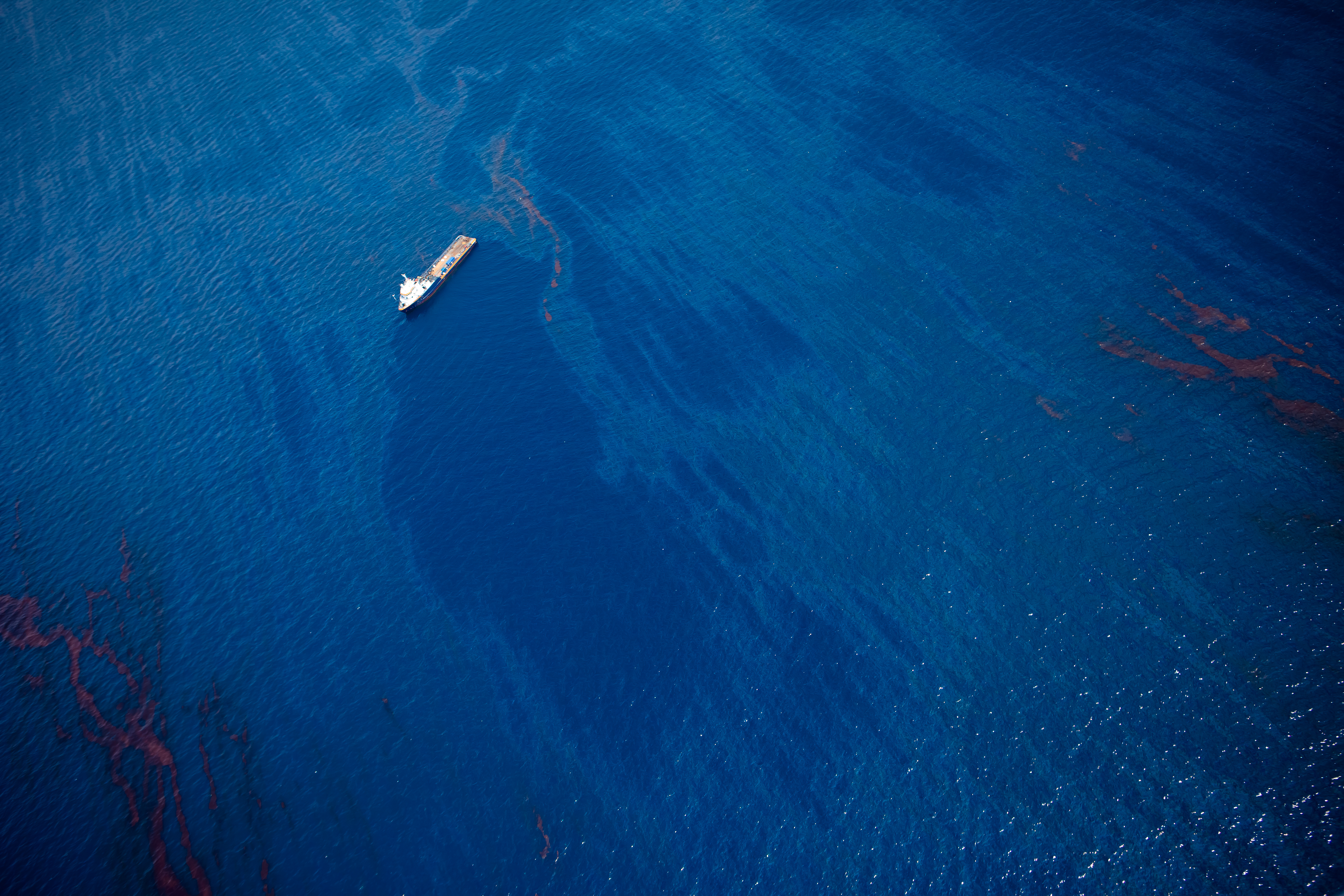
Oil sheen from the nearby Deepwater Horizon oil spill that occurred in 2010. Crews monitoring the area observed a similar contamination profile coming from the old Taylor Energy site. As of 2014, the sheen was approximately 1.5 miles (2.4 km) wide and 14 miles (23 km) long, with an average of 1 mile (1.6 km) wide and 5.5 miles (8.9 km) long.

In 2015, the Associated Press conducted an investigation into the spill, and when provided with the results, the U.S. Coast Guard updated their leak estimates to one that was "about 20 times greater than one recently touted by the company. Additional information regarding the spill has been withheld by the company, with the approval of the government, in the "name of protecting trade secrets." As of 2018, the National Oceanic and Atmospheric Administration (NOAA) was three years behind the deadline for producing a study of the environmental impacts of the spill. In July 2018, the non-profit Earthjustice filed a lawsuit against NOAA for "...failing to produce a timely study." As of 2018, no economic impact analysis of the spill had been conducted.

== Magnitude ==
As of October 2018, it was estimated that between 300 and 700 barrels of oil per day were being spilled near the Taylor Energy site. In May 2019, the U.S. Coast Guard installed a containment system that has been collecting 30 barrels per day. As of June 2019, a report by the National Center for Coastal Ocean Science estimated that the flow rate of oil leaking at the site was between 9 and 108 barrels per day. The resulting oil sheen was estimated in 2015 to cover 8 square miles (21 km^{2}). As of 2014, the sheen was approximately 1.5 miles (2.4 km) wide and 14 miles (23 km) long, with an average of 1 mile (1.6 km) wide and 5.5 miles (8.9 km) long.

Estimates by the environmental non-profit group SkyTruth indicated that as of 2015, that the spill may have emptied up to 1,400,000 US gallons (5,300,000 L; 1,200,000 imp gal) of oil, then making it the eighth largest spill in the Gulf of Mexico since 1970. Taylor Energy originally estimated the volume of the spill was in decline and was set to dwindle to around 12 US gallons (45 L) per day, but after an examination of 2,300 pollution reports by the Associated Press, the spill was presumed to be dramatically increasing in both volume and area. The spill continues at a rate of approximately 1,000 US gallons (3,800 L) a day which areis being collected subsea by The Couvillion Group. As of June 2022, the Taylor MC20 spill is the longest-running and second largest in US history.

According to Greenpeace and the Bureau of Safety and Environmental Enforcement (BSEE), if not contained, the tapped reserves contain sufficient oil for the spill to continue beyond 2100 before the site would be depleted. According to a 2008 report from the USCG, the leak represented a "...significant threat..." to the surrounding environment, although they did not find evidence that oil from the spill had reached the nearby shoreline.

In documents submitted to the United States District Court for the Eastern District of Louisiana in 2015, Taylor Energy contended that "there is no evidence to suggest that any wells are leaking," but that a "small residual sheen persists as the result of soil contamination that cannot safely and feasibly be addressed." However, the U.S. government reports concluded that "oil is most likely emanating from one or more of the 25 wells ... because the discharge volume is greater than can reasonably be accounted for by oil released from sediment only."

== Containment efforts ==
In 2008, Taylor Energy entered into an agreement with the Minerals Management Service to decommission the site, and the USCG established a dedicated multi-agency unified command structure to complete and oversee the work. Although the Minerals Management Service had ordered Taylor Energy to complete decommissioning by June 2008, they failed to do so, claiming "...the technology needed to plug the wells at the site did not yet—and still does not—exist..."

Taylor Energy reached an agreement with the federal government to establish a $666 million trust to fund a response to the spill. The Huffington Post reported that Taylor Energy has spent "tens of millions of dollars" in containment efforts. However, Taylor Energy contends that "nothing can be done to completely halt the chronic slicks..." According to the Bureau of Safety and Environmental Enforcement, collaborative efforts have resulted in the removal of the platform deck, removal of subsea debris, decommissioning of the oil pipeline, and efforts to plug nine of the affected wells, (Note: The wells that have had efforts made to plug include: well numbers 1, 4, 10, 11, 13, 16, 17, 19, and 21) but that, despite these efforts, there is ongoing oil discharge from the site.

Containment efforts were disrupted by Hurricane Katrina and Hurricane Rita, and although Taylor Energy formulated plans to resolve the issue and presented these plans to federal regulators, the details were not released to the public. Taylor Energy sold its remaining oil assets to Korea National Oil Corporation and Samsung C&T Corporation in 2008, and as of 2015 had only a single employee and one leaking platform with 28 wells.

On October 23, 2018, one day after a Washington Post article exposing a decade of lax enforcement, the USCG issued an order requiring cleanup of the site and blockage of the leaks; otherwise, Taylor Energy would face fines of $40,000 a day.

The United States Coast Guard, under Captain Christi Luttrell, issues a nationwide RFP to contain the MC20 spill in 2018. This RFP resulted in the creation of a working containment system by Couvillion Group, the selected contractor.

On May 16, 2019, the USCG reported that Couvillion Group's containment system was working well enough to reduce the heavy surface sheen to barely visible, as it was collecting approximately 1,000 US gallons (3,800 L) per day.

== Consequences ==
=== Environmental impact ===
As of 2018, the National Oceanic and Atmospheric Administration (NOAA) was three years behind the deadline for producing a study of the environmental impacts of the spill. In July 2018, the non-profit Earthjustice filed a lawsuit against NOAA for "failing to produce a timely study." As of 2018, no economic impact analysis of the spill had been conducted.

According to University of Miami marine biologist Robert Jones, some species, namely benthic invertebrates, are unable to move from the site of a prolonged oil release and are, thus, likely to suffer the most from a spill; he also claims that smaller organisms are typically impacted to a greater extent than larger organisms in cases of oil spills. According to Jones, it is impossible to know how long it will take for marine life to recover because to determine the recovery of the relevant sea life, the pre-spill conditions must be known so post-spill conditions can be measured in comparison. Furthermore, determining recovery also depends on which organisms are being considered because different organisms will recover at different paces. Jones points out a problem with the varying recovery paces of the affected organisms: "...differences in recovery rates may lead to unbalanced ecosystems with consequences for some species even if these species were not directly impacted by the spill itself. However, considering past spills, recovery can, in some cases, take decades."

=== Human health impacts ===
In addition to environmental concerns, there is also concern about the oil spill having negative consequences on human health. Research on the effects of the Taylor oil spill on marine life has determined that fish tend not to accumulate the harmful chemicals found in oil to the extent that it poses a risk to the health of humans consuming the fish. However, the research notes that this is not true for all invertebrates in the area. In other words, some sea life may accumulate harmful chemicals from the oil spill and thereby pose a risk to human health.

=== Economic impacts ===
As of 2018, there has been no economic impact analysis conducted to investigate the value of oil leaking into the sea and the potential loss of taxpayer dollars. As of 2019, studies focused more on economic opportunities, such as how jobs can be created by the oil companies that work with local communities to clean up hazardous spills. Oil is still being collected and sold from the Gulf in cleanup efforts from the Taylor spill, and the oil and gas industry continues to experience bankruptcies resulting in tens of thousands of Louisiana oil and gas workers becoming unemployed. With that said, these unemployed but knowledgeable oil and gas workers could be employed again to evaluate and tend to current oil infrastructure that might decay and become faulty over time. Ultimately, cleaning oil out of the Gulf of Mexico could actually be well-paid work for those who need it. The policy framework for this idea is still quite underdeveloped, however.

== Legal aspects and lawsuits ==
Environmentalists took Taylor Energy to court for engaging in a “secret deal” with the federal government that did not adhere to national policies that state that, in the event of a hazardous spill, citizen participation will be provided, encouraged, and assisted. According to the lawsuit, Taylor Energy, in agreement with the U.S. Coast Guard, purposefully neglected its obligation to adhere to the aforementioned policy when it chose to hide the spill from the public. In fact, in 2009, a private company testing fish in the area of the spill confirmed that there was an “acceptable risk” to humans, should they consume the fish, yet Taylor Energy still neglected to make the public aware of the spill.

In accordance with the law, there is a mandatory fine for not reporting a hazardous spill, but there is no fine for lying about the extent of a spill. This is precisely what Taylor Energy did; in 2015, an Associated Press investigation determined that Taylor Energy had been downplaying the extent of the spill, claiming that only about 2 US gallons (7.6 L) a day were leaking into the Gulf, when in fact it was nearly 90 US gallons (340 L) a day. That number has been further updated to approximately 1,000 US gallons (3,800 L) a day by the verified receipt of oil being captured daily by Couvillion Group.

At a 2016 public forum Taylor Energy's President William Pecue, argued that his company should be allowed to walk away from its obligation to clean up the oil spill in the Gulf. A third of the company's $666 million trust money had been spent on cleanup, but only about a third of the leaking wells had been fixed. Pecue's goal was to recover $450 million, arguing the spill could not be contained and that the disaster was no one's fault because the company had no control over Hurricane Ivan. He claimed: “I can affirmatively say that we do believe this was an act of God under the legal definition.” However, according to NOAA, Hurricane Ivan was one of the hundreds of hurricanes tracked in the Gulf since the 1800s.

Taylor Energy's lawsuit attempting to recover this money was dismissed in 2021, as the lawsuit did not allow the utilization of the Taylor fund. The consent decree reached by US Government and TEC turned over that money. The lawsuit against Timmy Couvillion and The Couvillion Group for "trespassing" was also dismissed and the contractor continues to capture oil that would otherwise enter Gulf of Mexico waters as of April 2022.

== See also ==
- Anthropogenic hazard
- History of the petroleum industry in the United States
- List of oil spills
- Offshore oil and gas in the Gulf of Mexico (United States)
- Petroleum seep
