= List of state highways in Louisiana (1000–1049) =

The following is a list of state highways in the U.S. state of Louisiana designated in the 1000–1049 range.

== Louisiana Highway 1000 ==
Louisiana Highway 1000
- Location: Assumption Parish
- Length: 2.921 mi (4.701 km)
- Existed: 1955–present

Louisiana Highway 1000 (LA 1000) runs 2.92 miles (4.70 km) in an east–west direction from LA 996 south of Bruly St. Martin to LA 1 north of Paincourtville.

The entire route is in Assumption Parish.

mi	km	Destinations	Notes
0.000	0.000	LA 996	Western terminus
0.320	0.515	LA 1001	Southern terminus of LA 1001
2.921	4.701	LA 1 – Donaldsonville, Napoleonville	Eastern terminus
1.000 mi = 1.609 km; 1.000 km = 0.621 mi

== Louisiana Highway 1001 ==
Louisiana Highway 1001
- Location: Bruly St. Martin
- Length: 0.880 mi (1,416 m)
- Existed: 1955–present

Louisiana Highway 1001 (LA 1001) runs 0.88 miles (1.42 km) in a general southeast to northwest direction along Dugas Road from LA 1000 southeast of Bruly St. Martin to LA 996 at Bruly St. Martin.

The entire highway is in Assumption Parish.

Location	mi	km	Destinations	Notes
	0.000	0.000	LA 1000	Southern terminus
Bruly St. Martin	0.880	1.416	LA 996	Northern terminus
1.000 mi = 1.609 km; 1.000 km = 0.621 mi

== Louisiana Highway 1002 ==
Louisiana Highway 1002
- Location: Assumption Parish
- Length: 1.7 mi (2.7 km)
- Existed: 1955–1993

Louisiana Highway 1002 (LA 1002) ran 1.7 miles (2.7 km) in an east–west direction from LA 1000 to LA 1 north of Paincourtville.

The entire route was in Assumption Parish.

mi	km	Destinations	Notes
0.0	0.0	LA 1000	Western terminus
1.7	2.7	LA 1 – Donaldsonville, Napoleonville	Eastern terminus
1.000 mi = 1.609 km; 1.000 km = 0.621 mi

== Louisiana Highway 1003 ==
Louisiana Highway 1003
- Location: Assumption Parish
- Length: 2.145 mi (3.452 km)
- Existed: 1955–present

Louisiana Highway 1003 (LA 1003) runs 2.15 miles (3.46 km) in a general southwest to northeast direction from LA 70 north of Paincourtville to LA 1 in Klotzville.

The entire highway is in Assumption Parish.

Location	mi	km	Destinations	Notes
	0.000	0.000	LA 70 (Pierre Part Road) – Paincourtville, Pierre Part	Southern terminus
Klotzville	2.145	3.452	LA 1 – Donaldsonville, Napoleonville	Northern terminus
1.000 mi = 1.609 km; 1.000 km = 0.621 mi

== Louisiana Highway 1004 ==
Louisiana Highway 1004
- Location: Assumption Parish
- Length: 2.958 mi (4.760 km)
- Existed: 1955–present

Louisiana Highway 1004 (LA 1004) runs 2.96 miles (4.76 km) in a north–south direction from LA 403 north of Brusle St. Vincent to LA 70 northwest of Paincourtville.

The entire highway is in Assumption Parish.

Location	mi	km	Destinations	Notes
	0.000	0.000	LA 403	Southern terminus
Westfield	1.627	2.618	LA 1005	Western terminus of LA 1005
	2.958	4.760	LA 70 (Pierre Part Road) – Paincourtville, Pierre Part	Northern terminus
1.000 mi = 1.609 km; 1.000 km = 0.621 mi

== Louisiana Highway 1005 ==
Louisiana Highway 1005
- Location: Westfield–Paincourtville
- Length: 1.579 mi (2.541 km)
- Existed: 1955–present

Louisiana Highway 1005 (LA 1005) runs 1.58 miles (2.54 km) in a southwest to northeast direction from LA 1004 at Westfield to LA 1 in Paincourtville.

The entire highway is in Assumption Parish.

Location	mi	km	Destinations	Notes
Westfield	0.000	0.000	LA 1004	Western terminus
Paincourtville	1.579	2.541	LA 1 – Napoleonville, Donaldsonville	Eastern terminus
1.000 mi = 1.609 km; 1.000 km = 0.621 mi

== Louisiana Highway 1006 ==
Louisiana Highway 1006
- Location: Assumption Parish
- Length: 3.556 mi (5.723 km)
- Existed: 1955–present

Louisiana Highway 1006 (LA 1006) runs 3.56 miles (5.73 km) in a north–south direction from LA 401 southwest of Napoleonville to LA 402 east of Brusle St. Vincent.

The entire highway is in Assumption Parish.

Location	mi	km	Destinations	Notes
	0.000	0.000	LA 401 – Napoleonville, Attakapas Landing	Southern terminus
	1.537	2.474	LA 1008	Western terminus of LA 1008
Glenwood	2.802	4.509	LA 1007 (Glenwood Road)	Western terminus of LA 1007
	3.556	5.723	LA 402	Northern terminus
1.000 mi = 1.609 km; 1.000 km = 0.621 mi

== Louisiana Highway 1007 ==
Louisiana Highway 1007
- Location: Glenwood
- Length: 0.908 mi (1,461 m)
- Existed: 1955–present

Louisiana Highway 1007 (LA 1007) runs 0.91 miles (1.46 km) in an east–west direction along Glenwood Road from LA 1006 at Glenwood to LA 1 north of Napoleonville.

The entire highway is in Assumption Parish.

Location	mi	km	Destinations	Notes
Glenwood	0.000	0.000	LA 1006	Western terminus
	0.908	1.461	LA 1 – Napoleonville, Donaldsonville	Eastern terminus
1.000 mi = 1.609 km; 1.000 km = 0.621 mi

== Louisiana Highway 1008 ==
Louisiana Highway 1008
- Location: Napoleonville
- Length: 1.157 mi (1.862 km)
- Existed: 1955–present

Louisiana Highway 1008 (LA 1008) runs 1.16 miles (1.87 km) in a southwest to northeast direction from LA 1006 east of Elm Hall to LA 308 east of Napoleonville.

The entire highway is in Assumption Parish.

Location	mi	km	Destinations	Notes
	0.000	0.000	LA 1006	Western terminus
Napoleonville	0.914	1.471	LA 1 north – Donaldsonville, Thibodaux	West end of LA 1 concurrency
Napoleonville	1.074	1.728	LA 1 south – Donaldsonville, Thibodaux	East end of LA 1 concurrency
Napoleonville	1.084– 1.129	1.745– 1.817	Bridge over Bayou Lafourche	
	1.157	1.862	LA 308	Eastern terminus
1.000 mi = 1.609 km; 1.000 km = 0.621 mi: Concurrency terminus

== Louisiana Highway 1009 ==
Louisiana Highway 1009
- Location: Assumption Parish
- Length: 2.2 mi (3.5 km)
- Existed: 1955–1991

Louisiana Highway 1009 (LA 1009) ran 2.2 miles (3.5 km) in an east–west direction from the junction of two local roads at Cancienne to LA 1 south of Napoleonville.

The entire highway was in Assumption Parish.

Location	mi	km	Destinations	Notes
Cancienne	0.0	0.0	Begin state maintenance at junction of Wildwood Road and Hardtime Road	Western terminus
	2.2	3.5	LA 1 – Napoleonville, Thibodaux	Eastern terminus
1.000 mi = 1.609 km; 1.000 km = 0.621 mi

== Louisiana Highway 1010 ==
Louisiana Highway 1010
- Location: Assumption Parish
- Length: 9.485 mi (15.265 km)
- Existed: 1955–present

Louisiana Highway 1010 (LA 1010) runs 9.49 miles (15.27 km) in a general north–south direction from LA 398 south of Labadieville to LA 308 southeast of Napoleonville.

The entire highway is in Assumption Parish.

Location	mi	km	Destinations	Notes
	0.000	0.000	LA 398	Southern terminus
Brule	0.972	1.564	LA 1247 – Labadieville	Southern terminus of LA 1247
	3.599	5.792	LA 1011 (Supreme Road)	
Percle	5.304	8.536	LA 400	
	9.061	14.582	LA 1 south – Thibodaux	South end of LA 1 concurrency
	9.381	15.097	LA 1 north – Napoleonville	North end of LA 1 concurrency
	9.406– 9.447	15.137– 15.203	Bridge over Bayou Lafourche	
	9.485	15.265	LA 308	Northern terminus
1.000 mi = 1.609 km; 1.000 km = 0.621 mi: Concurrency terminus

== Louisiana Highway 1011 ==
Louisiana Highway 1011
- Location: Assumption Parish
- Length: 6.341 mi (10.205 km)
- Existed: 1955–present

Louisiana Highway 1011 (LA 1011) runs 6.34 miles (10.20 km) in a general east–west direction from LA 400 northeast of Attakapas Landing to LA 308 east of Supreme.

The entire highway is in Assumption Parish.

Location	mi	km	Destinations	Notes
	0.000	0.000	LA 400	Western terminus
	2.376	3.824	LA 1012	Northern terminus of LA 1012
	4.816	7.751	LA 1010	
Supreme	6.243	10.047	LA 1 – Napoleonville, Thibodaux	
Supreme	6.262– 6.313	10.078– 10.160	Bridge over Bayou Lafourche	
	6.341	10.205	LA 308	Eastern terminus
1.000 mi = 1.609 km; 1.000 km = 0.621 mi

== Louisiana Highway 1012 ==
Louisiana Highway 1012
- Location: Assumption Parish
- Length: 1.841 mi (2.963 km)
- Existed: 1955–present

Louisiana Highway 1012 (LA 1012) runs 1.84 miles (2.96 km) in a north–south direction from a dead end to a junction with LA 1011 west of Supreme. The route's mileposts increase from the northern end contrary to common practice.

The entire route is in Assumption Parish.

mi	km	Destinations	Notes
1.841	2.963	Dead end south of Himalaya Canal	Southern terminus
0.000	0.000	LA 1011	Northern terminus
1.000 mi = 1.609 km; 1.000 km = 0.621 mi

== Louisiana Highway 1013 ==
Louisiana Highway 1013
- Location: Brule Labadieville
- Length: 0.566 mi (911 m)
- Existed: 1955–present

Louisiana Highway 1013 (LA 1013) runs 0.57 miles (0.92 km) in an east–west direction from LA 398 at Brule Labadieville to a dead end east of Brule Labadieville.

The entire highway is in Assumption Parish.

Location	mi	km	Destinations	Notes
Brule Labadieville	0.000	0.000	LA 398	Western terminus
	0.566	0.911	Dead end east of LA 398	Eastern terminus
1.000 mi = 1.609 km; 1.000 km = 0.621 mi

== Louisiana Highway 1014 ==
Louisiana Highway 1014
- Location: Assumption Parish
- Length: 4.996 mi (8.040 km)
- Existed: 1955–present

Louisiana Highway 1014 (LA 1014) runs 5.00 miles (8.05 km) in a southwest to northeast direction from LA 308 to a local road north of Labadieville.

The entire highway is in Assumption Parish.

Location	mi	km	Destinations	Notes
Freetown	0.000	0.000	LA 308	Western terminus
	4.996	8.040	End state maintenance	Eastern terminus
1.000 mi = 1.609 km; 1.000 km = 0.621 mi

== Louisiana Highway 1015 ==
Louisiana Highway 1015
- Location: Pierre Part
- Length: 1.421 mi (2.287 km)
- Existed: 1955–present

Louisiana Highway 1015 (LA 1015) consists of two road segments with a total length of 1.42 miles (2.29 km) that are located in the Assumption Parish community of Pierre Part.

- LA 1015-1 runs 0.66 miles (1.06 km) along Bay Road and North Bay Street from LA 70 to a point near Pierre Bay.
- LA 1015-2 runs 0.76 miles (1.22 km) along South Bay Road from LA 70 to a point near Pierre Bay.

== Louisiana Highway 1016 ==
Louisiana Highway 1016
- Location: Assumption Parish
- Length: 6.493 mi (10.449 km)
- Existed: 1955–present

Louisiana Highway 1016 (LA 1016) consists of two road segments with a total length of 6.49 miles (10.44 km) that are located around the Assumption Parish community of Belle River.

- LA 1016-1 runs 2.88 miles (4.63 km) along Shell Beach Road from LA 70 to a point on Lake Verret.
- LA 1016-2 runs 3.61 miles (5.81 km) along Belle River Road from a point near Michel Road to a point beyond LA 70.

== Louisiana Highway 1017 ==
Louisiana Highway 1017
- Location: Sicily Island
- Length: 1.394 mi (2.243 km)
- Existed: 1955–present

Louisiana Highway 1017 (LA 1017) runs 1.39 miles (2.24 km) in a southeast to northwest direction from a point near Lake Louis to a junction with LA 8 in Sicily Island. The route's mileposts increase from the northern end contrary to common practice.

The entire highway is in Catahoula Parish.

Location	mi	km	Destinations	Notes
	1.394	2.243	Begin state maintenance west of Lake Louis	Southern terminus
Sicily Island	0.000	0.000	LA 8 (Newman Avenue)	Northern terminus
1.000 mi = 1.609 km; 1.000 km = 0.621 mi

== Louisiana Highway 1018 ==
Louisiana Highway 1018
- Location: Harrisonburg
- Length: 0.163 mi (262 m)
- Existed: 1955–present

Louisiana Highway 1018 (LA 1018) consists of two road segments with a total length of 0.16 miles (0.26 km) that are located in the Catahoula Parish village of Harrisonburg.

- LA 1018-1 runs 0.10 miles (0.16 km) along Sicily Street from LA 124 (Brushley Street) to Catahoula Street.
- LA 1018-2 runs 0.07 miles (0.11 km) along Short Street from LA 8 (Pine Street) to LA 1018-1 (Sicily Street).

== Louisiana Highway 1019 ==
Louisiana Highway 1019
- Location: Livingston Parish
- Length: 12.797 mi (20.595 km)
- Existed: 1955–present

Louisiana Highway 1019 (LA 1019) runs 12.80 miles (20.60 km) in a southwest to northeast direction from LA 64 north of Denham Springs to LA 63 east of Oldfield. The route is bannered in all four cardinal directions with the signage changing from north–south to east–west at Watson.

The entire highway is in Livingston Parish.

Location	mi	km	Destinations	Notes
Plainview	0.000	0.000	LA 64 (Magnolia Beach Road) – Denham Springs, Greenwell Springs	Southwestern terminus
	1.243	2.000	LA 1024 east (Hunstock Road)	Western terminus of LA 1024
	2.647	4.260	LA 1020 north (Bend Road)	Southern terminus of LA 1020
Watson	3.024– 3.035	4.867– 4.884	LA 16 – Denham Springs, Pine Grove	
	5.612	9.032	LA 1022 north (Fore Road)	Southern terminus of LA 1022
	7.598	12.228	LA 1023 north (Reinninger Road)	Southern terminus of LA 1023
Friendship	8.593	13.829	LA 447 (Walker Road North)	
	12.797	20.595	LA 63 – Weiss, Livingston	Northeastern terminus
1.000 mi = 1.609 km; 1.000 km = 0.621 mi

== Louisiana Highway 1020 ==
Louisiana Highway 1020
- Location: Livingston Parish
- Length: 1.997 mi (3.214 km)
- Existed: 1955–present

Louisiana Highway 1020 (LA 1020) runs 2.00 miles (3.22 km) in a north–south direction along Bend Road from LA 1019 west of Watson to a dead end near the Amite River northwest of Watson.

It is an undivided two-lane highway for its entire length.

The entire route is in Livingston Parish.

mi	km	Destinations	Notes
0.000	0.000	LA 1019	Southern terminus
1.997	3.214	Dead end near Amite River	Northern terminus
1.000 mi = 1.609 km; 1.000 km = 0.621 mi

== Louisiana Highway 1021 ==
Louisiana Highway 1021
- Location: Livingston Parish
- Length: 0.19 mi (310 m)
- Existed: 1955–c. 1957

Louisiana Highway 1021 (LA 1021) ran 0.19 miles (0.31 km) in an east–west direction from LA 1019 to a point on Amite Church Road southwest of Watson.

The entire route was in Livingston Parish.

mi	km	Destinations	Notes
0.00	0.00	LA 1019	Western terminus
0.19	0.31	End state maintenance on Amite Church Road	Eastern terminus
1.000 mi = 1.609 km; 1.000 km = 0.621 mi

== Louisiana Highway 1022 ==
Louisiana Highway 1022
- Location: Livingston Parish
- Length: 1.821 mi (2.931 km)
- Existed: 1955–present

Louisiana Highway 1022 (LA 1022) runs 1.82 miles (2.93 km) in a southeast to northwest direction along Fore Road from LA 1019 to LA 16 northeast of Watson.

It is an undivided two-lane highway for its entire length.

The entire route is in Livingston Parish.

mi	km	Destinations	Notes
0.000	0.000	LA 1019 (Springfield Road)	Southern terminus
1.821	2.931	LA 16 – Watson, Pine Grove	Northern terminus
1.000 mi = 1.609 km; 1.000 km = 0.621 mi

== Louisiana Highway 1023 ==
Louisiana Highway 1023
- Location: Livingston Parish
- Length: 4.007 mi (6.449 km)
- Existed: 1955–present

Louisiana Highway 1023 (LA 1023) runs 4.01 miles (6.45 km) in a north–south direction along Reinninger Road from LA 1019 west of Friendship to LA 63 east of Weiss.

It is an undivided two-lane highway for its entire length.

The entire route is in Livingston Parish.

mi	km	Destinations	Notes
0.000	0.000	LA 1019 (Springfield Road)	Southern terminus
4.007	6.449	LA 63 (Weiss Road) – Weiss, Livingston	Northern terminus
1.000 mi = 1.609 km; 1.000 km = 0.621 mi

== Louisiana Highway 1024 ==
Louisiana Highway 1024
- Location: Livingston Parish
- Length: 13.975 mi (22.491 km)
- Existed: 1955–present

Louisiana Highway 1024 (LA 1024) runs 13.98 miles (22.50 km) in a northwest to southeast direction from LA 1019 southwest of Watson to US 190 in Walker.

The entire highway is in Livingston Parish.

Location	mi	km	Destinations	Notes
	0.000	0.000	LA 1019	Western terminus
	0.682– 0.693	1.098– 1.115	LA 16 south – Denham Springs	West end of LA 16 concurrency
	1.403– 1.414	2.258– 2.276	LA 16 north – Watson	East end of LA 16 concurrency
	6.802	10.947	LA 447 (Walker Road North)	
	9.371	15.081	LA 449 (North Corbin Road)	
Walker	13.975	22.491	US 190 (Florida Boulevard) – Walker, Livingston	Eastern terminus
1.000 mi = 1.609 km; 1.000 km = 0.621 mi: Concurrency terminus

== Louisiana Highway 1025 ==
Louisiana Highway 1025
- Location: Livingston Parish
- Length: 6.266 mi (10.084 km)
- Existed: 1955–present

Louisiana Highway 1025 (LA 1025) runs 6.27 miles (10.09 km) in an east–west direction along Arnold Road from LA 16 north of Denham Springs to LA 447 north of Walker.

It is an undivided two-lane highway for its entire length.

The entire route is in Livingston Parish.

mi	km	Destinations	Notes
0.000– 0.010	0.000– 0.016	LA 16 – Denham Springs, Watson	Western terminus
6.266	10.084	LA 447 (Walker Road North)	Eastern terminus
1.000 mi = 1.609 km; 1.000 km = 0.621 mi

== Louisiana Highway 1026 ==
Louisiana Highway 1026
- Location: Livingston Parish
- Length: 10.079 mi (16.221 km)
- Existed: 1955–present

Louisiana Highway 1026 (LA 1026) runs 10.08 miles (16.22 km) in a general north–south direction from LA 16 southeast of Denham Springs to the junction of LA 16 and LA 64 north of Denham Springs.

The entire route is in Livingston Parish.

mi	km	Destinations	Notes
0.000	0.000	LA 16 – Denham Springs, Port Vincent	Southern terminus
3.059– 3.244	4.923– 5.221	I-12 – Baton Rouge, Hammond	Exit 12 on I-12
4.424	7.120	US 190 west (Florida Boulevard) – Denham Springs	South end of US 190 concurrency
5.062– 5.094	8.146– 8.198	US 190 east (Florida Boulevard) – Walker; LA 1027	North end of US 190 concurrency; south end of LA 1027 concurrency; western terminus of LA 1027
5.539	8.914	LA 1027 east (Burgess Avenue)	North end of LA 1027 concurrency
8.308	13.370	LA 1030 west (Cockerham Road)	Eastern terminus of LA 1030
10.079	16.221	LA 16 – Denham Springs, Watson LA 64 west (Magnolia Beach Road) – Greenwell Springs	Northern terminus of LA 1026; eastern terminus of LA 64
1.000 mi = 1.609 km; 1.000 km = 0.621 mi: Concurrency terminus

== Louisiana Highway 1027 ==
Louisiana Highway 1027
- Location: Walker
- Length: 0.310 mi (499 m)
- Existed: 1955–present

Louisiana Highway 1027 (LA 1027) runs 0.75 miles (1.21 km) in an east–west direction along Burgess Avenue from the junction of US 190 and LA 1026 west of Walker to the Walker city limit. Though signed in the field, the concurrency with LA 1026 at its western end is not included in the official route mileage, resulting in a slightly shorter figure of 0.31 miles (0.50 km). LA 1027 formerly extended further east on Burgess Avenue into Walker to LA 447, but this portion was deleted from the state highway system in 2017 as part of La DOTD's Road Transfer Program.

The entire highway is in Livingston Parish.

Location	mi	km	Destinations	Notes
			US 190 / LA 1026 south (Florida Boulevard) – Walker, Denham Springs	Western terminus; west end of LA 1026 concurrency
0.444-mile (0.715 km) concurrency with LA 1026 not counted in route mileage
	0.000	0.000	LA 1026 north (Lockhart Road)	East end of LA 1026 concurrency
Walker	0.310	0.499	End state maintenance on Burgess Avenue at city limit	Eastern terminus
1.000 mi = 1.609 km; 1.000 km = 0.621 mi: Concurrency terminus

== Louisiana Highway 1028 ==
Louisiana Highway 1028
- Location: Livingston Parish
- Length: 1.813 mi (2.918 km)
- Existed: 1955–present

Louisiana Highway 1028 (LA 1028) runs 1.81 miles (2.91 km) in a north–south direction along Old River Road from LA 16 to LA 64 north of Denham Springs.

The route is bannered east–west and is an undivided two-lane highway for its entire length.

The entire route is in Livingston Parish.

mi	km	Destinations	Notes
0.000	0.000	LA 16 – Denham Springs, Watson	Southern terminus
1.813	2.918	LA 64 (Magnolia Beach Road) – Greenwell Springs	Northern terminus
1.000 mi = 1.609 km; 1.000 km = 0.621 mi

== Louisiana Highway 1029 ==
Louisiana Highway 1029
- Location: Walker
- Length: 1.586 mi (2.552 km)
- Existed: 1955–present

Louisiana Highway 1029 (LA 1029) runs 1.59 miles (2.56 km) in a southeast to northwest direction along Corbin Avenue from US 190 in Walker to LA 447 north of Walker.

It is an undivided two-lane highway for its entire length.

The entire highway is in Livingston Parish.

Location	mi	km	Destinations	Notes
Walker	0.000	0.000	US 190 (Florida Boulevard) – Walker, Livingston	Southern terminus
	1.586	2.552	LA 447 (Walker Road North)	Northern terminus
1.000 mi = 1.609 km; 1.000 km = 0.621 mi

== Louisiana Highway 1030 ==
Louisiana Highway 1030
- Location: Denham Springs
- Length: 0.428 mi (689 m)
- Existed: 1955–present

Louisiana Highway 1030 (LA 1030) runs 0.43 miles (0.69 km) in a general north–south direction along Cockerham Road from the Denham Springs city limit to a junction with LA 1026 northeast of Denham Springs. The route formerly extended further west along Cockerham Road into Denham Springs to LA 16, but this portion was deleted from the state highway system in 2017 as part of La DOTD's Road Transfer Program.

The entire highway is in Livingston Parish.

Location	mi	km	Destinations	Notes
Denham Springs	0.000	0.000	Begin state maintenance on Cockerham Road at city limit	Western terminus
	0.428	0.689	LA 1026 (Lockhart Road)	Eastern terminus
1.000 mi = 1.609 km; 1.000 km = 0.621 mi

== Louisiana Highway 1031 ==
Louisiana Highway 1031
- Location: Denham Springs
- Length: 1.174 mi (1.889 km)
- Existed: 1955–present

Louisiana Highway 1031 (LA 1031) runs 1.17 miles (1.88 km) in a north–south direction along Hatchell Lane from the junction of US 190 and LA 16 to a junction with Cockerham Road in Denham Springs.

The entire highway is in Denham Springs, Livingston Parish.

mi	km	Destinations	Notes
0.000	0.000	US 190 / LA 16 north (Florida Boulevard) – Walker, Baton Rouge LA 16 south (Pete's Highway) – Port Vincent	Southern terminus
1.174	1.889	Cockerham Road	Northern terminus
1.000 mi = 1.609 km; 1.000 km = 0.621 mi

== Louisiana Highway 1032 ==
Louisiana Highway 1032
- Location: Port Vincent–Denham Springs
- Length: 10.296 mi (16.570 km)
- Existed: 1955–present

Louisiana Highway 1032 (LA 1032) runs 10.30 miles (16.58 km) in a southeast to northwest direction from LA 16 northwest of Port Vincent to US 190 in Denham Springs.

The entire highway is in Livingston Parish.

Location	mi	km	Destinations	Notes
	0.000	0.000	LA 16 – Port Vincent, Denham Springs	Southern terminus
	3.755	6.043	LA 1033 east	Western terminus of LA 1033
	9.171	14.759	LA 1034 east (Vincent Road) to I-12	Western terminus of LA 1034
Denham Springs	10.190	16.399	LA 3003 east (Rushing Road West) to I-12	Western terminus of LA 3003
Denham Springs	10.296	16.570	US 190 (Florida Avenue Southwest)	Northern terminus
1.000 mi = 1.609 km; 1.000 km = 0.621 mi

== Louisiana Highway 1033 ==
Louisiana Highway 1033
- Location: Livingston Parish
- Length: 1.408 mi (2.266 km)
- Existed: 1955–present

Louisiana Highway 1033 (LA 1033) runs 1.41 miles (2.27 km) in an east–west direction from LA 1032 to LA 16 northwest of Port Vincent.

It is an undivided two-lane highway for its entire length.

The entire route is in Livingston Parish.

mi	km	Destinations	Notes
0.000	0.000	LA 1032	Western terminus
1.408	2.266	LA 16 – Port Vincent, Denham Springs	Eastern terminus
1.000 mi = 1.609 km; 1.000 km = 0.621 mi

== Louisiana Highway 1034 ==
Louisiana Highway 1034
- Location: Denham Springs
- Length: 1.540 mi (2.478 km)
- Existed: 1955–present

Louisiana Highway 1034 (LA 1034) runs 1.54 miles (2.48 km) in an east–west direction along Vincent Road from LA 1032 to LA 16 south of Denham Springs.

It is an undivided two-lane highway from LA 1032 to LA 3002, at which it point it widens to four lanes with a center turn lane for the remainder of the route.

The entire highway is in Livingston Parish.

Location	mi	km	Destinations	Notes
	0.000	0.000	LA 1032 (4-H Club Road)	Western terminus
Denham Springs	0.879	1.415	LA 3002 north (South Range Avenue) to I-12	Southern terminus of LA 3002
	1.540	2.478	LA 16 (Pete's Highway) – Denham Springs, Port Vincent	Eastern terminus
1.000 mi = 1.609 km; 1.000 km = 0.621 mi

== Louisiana Highway 1035 ==
Louisiana Highway 1035
- Location: Livingston
- Length: 1.142 mi (1.838 km)
- Existed: 1955–present

Louisiana Highway 1035 (LA 1035) consists of four road segments with a total length of 1.14 miles (1.83 km) that are located in the Livingston Parish town of Livingston.

- LA 1035-1 runs 0.27 miles (0.43 km) along South Magnolia Street from a point south of Iowa Street to the concurrent US 190/LA 63 (Florida Boulevard).
- LA 1035-2 runs 0.28 miles (0.45 km) along South Poplar Street from a point south of Iowa Street to the concurrent US 190/LA 63 (Florida Boulevard).
- LA 1035-3 runs 0.07 miles (0.11 km) along Iowa Street from LA 1035-2 (South Poplar Street) to LA 1035-1 (South Magnolia Street).
- LA 1035-4 runs 0.53 miles (0.85 km) along Circle Drive from LA 1035-1 (South Magnolia Street) to US 190 (Florida Boulevard).

By 2022, the portions of LA 1035-1 and LA 1035-2 north of Ohio Street, all of LA 1035-3 and all of LA 1035-4 were removed from the state highway system and transferred to local control.

== Louisiana Highway 1036 ==
Louisiana Highway 1036
- Location: Holden–Montpelier
- Length: 16.744 mi (26.947 km)
- Existed: 1955–present

Louisiana Highway 1036 (LA 1036) runs 16.74 miles (26.94 km) in a north–south direction from LA 441 in Holden, Livingston Parish to a second junction with LA 441 in Montpelier, St. Helena Parish.

The route heads initially heads northwest from the unincorporated community of Holden. After crossing the Tickfaw River, LA 1036 curves northward to an intersection with LA 441 between Magnolia and Starns. The highway turns west concurrent with LA 441 for 1.1 miles (1.8 km) then turns north again at Magnolia. 8.6 miles (13.8 km) later, after having crossed from Livingston Parish into St. Helena Parish, LA 1036 turns east at a T-intersection with LA 1041 and proceeds to its terminus at LA 441 in the village of Montpelier.

Parish	Location	mi	km	Destinations	Notes
Livingston	Holden	0.000	0.000	LA 441	Southern terminus
Livingston		4.457	7.173	LA 442 east	South end of LA 442 concurrency
Livingston	Magnolia, Livingston Parish	5.547	8.927	LA 442 west	North end of LA 442 concurrency
St. Helena		14.171	22.806	LA 1041 west	Eastern terminus of LA 1041
St. Helena	Montpelier	16.744	26.947	LA 441	Northern terminus
1.000 mi = 1.609 km; 1.000 km = 0.621 mi: Concurrency terminus

== Louisiana Highway 1037 ==
Louisiana Highway 1037
- Location: Springfield
- Length: 8.764 mi (14.104 km)
- Existed: 1955–present

Louisiana Highway 1037 (LA 1037) runs 8.764 miles (14.104 km) in a general east–west direction from a point north of Tickfaw State Park to a point on the Natalbany River in Springfield.

The entire highway is in Livingston Parish.

Location	mi	km	Destinations	Notes
	0.000	0.000	Begin state maintenance on Blood River Road	Western terminus
Springfield	7.531	12.120	LA 22 east (Walnut Street) – Ponchatoula LA 42 west (Main Street) – Albany	West end of LA 22 concurrency; eastern terminus of LA 42
Springfield	7.660	12.328	LA 1038 west (Carter Cemetery Road)	Eastern terminus of LA 1038
Springfield	7.931	12.764	LA 22 west (Main Street) – Killian	East end of LA 22 concurrency
Springfield	8.764	14.104	Dead end at Natalbany River	Eastern terminus
1.000 mi = 1.609 km; 1.000 km = 0.621 mi: Concurrency terminus

== Louisiana Highway 1038 ==
Louisiana Highway 1038
- Location: Springfield
- Length: 0.909 mi (1,463 m)
- Existed: 1955–present

Louisiana Highway 1038 (LA 1038) runs 0.91 miles (1.46 km) in a northeast to southwest direction along Carter Cemetery Road from an intersection with a local road southwest of Springfield to a junction with the concurrent LA 22/LA 1037 inside the corporate limits. The route is bannered east–west, and its mileposts increase from the eastern end contrary to common practice.

The entire highway is in Livingston Parish.

Location	mi	km	Destinations	Notes
	0.909	1.463	Begin state maintenance at junction of Carter Cemetery Road and Coates Road	Western terminus
Springfield	0.000	0.000	LA 22 / LA 1037 (Main Street)	Eastern terminus
1.000 mi = 1.609 km; 1.000 km = 0.621 mi

== Louisiana Highway 1039 ==
Louisiana Highway 1039
- Location: Denson–Maurepas
- Length: 3.417 mi (5.499 km)
- Existed: 1955–present

Louisiana Highway 1039 (LA 1039) runs 3.42 miles (5.50 km) in a general north–south direction from a local road west of Denson to a junction with LA 22 east of Maurepas. The route's mileposts increase from the northern end contrary to common practice.

LA 1039 heads east on Black Lake Club Road from a point near Easterly Lane and proceeds to the tiny community of Denson. Here, the highway turns north onto Bear Island Road and continues to the junction with LA 22 near Maurepas. LA 1039 is an undivided two-lane highway for its entire length.

The entire route is in Livingston Parish.

mi	km	Destinations	Notes
3.417	5.499	Begin state maintenance on Black Lake Club Road	Southern terminus
0.000	0.000	LA 22 – Killian, French Settlement	Northern terminus
1.000 mi = 1.609 km; 1.000 km = 0.621 mi

== Louisiana Highway 1040 ==
Louisiana Highway 1040
- Location: Albany–Hammond
- Length: 6.001 mi (9.658 km)
- Existed: 1955–present

Louisiana Highway 1040 (LA 1040) runs 6.00 miles (9.66 km) in an east–west direction from LA 43 south of Albany to US 51 in Hammond.

The route begins at a point on LA 43 located just north of I-12 (exit 32) between Hungarian Settlement and Albany. It heads east on Old Baton Rouge Highway, an undivided two-lane highway, and crosses the Natalbany River from Livingston Parish into Tangipahoa Parish. A short distance later, LA 1040 intersects LA 1249 (Pumpkin Center Road), connecting to exit 35 on I-12 north of Pumpkin Center. After curving to the northeast, LA 1040 crosses over without intersecting I-55, simultaneously entering the city of Hammond. The route curves due east onto Chauvin Road, widening to accommodate a center turning lane, and terminates shortly afterward at a junction with US 51 (South Morrison Boulevard). A local road known as Corbin Road continues the path of Chauvin Road eastward.

In the pre-1955 state highway system, LA 1040 was designated as State Route 7-D. It was a portion of the original alignment of the concurrent US 190 and State Route 7 bypassed in 1929. The route became LA 1040 in the 1955 Louisiana Highway renumbering and has remained largely the same to the present day apart from a small realignment on its eastern end. LA 1040 originally followed the entirety of Old Baton Rouge Highway to its intersection with US 51. However, this intersection, located only 300 feet (91 m) south of the junction of US 51 and US 190, was a source of traffic congestion. In 2009, LA 1040 was diverted onto Chauvin Road, a newly improved local road, which moved the highway's eastern terminus away from the US 51/US 190 junction.

Parish	Location	mi	km	Destinations	Notes
Livingston		0.000	0.000	LA 43 (Veterans Highway) – Albany, Springfield	Western terminus
Livingston–Tangipahoa parish line		1.324– 1.405	2.131– 2.261	Bridge over Natalbany River	
Tangipahoa		2.265	3.645	LA 1249 south (Pumpkin Center Road) to I-12	Northern terminus of LA 1249
Tangipahoa	Hammond	6.001	9.658	US 51 (South Morrison Boulevard) to I-12 / US 51 Bus. / US 190	Eastern terminus
1.000 mi = 1.609 km; 1.000 km = 0.621 mi

== Louisiana Highway 1041 ==
Louisiana Highway 1041
- Location: St. Helena Parish
- Length: 5.349 mi (8.608 km)
- Existed: 1955–present

Louisiana Highway 1041 (LA 1041) runs 5.35 miles (8.61 km) in a northwest to southeast direction from the junction of LA 16 and LA 449 in Pine Grove to LA 1036 west of Montpelier.

It is an undivided two-lane highway for its entire length.

The entire highway is in St. Helena Parish.

Location	mi	km	Destinations	Notes
Pine Grove	0.000	0.000	LA 16 / LA 449 south – Montpelier, Denham Springs LA 449 north – Greensburg	Western terminus
	5.349	8.608	LA 1036	Eastern terminus
1.000 mi = 1.609 km; 1.000 km = 0.621 mi

== Louisiana Highway 1042 ==
Louisiana Highway 1042
- Location: Greensburg
- Length: 5.544 mi (8.922 km)
- Existed: 1955–present

Louisiana Highway 1042 (LA 1042) runs 5.54 miles (8.92 km) in an east–west direction from Parish Road 1042 west of Greensburg to LA 37 in Greensburg. The route's mileposts increase from the eastern end contrary to common practice.

The entire highway is in St. Helena Parish.

Location	mi	km	Destinations	Notes
	5.544	8.922	PR 1042	Western terminus
Greensburg	0.000	0.000	LA 37	Eastern terminus
1.000 mi = 1.609 km; 1.000 km = 0.621 mi

== Louisiana Highway 1043 ==
Louisiana Highway 1043
- Location: Darlington–Liverpool
- Length: 7.460 mi (12.006 km)
- Existed: 1955–present

Louisiana Highway 1043 (LA 1043) runs 7.46 miles (12.01 km) in a southwest to northeast direction from LA 10 east of Darlington to LA 43 at Liverpool. The route is bannered north–south.

The entire highway is in St. Helena Parish.

Location	mi	km	Destinations	Notes
	0.000	0.000	LA 10 – Greensburg, Clinton	Southern terminus
Liverpool	7.460	12.006	LA 43 – Easleyville, Greensburg	Northern terminus
1.000 mi = 1.609 km; 1.000 km = 0.621 mi

== Louisiana Highway 1044 ==
Louisiana Highway 1044
- Location: St. Helena Parish
- Length: 5.705 mi (9.181 km)
- Existed: 1955–present

Louisiana Highway 1044 (LA 1044) runs 5.71 miles (9.19 km) in a north–south direction from LA 432 in Chipola to the Mississippi state line north of Chipola.

The entire highway is in St. Helena Parish.

Location	mi	km	Destinations	Notes
Chipola	0.000	0.000	LA 432	Southern terminus
	5.705	9.181	Bean Road	Northern terminus; continuation in Mississippi
1.000 mi = 1.609 km; 1.000 km = 0.621 mi

== Louisiana Highway 1045 ==
Louisiana Highway 1045
- Location: Hillsdale–Amite City
- Length: 7.310 mi (11.764 km)
- Existed: 1955–present

Louisiana Highway 1045 (LA 1045) runs 7.31 miles (11.76 km) in an east–west direction from LA 43 south of Greensburg, St. Helena Parish to LA 16 west of Amite City, Tangipahoa Parish.

Parish	Location	mi	km	Destinations	Notes
St. Helena		0.000	0.000	LA 43 – Greensburg, Montpelier	Western terminus
St. Helena	Hillsdale	2.361	3.800	LA 441	
Tangipahoa		7.115	11.450	LA 1046 north	Eastern terminus of LA 1046
Tangipahoa		7.279– 7.310	11.714– 11.764	LA 16 – Amite, Montpelier	Eastern terminus
1.000 mi = 1.609 km; 1.000 km = 0.621 mi

== Louisiana Highway 1046 ==
Louisiana Highway 1046
- Location: Hillsdale–Amite City
- Length: 5.458 mi (8.784 km)
- Existed: 1955–present

Louisiana Highway 1046 (LA 1046) runs 5.46 miles (8.79 km) in a northwest to southeast direction from LA 441 north of Hillsdale, St. Helena Parish to LA 1045 west of Amite City, Tangipahoa Parish.

Parish	Location	mi	km	Destinations	Notes
St. Helena		0.000	0.000	LA 441	Western terminus
St. Helena	Kedron	2.785	4.482	LA 1047 north	Southeastern terminus of LA 1047
Tangipahoa		5.458	8.784	LA 1045	Eastern terminus
1.000 mi = 1.609 km; 1.000 km = 0.621 mi

== Louisiana Highway 1047 ==
Louisiana Highway 1047
- Location: St. Helena Parish
- Length: 5.015 mi (8.071 km)
- Existed: 1955–present

Louisiana Highway 1047 (LA 1047) runs 5.02 miles (8.08 km) in a northwest to southeast direction from LA 441 southeast of Greensburg to LA 1046 at Kedron.

It is an undivided two-lane highway for its entire length.

The entire highway is in St. Helena Parish.

Location	mi	km	Destinations	Notes
	0.000– 0.023	0.000– 0.037	LA 441	Northwestern terminus
	1.611	2.593	LA 1048 east	Western terminus of LA 1048
Kedron	5.015	8.071	LA 1046	Southeastern terminus
1.000 mi = 1.609 km; 1.000 km = 0.621 mi

== Louisiana Highway 1048 ==
Louisiana Highway 1048
- Location: Arcola
- Length: 4.982 mi (8.018 km)
- Existed: 1955–present

Louisiana Highway 1048 (LA 1048) runs 4.98 miles (8.01 km) in an east–west direction from LA 1047 southeast of Greensburg, St. Helena Parish to the concurrent US 51/LA 10 north of Roseland, Tangipahoa Parish.

The route heads southeast from LA 1047 and crosses from St. Helena Parish into Tangipahoa Parish. Now heading eastward, LA 1048 passes through a diamond interchange with I-55 (exit 50), connecting with Hammond, Louisiana to the south and Jackson, Mississippi to the north. The highway proceeds a short distance further to a T-intersection with US 51/LA 10 at Arcola, a point just north of Roseland.

Parish	Location	mi	km	Destinations	Notes
St. Helena		0.000	0.000	LA 1047	Western terminus
Tangipahoa		3.542– 3.663	5.700– 5.895	I-55 – Hammond, Jackson	Exit 50 on I-55
Tangipahoa	Arcola	4.982	8.018	US 51 / LA 10 – Amite, Kentwood	Eastern terminus
1.000 mi = 1.609 km; 1.000 km = 0.621 mi

== Louisiana Highway 1049 ==
Louisiana Highway 1049
- Location: Kentwood
- Length: 5.520 mi (8.884 km)
- Existed: 1955–present

Louisiana Highway 1049 (LA 1049) runs 5.52 miles (8.88 km) in a southwest to northeast direction from LA 440 west of Tangipahoa to LA 38 in Kentwood, Tangipahoa Parish.

LA 1049 initially heads north along the St. Helena Parish line then curves to the northeast and crosses LA 1050. The highway enters the Kentwood city limits on Collis B. Temple Sr. Road, passing under without intersecting I-55. It then turns north onto 9th Street at LA 1051 and proceeds a short distance to its terminus at LA 38 (Avenue G). LA 1049 is an undivided two-lane highway for its entire length.

Parish	Location	mi	km	Destinations	Notes
St. Helena–Tangipahoa parish line		0.000	0.000	LA 440	Southern terminus
Tangipahoa		2.346	3.776	LA 1050	
Tangipahoa	Kentwood	5.065	8.151	LA 1051 south (9th Street)	Northern terminus of LA 1051
Tangipahoa	Kentwood	5.520	8.884	LA 38 (Avenue G)	Northern terminus
1.000 mi = 1.609 km; 1.000 km = 0.621 mi
