= Louisiana Highway 308 =

State highway in Louisiana, United States

Louisiana Highway 308

Route information
- Maintained by Louisiana DOTD
- Length: 82.5 mi (132.8 km)
- Existed: 1955 renumbering–present

Major junctions
- Southeast end: LA 1 in Golden Meadow
- Future I-49 / US 90 in Raceland LA 182 in Raceland; LA 20 in Thibodaux LA 70 north of Paincourtville
- Northwest end: LA 3089 in Donaldsonville

Location
- Country: United States
- State: Louisiana
- Parishes: Lafourche, Assumption, Ascension

Highway system
- Louisiana State Highway System; Interstate; US; State; Scenic
← LA 307	→ LA 309

Louisiana Highway 308 (LA 308) is a state highway in Louisiana that serves Ascension, Assumption, and Lafourche Parishes. It spans 82.5 miles (132.8 km), following the east bank of Bayou Lafourche from Donaldsonville to Golden Meadow. It parallels LA 1 during its entire route, as LA 1 follows the west bank of the bayou.

== Route description ==
LA 308 is the eastbank counterpart to LA 1, as it follows the east side of Bayou Lafourche. As the eastbank of Bayou Lafourche is generally less populated than the westbank, LA 308 serves as a slightly quicker route towards south central Louisiana and lower Bayou Lafourche than LA 1. Throughout its route, there are bridges that cross Bayou Lafourche to connect LA 308 to LA 1 and local communities. LA 308 is known as Bayou Road in Thibodaux and East Main Street south of Larose.

The route begins north of Golden Meadow at the Golden Meadow Bridge crossing over Bayou Lafourche from LA 1 and runs parallel with Bayou Lafourche and LA 1 heading north, passing through Galliano and Cut Off before entering Larose. The highway loops around Larose and crosses over LA 657 before running parallel with LA 1 and Bayou Lafourche again. The highway intersects LA 3220 that crosses over Bayou Lafourche before entering Lockport. As it enters town, it intersects with LA 655 before running parallel with LA 1 and Bayou Lafourche. It intersects LA 654 before passing through Mathews, The highway then interchanges with US 90. However, LA 308 has no access to the westbound lanes on US 90. It only has access to the eastbound lanes and the westbound lanes on US 90 have access to LA 308, resulting in an incomplete interchange for the highway. As it passes through Raceland, the highway intersects LA 182 that only runs concurrent with LA 1 for about 0.5 miles (0.80 km). The highway then heads west along with Bayou Lafourche and LA 1, passing through St. Charles and enters Thibodaux. It intersects LA 20 and runs concurrent with it for about 0.3 miles (0.48 km). It also intersects with LA 3266, LA 3185, and LA 304 heading towards Labadieville. It intersects LA 1014 and LA 1011 as it passes through Supreme. Heading north, it intersects LA 1010 and then passes through Napoleonville. It then curves along Bayou Lafourche passing through Plattenville and intersecting with LA 70 Spur. LA 308 then heads through Paincourtville, intersecting LA 403 and LA 70 before heading north again. The route then passes through Belle Rose and intersects LA 998 before continuing north towards Donaldsonville. It intersects LA 943 before entering Donaldsonville and intersects LA 945 and its spur route before reaching its northern terminus at LA 3089.

== Major intersections ==
Parish	Location	mi	km	Destinations	Notes
Lafourche	Golden Meadow	0.0	0.0	LA 1 – Larose, Grand Isle	Southern terminus
Lafourche	Golden Meadow	0.0	0.0	Bridge over Bayou Lafourche	
Lafourche	Galliano	6.7	10.8	LA 3162	Eastern terminus of LA 3162
Lafourche	Larose	14.8	23.8	LA 657 (East Main Street)	
Lafourche	Larose	15.2	24.5	Bridge over Gulf Intracoastal Waterway	
Lafourche		25.6	41.2	LA 3220 (Bridge Road)	Eastern terminus of LA 3220
Lafourche	Rita	26.7	43.0	LA 655 (East Main Street) – Lockport	Eastern terminus of LA 655
Lafourche	Rita	27.2	43.8	Bridge over Company Canal	
Lafourche	Mathews	29.2	47.0	LA 654 – Gheens	
Lafourche	Raceland	32.0	51.5	US 90 east – New Orleans	Exit 215B (U.S. 90); Eastbound entrance and westbound exit
Lafourche	Raceland	34.2	55.0	LA 182 (Mill Street) – Houma, New Orleans	
Lafourche	St. Charles	42.6	68.6	LA 649	Northern terminus of LA 649
Lafourche		47.2	76.0	LA 648 (Percy Brown Road)	Northeastern terminus of LA 648
Lafourche	Thibodaux	49.1	79.0	LA 20 east (North Canal Boulevard) – Gramercy	South end of LA 20 concurrency
Lafourche	Thibodaux	49.4	79.5	LA 20 west (Jackson Street) – Houma	North end of LA 20 concurrency
Lafourche		50.2	80.8	LA 3266 (Coulon Plantation Road/Tiger Drive)	Southern terminus of LA 3266
Lafourche		51.1	82.2	LA 3185 (West Thibodaux Bypass Road)	Northwestern terminus of LA 3185
Lafourche	Laurel Grove	53.5	86.1	LA 304 – Chackbay	Southern terminus of LA 304
Assumption		58.0	93.3	LA 1247 – Labadieville	Northern terminus of LA 1247
Assumption	Leche	59.7	96.1	LA 1014 (Freetown Road)	Southwestern terminus of LA 1014
Assumption		60.2	96.9	LA 1011 – Supreme	Eastern terminus of LA 1011
Assumption		62.8	101.1	LA 1010	Northern terminus of LA 1010
Assumption		66.9	107.7	LA 1008 – Napoleonville	Northeastern terminus of LA 1008
Assumption		68.0	109.4	LA 402 – Munsons, Brusle St. Vincent	Eastern terminus of LA 402
Assumption	Plattenville	71.0	114.3	LA 70 Spur	
Assumption		72.6	116.8	LA 403 – Paincourtville	Northern terminus of LA 403
Assumption		73.1	117.6	LA 70 – Pierre Part, Sorrento	To Sunshine Bridge eastbound
Assumption		76.9	123.8	LA 998 – Belle Rose	Southeastern terminus of LA 998
Ascension		79.8	128.4	LA 943 – Barton	Southeastern terminus of LA 943
Ascension	Donaldsonville	81.9	131.8	LA 945 (Vatican Drive)	Western terminus of LA 945
Ascension	Donaldsonville	82.5	132.8	LA 3089 (Marchand Drive)	Northern terminus
1.000 mi = 1.609 km; 1.000 km = 0.621 mi: Concurrency terminus; Incomplete access

== Louisiana Highway 308 Spur ==
Louisiana Highway 308 Spur
- Location: Galliano
- Length: 0.69 mi (1,110 m)
- Existed: 1970–1994

LA 308 Spur provided a connection between LA 3235 and LA 1 on the west bank of Bayou Lafourche with LA 308 on the east bank in Galliano. The route is now LA 3162.

The entire highway was in Galliano, Lafourche Parish.

mi	km	Destinations	Notes
0.00	0.00	LA 3235 – Larose, Golden Meadow	Western terminus
0.63	1.01	LA 1 – Larose, Grand Isle	
0.66	1.06	Bridge over Bayou Lafourche	
0.69	1.11	LA 308 – Larose, Grand Isle	Eastern terminus
1.000 mi = 1.609 km; 1.000 km = 0.621 mi
