= Louisiana Highway 70 =

State highway in Louisiana, United States

Louisiana Highway 70

Route information
- Maintained by Louisiana DOTD
- Length: 51.2 mi (82.4 km)

Major junctions
- South end: Future I-49 / US 90 / LA 182 in Morgan City
- LA 69 south of White Castle; LA 1 north of Paincourtville; LA 3127 near Donaldsonville; LA 18 near Donaldsonville; LA 44 near Sunshine; LA 3125 near Sunshine
- North end: LA 22 near Sorrento

Location
- Country: United States
- State: Louisiana
- Parishes: St. Mary, St. Martin, Assumption, Ascension, St. James

Highway system
- Louisiana State Highway System; Interstate; US; State; Scenic
← LA 69	→ US 71

Louisiana Highway 70 (LA 70) is a state highway in Louisiana that serves St. Mary, St. Martin, Assumption, and Ascension parishes. It is primarily a two-lane highway that spans 51.2 miles (82.4 km).

== Route description ==
LA 70 begins at an exit from U.S. Highway 90 in Morgan City. Within the same interchange, US 90 Business and LA 182 pass underneath US 90. LA 70 then heads north into Assumption Parish, where it runs through Pierre Part. In Paincourtville, LA 70 intersects LA 1 via Louisiana Highway 70 Spur, a 1.6-mile-long (2.6 km) connector road. LA 70 then continues northeastward through rural Ascension Parish as a two-lane, undivided road. LA 70 widens to a four lane, undivided road at an intersection with LA 3089. LA 70 then crosses the Mississippi River via the Sunshine Bridge. LA 70 then narrows back to a two lane undivided road after intersecting LA 44 and continues northeastward until it ends at an intersection with LA 22, just south of Interstate 10.

== History ==
Originally, LA 70 was a much shorter route serving only Assumption Parish and only approximately 17 miles in length. Until the late 1950s, the road went from Pierre Part to Paintcourtville, with its southern terminus being near Belle River in Assumption Parish (four miles south of Pierre Part) and northern terminus at LA 1. In 1958, a swing bridge was built on Belle River, and the road was extended southward to parallel the Atchafalaya River through Lower St. Martin and upper St. Mary Parish to reach Morgan City.

The northern extension of LA 70 from Paincourtville/Plattenville to Sorrento/I-10 occurred in 1977. The road was extended from LA 1, crossing Bayou Lafourche, to LA 3089. LA 70 then assumed most of LA 3089's original routing, crossing the Sunshine Bridge to connect to LA 22 near I-10 in Sorrento.

== Major junctions ==
Parish	Location	mi	km	Destinations	Notes
St. Mary	Morgan City	0.0– 0.1	0.0– 0.16	US 90 / US 90 Bus. east / LA 182 (Brasher Avenue) – New Orleans, Lafayette, Berwick, Houma	Interchange with US 90; western terminus of US 90 Bus. Exit 175 on US 90
St. Martin		16.1	25.9	LA 997 north	Southern terminus of LA 997
Assumption		16.3	26.2	LA 1016-2 south (Belle River Road)	Southern end of LA 1016-2 concurrency
Assumption		16.3	26.2	LA 1016-2 north (Belle River Road)	Northern end of LA 1016-2 concurrency
Assumption	Pierre Part	17.2	27.7	LA 1016-1 south (Shell Beach Road) – Lake Verret Shell Beach	Northern terminus of LA 1016-1
Assumption	Pierre Part	20.1	32.3	LA 1015-2 south (South Bay Road)	Northern terminus of LA 1015-2
Assumption	Pierre Part	20.2	32.5	LA 1015-1 south (Bay Road) / North Curtis Street	Northern terminus of LA 1015-1
Assumption	Grand Bayou	27.8	44.7	LA 69 north	Southern terminus of LA 69
Assumption		29.4	47.3	LA 996 north	Southern terminus of LA 996
Assumption		31.0	49.9	LA 1004 south	Northern terminus of LA 1004
Assumption		32.2	51.8	LA 1004 north	Southern terminus of LA 1003
Assumption	Paincourtville	32.8	52.8	LA 1 – Napoleonville	
Assumption		32.9	52.9	LA 308	
Assumption		35.0	56.3	LA 70 Spur south	Northern terminus of LA 70 Spur
Ascension		40.2	64.7	LA 3127 east – Vacherie	Western terminus of LA 3127
Ascension		41.1– 41.7	66.1– 67.1	LA 3089 north – Donaldsonville	Southern terminus of LA 3089
Ascension		42.9	69.0	LA 3120 north	Southern terminus of LA 3120
St. James	Lemannville	43.5	70.0	To LA 18	
Mississippi River		43.9– 45.2	70.7– 72.7	Sunshine Bridge	
St. James	Union	45.2– 45.7	72.7– 73.5	LA 44 – The Houmas, Poché Plantation, Bocage Plantation	Interchange
St. James	Union	46.9	75.5	LA 3125 east – Convent, Lutcher, Gramercy	Western terminus of LA 3125
Ascension	Sorrento	51.2	82.4	LA 22 – The Houmas, Bocage Plantation	
1.000 mi = 1.609 km; 1.000 km = 0.621 mi: Concurrency terminus

== Louisiana Highway 70 Spur ==
Louisiana Highway 70 Spur
- Location: Paincourtville
- Length: 1.6 mi (2.6 km)
- Existed: 1977–present

LA 70 Spur is a 1.6-mile-long (2.6 km) connector route between LA 70 and LA 1 in Plattenville. The route was created in 1977 with the extension of LA 70 from Paincourtville to the Sunshine Bridge as a bypass from Paincourtville to provide a more direct route to LA 1 and LA 308 and interests in Assumption Parish and southbound.

Major junctions The entire highway is in Assumption Parish.

Location	mi	km	Destinations	Notes
Paincourtville	0.0	0.0	LA 1	
Plattenville	0.1	0.16	LA 308	
	1.6	2.6	LA 70	
1.000 mi = 1.609 km; 1.000 km = 0.621 mi
