= Louisiana Highway 646 =

State highway in Louisiana, United States

Louisiana Highway 646
- LA 646 highlighted in red on a modern map

Route information
- Maintained by Louisiana DOTD
- Length: 3.3 mi (5.3 km)
- Existed: 1955 renumbering–1975

Major junctions
- Southeast end: LA 308 west of Thibodaux
- Northwest end: End state maintenance at Lafourche-Assumption parish line

Location
- Country: United States
- State: Louisiana
- Parishes: Lafourche

Highway system
- Louisiana State Highway System; Interstate; US; State; Scenic
← LA 645	→ LA 647

Louisiana Highway 646 (LA 646) was a state highway that served Lafourche Parish. It spanned a total of 3.3 miles (5.3 km) along French Plantation Road and Little Choupic Road west of Thibodaux, near the Lafourche-Assumption parish line.

== Route description ==
From the southeast, LA 646 began at an intersection with LA 308 west of Thibodaux and an area known as Laurel Grove. It proceeded northeast along French Plantation Road then turned in a general westerly direction to zigzag along Little Choupic Road to its terminus at the Assumption Parish line.

LA 646 was an undivided, two-lane highway for its entire length.

== History ==
LA 646 was designated as State Route C-1338 prior to the 1955 Louisiana Highway renumbering.

== Major intersections ==
Parish	Location	mi	km	Destinations	Notes
Lafourche		0.0	0.0	LA 308 – Donaldsonville, Thibodaux	Southeastern terminus; West of Laurel Grove
Lafourche–Assumption parish line		3.3	5.3	End state maintenance at parish line	Northwestern terminus
1.000 mi = 1.609 km; 1.000 km = 0.621 mi
