= 1924 United States presidential election in Louisiana =

- November 4, 1924

Nominee	John W. Davis	Calvin Coolidge
Party	Democratic	Republican
Home state	West Virginia	Massachusetts
Running mate	Charles W. Bryan	Charles G. Dawes
Electoral vote	10	0
Popular vote	93,218	24,670
Percentage	76.44%	20.23%
Parish results
Davis
40–50%
50–60%
60–70%
70–80%
80–90%
90–100%
Coolidge
60–70%
President before election
Calvin Coolidge
Republican
Elected President
Calvin Coolidge
Republican

The 1924 United States presidential election in Louisiana took place on November 4, 1924, as part of the 1924 United States presidential election, which was held throughout all contemporary forty-eight states. Voters chose ten representatives, or electors to the Electoral College, who voted for president and vice president.

Ever since the passage of a new constitution in 1898, Louisiana had been a one-party state dominated by the Democratic Party. The Republican Party became moribund due to the disenfranchisement of African-Americans and the complete absence of other support bases as Louisiana completely lacked upland or German refugee whites opposed to secession. Despite this absolute single-party dominance, non-partisan tendencies remained strong among wealthy sugar planters in Acadiana and within the business elite of New Orleans.

Following disfranchisement, the state's politics became dominated by the Choctaw Club of Louisiana, generally called the “Old Regulars”. This political machine was based in New Orleans and united with Black Belt cotton planters. Opposition began to emerge with the Socialist Party in the lumbering parishes in the late 1900s, and more seriously with the Progressive movement, chiefly in the southern sugar-growing parishes, in the 1910s. Conflicts with President Wilson's Underwoood-Simmons Act allowed a Progressive Party member in Whitmell P. Martin (Note: Martin would join the Democratic Party in 1919.) to be elected to the Third Congressional District in 1914, and in 1920 the racially less hardline Acadiana parishes turned to Republican candidate Warren G. Harding over disagreements on foreign policy and the Nineteenth Amendment. Continued opposition to the Choctaws would elect the reformer John M. Parker, originally part of Theodore Roosevelt's Bull Moose Party, as governor at the beginning of 1920.

Louisiana was won easily by John W. Davis of West Virginia over incumbent president Calvin Coolidge, being, as was typical at this height of the “Solid South”, Davis’ third-strongest state behind South Carolina and Mississippi with 76.44 percent of the popular vote. With the easing of foreign-policy tensions and conflicts over women's suffrage, the revolt from the previous two elections in Acadiana weakened, although Coolidge still ran much better there than he did in the racially hardline north and Florida Parishes. Louisiana was the only state where Progressive nominee Robert M. La Follette of Wisconsin was not on the ballot, although it is known that there were write-in votes cast for him.

== Results ==
1924 United States presidential election in Louisiana
Party	Candidate	Votes	%
Democratic	John W. Davis	93,218	76.44%
Republican	Calvin Coolidge (incumbent)	24,670	20.23%
Write-ins	—	4,063	3.33%
Total votes		117,888	100%

=== Results by parish ===
1924 United States presidential election in Louisiana by parish
Parish	John William Davis Democratic		John Calvin Coolidge Republican		Various candidates Write-ins		Margin		Total votes cast
Parish	#	%	#	%	#	%	#	%	Total votes cast
Acadia	1,481	64.73%	691	30.20%	116	5.07%	790	34.53%	2,288
Allen	1,012	71.17%	410	28.83%			602	42.33%	1,422
Ascension	679	71.03%	277	28.97%			402	42.05%	956
Assumption	305	33.66%	601	66.34%			-296	-32.67%	906
Avoyelles	1,010	76.28%	314	23.72%			696	52.57%	1,324
Beauregard	1,191	83.46%	235	16.47%	1	0.07%	956	66.99%	1,427
Bienville	774	91.71%	67	7.94%	3	0.36%	707	83.77%	844
Bossier	751	91.36%	48	5.84%	23	2.80%	703	85.52%	822
Caddo	4,517	75.41%	1,062	17.73%	411	6.86%	3,455	57.68%	5,990
Calcasieu	2,494	68.22%	1,129	30.88%	33	0.90%	1,365	37.34%	3,656
Caldwell	442	84.51%	77	14.72%	4	0.76%	365	69.79%	523
Cameron	353	94.64%	20	5.36%			333	89.28%	373
Catahoula	218	73.65%	78	26.35%			140	47.30%	296
Claiborne	1,252	95.87%	54	4.13%			1,198	91.73%	1,306
Concordia	319	87.40%	46	12.60%			273	74.79%	365
De Soto	1,146	89.88%	118	9.25%	11	0.86%	1,028	80.63%	1,275
East Baton Rouge	2,764	81.44%	611	18.00%	19	0.56%	2,153	63.44%	3,394
East Carroll	277	79.60%	71	20.40%			206	59.20%	348
East Feliciana	504	95.27%	25	4.73%			479	90.55%	529
Evangeline	603	79.66%	153	20.21%	1	0.13%	450	59.45%	757
Franklin	687	82.77%	143	17.23%			544	65.54%	830
Grant	595	78.08%	167	21.92%			428	56.17%	762
Iberia	740	52.15%	679	47.85%			61	4.30%	1,419
Iberville	556	58.28%	391	40.99%	7	0.73%	165	17.30%	954
Jackson	682	88.57%	88	11.43%			594	77.14%	770
Jefferson	1,663	76.46%	296	13.61%	216	9.93%	1,367	62.85%	2,175
Jefferson Davis	973	52.42%	883	47.58%			90	4.85%	1,856
Lafayette	978	53.36%	531	28.97%	324	17.68%	447	24.39%	1,833
Lafourche	678	52.60%	611	47.40%			67	5.20%	1,289
LaSalle	456	80.14%	102	17.93%	11	1.93%	354	62.21%	569
Lincoln	1,005	86.19%	157	13.46%	4	0.34%	848	72.73%	1,166
Livingston	657	85.66%	110	14.34%			547	71.32%	767
Madison	274	95.47%	13	4.53%			261	90.94%	287
Morehouse	582	80.50%	141	19.50%			441	61.00%	723
Natchitoches	1,132	84.10%	200	14.86%	14	1.04%	932	69.24%	1,346
Orleans	37,785	79.06%	7,865	16.46%	2,141	4.48%	29,920	62.61%	47,791
Ouachita	1,542	73.15%	480	22.77%	86	4.08%	1,062	50.38%	2,108
Plaquemines	432	75.66%	119	20.84%	20	3.50%	313	54.82%	571
Pointe Coupee	369	69.89%	146	27.65%	13	2.46%	223	42.23%	528
Rapides	2,159	65.62%	1,022	31.06%	109	3.31%	1,137	34.56%	3,290
Red River	579	89.49%	34	5.26%	34	5.26%	545	84.23%	647
Richland	678	85.39%	116	14.61%			562	70.78%	794
Sabine	1,176	83.82%	217	15.47%	10	0.71%	959	68.35%	1,403
Saint Bernard	526	97.59%	13	2.41%			513	95.18%	539
Saint Charles	488	78.71%	132	21.29%			356	57.42%	620
Saint Helena	185	91.13%	18	8.87%			167	82.27%	203
Saint James	615	68.64%	278	31.03%	3	0.33%	337	37.61%	896
Saint John the Baptist	336	63.40%	194	36.60%			142	26.79%	530
Saint Landry	1,354	79.14%	357	20.86%			997	58.27%	1,711
Saint Martin	461	71.36%	172	26.63%	13	2.01%	289	44.74%	646
Saint Mary	639	49.15%	633	48.69%	28	2.15%	6	0.46%	1,300
Saint Tammany	969	73.91%	269	20.52%	73	5.57%	700	53.39%	1,311
Tangipahoa	1,626	77.24%	479	22.76%			1,147	54.49%	2,105
Tensas	338	94.15%	21	5.85%			317	88.30%	359
Terrebonne	482	53.73%	415	46.27%			67	7.47%	897
Union	875	99.09%	7	0.79%	1	0.11%	868	98.30%	883
Vermilion	598	58.97%	416	41.03%			182	17.95%	1,014
Vernon	1,372	88.69%	142	9.18%	33	2.13%	1,230	79.51%	1,547
Washington	1,278	77.64%	179	10.87%	189	11.48%	1,099	66.77%	1,646
Webster	929	89.93%	52	5.03%	52	5.03%	877	84.90%	1,033
West Baton Rouge	191	58.95%	92	28.40%	41	12.65%	99	30.56%	324
West Carroll	342	81.62%	68	16.23%	9	2.15%	274	65.39%	419
West Feliciana	347	95.86%	15	4.14%			332	91.71%	362
Winn	797	86.91%	120	13.09%			677	73.83%	917
Totals	93,218	76.44%	24,670	20.23%	4,063	3.33%	68,548	56.21%	121,951

== See also ==
- United States presidential elections in Louisiana
