= Magnolia, Livingston Parish, Louisiana =

Unincorporated community in Louisiana

Magnolia, Louisiana
- Unincorporated community
- Location within Louisiana Location within the United States
- Coordinates: 30°33′37″N 90°42′22″W
- Country: United States
- State: Louisiana
- Parish: Livingston
- Elevation: 49 ft (15 m)
- Time zone: UTC-6 (Central (CST))
  - Summer (DST): UTC-5 (CDT)
- ZIP code: 70744
- Area code: 225
- GNIS feature ID: 555211
- FIPS code: 22-47770

Magnolia, also known as Otts Mill, is an unincorporated community in Livingston Parish, Louisiana, United States. The community is located 5 miles (8.0 kilometres) northwest of Livingston and 2 miles (3.2 kilometres) west of Starns on Louisiana Highway 442 at the intersection with Louisiana Highway 1036.

== Magnolia Baptist Church ==
Parish records indicate that the local Magnolia Baptist Church was built around 1919.
