= List of highways numbered 646 =

The following highways are numbered, 646:

== Canada ==
- Highway 646

== United States ==
- LA 646 (former)
- MD 646
- SR 646
- SR 646
- PA 646
- PR-646
- FM 646
- SR 646

Preceded by 645	Lists of highways 646	Succeeded by 647
