= 1940 United States presidential election in Louisiana =

- November 5, 1940

All 10 Louisiana votes to the Electoral College

Nominee	Franklin D. Roosevelt	Wendell Willkie
Party	Democratic	Republican
Home state	New York	New York
Running mate	Henry A. Wallace	Charles L. McNary
Electoral vote	10	0
Popular vote	319,751	52,446
Percentage	85.88%	14.09%
Parish results
Roosevelt
60–70%
70–80%
80–90%
90–100%
President before election
Franklin D. Roosevelt
Democratic
Elected President
Franklin D. Roosevelt
Democratic

The 1940 United States presidential election in Louisiana took place on November 5, 1940, as part of the 1940 United States presidential election. State voters chose ten representatives, or electors, to the Electoral College, who voted for president and vice president.

Until the rise of Huey P. Long, post-disenfranchisement Louisiana politics was dominated by the New Orleans-based “Choctaw Club”, which overcame Socialist, Wobbly, and Progressive challenges from the outlying upcountry, Imperial Calcasieu and Acadiana regions between the late 1900s and early 1920s. The three presidential elections between 1916 and 1924 saw a rebellion in Acadiana over sugar tariffs and Woodrow Wilson’s foreign and domestic policies; however, the nomination of Catholic Al Smith in 1928 rapidly restored their Democratic loyalty without causing significant upheaval in the remainder of the state, which was too focused on control of black labour to worry about Smith’s Catholicism.

Following the 1928 gubernatorial primary, Louisiana politics until Brown v. Board of Education would be governed by a system of coherent “Long” and “anti-Long” Democratic factionalism, as the administration of Huey Long introduced significant economic reforms, which were strongly opposed by the remnants of the old Choctaws. During the first term of Roosevelt, Long sought to capture the Presidency for himself under a “Share-Our-Wealth” program involving the confiscation of wealthy fortunes, family allowances, and government storage of agricultural surpluses. However, in the ensuing years Long's fortunes dwindled as a result of 1934 losses in the Sixth Congressional District and the New Orleans city council, before Senator Long launched a siege on New Orleans and the Choctaws, combined with abolition of the state's poll tax, in effort to regain his control over the state.

Long's assassination in 1935 meant he could not launch his planned presidential campaign against incumbent President Franklin D. Roosevelt. The 1936 election had seen sugar-dependent Assumption and Lafourche parishes defect to the GOP at a presidential level due to disagreements with Democratic tariff policy. However, as in 1928, this rebellion would be reversed, this time by Roosevelt's strong support for aid to distressed France in World War II by those parishes’ Creole and Cajun populations who were strongly tied to France. Roosevelt and Agriculture Secretary Henry A. Wallace thus won Louisiana with 85.88 percent of the popular vote, against Republican nominees Wendell Willkie and Senate Minority Leader Charles L. McNary, with 14.09 percent.

By percentage of the vote carried, Louisiana was the third-most lopsided contest in the nation, only behind South Carolina and Mississippi, whose margins both exceeded 90% in favor of Roosevelt.

== Results ==
1940 United States presidential election in Louisiana
Party	Candidate	Votes	%
Democratic	Franklin D. Roosevelt (inc.)	319,751	85.88%
Republican	Wendell Willkie	52,446	14.09%
Write-ins	—	108	0.03%
Total votes		372,305	100%

=== Results by parish ===
1940 United States presidential election in Louisiana by parish
Parish	Franklin Delano Roosevelt Democratic		Wendell Lewis Willkie Republican		Various candidates Write-ins		Margin		Total votes cast
Parish	#	%	#	%	#	%	#	%	Total votes cast
Acadia	5,058	87.52%	719	12.44%	2	0.03%	4,339	75.08%	5,779
Allen	2,592	90.35%	277	9.65%			2,315	80.69%	2,869
Ascension	2,451	86.42%	385	13.58%			2,066	72.85%	2,836
Assumption	1,759	70.90%	722	29.10%			1,037	41.80%	2,481
Avoyelles	4,883	96.39%	183	3.61%			4,700	92.78%	5,066
Beauregard	2,677	83.53%	528	16.47%			2,149	67.05%	3,205
Bienville	2,883	88.82%	362	11.15%	1	0.03%	2,521	77.66%	3,246
Bossier	3,045	91.17%	275	8.23%	20	0.60%	2,770	82.93%	3,340
Caddo	17,192	84.50%	3,124	15.36%	29	0.14%	14,068	69.15%	20,345
Calcasieu	6,993	82.96%	1,425	16.91%	11	0.13%	5,568	66.06%	8,429
Caldwell	1,668	83.99%	318	16.01%			1,350	67.98%	1,986
Cameron	1,175	96.08%	48	3.92%			1,127	92.15%	1,223
Catahoula	1,512	91.86%	134	8.14%			1,378	83.72%	1,646
Claiborne	3,049	94.22%	187	5.78%			2,862	88.44%	3,236
Concordia	1,173	90.79%	119	9.21%			1,054	81.58%	1,292
De Soto	2,872	93.16%	211	6.84%			2,661	86.31%	3,083
East Baton Rouge	13,303	88.30%	1,762	11.70%			11,541	76.61%	15,065
East Carroll	1,025	79.15%	270	20.85%			755	58.30%	1,295
East Feliciana	1,059	86.59%	164	13.41%			895	73.18%	1,223
Evangeline	3,569	94.19%	220	5.81%			3,349	88.39%	3,789
Franklin	3,159	91.54%	292	8.46%			2,867	83.08%	3,451
Grant	2,534	91.61%	232	8.39%			2,302	83.22%	2,766
Iberia	4,091	70.57%	1,706	29.43%			2,385	41.14%	5,797
Iberville	2,505	83.47%	496	16.53%			2,009	66.94%	3,001
Jackson	2,734	90.71%	280	9.29%			2,454	81.42%	3,014
Jefferson	8,334	89.46%	982	10.54%			7,352	78.92%	9,316
Jefferson Davis	2,531	70.60%	1,054	29.40%			1,477	41.20%	3,585
Lafayette	6,323	77.36%	1,850	22.64%			4,473	54.73%	8,173
Lafourche	3,531	76.83%	1,065	23.17%			2,466	53.66%	4,596
LaSalle	2,039	88.38%	258	11.18%	10	0.43%	1,781	77.20%	2,307
Lincoln	2,969	86.86%	449	13.14%			2,520	73.73%	3,418
Livingston	2,971	92.18%	252	7.82%			2,719	84.36%	3,223
Madison	1,017	84.82%	182	15.18%			835	69.64%	1,199
Morehouse	2,417	91.59%	222	8.41%			2,195	83.18%	2,639
Natchitoches	3,824	84.83%	684	15.17%			3,140	69.65%	4,508
Orleans	97,930	85.63%	16,406	14.35%	28	0.02%	81,524	71.28%	114,364
Ouachita	8,506	84.93%	1,509	15.07%			6,997	69.87%	10,015
Plaquemines	1,979	90.66%	204	9.34%			1,775	81.31%	2,183
Pointe Coupee	1,877	88.37%	247	11.63%			1,630	76.74%	2,124
Rapides	9,100	91.28%	869	8.72%			8,231	82.57%	9,969
Red River	1,892	89.12%	231	10.88%			1,661	78.24%	2,123
Richland	2,417	88.63%	310	11.37%			2,107	77.26%	2,727
Sabine	3,026	83.73%	588	16.27%			2,438	67.46%	3,614
Saint Bernard	1,715	93.97%	110	6.03%			1,605	87.95%	1,825
Saint Charles	1,550	91.02%	153	8.98%			1,397	82.03%	1,703
Saint Helena	1,007	92.64%	80	7.36%			927	85.28%	1,087
Saint James	1,463	74.30%	506	25.70%			957	48.60%	1,969
Saint John the Baptist	1,192	80.70%	285	19.30%			907	61.41%	1,477
Saint Landry	6,358	91.89%	561	8.11%			5,797	83.78%	6,919
Saint Martin	3,252	84.38%	602	15.62%			2,650	68.76%	3,854
Saint Mary	3,686	83.30%	739	16.70%			2,947	66.60%	4,425
Saint Tammany	4,475	87.01%	668	12.99%			3,807	74.02%	5,143
Tangipahoa	5,900	82.09%	1,284	17.87%	3	0.04%	4,616	64.23%	7,187
Tensas	957	90.97%	95	9.03%			862	81.94%	1,052
Terrebonne	3,217	84.26%	601	15.74%			2,616	68.52%	3,818
Union	2,842	88.45%	371	11.55%			2,471	76.91%	3,213
Vermilion	4,969	65.47%	2,621	34.53%			2,348	30.94%	7,590
Vernon	3,439	91.71%	311	8.29%			3,128	83.41%	3,750
Washington	6,062	95.08%	314	4.92%			5,748	90.15%	6,376
Webster	3,777	91.83%	332	8.07%	4	0.10%	3,445	83.76%	4,113
West Baton Rouge	1,185	89.37%	141	10.63%			1,044	78.73%	1,326
West Carroll	1,876	83.82%	362	16.18%			1,514	67.65%	2,238
West Feliciana	633	83.29%	127	16.71%			506	66.58%	760
Winn	2,552	86.98%	382	13.02%			2,170	73.96%	2,934
Totals	319,751	85.88%	52,446	14.09%	108	0.03%	267,305	71.80%	372,305

==== Parishes that flipped from Republican to Democratic ====
- Assumption

== See also ==
- United States presidential elections in Louisiana
