= Hillsdale, Louisiana =

Unincorporated community in Louisiana

- Unincorporated community
- Location within Louisiana Location within the United States
- Coordinates: 30°44′41″N 90°37′15″W
- Country: United States
- State: Louisiana
- Parish: St. Helena Parish
- Elevation: 154 ft (47 m)
- Time zone: UTC-6 (Central (CST))
  - Summer (DST): UTC-5 (CDT)
- ZIP code: 70422
- Area code: 225 985
- GNIS feature ID: 560966
- FIPS code: 22-34820

Hillsdale is an unincorporated community in St. Helena Parish, Louisiana, United States. The community is located less than 4 miles (6.4 kilometres) northeast of Montpelier, 6 miles (9.7 kilometres) southeast of Greensburg and 6 miles (9.7 kilometres) west of Amite City.
