= Watson, Louisiana =

- Census-designated place
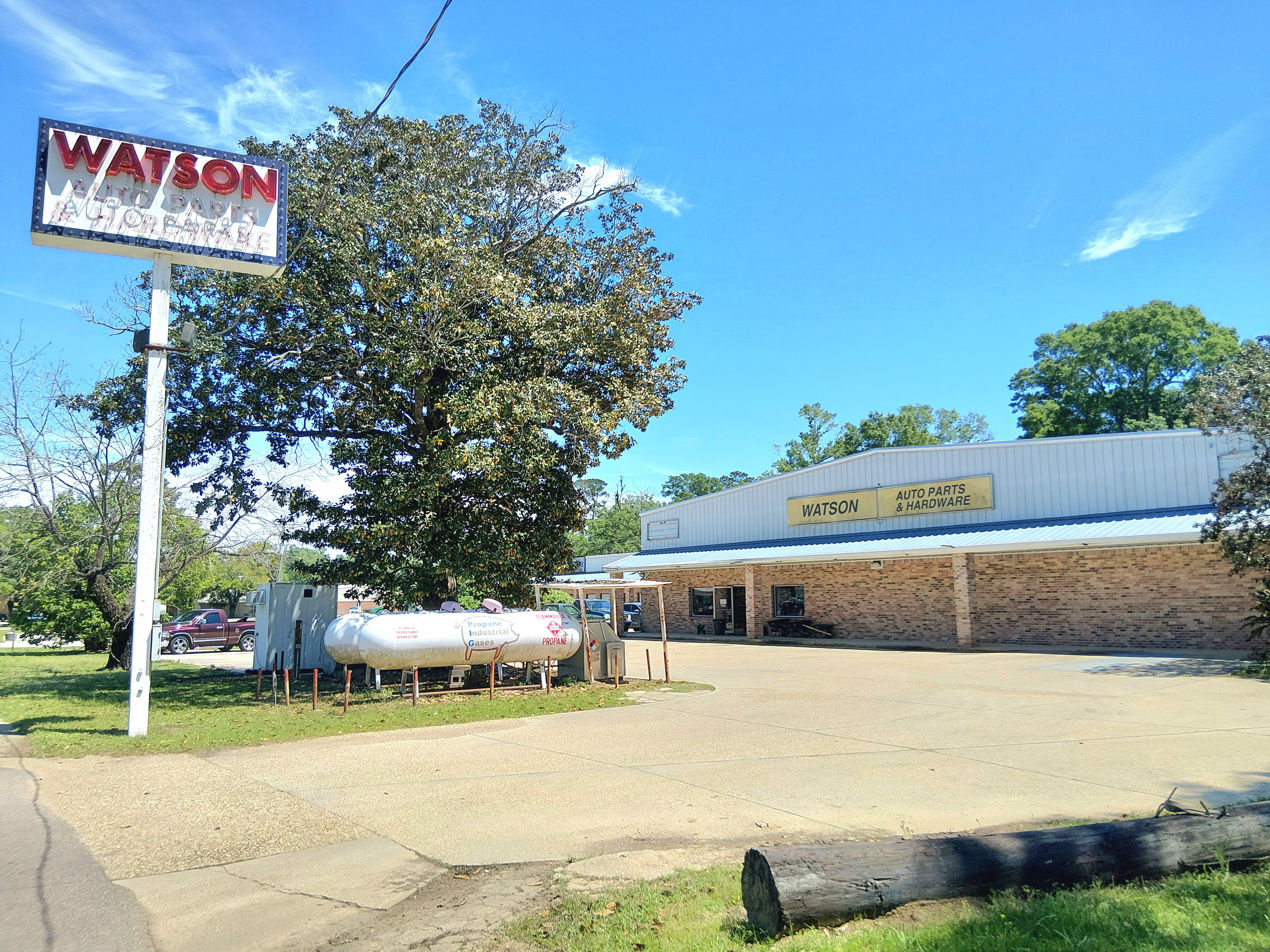
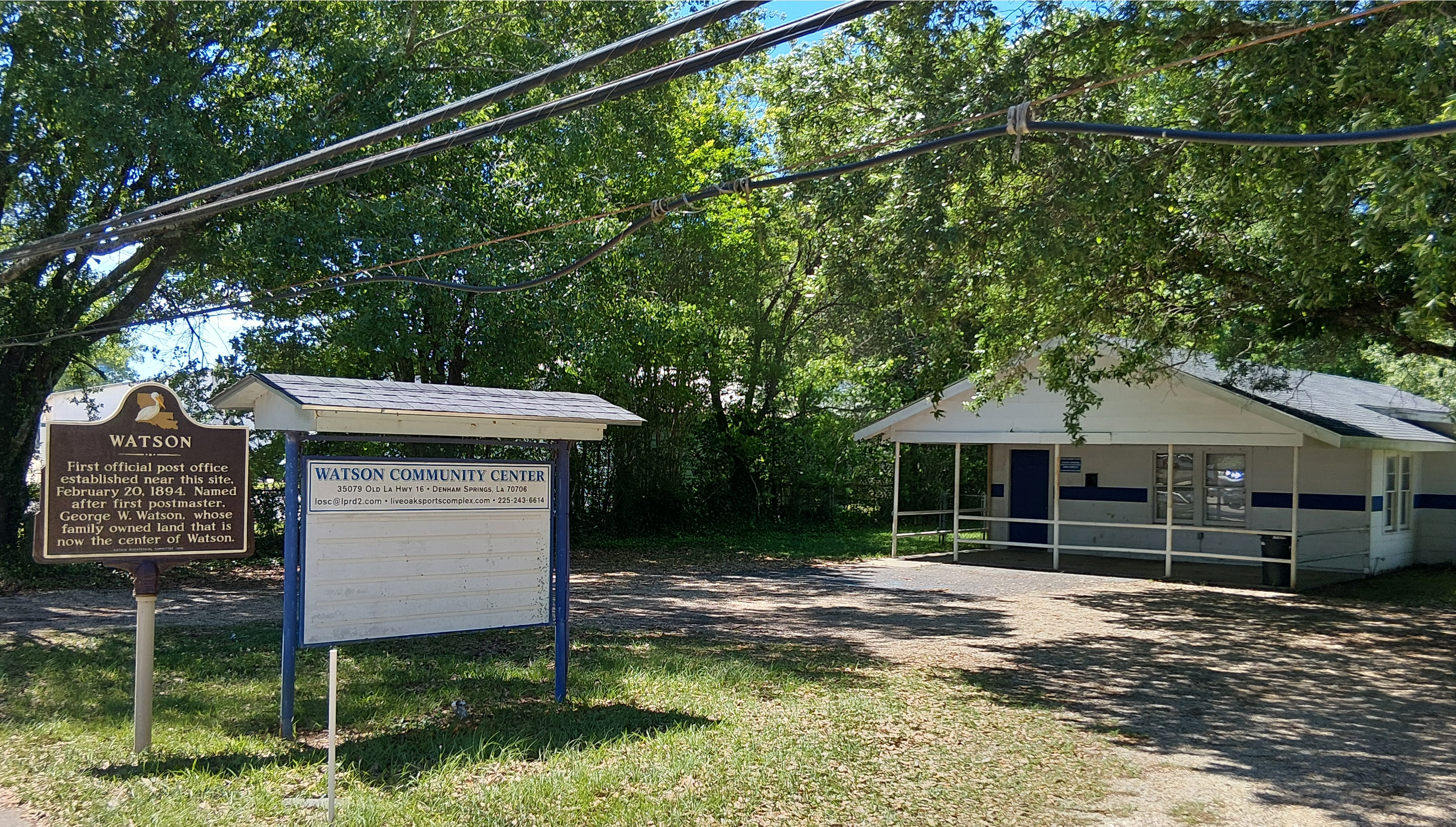
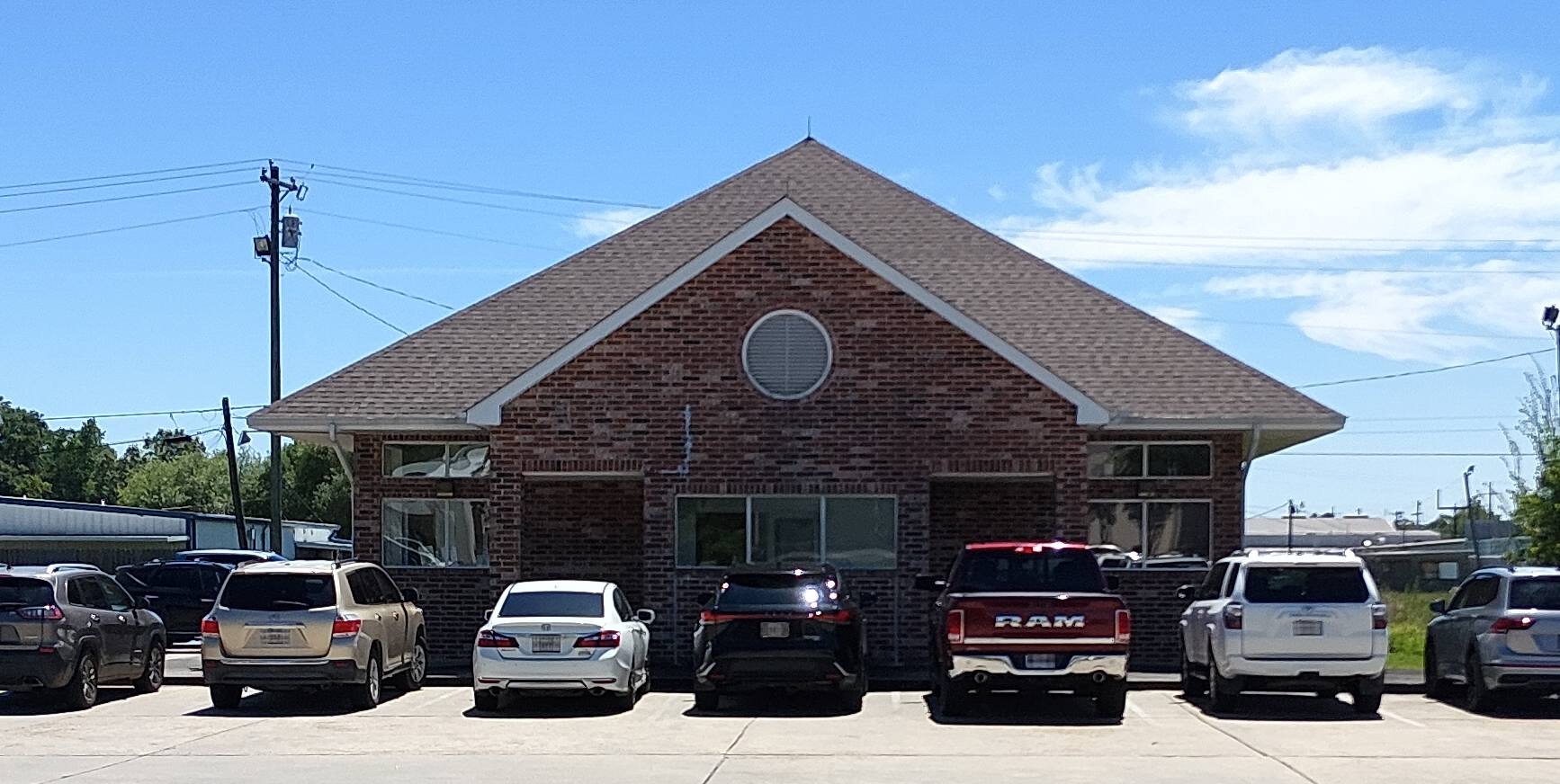
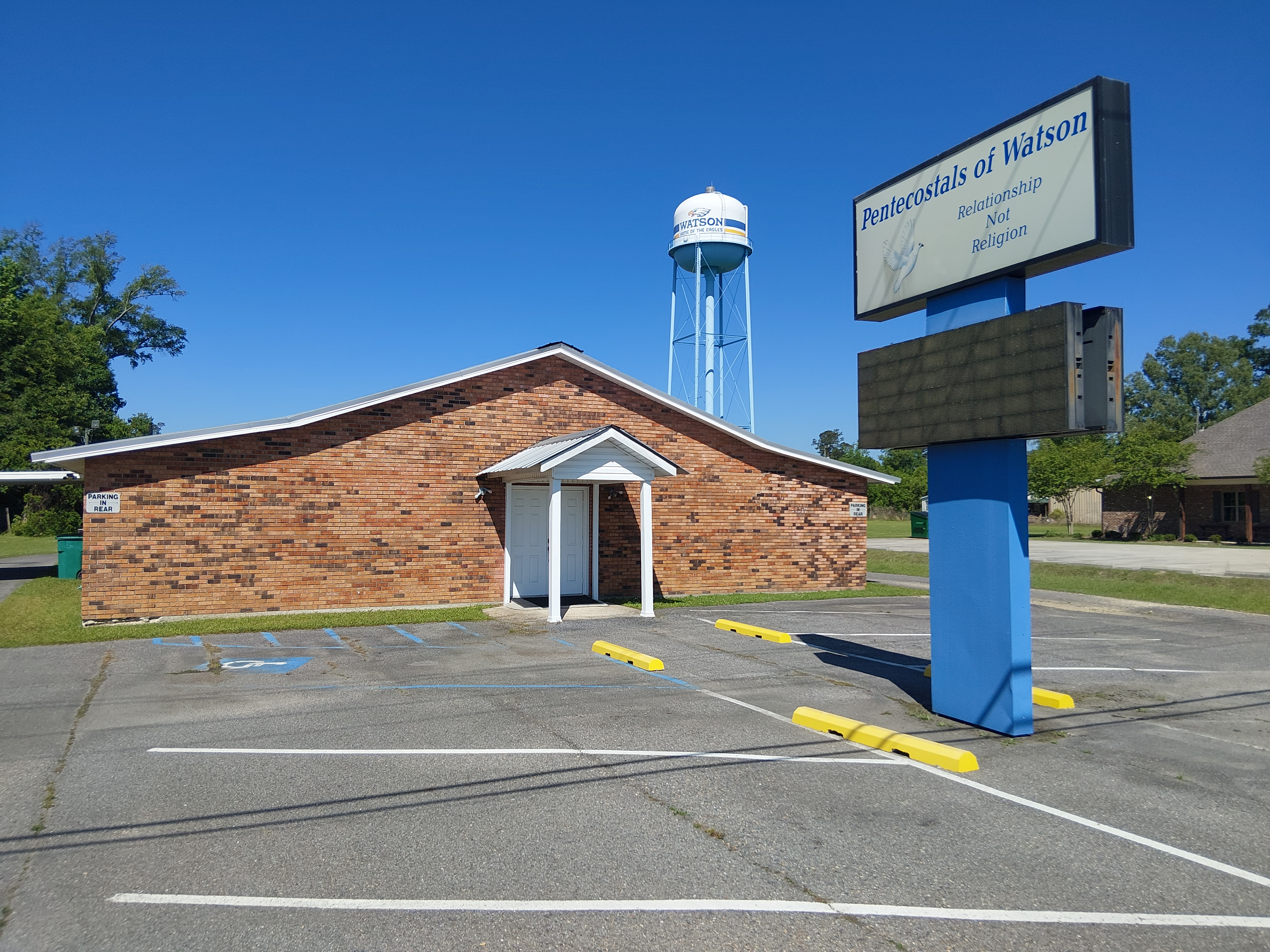
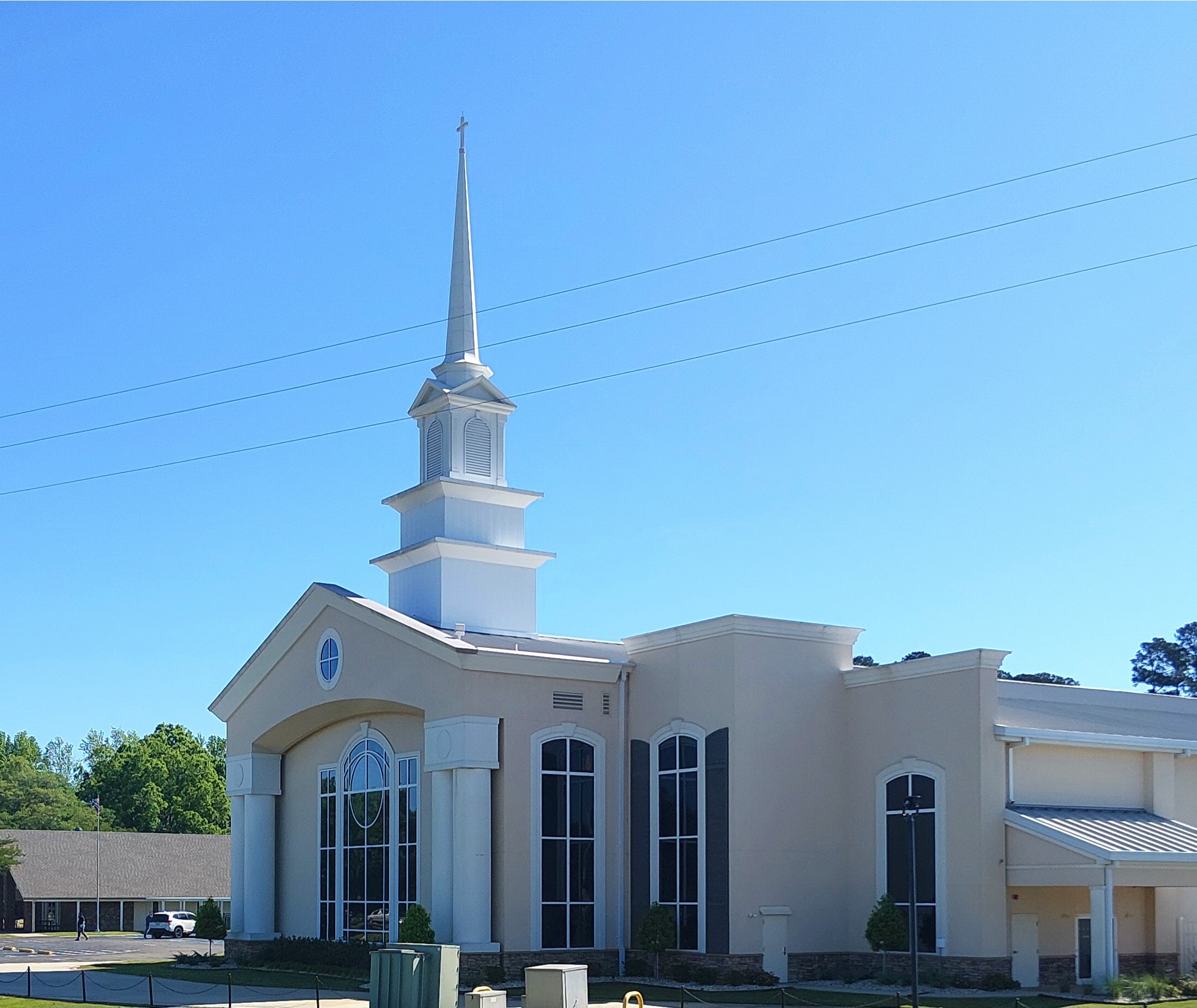
- Watson Auto Parts and Hardware Community Center Post Office Pentecostals of Watson Live Oak Church

- Location in Louisiana Location in the United States
- Coordinates: 30°34′33″N 90°57′11″W
- Country: United States
- State: Louisiana
- Parish: Livingston

Area
  - Total: 0.96 sq mi (2.48 km^{2})
  - Land: 0.96 sq mi (2.48 km^{2})
  - Water: 0 sq mi (0.00 km^{2})
- Elevation: 69 ft (21 m)

Population (2020)
  - Total: 956
  - Density: 996.8/sq mi (384.85/km^{2})
- Time zone: UTC-6 (CST)
  - Summer (DST): UTC-5 (CDT)
- ZIP Code: 70786 (PO Box); 70706 (residences and businesses)
- Area code: 225
- FIPS code: 22-80010

Watson (also known locally as Live Oak) is an unincorporated community and census-designated place (CDP) in Livingston Parish, Louisiana, United States. As of the 2020 census, Watson had a population of 956. The community is in the Baton Rouge Metropolitan Statistical Area.

== History ==
Watson Post Office was established on February 20, 1894, by George W. Watson. The first Live Oak School was a one-room cypress schoolhouse built in 1895 on land donated by Rev. Joel Ott. The school was expanded with new buildings and locations. As of 2014, Live Oak High School operates from a newer two-story building on Louisiana Highway 16. The former high school campus (near its original site across from Live Oak Hardware) was demolished to create the Live Oak Junior High.

Live Oak Church at the town's main intersection began as Live Oak Methodist Church. The first church was destroyed during the American Civil War. According to the church history, shortly after Union soldiers burned the original building, residents W.C. Newsom, Huff Jones, George Nesom, J.B. Easterly and James Chandler hand cut the lumber to lay a new foundation. In 1893, pastor J.P. Haney from the Methodist Mississippi Conference oversaw construction of a frame church that served the congregation until 1950. Two larger church buildings were built adjacent to the original Live Oak Methodist Church (now demolished). In 2022, Live Oak Church voted to break away from the United Methodist Church after the denomination began ordaining LGBTQ clergy.

Since Watson is unincorporated, Watson's ZIP code of 70786 is available only to post office box recipients. All other residences and businesses use a mailing address for Denham Springs' ZIP code of 70706.

== Geography ==
Watson is located in northwest Livingston Parish at 30°34′30″N 90°57′10″W (30.575, -90.953). The village is north of Denham Springs and is situated around the intersection of Range Road (LA 16) and Springfield Road (LA 1019). LA 16 forms the western border of the CDP; the highway leads south 6 miles (10 km) to Denham Springs and northeast 32 miles (51 km) to Amite City. Watson sits at an elevation of 65 feet (20 m).

According to the U.S. Census Bureau, the Watson CDP has an area of 0.97 square miles (2.5 km^{2}), all of it recorded as land.

=== Climate ===
Watson is located in a humid, subtropical region. The mild, short, wet, and somewhat warm winters are followed by long, hot, humid, and fairly wet summers.

== Demographics ==
Historical population
| Census | Pop. | Note | %± |
|---|---|---|---|
| 2010 | 1,047 | | — |
| 2020 | 956 | | −8.7% |
| 2024 (est.) | 1,357 | | 41.9% |
U.S. Decennial Census

Watson was first listed as a census designated place in the 2010 U.S. census.

=== Racial and ethnic composition ===
Watson CDP, Louisiana – Racial and ethnic composition Note: the US Census treats Hispanic/Latino as an ethnic category. This table excludes Latinos from the racial categories and assigns them to a separate category. Hispanics/Latinos may be of any race.
| Race / Ethnicity (NH = Non-Hispanic) | Pop 2010 | Pop 2020 | % 2010 | % 2020 |
|---|---|---|---|---|
| White alone (NH) | 848 | 1,009 | 88.70% | 96.37% |
| Black or African American alone (NH) | 20 | 14 | 2.09% | 1.34% |
| Native American or Alaska Native alone (NH) | 3 | 3 | 0.31% | 0.29% |
| Asian alone (NH) | 6 | 2 | 0.63% | 0.19% |
| Native Hawaiian or Pacific Islander alone (NH) | 1 | 0 | 0.10% | 0.00% |
| Other race alone (NH) | 2 | 2 | 0.21% | 0.19% |
| Mixed race or Multiracial (NH) | 32 | 7 | 3.35% | 0.67% |
| Hispanic or Latino (any race) | 44 | 10 | 4.60% | 0.96% |
| Total | 956 | 1,047 | 100.00% | 100.00% |

== Education ==
Watson is within the Livingston Parish Public Schools system and is served by:

- Live Oak High School
- Live Oak Junior High School
- Live Oak Middle School
- Live Oak Elementary (Watson)
- North Live Oak Elementary
- South Live Oak Elementary
