= 1936 United States presidential election in Louisiana =

- November 3, 1936

All 10 Louisiana votes to the Electoral College

Nominee	Franklin D. Roosevelt	Alf Landon
Party	Democratic	Republican
Home state	New York	Kansas
Running mate	John Nance Garner	Frank Knox
Electoral vote	10	0
Popular vote	292,894	36,791
Percentage	88.82%	11.16%
Parish results
Roosevelt
50–60%
60–70%
70–80%
80–90%
90–100%
Landon
60–70%
President before election
Franklin D. Roosevelt
Democratic
Elected President
Franklin D. Roosevelt
Democratic

The 1936 United States presidential election in Louisiana took place on November 3, 1936, as part of the 1936 United States presidential election. Louisiana voters chose ten representatives, or electors, to the Electoral College, who voted for president and vice president.

Ever since the passage of a new constitution in 1898, Louisiana had been a one-party state dominated by the Democratic Party. The Republican Party became moribund due to the disenfranchisement of Black people and the complete absence of other support bases as Louisiana completely lacked upland or German refugee whites opposed to secession. Despite this absolute single-party dominance, non-partisan tendencies remained strong among wealthy sugar planters in Acadiana and within the business elite of New Orleans.

Until the rise of Huey P. Long, post-disenfranchisement Louisiana politics was dominated by the New Orleans–based “Choctaw Club”, which overcame Socialist, Wobbly, and Progressive challenges from the outlying upcountry, Imperial Calcasieu and Acadiana regions between the late 1900s and early 1920s. The three presidential elections between 1916 and 1924 saw a rebellion in Acadiana over sugar tariffs and Woodrow Wilson’s foreign and domestic policies; however, the nomination of Catholic Al Smith in 1928 rapidly restored their Democratic loyalty without causing significant upheaval in the remainder of the state, which was too focused on control of black labour to worry about Smith’s Catholicism.

Following the 1928 gubernatorial primary, Louisiana politics until Brown v. Board of Education would be governed by a system of coherent “Long” and “anti-Long” Democratic factionalism, as the administration of Huey Long introduced significant economic reforms, which were strongly opposed by the remnants of the old Choctaws. During the first term of Roosevelt, Long sought to capture the Presidency for himself under a “Share-Our-Wealth” program involving the confiscation of wealthy fortunes, family allowances, and government storage of agricultural surpluses. However, in the ensuing years Long's fortunes dwindled as a result of 1934 losses in the Sixth Congressional District and the New Orleans city council, before Senator Long launched a siege on New Orleans and the Choctaws, combined with abolition of the state's poll tax, in effort to regain his control over the state.

However, Long's assassination in 1935 meant he could not launch any presidential campaign. Although the sugar parishes did oppose incumbent President Franklin D. Roosevelt’s tariff policy strongly, with the result that frequently rebellious Assumption and Lafourche Parishes showed a strong swing to Republican nominees Governor Alf Landon and veteran Illinois operative Frank Knox, Louisiana was won by Roosevelt and Vice President John Nance Garner, with 88.82 percent of the popular vote, against Landon’s 11.16 percent. By percentage of the popular vote won, Louisiana was Roosevelt's third-best state, behind only South Carolina (98.57 percent) and Mississippi (97.06 percent).

== Results ==
1936 United States presidential election in Louisiana
Party	Candidate	Votes	%
Democratic	Franklin D. Roosevelt (inc.)	292,894	88.82%
Republican	Alf Landon	36,791	11.16%
Write-ins	—	93	0.03%
Total votes		329,778	100%

=== Results by parish ===
1936 United States presidential election in Louisiana by parish
Parish	Franklin Delano Roosevelt Democratic		Alfred Mossman Landon Republican		Various candidates Write-ins		Margin		Total votes cast
Parish	#	%	#	%	#	%	#	%	Total votes cast
Acadia	4,504	91.08%	441	8.92%			4,063	82.16%	4,945
Allen	2,207	87.20%	324	12.80%			1,883	74.40%	2,531
Ascension	2,359	87.05%	350	12.92%	1	0.04%	2,009	74.13%	2,710
Assumption	712	39.06%	1,111	60.94%			-399	-21.89%	1,823
Avoyelles	4,408	90.70%	452	9.30%			3,956	81.40%	4,860
Beauregard	2,181	79.89%	549	20.11%			1,632	59.78%	2,730
Bienville	2,593	92.38%	213	7.59%	1	0.04%	2,380	84.79%	2,807
Bossier	1,975	91.01%	193	8.89%	2	0.09%	1,782	82.12%	2,170
Caddo	12,156	87.72%	1,697	12.25%	4	0.03%	10,459	75.48%	13,857
Calcasieu	6,259	85.63%	1,037	14.19%	13	0.18%	5,222	71.45%	7,309
Caldwell	1,371	85.37%	235	14.63%			1,136	70.73%	1,606
Cameron	1,067	98.52%	16	1.48%			1,051	97.05%	1,083
Catahoula	1,363	93.29%	98	6.71%			1,265	86.58%	1,461
Claiborne	2,563	94.54%	146	5.39%	2	0.07%	2,417	89.16%	2,711
Concordia	1,152	95.13%	58	4.79%	1	0.08%	1,094	90.34%	1,211
De Soto	2,337	96.17%	93	3.83%			2,244	92.35%	2,430
East Baton Rouge	9,911	90.26%	1,069	9.74%			8,842	80.53%	10,980
East Carroll	811	89.51%	95	10.49%			716	79.03%	906
East Feliciana	1,057	91.20%	102	8.80%			955	82.40%	1,159
Evangeline	3,484	91.32%	331	8.68%			3,153	82.65%	3,815
Franklin	2,948	92.50%	231	7.25%	8	0.25%	2,717	85.25%	3,187
Grant	1,847	78.33%	511	21.67%			1,336	56.66%	2,358
Iberia	2,595	67.77%	1,234	32.23%			1,361	35.54%	3,829
Iberville	1,953	88.13%	263	11.87%			1,690	76.26%	2,216
Jackson	1,807	91.45%	169	8.55%			1,638	82.89%	1,976
Jefferson	9,056	92.72%	705	7.22%	6	0.06%	8,351	85.50%	9,767
Jefferson Davis	2,567	80.85%	608	19.15%			1,959	61.70%	3,175
Lafayette	4,570	93.72%	306	6.28%			4,264	87.45%	4,876
Lafourche	2,195	57.36%	1,630	42.59%	2	0.05%	565	14.76%	3,827
LaSalle	1,643	86.52%	256	13.48%			1,387	73.04%	1,899
Lincoln	2,154	91.43%	201	8.53%	1	0.04%	1,953	82.89%	2,356
Livingston	2,414	82.96%	496	17.04%			1,918	65.91%	2,910
Madison	1,085	93.86%	71	6.14%			1,014	87.72%	1,156
Morehouse	2,514	93.53%	172	6.40%	2	0.07%	2,342	87.13%	2,688
Natchitoches	3,476	87.38%	502	12.62%			2,974	74.76%	3,978
Orleans	108,012	91.32%	10,254	8.67%	16	0.01%	97,758	82.65%	118,282
Ouachita	7,635	87.28%	1,113	12.72%			6,522	74.55%	8,748
Plaquemines	2,209	95.92%	94	4.08%			2,115	91.84%	2,303
Pointe Coupee	1,419	92.44%	116	7.56%			1,303	84.89%	1,535
Rapides	8,017	86.45%	1,257	13.55%			6,760	72.89%	9,274
Red River	1,641	92.55%	132	7.45%			1,509	85.11%	1,773
Richland	2,425	93.48%	165	6.36%	4	0.15%	2,260	87.12%	2,594
Sabine	2,447	85.41%	417	14.55%	1	0.03%	2,030	70.86%	2,865
Saint Bernard	2,269	98.91%	25	1.09%			2,244	97.82%	2,294
Saint Charles	1,503	94.00%	96	6.00%			1,407	87.99%	1,599
Saint Helena	1,199	92.16%	102	7.84%			1,097	84.32%	1,301
Saint James	1,575	85.88%	259	14.12%			1,316	71.76%	1,834
Saint John the Baptist	1,742	86.93%	262	13.07%			1,480	73.85%	2,004
Saint Landry	5,639	92.75%	441	7.25%			5,198	85.49%	6,080
Saint Martin	2,638	96.35%	100	3.65%			2,538	92.70%	2,738
Saint Mary	1,942	79.95%	487	20.05%			1,455	59.90%	2,429
Saint Tammany	3,477	85.41%	594	14.59%			2,883	70.82%	4,071
Tangipahoa	4,624	77.07%	1,374	22.90%	2	0.03%	3,250	54.17%	6,000
Tensas	812	97.25%	23	2.75%			789	94.49%	835
Terrebonne	1,894	78.26%	526	21.74%			1,368	56.53%	2,420
Union	1,778	86.73%	272	13.27%			1,506	73.46%	2,050
Vermilion	4,141	89.02%	496	10.66%	15	0.32%	3,645	78.35%	4,652
Vernon	2,831	75.21%	928	24.65%	5	0.13%	1,903	50.56%	3,764
Washington	5,667	94.18%	350	5.82%			5,317	88.37%	6,017
Webster	2,799	90.12%	301	9.69%	6	0.19%	2,498	80.42%	3,106
West Baton Rouge	868	91.46%	80	8.43%	1	0.11%	788	83.03%	949
West Carroll	1,440	86.12%	232	13.88%			1,208	72.25%	1,672
West Feliciana	564	88.13%	76	11.88%			488	76.25%	640
Winn	2,393	90.40%	254	9.60%			2,139	80.81%	2,647
Totals	292,894	88.82%	36,791	11.16%	93	0.03%	256,103	77.66%	329,778

==== Parishes that flipped from Democratic to Republican ====
- Assumption

== See also ==
- United States presidential elections in Louisiana
