= List of highways numbered 648 =

The following highways are numbered 648:

== United States ==
- LA 648
- MD 648
- PR-648

Preceded by 647	Lists of highways 648	Succeeded by 649
