= List of highways numbered 647 =

The following highways are numbered 647:

== Canada ==
- Alberta Highway 647
- Ontario Highway 647
- Saskatchewan Highway 647

== United States ==
- SR 647
- SR 647
- PR-647

Preceded by 646	Lists of highways 647	Succeeded by 648
