= Kedron, Louisiana =

Unincorporated community in Louisiana

- Unincorporated community
- Location within Louisiana Location within the United States
- Coordinates: 30°45′24″N 90°34′38″W
- Country: United States
- State: Louisiana
- Parish: St. Helena Parish
- Elevation: 148 ft (45 m)
- Time zone: UTC-6 (Central (CST))
  - Summer (DST): UTC-5 (CDT)
- ZIP code: 70422
- Area code: 225 985
- GNIS feature ID: 1629287
- FIPS code: 22-39125

Kedron is an unincorporated community in St. Helena Parish, Louisiana, United States. The community is located less than 4 miles (6.4 kilometres) northwest of Amite City and 3 miles (4.8 kilometres) west of Roseland.
