= Belle Rose, Louisiana =

- Census-designated place
- Location of Belle Rose in Louisiana
- Coordinates: 30°02′13″N 91°03′15″W
- Country: United States
- State: Louisiana
- Parish: Assumption

Area
  - Total: 5.36 sq mi (13.89 km^{2})
  - Land: 5.36 sq mi (13.89 km^{2})
  - Water: 0 sq mi (0.00 km^{2})
- Elevation: 20 ft (6.1 m)

Population (2020)
  - Total: 1,698
  - Density: 316.5/sq mi (122.21/km^{2})
- Time zone: UTC-6 (CST)
  - Summer (DST): UTC-5 (CDT)
- ZIP code: 70341
- Area code: 225
- FIPS code: 22-06260

Belle Rose is a census-designated place (CDP) in Assumption Parish, Louisiana, United States. As of the 2020 census, Belle Rose had a population of 1,698. It is part of the Pierre Part micropolitan statistical area.

== Geography ==
Belle Rose is located at 30°2′13″N 91°3′15″W (30.036834, -91.054039).

According to the United States Census Bureau, the CDP has a total area of 5.4 square miles (13.9 km^{2}), all land.

== Demographics ==
Historical population
Census	Pop.	Note	%±
2000	1,944		—
2010	1,902		−2.2%
2020	1,698		−10.7%
U.S. Decennial Census

Belle Rose was first listed as a census designated place in the 2000 U.S. census.

Belle Rose CDP, Louisiana – Racial and ethnic composition Note: the US Census treats Hispanic/Latino as an ethnic category. This table excludes Latinos from the racial categories and assigns them to a separate category. Hispanics/Latinos may be of any race.
Race / Ethnicity (NH = Non-Hispanic)	Pop 2000	Pop 2010	Pop 2020	% 2000	% 2010	% 2020
White alone (NH)	766	777	721	39.40%	40.85%	42.46%
Black or African American alone (NH)	1,149	1,104	907	59.10%	58.04%	53.42%
Native American or Alaska Native alone (NH)	1	3	0	0.05%	0.16%	0.00%
Asian alone (NH)	0	0	0	0.00%	0.00%	0.00%
Native Hawaiian or Pacific Islander alone (NH)	0	2	0	0.00%	0.11%	0.00%
Other race alone (NH)	0	0	0	0.00%	0.00%	0.00%
Mixed race or Multiracial (NH)	2	8	24	0.10%	0.42%	1.41%
Hispanic or Latino (any race)	26	8	46	1.34%	0.42%	2.71%
Total	1,944	1,902	1,698	100.00%	100.00%	100.00%
