= Assumption Parish, Louisiana =

Parish in Louisiana, United States

Assumption Parish
- Parish
- Parish of Assumption; Paroisse de l'Assomption (French); Parroquia de la Asunción (Spanish)
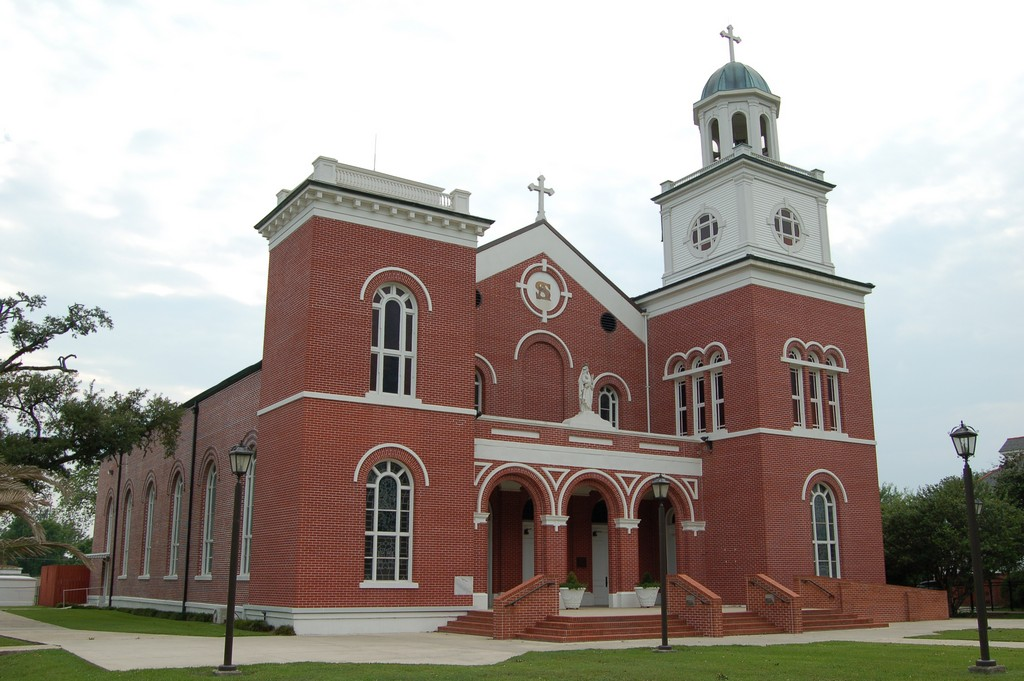
- St. Anne Catholic Church in Napoleonville

- Location within the U.S. state of Louisiana
- Coordinates: 29°54′N 91°04′W
- Country: United States
- State: Louisiana
- Founded: 1807
- Named for: Assumption Catholic Parish
- Seat: Napoleonville
- Largest community: Pierre Part

Area
  - Total: 365 sq mi (950 km^{2})
  - Land: 339 sq mi (880 km^{2})
  - Water: 26 sq mi (67 km^{2}) 7.1%

Population (2020)
  - Total: 21,039
  - Estimate (2025): 19,720 ▼
  - Density: 62.1/sq mi (24.0/km^{2})
- Time zone: UTC−6 (Central)
  - Summer (DST): UTC−5 (CDT)
- Congressional districts: 2nd, 6th
- Website: www.assumptionla.com

Assumption Parish (French: Paroisse de l'Assomption, Spanish: Parroquia de la Asunción) is a parish located in the U.S. state of Louisiana. As of the 2020 census, the population was 21,039. Its parish seat is Napoleonville. Assumption Parish was established in 1807, as one of the original parishes of the Territory of Orleans.

Assumption Parish is one of the twenty-two Acadiana parishes. Its major product is sugar cane. In proportion to its area, Assumption Parish produces the most sugar of any parish of Louisiana.

== History ==
In 1807, Assumption became the eighth parish of the Orleans Territory. Its history is rooted in its waterways and its large expanse of fertile soils ideal for farming. Settled in the middle 18th century by French and Spanish settlers, the area retains strong cultural ties to its past with conversational French still common among residents. Assumption was also a final destination for many of the French Acadians exiled from Nova Scotia between 1755 and 1764.

In 1863 Abraham Lincoln mentioned Assumption Parish in the Emancipation Proclamation as a confederate parish.

== Geography ==
According to the U.S. Census Bureau, the parish has a total area of 365 square miles (950 km^{2}), of which 339 square miles (880 km^{2}) is land and 26 square miles (67 km^{2}) (7.1%) is water.

=== Major highways ===
- Future Interstate 49
- U.S. Highway 90
- Louisiana Highway 1
- Louisiana Highway 69
- Louisiana Highway 70
- Louisiana Highway 182
- Louisiana Highway 308
- Louisiana Highway 398
- Louisiana Highway 400
- Louisiana Highway 401
- Louisiana Highway 402
- Louisiana Highway 403
- Louisiana Highway 662
- Louisiana Highway 663
- Louisiana Highway 996
- Louisiana Highway 998
- Louisiana Highway 999
- Louisiana Highway 1000
- Louisiana Highway 1001
- Louisiana Highway 1003
- Louisiana Highway 1004
- Louisiana Highway 1005
- Louisiana Highway 1006
- Louisiana Highway 1007
- Louisiana Highway 1008
- Louisiana Highway 1010
- Louisiana Highway 1011
- Louisiana Highway 1012
- Louisiana Highway 1013
- Louisiana Highway 1014
- Louisiana Highway 1015-1
- Louisiana Highway 1015-2
- Louisiana Highway 1016-1
- Louisiana Highway 1016-2
- Louisiana Highway 1247

=== Adjacent parishes ===
- Iberville Parish (north)
- Ascension Parish (north)
- St. James Parish (northeast)
- Lafourche Parish (east)
- Terrebonne Parish (southeast)
- St. Mary Parish (southwest)
- Iberia Parish (northwest)
- St. Martin Parish (west)

== Communities ==
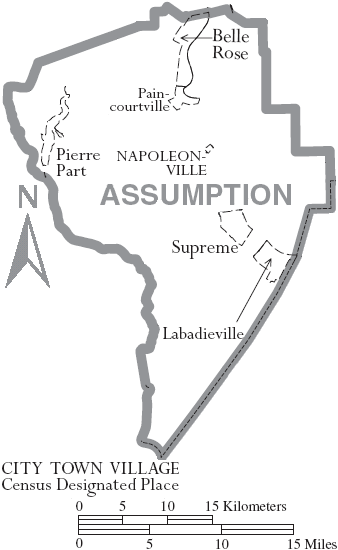
Map of Assumption Parish, with municipal labels

=== Village ===
- Napoleonville (parish seat and only municipality)

=== Census-designated places ===
- Bayou Corne
- Bayou L'Ourse
- Belle Rose
- Labadieville
- Paincourtville
- Pierre Part
- Supreme

=== Other unincorporated communities ===
- Albemarle
- Belle Alliance
- Belle River
- Bruly St. Martin
- Cancienne
- Foley
- Klotzville
- Plattenville
- Westfield
- Wildwood
- Woodlawn

== Demographics ==
Historical population
Census	Pop.	Note	%±
1810	2,472		—
1820	3,576		44.7%
1830	5,669		58.5%
1840	7,141		26.0%
1850	10,538		47.6%
1860	15,379		45.9%
1870	13,234		−13.9%
1880	17,010		28.5%
1890	19,629		15.4%
1900	21,620		10.1%
1910	24,128		11.6%
1920	17,912		−25.8%
1930	15,990		−10.7%
1940	18,541		16.0%
1950	17,278		−6.8%
1960	17,991		4.1%
1970	19,654		9.2%
1980	22,084		12.4%
1990	22,753		3.0%
2000	23,388		2.8%
2010	23,421		0.1%
2020	21,039		−10.2%
2025 (est.)	19,720	▼	−6.3%
U.S. Decennial Census; 1790-1960 1900-1990; 1990-2000 2010

Assumption Parish, Louisiana – Racial and ethnic composition Note: the US Census treats Hispanic/Latino as an ethnic category. This table excludes Latinos from the racial categories and assigns them to a separate category. Hispanics/Latinos may be of any race.
Race / Ethnicity (NH = Non-Hispanic)	Pop 1980	Pop 1990	Pop 2000	Pop 2010	Pop 2020	% 1980	% 1990	% 2000	% 2010	% 2020
White alone (NH)	14,576	15,033	15,565	15,442	13,580	66.00%	66.07%	66.55%	65.93%	64.55%
Black or African American alone (NH)	6,941	7,308	7,303	7,111	5,973	31.43%	32.12%	31.23%	30.36%	28.39%
Native American or Alaska Native alone (NH)	21	44	67	132	83	0.10%	0.19%	0.29%	0.56%	0.39%
Asian alone (NH)	24	72	53	56	56	0.11%	0.32%	0.23%	0.24%	0.27%
Native Hawaiian or Pacific Islander alone (NH)	x	x	0	11	0	x	x	0.00%	0.05%	0.00%
Other race alone (NH)	5	4	2	4	17	0.02%	0.02%	0.01%	0.02%	0.08%
Mixed race or Multiracial (NH)	x	x	114	167	416	x	x	0.49%	0.71%	1.98%
Hispanic or Latino (any race)	517	292	284	498	914	2.34%	1.28%	1.21%	2.13%	4.34%
Total	22,084	22,753	23,388	23,421	21,039	100.00%	100.00%	100.00%	100.00%	100.00%

As of the 2020 United States census, there were 21,039 people, 8,552 households, and 5,484 families residing in the parish. During the 2010 United States census, there were 23,421 people living in the parish. Among its 2010 population, 66.8% were White, 30.5% Black or African American, 0.6% Native American, 0.2% Asian, 0.1% Pacific Islander, 1.0% of some other race and 0.9% of two or more races. 2.1% were Hispanic or Latino (of any race). 38.2% were of French, French Canadian or Cajun and 9.4% American ancestry.

== Education ==
The Assumption Parish School Board operates local public schools. Assumption High School serves the whole parish. There is one private school in the parish, Saint Elizabeth School, which was founded in 1834.

- Assumption High School
- Bayou L'Ourse Primary School
- Belle Rose Middle School
- Belle Rose Primary School
- Labadieville Middle School
- Labadieville Primary School
- Napoleonville Middle School
- Napoleonville Primary School
- Pierre Part Elementary School
- Saint Elizabeth School

== National Guard ==
The 928th Sapper Company, a unit of the 769th Engineer Battalion and the 225th Engineer Brigade.

== Politics ==
Assumption Parish is represented in the Louisiana House of Representatives by Beryl Amedee, a Republican, and Chad Brown, a Democrat. During the "Solid South" era, conflicts over trade policy often caused Assumption Parish to deviate somewhat from overwhelming Democratic support, as did rebellion in the Acadiana region against Woodrow Wilson's perceived hostility towards France.

Since the Dixiecrat revolt, by contrast, Assumption has been a typical rural South Louisiana parish in its political behaviour. It backed Dixiecrat Strom Thurmond in 1948 and Dwight D. Eisenhower in 1956 before showing powerful pro-Catholic behaviour in 1960 and then turning powerfully against liberal Midwestern Democrats in 1968 and 1972. With the nomination of the more centrist Southerner Jimmy Carter in 1976, Assumption became again Democratic leaning until the 2000s, when, like all of the rural white South, it has turned powerfully Republican.

United States presidential election results for Assumption Parish, Louisiana
Year	Republican		Democratic		Third party(ies)	
Year	No.	%	No.	%	No.	%
1912	149	20.03%	423	56.85%	172	23.12%
1916	221	20.41%	489	45.15%	373	34.44%
1920	725	78.21%	202	21.79%	0	0.00%
1924	601	66.34%	305	33.66%	0	0.00%
1928	307	24.46%	948	75.54%	0	0.00%
1932	386	20.06%	1,538	79.94%	0	0.00%
1936	1,111	60.94%	712	39.06%	0	0.00%
1940	722	29.10%	1,759	70.90%	0	0.00%
1944	426	23.09%	1,419	76.91%	0	0.00%
1948	469	25.57%	362	19.74%	1,003	54.69%
1952	1,210	42.35%	1,647	57.65%	0	0.00%
1956	1,708	55.17%	1,282	41.41%	106	3.42%
1960	766	18.19%	3,019	71.69%	426	10.12%
1964	2,112	40.87%	3,056	59.13%	0	0.00%
1968	1,222	19.69%	2,085	33.60%	2,898	46.70%
1972	3,751	58.93%	2,065	32.44%	549	8.63%
1976	3,117	40.42%	4,401	57.07%	193	2.50%
1980	4,001	44.10%	4,679	51.57%	393	4.33%
1984	5,433	52.43%	4,660	44.97%	270	2.61%
1988	4,017	40.19%	5,610	56.13%	368	3.68%
1992	2,928	28.01%	5,639	53.95%	1,886	18.04%
1996	2,698	26.42%	6,416	62.83%	1,098	10.75%
2000	4,388	43.65%	5,222	51.94%	443	4.41%
2004	4,966	46.26%	5,585	52.03%	184	1.71%
2008	5,981	54.57%	4,756	43.39%	223	2.03%
2012	6,083	55.34%	4,754	43.25%	155	1.41%
2016	6,714	61.57%	3,931	36.05%	259	2.38%
2020	7,271	64.72%	3,833	34.12%	131	1.17%
2024	6,963	67.17%	3,273	31.57%	131	1.26%

== Notable people ==
- Kim Willoughby, American indoor volleyball player, 2008 U.S. volleyball Olympian, former University of Hawaiʻi volleyball player, 2003 AVCA NCAA National Player of the Year
- Charles Melançon, former Democratic member of the United States House of Representatives
- Troy E. Brown, a former member of the Louisiana State Senate
- Brandon Jacobs, two-time Super bowl winner, former running back for the New York Giants
- Johnny Meads, is a former professional American football linebacker in the National Football League Houston Oilers Washington Redskins
- J. E. Jumonville Sr., was a businessman, farmer, and horse breeder born in Paincourtville state senator
- Samuel A. LeBlanc I, was a lawyer from Napoleonville born in Paincourtville in Assumption Parish
- Whitmell P. Martin, was a U.S. Representative from Assumption Parish Louisiana from 1915 to 1929.

== See also ==
- Bayou Corne sinkhole
- National Register of Historic Places listings in Assumption Parish, Louisiana
- Isleños in Louisiana#Valenzuela
- Troy E. Brown
- Samuel A. LeBlanc I
- J. E. Jumonville Sr.
