= Denson, Louisiana =

Unincorporated community in Louisiana

- Unincorporated community
- Location within Louisiana Location within the United States
- Coordinates: 30°15′53″N 90°38′02″W
- Country: United States
- State: Louisiana
- Parish: Livingston
- Elevation: 3 ft (0.91 m)
- Time zone: UTC-6 (Central (CST))
  - Summer (DST): UTC-5 (CDT)
- ZIP code: 70449
- Area code: 225
- GNIS feature ID: 554226
- FIPS code: 22-20505

Denson also known as Bear Island is an unincorporated community in Livingston Parish, Louisiana, United States. The community is located 2 miles (3.2 kilometres) southeast of Maurepas and 6 miles (9.7 kilometres) southwest of Killian north of the Blind River.

== History ==
A man named Callie Denson Moore founded the local post office and was appointed postmaster on June 8, 1903.
