= Cancienne, Louisiana =

Unincorporated community in Louisiana

- Unincorporated community
- Location within Louisiana Location within the United States
- Coordinates: 29°54′01″N 91°01′32″W
- Country: United States
- State: Louisiana
- Parish: Assumption
- Elevation: 10 ft (3.0 m)
- Time zone: UTC-6 (Central (CST))
  - Summer (DST): UTC-5 (CDT)
- ZIP code: 70390
- Area code: 985
- GNIS feature ID: 543457
- FIPS code: 22-12325

Cancienne is a populated place located within the Parish Governing Authority District 5, a minor civil division of Assumption Parish, Louisiana.

The elevation of Cancienne is 10 feet and Cancienne appears on the Napoleonville U.S. Geological Survey Map.

== Features ==
Cancienne Canal is a water feature in Assumption Parish that is interconnected with Lake Verret. In 2019, as part of the Louisiana Watershed Initiative, bids opened for the Cancienne Canal Improvements Project.

The largest community within a 50-mile radius is Baton Rouge, which It is located about 38 miles to the north of Cancienne.

It is a popular spot for birdwatching.
