= 1920 United States presidential election in Louisiana =

- November 2, 1920

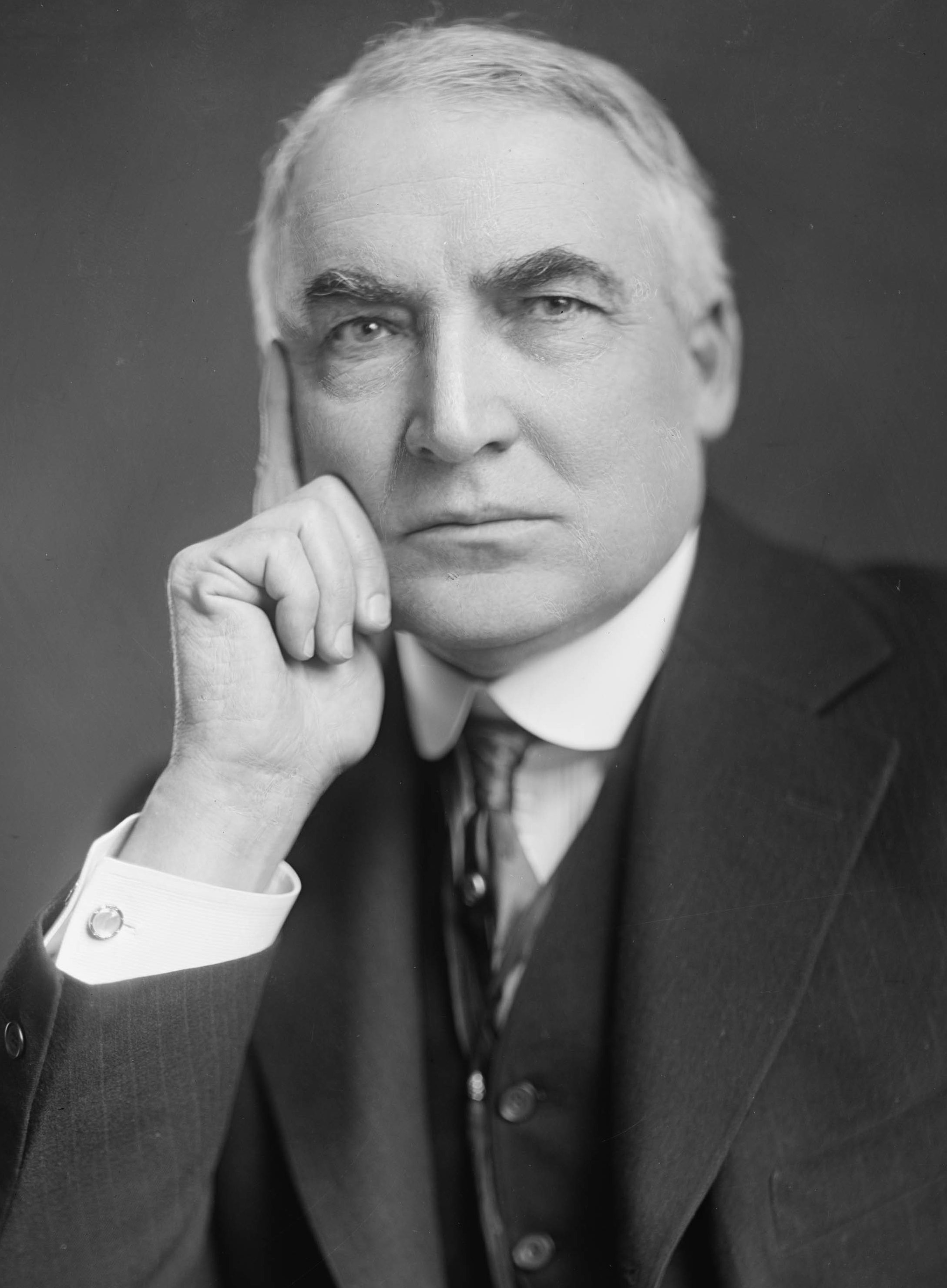
Nominee	James M. Cox	Warren G. Harding
Party	Democratic	Republican
Home state	Ohio	Ohio
Running mate	Franklin D. Roosevelt	Calvin Coolidge
Electoral vote	10	0
Popular vote	87,519	38,538
Percentage	69.24%	30.49%
Parish results
Cox
50–60%
60–70%
70–80%
80–90%
90–100%
Harding
50–60%
60–70%
70–80%
President before election
Woodrow Wilson
Democratic
Elected President
Warren G. Harding
Republican

The 1920 United States presidential election in Louisiana took place on November 2, 1920, as part of the 1920 United States presidential election. Voters chose ten representatives, or electors to the Electoral College, who voted for president and vice president.

Ever since the passage of a new constitution in 1898, Louisiana had been a one-party state dominated by the Democratic Party. The Republican Party became moribund due to the disenfranchisement of blacks and the complete absence of other support bases as Louisiana completely lacked upland or German refugee whites opposed to secession. Despite this absolute single-party dominance, non-partisan tendencies remained strong among wealthy sugar planters in Acadiana and within the business elite of New Orleans.

Following disfranchisement, the state's politics became dominated by the Choctaw Club of Louisiana, generally called the “Old Regulars”. This political machine was based in New Orleans and united with Black Belt cotton planters. Opposition began to emerge with the Progressive movement in the 1910s, chiefly in the southern sugar-growing parishes, where conflicts with President Wilson's Underwoood-Simmons Act even allowed a Progressive Party member in Whitmell P. Martin (Note: Martin would join the Democratic Party in 1919.) to be elected to the Third Congressional District in 1914. Continued opposition to the Choctaws would elect the reformer John M. Parker, originally part of Theodore Roosevelt's Bull Moose Party, as governor at the beginning of 1920.

During the second term of President Wilson, the Acadian parishes became even more upset with him because of his deep disagreements with Georges Clemenceau, as well as continued problems with the issue of sugar tariffs. There was also strong opposition is this part of Louisiana to the Nineteenth Amendment, and also substantial opposition in the Black Belt of the state because it was believed that enfranchising women could interfere with lily-white politics. In the Ozark- and previously Socialist-influenced northern upcountry parishes, opposition to women's suffrage was much weaker.

== Results ==
Presidential Candidate	Running Mate	Party	Electoral Vote (EV)	Popular Vote (PV)	
James M. Cox of Ohio	Franklin D. Roosevelt	Democratic	10	87,519	69.24%
Warren Harding	Calvin Coolidge	Republican	0	38,538	30.49%
Write-ins	—	Independent Republican	0	339	0.27%

=== Results by parish ===
1920 United States presidential election in Louisiana by parish
Parish	James Middleton Cox Democratic		Warren Gamaliel Harding Republican		Write-ins Independent Republican		Margin		Total votes cast
Parish	#	%	#	%	#	%	#	%	Total votes cast
Acadia	1,058	47.98%	1,141	51.75%	6	0.27%	-83	-3.76%	2,205
Allen	1,008	80.64%	242	19.36%			766	61.28%	1,250
Ascension	622	55.64%	496	44.36%			126	11.27%	1,118
Assumption	202	21.79%	725	78.21%			-523	-56.42%	927
Avoyelles	1,422	66.26%	724	33.74%			698	32.53%	2,146
Beauregard	1,146	84.14%	202	14.83%	14	1.03%	944	69.31%	1,362
Bienville	1,419	83.27%	257	15.08%	28	1.64%	1,162	68.19%	1,704
Bossier	731	94.32%	44	5.68%			687	88.65%	775
Caddo	4,264	91.40%	401	8.60%			3,863	82.81%	4,665
Calcasieu	2,480	83.33%	483	16.23%	13	0.44%	1,997	67.10%	2,976
Caldwell	539	80.81%	128	19.19%			411	61.62%	667
Cameron	146	92.99%	11	7.01%			135	85.99%	157
Catahoula	517	74.60%	176	25.40%			341	49.21%	693
Claiborne	1,216	96.20%	48	3.80%			1,168	92.41%	1,264
Concordia	380	96.94%	12	3.06%			368	93.88%	392
De Soto	1,219	95.61%	56	4.39%			1,163	91.22%	1,275
East Baton Rouge	2,336	84.09%	442	15.91%			1,894	68.18%	2,778
East Carroll	247	96.86%	8	3.14%			239	93.73%	255
East Feliciana	529	94.63%	30	5.37%			499	89.27%	559
Evangeline	542	48.01%	587	51.99%			-45	-3.99%	1,129
Franklin	898	83.85%	173	16.15%			725	67.69%	1,071
Grant	674	86.08%	109	13.92%			565	72.16%	783
Iberia	438	25.57%	1,275	74.43%			-837	-48.86%	1,713
Iberville	385	45.29%	465	54.71%			-80	-9.41%	850
Jackson	1,229	88.10%	166	11.90%			1,063	76.20%	1,395
Jefferson	1,238	86.57%	192	13.43%			1,046	73.15%	1,430
Jefferson Davis	728	44.86%	895	55.14%			-167	-10.29%	1,623
Lafayette	823	44.06%	1,045	55.94%			-222	-11.88%	1,868
Lafourche	337	24.40%	1,044	75.60%			-707	-51.19%	1,381
La Salle	570	82.13%	109	15.71%	15	2.16%	461	66.43%	694
Lincoln	989	84.39%	183	15.61%			806	68.77%	1,172
Livingston	674	75.48%	218	24.41%	1	0.11%	456	51.06%	893
Madison	331	98.81%	4	1.19%			327	97.61%	335
Morehouse	622	94.24%	38	5.76%			584	88.48%	660
Natchitoches	1,595	88.71%	203	11.29%			1,392	77.42%	1,798
Orleans	32,724	64.74%	17,819	35.26%			14,905	29.49%	50,543
Ouachita	1,481	89.98%	164	9.96%	1	0.06%	1,317	80.01%	1,646
Plaquemines	329	70.15%	124	26.44%	16	3.41%	205	43.71%	469
Pointe Coupee	407	74.00%	143	26.00%			264	48.00%	550
Rapides	2,765	86.11%	445	13.86%	1	0.03%	2,320	72.25%	3,211
Red River	766	80.38%	187	19.62%			579	60.76%	953
Richland	664	93.00%	50	7.00%			614	85.99%	714
Sabine	1,245	91.81%	111	8.19%			1,134	83.63%	1,356
Saint Bernard	358	86.47%	56	13.53%			302	72.95%	414
Saint Charles	183	66.55%	92	33.45%			91	33.09%	275
Saint Helena	366	91.04%	36	8.96%			330	82.09%	402
Saint James	342	39.09%	533	60.91%			-191	-21.83%	875
Saint John the Baptist	239	48.88%	250	51.12%			-11	-2.25%	489
Saint Landry	1,017	51.91%	942	48.09%			75	3.83%	1,959
Saint Martin	319	43.22%	419	56.78%			-100	-13.55%	738
Saint Mary	539	40.62%	788	59.38%			-249	-18.76%	1,327
Saint Tammany	967	77.80%	276	22.20%			691	55.59%	1,243
Tangipahoa	1,501	77.33%	440	22.67%			1,061	54.66%	1,941
Tensas	243	94.19%	15	5.81%			228	88.37%	258
Terrebonne	477	40.08%	713	59.92%			-236	-19.83%	1,190
Union	1,221	92.57%	98	7.43%			1,123	85.14%	1,319
Vermilion	549	27.87%	1,420	72.08%	1	0.05%	-871	-44.21%	1,970
Vernon	1,143	84.79%	205	15.21%			938	69.58%	1,348
Washington	1,094	86.89%	165	13.11%			929	73.79%	1,259
Webster	1,009	90.01%	112	9.99%			897	80.02%	1,121
West Baton Rouge	352	66.79%	175	33.21%			177	33.59%	527
West Carroll	346	73.62%	104	22.13%	20	4.26%	242	51.49%	470
West Feliciana	356	91.28%	34	8.72%			322	82.56%	390
Winn	963	65.20%	291	19.70%	223	15.10%	672	45.50%	1,477
Totals	87,519	69.24%	38,538	30.49%	339	0.27%	48,981	38.75%	126,396

== Analysis ==
In Acadiana, the 1920 election would see a temporary break with “Solid South” voting patterns, as anger at the Wilson Administration's foreign and domestic policies caused the region's voters – much more moderate on racial issues than the rest of Louisiana – to break powerfully from Democratic nominee James M. Cox. Harding carried fourteen of the Acadian parishes, and in the two most sugar-dependent, Assumption and Lafourche, he received over three-quarters of the vote. In the remainder of Louisiana, as racially hardline as anywhere in the South, Democratic voting remained as rock-solid as ever despite nominee James M. Cox suffering a record 26.17 point landslide defeat and carrying only 41 counties outside antebellum slave states and Oklahoma. The revolt in Acadiana, however, was sufficient to drop Louisiana to Cox’ fourth-best state behind Georgia as well as South Carolina and Mississippi (as was typical in the “Solid South” era). As of the 2024 election, this is the last time that a Republican has won a majority in Iberville Parish, as Dwight D. Eisenhower, Richard Nixon, and Donald Trump only received pluralities.

== See also ==
- United States presidential elections in Louisiana
