= Starns, Louisiana =

Unincorporated community in Louisiana

- Unincorporated community
- Location within Louisiana Location within the United States
- Coordinates: 30°33′42″N 90°39′32″W
- Country: United States
- State: Louisiana
- Parish: Livingston
- Elevation: 43 ft (13 m)
- Time zone: UTC-6 (Central (CST))
  - Summer (DST): UTC-5 (CDT)
- ZIP code: 70443
- Area code: 225
- GNIS feature ID: 556139
- FIPS code: 22-72990

Starns also known as Starns Mill is an unincorporated community in Livingston Parish, Louisiana, United States. The community is located 6 miles (9.7 kilometres) northwest of Albany and 4 miles (6.4 kilometres) north of Holden.

== History ==
A post office was established here in April 1882 and the area was named after the first postmaster, Adolphus Starns. Adolphus was a descendant of Edward Bynum Starns, who received the first land grant given in the area by the Spanish Empire. The Morgan family stated in an interview that a man named Sentel Lott would carry the daily mail back and forth between Holden, Louisiana, using a mule and buggy.
