= Supreme, Louisiana =

- Census-designated place
- Location of Supreme in Louisiana
- Coordinates: 29°51′36″N 90°59′07″W
- Country: United States
- State: Louisiana
- Parish: Assumption

Area
  - Total: 3.44 sq mi (8.90 km^{2})
  - Land: 3.39 sq mi (8.77 km^{2})
  - Water: 0.050 sq mi (0.13 km^{2})
- Elevation: 16 ft (4.9 m)

Population (2020)
  - Total: 839
  - Density: 247.8/sq mi (95.69/km^{2})
- Time zone: UTC-6 (CST)
  - Summer (DST): UTC-5 (CDT)
- Area code: 985
- FIPS code: 22-74235

Supreme is a census-designated place (CDP) in Assumption Parish, Louisiana, United States. The population was 1,052 at the 2010 census. In 2020, its population was 839.

== Geography ==
Supreme is located at 29°51′36″N 90°59′7″W (29.859875, -90.985197).

According to the United States Census Bureau, the CDP has a total area of 3.4 square miles (8.9 km^{2}), of which 3.4 square miles (8.8 km^{2}) is land and 0.039 square miles (0.1 km^{2}), or 1.43%, is water.

== Demographics ==
Historical population
Census	Pop.	Note	%±
1990	1,020		—
2000	1,119		9.7%
2010	1,052		−6.0%
2020	839		−20.2%
U.S. Decennial Census; 1950 1960 1970 1980; 1990 2000 2010

Supreme first appeared as a census designated place the 1990 U.S. census.

Supreme CDP, Louisiana – Racial and ethnic composition Note: the US Census treats Hispanic/Latino as an ethnic category. This table excludes Latinos from the racial categories and assigns them to a separate category. Hispanics/Latinos may be of any race.
Race / Ethnicity (NH = Non-Hispanic)	Pop 2000	Pop 2010	Pop 2020	% 2000	% 2010	% 2020
White alone (NH)	159	151	126	14.21%	14.35%	15.02%
Black or African American alone (NH)	935	879	670	83.56%	83.56%	79.86%
Native American or Alaska Native alone (NH)	2	6	1	0.18%	0.57%	0.12%
Asian alone (NH)	0	0	2	0.00%	0.00%	0.24%
Native Hawaiian or Pacific Islander alone (NH)	0	0	0	0.00%	0.00%	0.00%
Other race alone (NH)	0	0	0	0.00%	0.00%	0.00%
Mixed race or Multiracial (NH)	4	1	21	0.36%	0.10%	2.50%
Hispanic or Latino (any race)	19	15	19	1.70%	1.43%	2.26%
Total	1,119	1,052	839	100.00%	100.00%	100.00%
