= Plattenville, Louisiana =

Unincorporated community in Louisiana, US

Coordinates: 29°59′20″N 91°01′19″W

Plattenville
- Unincorporated community
- Location within Louisiana
- Country: United States
- State: Louisiana
- Parish: Assumption

Population (2000)
  - Total: 1,965
- Time zone: UTC-6 (CST)
  - Summer (DST): UTC-5 (CDT)
- ZIP code: 70393
- Area code: 985

Plattenville is an unincorporated community in Assumption Parish, Louisiana, United States. The population was 1,965 at the 2000 census.
