= Montpelier, Louisiana =

- Village
- Village of Montpelier
- Location of Montpelier in St. Helena Parish, Louisiana.

- Location of Louisiana in the United States
- Coordinates: 30°40′56″N 90°39′16″W !-- Area/postal codes and others -->
- Country: United States
- State: Louisiana
- Parish: St. Helena

Area
  - Total: 1.88 sq mi (4.86 km^{2})
  - Land: 1.87 sq mi (4.84 km^{2})
  - Water: 0.0077 sq mi (0.02 km^{2})
- Elevation: 128 ft (39 m)

Population (2020)
  - Total: 196
  - Density: 105.0/sq mi (40.53/km^{2})
- Time zone: UTC-6 (CST)
  - Summer (DST): UTC-5 (CDT)
- Area code: 985
- FIPS code: 22-51690
- GNIS feature ID: 2407504

Montpelier is a village in St. Helena Parish, Louisiana, United States. The population was 197 in 2020. It is part of the Baton Rouge metropolitan statistical area.

Montpelier was the parish seat from 1812-1832.

== Geography ==
According to the United States Census Bureau, the village has a total area of 1.9 square miles (4.8 km^{2}), of which 1.9 square miles (4.8 km^{2}) is land and 0.53% is water.

== Demographics ==
Historical population
Census	Pop.	Note	%±
1960	197		—
1970	211		7.1%
1980	219		3.8%
1990	247		12.8%
2000	214		−13.4%
2010	266		24.3%
2020	196		−26.3%
2025 (est.)	198	▲	1.0%
U.S. Decennial Census

Montpelier village, Louisiana – Racial and ethnic composition Note: the US Census treats Hispanic/Latino as an ethnic category. This table excludes Latinos from the racial categories and assigns them to a separate category. Hispanics/Latinos may be of any race.
Race / Ethnicity (NH = Non-Hispanic)	Pop 2000	Pop 2010	Pop 2020	% 2000	% 2010	% 2020
White alone (NH)	123	118	92	57.48%	44.36%	46.94%
Black or African American alone (NH)	86	140	91	40.19%	52.63%	46.43%
Native American or Alaska Native alone (NH)	0	0	0	0.00%	0.00%	0.00%
Asian alone (NH)	0	1	0	0.00%	0.38%	0.00%
Native Hawaiian or Pacific Islander alone (NH)	0	0	0	0.00%	0.00%	0.00%
Other race alone (NH)	0	4	0	0.00%	1.50%	0.00%
Mixed race or Multiracial (NH)	0	0	4	0.00%	0.00%	2.04%
Hispanic or Latino (any race)	5	3	9	2.34%	1.13%	4.59%
Total	214	266	196	100.00%	100.00%	100.00%

As of the 2020 United States census, there were 197 people, 135 households, and 90 families residing in the village.

== Education ==
Montpelier and all of St. Helena Parish are served by the St. Helena Parish School System. Zoned campuses include St. Helena Central Arts and Technology Academy (Grades 3-6), St. Helena Early Learning Center (Grades PK-2), and St. Helena College and Career Academy (Grades 7-12).
