= Paincourtville, Louisiana =

- Census-designated place
- Location of Paincourtville in Louisiana
- Coordinates: 29°59′28″N 91°03′35″W
- Country: United States
- State: Louisiana
- Parish: Assumption

Area
  - Total: 1.74 sq mi (4.50 km^{2})
  - Land: 1.74 sq mi (4.50 km^{2})
  - Water: 0 sq mi (0.00 km^{2})
- Elevation: 16 ft (4.9 m)

Population (2020)
  - Total: 857
  - Density: 492.8/sq mi (190.27/km^{2})
- Time zone: UTC-6 (CST)
  - Summer (DST): UTC-5 (CDT)
- ZIP code: 70390
- Area code: 985
- FIPS code: 22-58745

Paincourtville is a census-designated place (CDP) in Assumption Parish, Louisiana, United States. As of the 2020 census, Paincourtville had a population of 857.

== History ==
Legend says an early traveler, unable to buy a single loaf of bread there, facetiously called the place "short of bread town", which translates to Paincourtville.

The first permanent settlements in this region were made by the French and Spanish (including Isleños), circa the mid-18th century along Bayou Lafourche, between the present towns of Donaldsonville and Napoleonville. From 1755 to 1764, the population was increased by the immigration of the exiled Acadians who emigrated to the area, clearing the land and building homes. Many of their descendants remain in the parish today.

On a plot donated by Elizabeth Dugas, St. Elizabeth's Church was built in 1840. Parishioners promptly rebuilt their church after a fire in 1854. In 1903 a third structure, still in use, was completed. Nearby on a special steel scaffolding is the church bell, too large for either of the church's two towers. It was brought from France.

== Geography ==
Paincourtville is located at 29°59′28″N 91°3′35″W (29.990994, -91.059639).

According to the United States Census Bureau, the CDP has a total area of 1.7 square miles (4.5 km^{2}), all land.

== Demographics ==
Historical population
| Census | Pop. | Note | %± |
|---|---|---|---|
| 1980 | 2,004 | | — |
| 1990 | 1,550 | | −22.7% |
| 2000 | 884 | | −43.0% |
| 2010 | 911 | | 3.1% |
| 2020 | 857 | | −5.9% |
U.S. Decennial Census; 1950 1960 1970 1980; 1990 2000 2010

Paincourtville first appeared as a census designated place the 1980 U.S. Census. Paincourtville is part of the Pierre Part Micropolitan Statistical Area.

As of the census of 2000, there were 884 people, 317 households, and 245 families residing in the CDP. The population density was 551.1 inhabitants per square mile (212.8/km^{2}). There were 343 housing units at an average density of 213.8 per square mile (82.5/km^{2}). The racial makeup of the CDP was 55.43% White, 43.33% African American, 0.45% Asian, and 0.79% from two or more races. Hispanic or Latino of any race were 1.02% of the population.

There were 317 households, out of which 33.8% had children under the age of 18 living with them, 55.8% were married couples living together, 15.8% had a female householder with no husband present, and 22.7% were non-families. 21.1% of all households were made up of individuals, and 12.3% had someone living alone who was 65 years of age or older. The average household size was 2.79 and the average family size was 3.25.

In the CDP, the population was spread out, with 25.5% under the age of 18, 9.3% from 18 to 24, 27.4% from 25 to 44, 23.1% from 45 to 64, and 14.8% who were 65 years of age or older. The median age was 37 years. For every 100 females, there were 82.6 males. For every 100 females age 18 and over, there were 85.1 males.

The median income for a household in the CDP was $32,014, and the median income for a family was $36,563. Males had a median income of $41,750 versus $22,500 for females. The per capita income for the CDP was $17,500. About 10.5% of families and 15.3% of the population were below the poverty line, including 11.0% of those under age 18 and 14.6% of those age 65 or over.

== Notable people ==
- Paincourtville was the birthplace of former Louisiana State Representatives Samuel A. LeBlanc I LeBlanc represented Assumption Parish from 1912 to 1916 and was thereafter a state court judge.
- William S. Patout III, a large sugar grower in Iberia Parish, resided in Paincourtville in the early 1960s.
- Dan Brouillette, United States Secretary of Energy, appointed by Donald Trump, confirmed by Senate on December 2, 2019.
