= Mitchell Guist =

American hunter and television personality

- Born: Mitchell James Guist; May 18, 1964; Gonzales, Louisiana, US
- Died: May 14, 2012 (aged 47); Belle River, Louisiana, US
- Occupations: Television personality, construction worker
- Years active: 2011–2012

Mitchell James Guist (May 18, 1964 – May 14, 2012), was an alligator hunter and reality television star who starred in the television show Swamp People until his death, in 2012, from natural causes.

== Early life ==
Mitchell Guist was born in 1964 in Gonzales, Louisiana, and lived with his brother, Glenn, for his entire life.

== TV career ==
In 2011, Mitchell and Glenn became stars on the History Channel's reality show, Swamp People. They became instant stars on the History Channel and had a fan club. On Swamp People they would regularly be featured hunting for their dinner which included alligator gar, blue catfish, crayfish, cottontail rabbit, squirrel, bullfrog, alligator snapping turtle, and once by accident an American alligator.

Mitchell and Glenn were both featured in a Swamp People special where they hunted cottontail rabbits, later trading them for snapping turtles.

Mitchell and Glenn were also featured in the 2012 third season of Swamp People.

== Death ==
On May 14, 2012, Mitchell Guist suffered an accident on the Belle River near Pierre Part. According to authorities he slipped and fell while loading items onto his boat. It was initially reported that he suffered a seizure, but it is unclear whether the seizure was a result of the fall or if it was caused by a medical condition. It was later revealed that Guist suffered a heart attack. Guist, aged 47, was pronounced dead at a Morgan City hospital; the coroner for Ascension Parish later determined that his death was due to natural causes. He was buried at Lusk Cemetery in Gonzales, Louisiana. The "Voodoo Bayou" episode of Swamp People, originally aired on May 17, 2012, was dedicated in Guist's memory.
