= List of Swamp People episodes (season 11–present) =

Swamp People is an American reality series that was first broadcast on History on August 22, 2010. The show follows the day-to-day activities of people living in the swamps of the Atchafalaya River Basin who hunt American alligators for a living.

As of February 18, 2026, 282 episodes of Swamp People have aired, currently in the 17th season.

== Series overview ==
Season	Episodes	Originally released	
Season	Episodes	First released	Last released
1	10	August 22, 2010	October 31, 2010
2	17	March 31, 2011	November 17, 2011
3	22	February 9, 2012	July 12, 2012
4	24	February 14, 2013	January 27, 2014
5	23	February 3, 2014	December 8, 2014
6	20	February 2, 2015	July 13, 2015
7	13	February 8, 2016	May 2, 2016
8	17	February 16, 2017	May 18, 2017
9	21	February 1, 2018	June 7, 2018
10	16	January 31, 2019	May 23, 2019
11	14	January 23, 2020	April 16, 2020
12	16	February 4, 2021	May 27, 2021
13	15	January 27, 2022	May 19, 2022
14	16	January 5, 2023	April 27, 2023
15	16	January 4, 2024	April 25, 2024
16	16	January 2, 2025	April 24, 2025
17	14	January 7, 2026	TBA

== Episodes ==
=== Season 11 (2020) ===
No. overall	No. in season	Title	Original release date	U.S. viewers (millions)
184	1	"Raging Bulls"	January 23, 2020	1.35
185	2	"Return to Froggy Bayou"	January 30, 2020	1.43
186	3	"The Champ"	February 6, 2020	1.39
187	4	"Mystery in the Bayou"	February 13, 2020	1.36
188	5	"Bad Mojo"	February 20, 2020	1.32
189	6	"Friday the 13th"	February 27, 2020	1.32
190	7	"Deadeye Driver"	March 5, 2020	1.47
191	8	"Airboat Armada"	March 12, 2020	1.55
192	9	"One Man Army"	March 19, 2020	1.60
193	10	"Casanova Gator"	March 26, 2020	1.71
194	11	"The Cannibal"	April 2, 2020	1.67
195	12	"Swamp on Fire"	April 9, 2020	1.34
196	13	"Graduation Day"	April 16, 2020	1.59
197	14	"Final Showdown"	April 16, 2020	1.40

=== Season 12 (2021) ===
No. overall	No. in season	Title	Original release date	U.S. viewers (millions)
198	1	"Gator Attack"	February 4, 2021	1.24
199	2	"Cajun Queen"	February 4, 2021	1.10
200	3	"Battle of the Baits"	February 11, 2021	1.19
201	4	"The Boneyard"	February 18, 2021	1.33
202	5	"Heat Wave"	February 25, 2021	1.23
203	6	"Swamp Secrets"	March 4, 2021	1.21
204	7	"Darkest Fears"	March 11, 2021	1.30
205	8	"Day of the Deckhand"	March 18, 2021	1.34
206	9	"Horse Eaters"	April 1, 2021	1.52
207	10	"Black Clouds"	April 8, 2021	1.25
208	11	"To The Rescue"	April 15, 2021	1.54
209	12	"Fire Power"	April 22, 2021	1.30
210	13	"Gators on Ice"	May 6, 2021	1.37
211	14	"You Bet Your Gator"	May 13, 2021	1.23
212	15	"Tag Teaming"	May 20, 2021	1.26
213	16	"Bayou Blowout"	May 27, 2021	1.28

=== Season 13 (2022) ===
No. overall	No. in season	Title	Original release date	U.S. viewers (millions)
214	1	"Gators on the Storm"	January 27, 2022	N/A
215	2	"Nothing but Bulls"	February 3, 2022	N/A
216	3	"Battle of the Sexes"	February 10, 2022	N/A
217	4	"Blast in the Bayou"	February 17, 2022	N/A
218	5	"Gators in Low Places"	February 24, 2022	N/A
219	6	"Secret Sauce"	March 3, 2022	N/A
220	7	"Battle of Black Lagoon"	March 10, 2022	N/A
221	8	"Sinkhole Giants"	March 17, 2022	N/A
222	9	"Swamp Professor"	March 31, 2022	N/A
223	10	"Captain Pickle"	April 7, 2022	N/A
224	11	"Crawfish Monster"	April 14, 2022	N/A
225	12	"Full Moon Mayhem"	April 21, 2022	N/A
226	13	"Swamp Juice"	May 5, 2022	N/A
227	14	"Tag Team Gators"	May 12, 2022	N/A
228	15	"Til the Fat Gator Sings"	May 19, 2022	N/A

=== Season 14 (2023) ===
No. overall	No. in season	Title	Original release date	U.S. viewers (millions)
229	1	"Gator War"	January 5, 2023	N/A
230	2	"The Big 10"	January 12, 2023	N/A
231	3	"Pig Head"	January 19, 2023	N/A
232	4	"Swamp of the Giants"	January 26, 2023	N/A
233	5	"Pickle's Secret Weapon"	February 2, 2023	N/A
234	6	"Pirate Cursed Gators"	February 9, 2023	N/A
235	7	"Flying Gators"	February 16, 2023	N/A
236	8	"Gators from the Grave"	February 23, 2023	N/A
237	9	"Hungry, Hungry Gators"	March 2, 2023	N/A
238	10	"Pickle's Holiday"	March 9, 2023	N/A
239	11	"Gator Lightning"	March 23, 2023	N/A
240	12	"Flash Frozen Gators"	March 30, 2023	N/A
241	13	"Zombie Pirate Gators"	April 6, 2023	N/A
242	14	"The Marina Monster"	April 13, 2023	N/A
243	15	"Big Gators or Bust"	April 20, 2023	N/A
244	16	"Who Will Be King?"	April 27, 2023	N/A

=== Season 15 (2024) ===
No. overall	No. in season	Title	Original release date	U.S. viewers (millions)
245	1	"Cruel Summer"	January 4, 2024	N/A
246	2	"Double Trouble"	January 11, 2024	N/A
247	3	"Hot as Hell"	January 18, 2024	N/A
248	4	"Cypress Clash"	January 25, 2024	N/A
249	5	"Come Hell or Low Water"	February 1, 2024	N/A
250	6	"Down to the Wire"	February 8, 2024	N/A
251	7	"Chasing a Legend"	February 15, 2024	N/A
252	8	"Curse of Graveyard Island"	February 22, 2024	N/A
253	9	"Gator Stakes"	February 29, 2024	N/A
254	10	"King for a Day"	March 7, 2024	N/A
255	11	"Full Moon Frenzy"	March 14, 2024	N/A
256	12	"Bayou Bloodlines"	March 21, 2024	N/A
257	13	"Swamp Jaws"	April 4, 2024	N/A
258	14	"Boom or Bust"	April 11, 2024	N/A
259	15	"Ice Cold Gamble"	April 18, 2024	N/A
260	16	"Legacy on the Line"	April 25, 2024	N/A

=== Season 16 (2025) ===
No. overall	No. in season	Title	Original release date	U.S. viewers (millions)
261	1	"Racing the Storm"	January 2, 2025	N/A
262	2	"Snapping Back"	January 9, 2025	N/A
263	3	"Chaos Before the Storm"	January 16, 2025	N/A
264	4	"Hurricane Francine"	January 23, 2025	N/A
265	5	"The Aftermath"	January 30, 2025	N/A
266	6	"Feeding Frenzy"	February 6, 2025	N/A
267	7	"Bayou Broiler"	February 13, 2025	N/A
268	8	"Gators, Guns, and a Wedding"	February 20, 2025	N/A
269	9	"Catch and Cook"	February 27, 2025	N/A
270	10	"New Partners, New Threats"	March 6, 2025	N/A
271	11	"Swamp Showdown"	March 13, 2025	N/A
272	12	"Tree Breakers"	March 20, 2025	N/A
273	13	"Silent Assassins"	April 3, 2025	N/A
274	14	"The Swamp Strikes Back"	April 10, 2025	N/A
275	15	"The Final 48"	April 17, 2025	N/A
276	16	"End of the Line"	April 24, 2025	N/A

=== Season 17 (2026) ===
No. overall	No. in season	Title	Original release date	U.S. viewers (millions)
277	1	"High and Dry"	January 7, 2026	N/A
278	2	"Flash Flood"	January 14, 2026	N/A
279	3	"Smoke on the Bayou"	January 21, 2026	N/A
280	4	"The 17-Gator Gauntlet"	January 28, 2026	N/A
281	5	"Hunt for the Crocogator"	February 4, 2026	N/A
282	6	"Trial by Flood"	February 18, 2026	N/A
283	7	"Heat Advisory"	February 25, 2026	N/A
284	8	"Swamp Vets"	March 4, 2026	N/A
285	9	"No Easy Gator"	March 11, 2026	TBD
286	10	"Put up or Shut up"	March 18, 2026	TBD
287	11	"Monster Season"	March 25, 2026	TBD
288	12	"Rising Tides, Risky Moves"	April 1, 2026	TBD
289	13	"Late Season Salvation"	TBA	TBD
290	14	"Tag Out or Bust"	TBA	TBD
