= Swamp People =

American reality series

- Title card of the show (seasons 1–3). Also used as a commercial intro bumper for seasons 1–5.
- Genre: Reality television
- Developed by: Dolores Gavin
- Narrated by: Pat Duke
- Composers: Don DiNicola; Brian Deming; Bruce Hanifan
- Country of origin: United States
- Original language: English
- No. of seasons: 17
- No. of episodes: 288 (list of episodes)

Production
- Executive producers: Jay Peterson; Thomas Peyton Brian Catalina
- Production location: Atchafalaya Basin, Louisiana
- Cinematography: Alex Rappoport; Walter Mather
- Camera setup: Multi-camera
- Production company: Original Media/Truly Original

Original release
- Network: History
- Release: August 22, 2010 – present

Swamp People is an American reality television series that was first broadcast on History on August 22, 2010. The show follows the day-to-day activities of alligator hunters living in the swamps of the Atchafalaya River Basin who hunt American alligators for a living.

== Format ==
Alligator season in Louisiana begins on the first Wednesday in September and lasts for 30 days. In this time, many of the alligator hunters, following a tradition dating back about 300 years, earn most of their yearly income in a high risk vocation dependent on experience and the whims of weather within strict regulation by wildlife laws. Hunters are each issued a certain number of tags that must be attached to their kills; once they "tag out" (run out of tags), their season is over, and they may no longer kill any more alligators for the rest of the season. During this 30-day window, some of these hunters earn most of their annual income culling alligators; therefore, the ultimate goal for the alligator hunters is to tag out before the season ends. Most of the hunters spend the rest of the year harvesting other species (fish, crawfish, shrimp, crabs, raccoons, turtles, etc.) to augment their yearly incomes and/or holding down full-time jobs in other industries.

Each season, the series focuses on various teams of alligator hunters. Some episodes also feature other aspects of the social and sporting life of the swamp, including fishing and hunting for other animals.

Beginning with the fourth season, the program expanded to venues outside the Atchafalaya River Basin, featuring gator hunting crews in other parts of Louisiana, as well as the swamplands of Texas.

== Cast members ==
^{Sources:}

=== Current ===
Individual	Location(s)	Season(s)
Bruce Mitchell	Hammond, Louisiana	1–9 and 12–present
Jacob Landry	Pierre Part, Louisiana	1–present
Troy Landry	Pierre Part, Louisiana	1–present
Daniel Edgar	Pierre Part, Louisiana	7–present
Joey Edgar	Pierre Part, Louisiana	7–present
Ronnie Adams	Belle River, Louisiana	10–present
Zak Bagby	Pierre Part, Louisiana	10–present
Don Brewer	Pierre Part, Louisiana	11–present
"Little" Willie Edwards	Bayou Sorrel, Louisiana	11–present
Cheyenne "Pickle" Wheat	Pierre Part, Louisiana	12–present
Anthony "Porkchop" Williams	Vacherie, Louisiana	13–present
LeRon Jones	Vacherie, Louisiana	13–present
Anna Ribbeck	Baton Rouge, Louisiana	14-present
Timmy Aucoin	Pierre Part, Louisiana	14-present
Calum Landry	Pierre Part, Louisiana	16–present
Kallie Edgar	Pierre Part, Louisiana	16–present

=== Previous ===
Individual	Location(s)	Season(s)
Albert Knight	Morgan City, Louisiana	1
Anthony Knight	Morgan City, Louisiana	1
Clint Landry	Pierre Part, Louisiana	1 and 3
Joe LaFont	Port Sulphur, Louisiana	1–3 and 6
Junior Edwards (deceased)	Bayou Sorrel, Louisiana	1–6 and 12
Kenwood Knight	Morgan City, Louisiana	1
Malcom McQuiston	Bayou Sorrel, Louisiana	1–3
Mike Kliebert	Hammond, Louisiana	1
Randy Edwards (deceased)	Bayou Sorrel, Louisiana	1 and 3–6
T-Mike Kliebert	Hammond, Louisiana	1
Tommy Chauvin	Port Sulphur, Louisiana; Violet, Louisiana (Seasons 8–9)	1–3, 6, and 8–9
Tyler (dog) (deceased)	Hammond, Louisiana	1–5
William "Willie" Edwards	Bayou Sorrel, Louisiana	1–15
Glenn Guist	Gonzales, Louisiana; Pecan Island, Louisiana (Seasons 4–6)	2–9
Jay Paul Molinere	Houma, Louisiana; Violet, Louisiana (Seasons 8–9)	2–10
Liz Choate	Pierre Part, Louisiana (Season 2); Pecan Island, Louisiana (Seasons 3–6, 12)	2–6 and 12
Mitchell Guist (deceased)	Gonzales, Louisiana	2–3
Nick Payne	Hammond, Louisiana	2
RJ Molinere Jr.	Houma, Louisiana; Violet, Louisiana (Season 8)	2–10
Terral Evans	Slidell, Louisiana (Seasons 2, 5–6); Pierre Part, Louisiana (Seasons 10–11)	2, 5–6, and 10–11
Austyn Yoches	Bayou Pigeon, Louisiana	3
Blake MacDonald	Bayou Pigeon, Louisiana	3
Chase Landry	Pierre Part, Louisiana	3–16
Kristi Broussard	Pecan Island, Louisiana	3–4 and 8–9
Manneaux (dog)	Bayou Pigeon, Louisiana	3
Ron Methvin	Hammond, Louisiana	3–9
Harlan "Bigfoot" Hatcher	Beaumont, Texas; Pierre Part, Louisiana (Season 4)	4–5 and 9
Brandon Hotard	Pierre Part, Louisiana	4–6
David LaDart	Marion, Louisiana; Raceland, Louisiana (Season 5); Violet, Louisiana (Season 5)	4–6
Jeromy Pruitt	Marion, Louisiana; Raceland, Louisiana (Season 5); Violet, Louisiana (Season 5)	4–6
Jessica Choate	Pecan Island, Louisiana	4–6
Marie Lacoste	Pierre Part, Louisiana	4–5
T-Roy Broussard	Beaumont, Texas; Pierre Part, Louisiana (Season 4)	4–5
Tom Candies	Thibodaux, Louisiana	4
ZZ Loupe	Thibodaux, Louisiana	4
Holden Landry	Pierre Part, Louisiana	5–6 and 8–10
Johnny Banks	Slidell, Louisiana	5
Johny Tenner	Zwolle, Louisiana	5
Roger Rivers	Zwolle, Louisiana	5
Dorien Edgar	Pierre Part, Louisiana	7–9 and 12–15
Robert "Frenchy" Crochet	Terrebonne Parish, Louisiana	7–10 and 12
Gerard "Gee" Singleton	Terrebonne Parish, Louisiana	7–10 and 12
Alvin Plaisance	Houma, Louisiana; Violet, Louisiana	8
Dwaine Edgar	Pierre Part, Louisiana	8–10
Justin Roy	Pecan Island, Louisiana	8–9
Todd Alexander (deceased)	Gonzales, Louisiana	8–9
Joseph "Big T" Rogers Richard	Pierre Part, Louisiana	9–11
Coy Farmer	Beaumont, Texas	9
Jay Foster	Beaumont, Texas	9
Ashley Jones	Belle River, Louisiana	10–15
Dusty Crum	Pierre Part, Louisiana	10
Aaron Lee	Houma, Louisiana	11
Brock Theriot	Houma, Louisiana	11
Destin Choate	Pecan Island, Louisiana	12

=== Mitchell Guist's death ===
On May 14, 2012, Mitchell Guist suffered an accident on the Belle River near Pierre Part. According to authorities he slipped and fell while loading items onto his boat. It was initially reported that he suffered a seizure, but it is unclear whether the seizure was a result of the fall or if it was caused by a medical condition. It was later revealed that Guist suffered a heart attack. Guist was pronounced dead at a Morgan City hospital; the coroner for Ascension Parish later determined that his death was due to natural causes. Guist was 47 years old at the time of his death. The Voodoo Bayou episode, originally aired on May 17, 2012, was dedicated in Guist's memory.

== Broadcast history ==
The series premiered on August 22, 2010, and set a ratings record for History. The show was initially broadcast on Sunday nights at 10:00 p.m. ET/PT.

Season Two saw the show move from Sunday to Thursday, again at 10:00 p.m. ET/PT. The season was met with great success and record breaking viewers for the History channel.

For Season Three, Swamp People moved one hour earlier to 9:00 p.m. ET/PT on Thursday nights. The show returned to that night and time for its fourth season, on February 14, 2013, later moving an hour later to 10:00 p.m. ET/PT on May 30, 2013 after Pawn Stars moved to Thursdays at 9:00 p.m. ET.

For Season Five, Swamp People moved to Monday nights at 9:00 p.m. ET / PT and will continue in to do so for the beginning of Season Six.

Season Six premiered on February 2, 2015, and ended on July 13, 2015. After the end of Season Six, a majority of the cast members were let go after a new producer was brought in, and only a few of the original cast members remained. It was also announced that Season Seven would be the final season, which was met with much pushback from the fanbase.

Season Seven premiered on February 8, 2016, with the newest episode set to air on May 2, 2016. It was announced on April 28, 2016, via Jacob Landry's Facebook page that History had ordered an eighth season of the series. This season premiered on February 16, 2017.

Later seasons of Swamp People went back to airing on Thursday nights, usually at 9:00 p.m. ET/PT or 10:00 p.m. ET/PT.

== Episodes ==
Season	Episodes	Originally released	
Season	Episodes	First released	Last released
1	10	August 22, 2010	October 31, 2010
2	17	March 31, 2011	November 17, 2011
3	22	February 9, 2012	July 12, 2012
4	24	February 14, 2013	January 27, 2014
5	23	February 3, 2014	December 8, 2014
6	20	February 2, 2015	July 13, 2015
7	13	February 8, 2016	May 2, 2016
8	17	February 16, 2017	May 18, 2017
9	21	February 1, 2018	June 7, 2018
10	16	January 31, 2019	May 23, 2019
11	14	January 23, 2020	April 16, 2020
12	16	February 4, 2021	May 27, 2021
13	15	January 27, 2022	May 19, 2022
14	16	January 5, 2023	April 27, 2023
15	16	January 4, 2024	April 25, 2024
16	16	January 2, 2025	April 24, 2025
17	14	January 7, 2026	TBA

As of April 1, 2026, 288 episodes of Swamp People have aired, currently in the 17th season.

== Reception ==
The series opener of Swamp People premiered on August 22, 2010. The series premiere garnered 3.1 million total viewers, 2.5 million adults 25–54 and 2.3 million adults 18–49 – driving The History Channel to #1 in cable within the 10-11 p.m. time period in total viewers and Adults 25–54.

Episode 1 of season 2 premiered on March 31, 2011. The second-season premiere drew 3.9 million total viewers, and increased 26% versus the season 1 average (3.1 million). It was the series' most-watched episode ever. Swamp People captured 2.0 million adults age 18–49 and age 25–50 impressions up +25% and +18% from the season 1 average respectively (1.6 million A18-49 and 1.7 million A25-54).

The final episode of season 2 was met with record breaking viewers and ratings. The final episode drew 5.5 million viewers. It drew 2.8 million adults 25-54 and adults 18-49 – scoring the #1 show on cable for the night and the #2 spot in all of television. The season overall averaged 4.1 million viewers for the season, which was up 32% versus season 1.

== Spinoff shows ==
On October 21, 2012, a spinoff of Swamp People, Outback Hunters, debuted on the History Channel. Following the same format as Swamp People, the series focuses on crocodile hunters in the Top End of Australia's Northern Territory. Its first season, consisting of 11 episodes, ended on December 30, 2012.

A second spinoff, Swamp Mysteries With Troy Landry, started airing on the History Channel on June 7, 2018. The spinoff follows Troy Landry collaborating with local experts to capture local problem creatures across the Southern United States. The show consisted of one season with six episodes, the last of which aired on July 12, 2018.

A third spinoff, Swamp People Serpent Invasion started airing on the History Channel on March 9, 2020. It features Troy and Chase Landry and Bruce Mitchell teaming with Florida natives Zak Catchem and Bill Booth to eradicate Burmese pythons from the Everglades, where they are an invasive species.

== Mobile app games ==
Two mobile app games were produced as a tie-in to the show:

- Choot'Em Angry Swamp (also known merely as Angry Swamp), is an arcade-style game featuring Troy Landry, and is available for Apple, Android Google Play and Kindle Amazon.
- The self-titled Swamp People (also known as The Swamp People Game), is a hunting simulation game, and is available for Apple and Android-supported devices.

== Home releases ==
Swamp People Season 1
Set details			DVD Layout
10 episodes; 3-disc DVD set; 1.33:1 aspect ratio; Languages: English			Bonus Features – Additional Footage; DISC 1: Big Head Bites It / Houdini's Last Escape / Troy's Gamble / Cannibal Gator; DISC 2: Forces of Nature / Family Feuds / Swamp Wars / Gator Voodoo; DISC 3: Final Countdown / The Last Battle / Bonus
DVD release dates			Bonus Features – Additional Footage; DISC 1: Big Head Bites It / Houdini's Last Escape / Troy's Gamble / Cannibal Gator; DISC 2: Forces of Nature / Family Feuds / Swamp Wars / Gator Voodoo; DISC 3: Final Countdown / The Last Battle / Bonus
Region 1	Region 2	Region 4	Bonus Features – Additional Footage; DISC 1: Big Head Bites It / Houdini's Last Escape / Troy's Gamble / Cannibal Gator; DISC 2: Forces of Nature / Family Feuds / Swamp Wars / Gator Voodoo; DISC 3: Final Countdown / The Last Battle / Bonus
May 31, 2011	September 19, 2011	—N/a	Bonus Features – Additional Footage; DISC 1: Big Head Bites It / Houdini's Last Escape / Troy's Gamble / Cannibal Gator; DISC 2: Forces of Nature / Family Feuds / Swamp Wars / Gator Voodoo; DISC 3: Final Countdown / The Last Battle / Bonus
