= Cliff Crochet =

American professional fisherman

Cliff Crochet (born August 1, 1983), also known as "The Cajun Baby", is an American professional bass fisherman from Pierre Part, Louisiana. Crochet is a competitor on Bass Angler Sportsman Society's (B.A.S.S.) Bassmaster Elite Series and has $478,078 in B.A.S.S. tournament winnings as of February 13, 2018. Crochet's sponsors include: K2 Coolers, Huk, Skeeter, Yamaha Motor Company, Lowrance Electronics, DUCE Rods, Luck E Strike, Seaguar, Rat-L-Trap, Santone Lures, Plenum, Power-Pole, and Classic Fiberglass. Since 2010, Crochet has competed in four Bassmaster Classic tournaments. Crochet's boat for the 2018 season is a 2018 Skeeter FX 21 with a 250 hp Yamaha SHO outboard engine.

== 2016 Bass Pro Shops Bassmaster Central Open Winner ==
On October 29, 2016, Cliff Crochet finished in first place with a three-day total Largemouth Bass weight 46lbs - 6oz to win the Bass Pro Shops Bassmaster Central Open on the Atchafalaya Basin in Morgan City, Louisiana. Crochet won a total cash and merchandise prize of $52,741 in addition to qualifying for the 2017 Bassmaster Classic.

== Personal life ==
Cliff Crochet is married to Sara Crochet and together, the couple has four children: Ben, Lee, Les, and Jay. At the age of 18, Crochet began serving in the Assumption Parrish police force. He also serves as a volunteer youth football coach in his hometown of Pierre Part.

== Professional Bass Angler - Early Career ==
Crochet joined the Lake Verret Bass Club in 2000, participating in B.A.S.S. Federation Nation events. He became the youngest-ever Louisiana State Champion in 2006. From 2007 to 2009, Cliff competed in the Bassmaster Open series, which qualified him both for the 2010 Bassmaster Classic and the 2010 Bassmaster Elite Series.

== Professional Bass Angler - Career (2010-present) ==
As of February 13, 2018, Crochet has competed in 103 Bassmaster tournaments and has received ten top-10 finishes and twenty three top-30 finishes.
