= SpaceX Starbase, Louisiana =

Planned SpaceX Starship manufacturing and launch complex

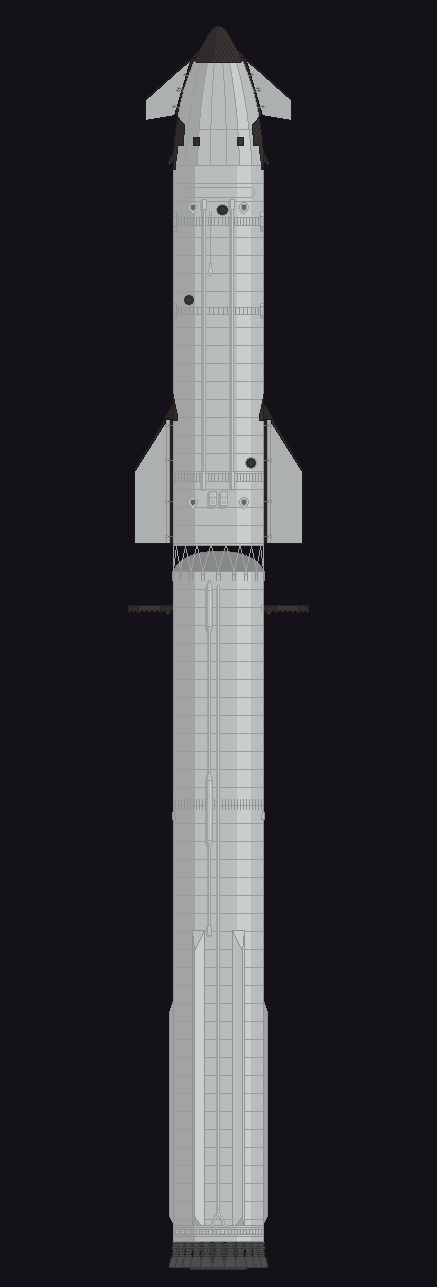
- Starship Version 3, the vehicle planned for launch from the site
- Interactive map of SpaceX Starbase, Louisiana
- Location: Near Pecan Island, Vermilion Parish, Louisiana, United States
- Coordinates: 29.6467°N 92.4531°W
- Time zone: Central
- Operator: SpaceX
- Launch pad(s): 10 planned initially (5 complexes × 2); longer-term goal of 12–20+ towers

Launch history
- Status: Planned
- Associated rockets: Starship (planned)

SpaceX Starbase, Louisiana is a planned large-scale rocket manufacturing, processing, and launch complex for Starship vehicles, located near Pecan Island in Vermilion Parish, Louisiana, along the Gulf of Mexico. Announced on August 25, 2026, by Louisiana Governor Jeff Landry and SpaceX, the project involves a planned investment of up to $100 billion and is intended to become SpaceX’s largest U.S. launch site.

The site covers approximately 125,000 acres of coastal marshland acquired by the state through a settlement of coastal erosion lawsuits against ExxonMobil and subsequently transferred to SpaceX for $100 million. While the total land area would make it the largest spaceport in the world by footprint, launch infrastructure is planned for a relatively small portion near the coastline.

== Facilities and capabilities ==
At full build-out, plans include five launch complexes, each with two pads and an associated propellant farm (10 pads total in the initial configuration). SpaceX founder and CEO Elon Musk has stated longer-term ambitions of “over a dozen” and later “on the order of 20 or more” launch towers to support a cadence of more than 30 Starship flights per day and the transport of millions of tonnes to orbit annually.

Additional planned elements include on-site propellant (methane and oxygen) production, power generation, vehicle processing and manufacturing support, deep-water shipping access via the Intracoastal Waterway and Gulf, employee housing, and the possibility of an airport. SpaceX President and COO Gwynne Shotwell has described the facility as intended to be largely self-sustaining.

== Timeline ==
Construction is expected to begin in 2027, with the publicly stated target for the first Starship launch in 2029. On SpaceX’s October 20, 2026, third-quarter earnings call, Musk described an internal aspiration for a first launch in 2028, while noting that 2029 remains highly likely and that scaled operations from the site in 2029 are the more confident expectation.

Initial work is planned to focus on coastal erosion mitigation and wetland restoration in partnership with state agencies before major launch infrastructure is built.

== Economic impact and incentives ==
Louisiana Economic Development projects 3,000 direct jobs over 10 years at an average annual salary of approximately $92,600, plus roughly 8,100 indirect jobs. SpaceX has begun posting initial job openings for the site.

The project is supported by a large tax-incentive package, including a 25-year payment-in-lieu-of-taxes (PILOT) agreement with the Vermilion Parish Industrial Development Board. The property-tax exemption has been estimated at nearly $24 billion (part of an overall package valued around $27.5 billion when including other incentives). SpaceX is to make an upfront $20 million payment and at least $25 million annually (escalating) to local entities in lieu of property taxes.

In October 2026, a citizens group and residents filed a lawsuit against the Vermilion Parish Police Jury and Industrial Development Board, alleging multiple violations of Louisiana’s open meetings law in the process of approving the PILOT and related land transfers. The suit seeks to void the board’s actions.

== Local and environmental considerations ==
The site is in a sparsely populated coastal area (Pecan Island has roughly 100–300 permanent residents) that is subject to significant wetland loss. SpaceX has stated it will partner on shoreline protection and wetland restoration. Local residents have raised concerns about launch exclusion zones (described by SpaceX as extending several miles), potential restrictions on access to land and the Gulf, noise, and impacts on hunting, fishing, and wildlife. The Louisiana Wildlife Federation has submitted comments to the Federal Aviation Administration (FAA) expressing concerns about coexistence with offshore energy, commercial fishing, aviation, and coastal habitats.

SpaceX has offered Starlink service discounts to residents in parts of Vermilion Parish and is leasing the former Pecan Island School property (via a university-affiliated entity) ahead of a potential purchase.

== See also ==
- SpaceX Starbase (Texas)
- Kennedy Space Center Launch Complex 39A
