= List of Swamp People episodes (season 1–10) =

Swamp People is an American reality series that was first broadcast on History on August 22, 2010. The show follows the day-to-day activities of people living in the swamps of the Atchafalaya River Basin who hunt American alligators for a living.

As of April 1, 2026, 288 episodes of Swamp People have aired, currently in the 17th season.

== Series overview ==
Season	Episodes	Originally released	
Season	Episodes	First released	Last released
1	10	August 22, 2010	October 31, 2010
2	17	March 31, 2011	November 17, 2011
3	22	February 9, 2012	July 12, 2012
4	24	February 14, 2013	January 27, 2014
5	23	February 3, 2014	December 8, 2014
6	20	February 2, 2015	July 13, 2015
7	13	February 8, 2016	May 2, 2016
8	17	February 16, 2017	May 18, 2017
9	21	February 1, 2018	June 7, 2018
10	16	January 31, 2019	May 23, 2019
11	14	January 23, 2020	April 16, 2020
12	16	February 4, 2021	May 27, 2021
13	15	January 27, 2022	May 19, 2022
14	16	January 5, 2023	April 27, 2023
15	16	January 4, 2024	April 25, 2024
16	16	January 2, 2025	April 24, 2025
17	14	January 7, 2026	TBA

== Episodes ==
=== Season 1 (2010) ===
No. overall	No. in season	Title	Original release date	U.S. viewers (millions)
1	1	"Big Head Bites It"	August 22, 2010	4.23
Troy Landry, a proud Cajun from a family with three generations of tradition behind him, is determined to finally capture his own "white whale"—the infamous Big Head, a massive alligator he's pursued for years. This season, the creature has become a serious threat to the bayou's swimming spots, and Troy is more driven than ever to take it down. Meanwhile, veteran hunter Junior Edwards teams up with his eldest son, Willie, crafting their own custom hooks designed specifically for the hunt. In another part of the marsh, Trapper Joe LaFont and his stepson Tommy set out together, but Tommy's reckless behavior soon puts him in dangerous territory.
2	2	"Houdini's Last Escape"	August 29, 2010	2.86
Troy ventures into one of the swamp's most mysterious hunting grounds—the shadowy cypress groves—in pursuit of a legendary gator he calls "Houdini", a cunning beast that has slipped free from his traps time and again. At the same time, Junior finds himself out of his element, reluctantly guiding an unlikely guest through the hunt: a greenhorn Italian leather buyer eager to see the action firsthand.
3	3	"Troy's Gamble"	September 5, 2010	2.79
Troy stumbles upon a promising new honey hole—a stretch of the bayou crawling with gators—but gaining the rights to hunt there comes at a steep price. Elsewhere, Joe and Tommy have their hands full dealing with their own greenhorn, a true landlubber named Bud. Across the swamp, the Kliebard family proves they can rely on skill over technology, as Mike designs and builds a flawless aluminum boat from the ground up, showcasing his Cajun ingenuity and know-how.
4	4	"Cannibal Gator"	September 12, 2010	2.75
Joe and Tommy go head-to-head with a notorious cannibal gator they've dubbed "Godzilla" after finding smaller alligators on their lines marked with vicious bite wounds. Meanwhile, Mike works to pass on his deep swamp knowledge to his son, T-Mike, ensuring the next generation is ready for the challenges ahead. At the same time, Troy faces mounting pressure as his lines keep coming up empty, putting his entire season at risk.
5	5	"Force of Nature"	September 19, 2010	3.21
A powerful cold front is moving in—one that could force the gators into early hibernation and cut the season short. With time running out, every hunter in the swamp scrambles to catch as many gators as possible before the storm shuts everything down.
6	6	"Family Feuds"	September 26, 2010	2.70
Midway through the grueling alligator season, the pressure begins to wear down families across the swamp. Tensions flare between Joe and Tommy as their partnership starts to crack, and even Troy finds himself battling growing frustration. Meanwhile, nuisance gator specialist Howard McCrea sets his sights on a dangerous predator, tracking a deadly alligator that poses a serious threat.
7	7	"Swamp Wars"	October 10, 2010	3.02
As the season races toward its final stretch, Tommy and Joe discover a poacher targeting their catch—and they're determined to deliver a little swamp justice. Meanwhile, Junior and Willie look for creative ways to bring in extra cash, turning to the swamp's other resources by hunting frogs and snakes.
8	8	"Gator Voodoo"	October 17, 2010	2.92
With only a week left in the season, the gators have suddenly stopped biting, leaving hunters puzzled and under pressure. Many suspect the full moon is driving the reptiles into early hibernation, threatening to end their chances for a strong finish. Determined to fight back, the swampers turn to time-tested tactics—venturing into unfamiliar territory and relying on traditional Cajun bait like "shake and bake" to lure the gators out before it's too late.
9	9	"Final Countdown"	October 24, 2010	2.85
With only days remaining in the season, the hunters scramble to fill their tags, racing against the clock to bring in their final catches before time runs out.
10	10	"The Last Battle"	October 31, 2010	3.32
It's the final two days of alligator season, and plenty of gators still remain—including the biggest and most feared cannibal of them all, a monster they've dubbed the "Loch Ness Monster." As the clock winds down, Troy comes face-to-face with his ultimate nemesis, while the other swampers make a last desperate push to close out their season strong.

=== Season 2 (2011) ===
No. overall	No. in season	Title	Original release date	U.S. viewers (millions)
11	1	"Gator Gauntlet"	March 31, 2011	3.85
The gator hunters face a new season that will prove to be more challenging than the last. Troy returns with his son Jacob. Joe and Tommy plan on setting new records, hoping that their "shake and bake" bait seasoning will bring in more gators. Junior and Willie have more tags than ever before, and to accommodate them, they're going to need a bigger boat, but even that has its own set of problems. Also: Terral Evans is introduced - while others hunt gators during the day, he catches gators alive at night as a gator wrangler, risking life and limb with every catch with his bare hands.
12	2	"Hunter or Hunted?"	April 7, 2011	3.53
Only a few days into gator season, Troy and Jacob have over 300 tags remaining. With hopes of picking up the pace, they head toward a new honey hole — an area with evidence of many large gators. R.J. Molinere and his son Jay Paul are introduced to the show; they soon find evidence of a destructive gator named "Dozer"...an alligator known to rip up the banks like a bulldozer. Also: Joe and Tommy continue their blistering pace as they set out to hunt...but when they have a large gator on the line, Tommy's mistakes cost them big time.
13	3	"Shooting Wild"	April 14, 2011	3.78
Troy and Jacob struggle without their old sharpshooter Clint, frustrating the boys. R.J. and J. Paul continue to blaze a trail, threatening to steal Troy's crown as "King of the Swamp". R.J. decides to move the hunt three hours away to an old honey hole. To get there—across rough terrain in remote corners of the swamp—they'll use a secret weapon: an airboat. Meanwhile, veteran solo hunter Bruce Mitchell starts his own season, and he loves to hunt alone, not counting his trusty dog, Tyler. Also: Junior and his crew are speeding along the bayou faster than ever, but they will soon realise that more speed means more danger.
14	4	"First Mates"	April 21, 2011	3.75
To get back on track after the departure of their sharpshooter, Clint, Troy enlists the help of a lady gator hunter who's good with a gun, Liz Cavalier. Also: Bruce began the season solidly, racking up the gators and filling tags; but then, his dog Tyler suddenly goes missing. Meanwhile, Joe gets increasingly frustrated when Tommy's behavior disrupts their momentum. Now, a monster gator is popping their lines, and the boys are determined to get him. As the sun sets, Terral and Trapper Agent Corey Hunt are on the trail of a large gator that's been menacing the locals.
15	5	"Hot Pursuit"	April 28, 2011	3.86
Troy is benefitting from his new partner, Liz - on her first day, Liz showed her skills, but Troy's goal is to catch 25 gators, and there are still a lot of gators to catch. Also: R.J. and J. Paul captured an impressive gator count so far but it all changes when R.J.'s lines are the target of a poacher. Junior decides to send Willie out on his own, as captain of his own boat, hoping that a tag team tactic would net more gators; however, pleasing Junior won't be as easy as it sounds. Meanwhile, Brothers Glenn and Mitchell Guist, born and raised on the bayou, are hunting and fishing, with a unique way of getting business done.
16	6	"Dark Waters"	May 5, 2011	3.71
After a rough start to the season, Troy is back in the groove, and on pace to fill his 320 tags, thanks to Liz; but during a capture, Liz is injured, putting Troy's momentum in doubt. Also: loner Bruce hires a greenhorn named Nick, a local kid who wants learn the craft from a master, to join him on a hunting expedition, but when the kid makes a mistake that could cost Bruce his season, Bruce wishes he was still alone. Meanwhile, Joe and Tommy come up against a massive, aggressive cannibal gator. Then: when the Guist Brothers' food supply is low, they decide to hunt rabbit, using only Glenn's intuition to find the game.
17	7	"Deadly Skies"	May 12, 2011	4.08
As a severe storm nears Southern Louisiana, the hunters prepare for the worst. With his sharpshooter Liz still recovering from an injury, Troy and Jacob employ an old Cajun strategy, a special bait to lure the gators despite the storm. Joe becomes incensed when Tommy chose to take a day off, while Joe believes that every day during gator season is a work day, as long as there are tags that need to be filled. But with a storm brewing, Joe is determined to run their lines in any weather, and drags Tommy along with him. Meanwhile, Jay Paul dreamed about catching a large gator in the storm, a dream that may soon become reality. But while the rest of the swampers head to their lines, Junior and Willie are taking theirs down, believing that fighting the storm is not worth the money or effort as long as they're on pace to tag out.
18	8	"Rising Sons"	May 19, 2011	3.98
Liz, who was on the mend following her injury, returns to Troy's boat. As they both set out on the hunt together, they got a tip from an older Creole gentleman that a monster gator, nicknamed "T-Rex", has killed a dog and is threatening locals. To catch him, Troy and Liz must board their own pirogue, a rickety wooden contraption ill-prepared to handle a large gator. Meanwhile, after a ton of rookie mistakes on Nick's first day, Bruce puts Nick to the test and challenges Nick to show him what he's learned. Also: Willie is captaining his own boat, but when Willie reaches his first line he realizes he's brought along the oldest shotgun in the arsenal. Willie must find a way to bag gators and fill his tags before Junior ends his days as captain. Later that night, Terral has the day off and sets out to catch catfish by noodling — jumping into the swamp and grabbing the fish with his bare hands.
19	9	"Full Moon Fever"	May 26, 2011	3.84
Joe and Tommy are out at work at night, scouting for a new honey hole, but while they're looking for gators, they find another valuable side-benefit - shrimp; they head off hoping to bag a boatload before sunrise. Also that night, Terral, his wife Dana and their friends search for the fabled monster of the Honey Island Swamp. R.J. and Jay Paul search for a poacher who is stealing their gators, but their night plan to find the thieves comes to a standstill when the engine dies and the duo waits for rescue in the dark. Then: Willie goes nighttime snake hunting to make extra money at night while hunting for gators by day. Meanwhile, frogging under the full moon is a Landry family tradition: Troy, Jacob and Troy's dad Mr. Duffy head out in search of tomorrow's dinner. Later that night, the Guist Brothers, who know the swamps as well as anyone, find themselves getting turned around in the dark.
20	10	"It's Personal"	June 9, 2011	4.47
Liz offers some of her own hunting ideas to Troy; Willie heads out to hunt solo; R.J. and Jay Paul's lines come under attack by a vicious cannibal gator; a large hog encroaches on Terral's property.
21	11	"Beat The Clock"	June 16, 2011	4.57
Tommy screws up again and oversleeps, forcing Joe to hunt by himself. Troy still has over 100 tags to fill and tries to use all hours of the day to fill them. Bruce and Nick are after a notorious gator, nicknamed "Lucifer", who dwells in an area known in Cajun lore as The Devil's Swamp. But the hunt becomes personal when Bruce's faithful dog, Tyler, falls overboard, leading Bruce to catch him before the gator does.
22	12	"Rising Pressure"	June 23, 2011	4.56
With only eight days left in the season, the old hot spots are completely fished out. To stay in the game, hunters venture into new grounds. Troy moves his lines every 3 to 4 days to a new area of the swamp. Junior and Willie are headed to a new pond that is teeming with big gators, but the waters in this canal are too shallow, leading Junior to take a risk with his boat and his engine. Meanwhile, tensions between Joe and Tommy escalate when Tommy didn't show up for work yesterday, even more so when they run their lines and find that they are all empty; Joe believes that had Tommy been at work, they would have already run these lines and moved to more populated waters. Then: Glenn and Mitchell are in the mood for squirrel for supper, so they head into the swamp to hunt squirrels.
23	13	"House Divided"	June 30, 2011	4.50
After more than twenty years working together, Joe and Tommy have decided to part ways, and split the remaining tags amongst themselves. To fill Tommy's shoes, Joe hires an up and coming hunter named Timmy. Meanwhile, Tommy decides to hire his old friend Steve. While Joe and Timmy continue business as usual like it was a business, the mood is a lot looser for Tommy and Steve, until they find out that gator hunting is serious business that needs to be treated seriously. And with only days left in the season, both teams need to succeed in order to tag out on time. Also: after spending most of the season fishing apart to fill their tags, Junior and Willie are reunited on the same boat, for good reason: Willie spotted a monster gator on the bayou, nicknamed "Moby", which could be the biggest gator anyone has bagged this season. Then: when R.J. and Jay Paul head to a favorite honey hole, they discover they're not alone - duck season has begun, and this area is the duck hunters' own honey hole.
24	14	"Two Captains, One Family"	July 7, 2011	4.36
After starting the season with more tags than anyone, Troy's ahead of the game, and on pace to tag out by season's end, but the landscape at his favorite honey hole has changed drastically and water lilies are now clogging the entire area, leading to Troy to find an alternate plan. Across the bayou, Joe's hunting with his new helper, a pistol marksman named Timmy, and so far, the team is working well. Then: Tommy is again captaining his own boat, trying to fill Joe's tags and prove he's an elite hunter. But soon, engine troubles threaten to derail the day and Tommy's tenure as captain could be in jeopardy. Meanwhile: Glenn and Mitchell are again squirrel-hunting, to get the meat needed for their dad's Famous Squirrel and Dumplings.
25	15	"2 Days To Tag Out"	July 14, 2011	3.91
In the race to the finish, Troy is on pace to tag out early, until engine problems suddenly stall the hunt, forcing Troy to return to the dock for repairs. Also: as Junior and Willie head to new hunting grounds, they're hopeful momentum will continue to be on their side, but when it is time to bag a beast, Junior realizes he's forgotten the guns. Meanwhile: Bruce and Nick are down to a handful of tags with the finish line in sight, but suffered a setback when they find that a gator on one of the lines they pulled up was mutilated by a cannibal. Then: R.J. and Jay Paul have an ambitious plan to finish on time: using two boats, fishing 150 lines over more territory, but to tag out by season's end, they'll need to catch a boatload in a hurry. Meanwhile: Joe and Tommy bury the hatchet, reuniting for the final push of the season, with Tommy having a better grasp of the situation.
26	16	"Swamp Showdown"	July 21, 2011	5.52
It is the final day of the season, and hunters are in a hurry to fill their remaining tags before time runs out. As Troy and Junior head to run lines for the final time, the bayou is buzzing of sightings of a giant gator in the area; both men set their sights on the beast, to win bragging rights in a bayou showdown. Also: Joe and Tommy are feeling a different kind of pressure, when rain soaks their supply of bullets, and they're too far out in the bayou to head back to the dock for more, forcing themselves to make every shot count with no margin for error. Then: R.J. and Jay Paul are on pace to tag out to finish by day's end, with sunny skies and smooth water ahead.
27	17	"Swampsgiving"	November 17, 2011	1.45
During the off-season, life goes on for the gator hunters, as they prepare for the Thanksgiving holiday in the swamp. But their idea of a Thanksgiving feast is not strictly turkey and cranberries. Troy and Jacob hunt for wild turkey, venturing into gator-infested waters to bag their catch. Glenn and Mitchell go hunting for squirrel, only to change plans when they catch a rabbit instead; they then trade their catch for a couple of snapping turtles that a neighbor caught. R.J. and Jay Paul hunt wild pigs. And Bruce hunts for gar, using mullet as bait, but when he notices that catfish was taking the bait, Bruce changes the bait, using their freshly-caught catfish as the bait; later, they stay up late to catch frogs.

=== Season 3 (2012) ===
No. overall	No. in season	Title	Original release date	U.S. viewers (millions)
28	1	"Gator Gold Rush"	February 9, 2012	4.78
It is the first day in the 2011 gator season, and there's word that there are more gators available for the hunting, with the makings of a very lucrative season. Hunters forge their plans to not only make every minute count, but also make every gator count. Some will be using their same tricks and people that brought them success last season, while others split off on their own, in hopes that they'll get their own piece of the action. Liz, after working the previous season with Troy, splits off to work on her own, in Pecan Island, in hopes that she'll keep her late father's gator-hunting legacy alive. Meanwhile, Troy is reunited with Clint, who takes Liz's place, as they hunt a gator, "The Godfather", who literally rivals Troy as "King of the Swamp". Also, R.J. and Jay Paul take on their biggest season yet, with 500 tags to be filled in 30 days. Then: Bruce starts his hunting season with a secret weapon -- Ron, a sniper who was a veteran in the War in Iraq.
29	2	"No Guts, No Gator"	February 16, 2012	4.36
Junior and Willie hunt down a nuisance gator they call "Leo the Lion", known for its roar, but it proves that no line can snare this gator, and is reluctant to go down without a fight. Troy and Clint visit a honey hole where they haven't fished for gator in years, except that since then, a levee was built between them and the honey hole. Liz and her assistant, Kristi, are on land to respond to a call that a nuisance gator is invading a fishing camp, and, working outside the safety of their boat, they risk their lives in catching it. R.J. and Jay Paul have trouble with outsiders fishing close to their territory, but when he finds that one of them cut one of his lines to steal a gator, he declares war.
30	3	"Divide to Conquer"	February 23, 2012	4.37
Joe and Tommy plan on catching 30 gators in one day; however, Joe's back injury may not only put that goal in jeopardy, it may also put the whole season in jeopardy as well. Troy and Junior, as a way to expand their operations, have their sons share their own boats, with both teams having the same goal: catch the biggest gator they can find -- Troy's other sons, Jacob and Chase, find a huge gator, but in order to catch it, it must trick it into believing that they're going away; while Willie and Randy get a surprise that catches them off-guard when Randy gets struck in the crotch by a fish. Then: Austyn and Blake are long-time residents of the swamp, but rookies in the gator-hunting season -- a local buyer gives them five tags to fill, and in order to get more, they must fill them all in one day; however, they find out that filling them is easier said than done.
31	4	"Monster Marsh"	March 1, 2012	4.58
For the first time in his career, Tommy hunts gators alone. Joe is resting while his injured back mends. Tommy's propeller strikes something underwater, possibly a pipeline, and is bent by the impact. Bruce and Ron go to Stinky Bayou (so named because of the methane gas that its rotting algae produces). They find the bog too thick for the boat to pass. Bruce's dog, Tyler, jumps out of the boat, with a large gator in the water nearby. Liz and Kristi go to Monster Marsh, where Liz had a close brush with death 10 years ago. Then they catch a 10-foot gator, one of whose legs has been apparently chewed off by another alligator. A buyer gives Austyn and Blake one tag, to be used on a large nuisance gator on the property of a man the buyer knows. The gator is in a landlocked pond, which the boys access using a pirogue.
32	5	"Avenged"	March 8, 2012	5.00
Troy is on a lookout for a gator who was known to have eaten rabbits in his backyard; he and his boys go on the hunt for the gator, vowing to catch him before his loved ones get hurt. R.J. and Jay Paul are on the hunt for "Bigfoot", a large gator that has been at large for the last 35 years, when he mauled one of their tribal elders. Liz and Kristi observe a gator eating bait off one of their lines; when he escaped, Liz made it her priority to catch him before he gets way again. And: when Glenn & Mitchell Guist needed new wood for their porch, they do it the Cajun way -- they "fish" old cypress logs out of the water.
33	6	"Treebreaker 2"	March 15, 2012	5.23
Jacob and Chase look for a gator they call the "Son of Treebreaker", after another tree-breaking gator was spotted in the same area as a similar gator they caught last season, but it seems that the gator has eluded all of their attempts to catch him. R. J. and Jay Paul go to a "hive", an area of floating marsh, as a way to up their gator count for the day and to help R. J. take the "King of the Swamp" crown; however, to him, while every gator counts, size still matters. Willie and Randy go hunting on their own, but their father, Junior, takes away their treble hook, saying that using poles and bait are more effective. In defiance, the boys decided to make a new hook of their own, as a way to prove their father wrong; however, they wonder if doing so was actually worth the trouble. Then: Glenn & Mitchell go fishing for alligator gar, but they ended up catching an actual alligator, which they're not authorized to catch.
34	7	"Something Wicked This Way Comes"	March 29, 2012	4.33
As Tropical Storm Lee approaches the Louisiana coast, the hunters prepare for the worst, while trying to catch as much gators as they can before the storm makes landfall and conditions become too dangerous to hunt. The Landrys continue their two-boat method of hunting gators; however, while Jacob and Chase completed their hunt and made it back safely, Troy and Clint find themselves seeking shelter at an old fisherman's camp, as it become too dangerous to even return home. Liz and Kristi also continue the hunt as well, but they suffer a setback when the sights on Liz's rifle were off, leading to Liz using her backup weapon - a magnum hand gun. Austyn and Blake have five tags to fill for their buyer, but not only they need to have them filled before the storm, they also have to move their houseboat to safety. And Joe, who's recovering from his back injury, rejoins Tommy on the gator hunt, hoping to take advantage of the time before landfall to increase their gator count, but as they are closer to the Gulf and the storm's center than the other hunters, they find themselves battling the elements with full force.
35	8	"Rising Waters"	April 5, 2012	4.51
As Tropical Storm Lee gets closer to the Louisiana coast, the hunters rush to complete their hunt and get home safely before the storm arrives; not only do they fear for the safety of themselves and their loved ones, they also fear for an early end to gator season, due to the colder waters storms bring. Troy and Clint race across Lake Verret in hopes of catching more gators on the other side, but the high winds, waves and rain may sink their boat and leave them stranded in the middle of the lake. Jacob continues the hunt as well, but finds himself short-handed without Chase, who was recovering at home after getting a hook stuck in his foot. Bruce and Ron explore uncharted territory when high waters flood the surrounding land, but when they caught a yellow gator, they also caught a bad superstition, as they found themselves dodging sunken trunks, a tornado and venomous insects, on top of getting lost. Austyn and Blake continue the gator hunt for their buyer, and finds a gator that meets his expectations -- however, in order to shoot it, they must step on a huge fire ant hill. And Joe and Tommy race to run their lines before the storm comes in, but the longer they stay out, the less chance they'll make it back alive -- and when they do, they still had to get their place and their families ready for the storm.
36	9	"Rebound"	April 12, 2012	4.96
After Tropical Storm Lee passed through Louisiana, the hunters try to pick up where they left off. The storm surge has caused several levees to be breached in Myrtle Grove, leading to Joe to prepare for potential flooding, while Tommy rustles up a herd of cattle to be moved to higher ground. The gators have also moved to other areas, due to salt water intrusion, leading to R.J. and Jay Paul to find where they are located, each in their own airboat; but while this tactic increases their chances for a big gator count, only one of them has the gun; also, Jay Paul finds a fawn, whose mother perished in the storm. Liz and Kristi inspect their houseboat to make sure it survived the storm, then went back to business, hunting a large gator that they named "Mr. Lee", after the storm, but after Mr. Lee evaded all efforts to be caught, Liz baits the lines with a secret weapon -- nutria. Junior and his other assistant, Malcom, fish in an area known as "Lizard Lane", which is teeming with gators; however, their time in Lizard Lane is limited, as once the flood waters recede, they may find themselves stranded in the mud. And Glenn & Mitchell go fishing for crayfish, to replenish their food supply which they had consumed during the storm.
37	10	"Gates of Hell"	April 19, 2012	4.46
Halfway into the gator hunting season, the hunters work hard to catch up to make up for time lost to Tropical Storm Lee. Troy and Clint hunt for gator in the Intracoastal Waterway, but when finding unfavorable conditions there, they go to a lily-choked area called the "Gates of Hell", which live up to its name after getting stuck in the lilies and risking burning out their motor. Joe and Tommy find a honey hole in the midst of the higher waters, but when they caught a large gator the thrashing gator strikes Joe's arm, almost breaking it. R.J. celebrates his 50th birthday, and in celebration, he vows to catch 50 gators. Junior rethinks his strategy of using two boats to catch gators when he determines that the two-boat technique is costing him more money; as a result, he informs Willy and Randy that they'll lose their boat if they can't catch at least six gators that day, the least amount needed to make the two-boat technique economically-viable.
38	11	"Under Siege"	April 26, 2012	4.01
R.J. and Jay Paul go to Delta Farms, an underwater ghost town that was flooded out by a levee break in 1972; here, they hunt down "Pas Tout Là" ("Not All There"), a large gator that was not only menacing other wildlife, but other gators as well. Troy and Clint are on the hunt for "King Tut", a gator that had been eluding their capture for the last ten years. Liz and Kristi try to capture "Tête Dure" ("Hard Head"), a gator that not only eluded their capture, but was also practically bulletproof. And Glenn & Mitchell was hired by a friend of theirs, Blake (not to be confused with Austyn's cousin of the same name), to move his houseboat to a new location, in exchange for some smoked gar fish for them.
39	12	"Secret Weapons"	May 3, 2012	4.22
With the hunters entering the second half of the gator-hunting season, they implement their own special techniques that would help them increase their gator count. Jacob and Chase have their grandpa, Troy's father Duffy, along for the ride as they explore a new honey hole -- a spot that Duffy had fished 50 years ago. Austyn and Blake find their regular honey hole blocked by the Army Corps of Engineers for levee repair work, forcing them to find a new spot; while they found success there, they found themselves with too much to handle when a line snagged two gators. Bruce and Ron hunt for the largest gator they can find using their own secret weapon -- chicken infused with extra blood. Junior and Malcom hunt for gator on the opposite side of a dike, requiring them to use a pirogue, but when the gators they hunt were too heavy for the pirogue, they had a solution -- tow them back while the dead gators wear lifejackets.
40	13	"Scorched"	May 10, 2012	3.84
It is the hottest day of the year, and one bound to break records. But the high heat helps stir the gators into a frenzy, giving the hunters a potential for a bumper crop. However, the high heat also not only affects the health of the hunters, it also affects the dead gators, and time is of the essence in order to prevent the dead gators from being spoiled, making the catch worthless. Troy and Clint hunt for gators in Lake Verret, but as temperatures increase, they rush to get their early catch on ice at the buyers before continuing their hunt. Junior and Malcom treat the heat as a good luck charm, as Junior experienced success in the heat previously, but when they have nothing to cool down the dead gators, they try a method that they thought was risky: submerging the carcasses in water along the shore while they continue hunting. Liz and Kristi go to Bayou Black, where Liz first hunted when she was younger, but not only were they ill-equipped to keep the dead gators cool, they ran out of gas, stranding them in the marsh at the hottest time of the day. Bruce and Ron visit the Cypress Graveyard, a part of the swamp littered with dead cypress trees and hunting blinds for deer season, but not only do they risk the heat, but they also risk getting lost in a "maze" of bayous.
41	14	"Voodoo Bayou"	May 17, 2012	4.10
(This episode was dedicated to Mitchell Guist, who died on May 14, 2012). The tides are running abnormally high, and the gator hunters use it to their advantage to hunt gators in waters that were otherwise inaccessible, where the potential of catching large gators are great. Austyn and Blake hunt for gators in Dead End Bayou, an area known for large gators, with a possibility of catching their largest gator ever. Troy and Chase hunt in Duck Lake Bayou, waters where past generations of the Landry family hunted for gator; it is here that Troy hopes that Chase catches his largest gator. R.J. and Jay Paul hunt in the Houma tribe's sacred grounds that was flooded over, where only the natives are allowed to hunt. In keeping with tradition, they hunt for gator using a "smart stick" - a stick with a string on it that gets snagged in the gator's stomach after it takes the bait; R.J. and Jay Paul find that the "smart stick" lives up to its name. Joe and Tommy hunt in Voodoo Bayou, an area known to be cursed, as it is littered with submerged debris and abandoned boats; they fear that they were caught up in the superstition when their engine stalls, and later, when a gator stares them down.
42	15	"Turf War"	May 24, 2012	3.82
After three weeks, the gator season enters the home stretch. And while there are still gators to be caught, the hunters have other tasks that need to be done -- tasks that they normally do outside of gator season. And in some cases, their two jobs are about to collide. Today is the first day of shrimping season, and Joe and Tommy are intent on doing double duty that day: gator hunting in the morning and shrimping in the afternoon. Then: Liz and Kristi are also on a mission to protect Kristi's livelihood -- when Kristi isn't hunting gator, she's wrangling cattle at her family's ranch. Liz and Kristi hunt a nuisance gator that was threatening her grandfather's cattle. Also: Junior's right-hand man Malcom earns most of his annual income hoop-netting for catfish; however, high water has moved a new gator population into Malcom's catfish hot spot. To rid the fishing grounds of the menace, they enlist Willy and Randy's help. Later at night, Junior would do catfishing on his own, while Willy and Randy catch frogs. And: Glenn and Mitchell's friend stopped by with an old boat motor in serious need of fixing, but when they couldn't find the part they need, they find out that a friend of theirs has it, provided that they can get by the language barrier.
43	16	"Big Gators, Big Dollars"	May 31, 2012	4.85
With one week to go in the gator season, it is more important than ever to catch as many gators as they can. And with the demand on gator hides on the upswing, the bigger the gator, the more money they can get. Troy and Clint go to a honey hole where, five years earlier, Troy caught 80 gators in a single day, but present conditions made entering and leaving the bayou difficult. Willy and Randy follow a huge gator that had all but eluded their capture. R.J. and Jay Paul hunt down "Gourmand", a huge rogue gator known to eat anything and everything, but not only were all efforts to catch the gator seem futile, it also consumed their entire bait supply for the day, leading to R.J. using a suitable substitute -- his chicken sandwich. And Austyn and Blake go hunting for gators for Troy's buyer, but the gator they were after has popped several of their lines. At the end of the day when they cash in, they get some pointers on gator hunting from Troy himself.
44	17	"Never Say Die"	June 7, 2012	3.89
With less than a week remaining, the gator hunters go full speed ahead to hunt as much gator as they can. But their efforts become even more challenging when their honey holes get fished out and when they start feeling weary and sore after many days of continuous hunting. Jacob and Chase hunt in a honey hole they call "The Armpit"; while at first they thought it was going to be a lucky day (as they found a horseshoe with one of the hunted gators), their luck suddenly runs out when their baited lines gone untouched and, at one point, they stumbled onto a hornet's nest. To turn their luck around, they used the remnants of their relatives' past hunts, figuring that the hunters of the past may know where the gators are. Liz and Kristi also continue the gator hunt, but with Liz's hands in pain and her body aching from handling the rope all season, she depends on Kristi more than ever to catch the gators, even if it means Kristi risking her life in doing so. Joe and Tommy visit a honey hole thought to be teeming with gators, but found out that a bull gator that they named "Big Jake" has driven all the gators away, and all their usual efforts in reining him in, including "shake and bake", don't work, leading them to resort to a special bait that Big Jake can't refuse -- shad. Junior's regular assistant, Malcom, sustained a foot injury while fishing for catfish, leading him to hire his cousin, Gerald, to take Malcom's place, but the day was thought to be all for nought when Gerald inadvertently scared away a large gator.
45	18	"Cold-Blooded"	June 14, 2012	3.86
With five days remaining in the season, a cold front approaches the area, which could drive gators into hibernation and end the season early, forcing the hunters to step up their game to ensure that they can tag out in time. Jacob and Chase use the same tactic that their father Troy used last season to attract fleeing gators -- rotten beef melt; later, they visit a canal that has seen little boat traffic, as they determine that the gators are on their way to hide there. R.J. and Jay Paul use an airboat to hunt gators, but doing so comes with dangerous risks, as there is nothing in that part of the swamp that can shelter them from the high winds, so they later switch venues -- and switch boats. Junior and Willie are together again as a team, but when no one was taking the bait, they follow the gators to their hiding spots, in hopes that the gators are willing to bite. And Bruce and Ron's season face an early end when not only the cold front endangers their hunt, but also flooding waters from nearby Lake Pontchartrain is threatening their hunting grounds, creating brackish water that drives away the gators.
46	19	"King of the Swamp"	June 21, 2012	4.07
With four days remaining in the season, the hunters do all they can to insure that they will tag out by the end of the season, hoping that they would take the title of "King of the Swamp". But in some cases, personal matters ended up tossing a wrench into the works. Troy and Clint put their own hunt on hold when they help a friend, Rebel, finish his hunt after his partner, Julius, died. But it becomes a challenge when not only they find themselves hunting in marshland (an area unfamiliar to Troy), but also because the gators refuse to take the bait, leading to Troy to question if it was worth putting his own hunt on hold. R.J. and Jay Paul continue their hunt with full speed ahead, with only 71 out of 500 tags to go. Willie and Randy hunt for the last time this season as a team, as Randy's other profession -- fishing for buffalo fish -- is starting to gear up. And Bruce and Ron are not only enduring another fruitless day in the swamp, putting their season in doubt, Bruce's trusty dog Tyler is again getting sick, stemming from congestive heart failure that he suffered earlier, putting extra stress on Bruce.
47	20	"Man Down"	June 28, 2012	3.97
Three days remain in this gator hunting season, and the hunters are working hard under pressure to tag out in time. Troy and Clint, who have 45 tags of their own remaining, continue to work to help Rebel tag out himself, but it proves to be a challenge when the gators just steal their bait and leave, leading Rebel to create a solution to keep the gators where they are when they take the bait. R.J. and Jay Paul continue to work hard to tag out in their 500-tag season, but the hard work is taking a toll on R.J. mentally and physically, leading to Jay Paul to help his dad accomplish his goal. Joe and Tommy hunt a large gator they call "Fat Cat", but the gator eludes all efforts to be caught. leading to Joe using the "shake and bake" method. And Glenn and Mitchell fish for gar and gives some of their smoked catch to their sister, Tonya -- on the condition that she cooks them some turtle sauce piquant, using the turtles that they caught. But it is a task that becomes impossible when Tonya finds out that the turtles were snapping turtles.
48	21	"Fight to the Finish"	July 5, 2012	4.30
(Originally titled "Stick and Move") With two days remaining in gator season, the hunters do all they can to tag out by tomorrow. For some, it is a piece of cake; for others, it means working hard overtime. Joe and Tommy hunt a new spot that Tommy thinks is teeming with gators, gambling precious time in the process, because there's a chance that Tommy's hunch may be incorrect. R.J. and Jay Paul continue on their gargantuous trek to tag out in time, using a technique they call "stick and move" to speed up the process. Junior and Willie reunite to hunt on what they hope is their final day of the season by tagging out a day early, with one of their goals being to hunt down "Big Bertha", a 12-foot gator that has eluded Junior many times before. Liz and Kristi revisit Liz's father's old honey hole that they visited in the season's first episode, with hope that luck and her father's spirit are on their side. And Troy and Clint resume their own hunt, still facing 45 tags in two days, and Troy aims for 30 gators today. To accomplish this, they go to a remote bayou, in hopes that it has an abundance of gators.
49	22	"Endgame"	July 12, 2012	5.19
Today is the last day of the season, and the hunters do all they can to tag out before sundown -- any tags remaining not only mean money lost, but also pride lost. Troy and Clint, with 18 out of 470 tags remaining, and R.J. and Jay Paul, with 11 out of 500 tags remaining, fight to the finish for the "King of the Swamp" title, not only racing to tag out in time, but also to find the biggest gator they could find. Liz and Kristi, with seven tags out of 260 remaining, return to their prized honey hole, but a fish kill is causing the gators to take the fish instead of the bait, leading them to fish elsewhere, but when their spots got fished out with one tag remaining, they resort to hunting for that last gator in open water. And: Bruce and Ron, with 45 tags remaining, face longshot odds to tag out, leading them to make every minute count when hunting gators, but they will find out that giving all they got is not good enough.

=== Season 4 (2013–14) ===
No. overall	No. in season	Title	Original release date	U.S. viewers (millions)
50	1	"Swamp Invaders"	February 14, 2013	4.42
The 2012 alligator hunting season had a late start, due to Hurricane Isaac making landfall in Louisiana, pressuring hunters to hunt as many gators as they can in a short period of time. Troy takes on his oldest son, Brandon, as his partner after Clint decided to concentrate on his turtle farm, but the storm (which caused the gators to spread out) and a novice partner makes the season more challenging. Furthermore, Troy contends with a couple of out-of-towners from Texas, T-Roy and "Bigfoot", who are hunting in Louisiana not only to take advantage of the more-relaxed hunting regulations, but also to get a head start on their gator hunting, which starts later in Texas. Troy and T-Roy make a friendly wager to see who catches the biggest gator, with Troy hoping that they worry less about Texas being messed with. Also: R.J. and Jay Paul take on 365 tags for the shortened season, as well as a chance to hunt in a territory closer to home, but not only do they have a greater risk of not tagging out in time, Jay Paul also risks his life hunting a gator that had evaded all other efforts. And while Kristi helps clean up her farm after the storm, Liz takes on a temporary replacement for Kristi -- Liz's daughter, Jessica. Liz is especially counting on help from Jessica and Kristi this season, along with new apparatuses to assist her in the hunt, as the removal of her gall bladder earlier in the year precluded her from heavy lifting, but even that will not stop Liz from hunting as many gators as possible.
51	2	"Texas Hold 'Em"	February 21, 2013	4.09
On the second day of gator season, the Landrys are not only struggling to catch gators, they're also struggling to find the biggest gator they can find, in order to win a bet made by Texas boys T-Roy and Bigfoot. While Troy and Brandon hunt in "The Armpit", Jacob and Chase hunt in a gated area of the swamp called "The Gates", where they hope to find the larger gators there. But even though they shoot a gator, it doesn't mean that the gator is either dead -- or wounded. Junior and Willie also began their gator hunt, but Willie questions Junior's ability when not only he let Willie do all the hard work, he also forgot the bullets for the gun, leading Willie to kill the gator the old fashioned way -- with a pocket knife. Bruce and Ron also start their hunt, but their day ended soon after it started when they not only faced closed exits on Interstate 55, but they find that their canal is clogged with Roseau cane, making passage impossible and even getting out just as impossible. And: Glenn Guist, whose home was flooded by Hurricane Isaac, takes time to remember his late brother, Mitchell, who died four months earlier of a heart attack.
52	3	"Floating Dead"	February 28, 2013	4.42
One week into the season, the gator hunters face yet another challenge -- a fish kill caused by the fallen leaves from Hurricane Isaac robbing the fish of precious oxygen. This led Troy and Brandon, and T-Roy and Bigfoot to find other places to hunt, trying not to step on each other. And on Pecan Island, Liz and Jessica are also enduring a fish kill, but they try to use that more to their advantage, by catching catfish that are still alive and using them as bait. And in the northern part of Louisiana near the Arkansas border, another hunting team, Jeromy and David, hunt near Marion, in the search for "The Beast of the East" -- a huge gator that had eluded many hunters in the past, leading to Jeromy and David to hunt using a muzzle-loaded rifle, along with using David's secret "monkey milk" as bait.
53	4	"Bad Mojo"	March 7, 2013	4.46
Roughly a week into the first season, and bad luck remains on the hunters' side all around. The swamps around Pierre Part are being invaded by poachers, stealing valuable gators that were caught by the hunters. However, the poaching problem was further exacerbated by other problems: Troy and Brandon confront T-Roy and Bigfoot for hunting on their turf, which they blame on bad advice from their source. In addition, when T-Roy and Bigfoot catch a sizable gator, another problem lurks overhead when a wasp's nest hovers above the catch site -- and T-Roy is allergic to insect stings with no antivenin on hand. Also: Bruce and Ron's bad luck continue when not only a dam made of Roseau cane was blocking the way, but Bruce's family's fishing camp, where the prize honey hole is located, was literally wiped out by Hurricane Isaac. And another team of hunters was introduced as seasoned hunter Tom mentors 16-year-old ZZ, the son of a hunter who mentored Tom, as they search for gator in Lac des Allemands, near Thibodaux.
54	5	"Blood Lines"	March 14, 2013	4.20
Nine days into the hunting season, the gator hunters desperately look for a good day of hunting, in the face of an already-lackluster start due to Isaac. Jacob and Chase got their chance, when they landed numerous gators. But Junior and Willie's efforts were slowed down when they had to rescue a pack of hunting dogs and a cow from the swamp, causing precious time to be lost. To add insult to injury, a gator they caught was not dead, leading it to bite Willie's fingers and crush his toe, leading to a trip to the hospital. Liz and Jessica try to land a large gator, but when the gator got away, not only did it break Jessica's fishing pole, it also broke her pride. Later, their engine broke when it struck a submerged log, putting their chances of tagging out in jeopardy. And as a cold front enters Northern Louisiana, Jeromy and David find a hot spot where gators are still thriving, except that it is not easily accessible, forcing the guys to enter in a small plastic pirogue with an outboard motor fashioned from a weed eater.
55	6	"Waging War"	March 21, 2013	4.81
About a week and a half into the season, the hunters continue to find the biggest gator they could find during a shortened season. This is especially true for T-Roy and Bigfoot, who will be returning to Texas in a couple of days. They hunt in an area that was teeming with gators, except that their boat may be too big for the hunting grounds. Also: Troy and Brandon hunt in the Intracoastal Waterway, which is not only loaded with tankers and ships, but also with big gators. Meanwhile, Jacob and Chase return to The Gates to hunt "Jaws", a huge gator that they tried to hunt earlier, but got away. And Bruce and Ron hunt The Flats in hopes to reversing their string of bad luck that may not only cost them this season, but next season as well.
56	7	"Deadly Chill"	March 28, 2013	4.56
A cold front had descended onto the swamplands, all but endangering the season as the gators were tricked into going into hibernation. But the hunters have a few tricks up their sleeve to keep the hunt going despite the cooler weather. Jacob and Chase go to a borrow pit, where a levee separates it from the rest of the swamp, preventing cooler water from entering. However, the boys must manage to get their boat over the levee. R. J. and Jay Paul hunt for two massive gators, using a secret method passed down from earlier generations of the Houma people. Bruce and Ron discover that a cannibal gator is eating the smaller gators, leading to the two to find and kill the gator before the canal is depleted of other gators. And Glenn teams up with his friend, T.K., as they go hunting for squirrel.
57	8	"No Surrender"	April 4, 2013	4.19
Today is T-Roy and Bigfoot's final day of gator hunting in Louisiana before returning to Texas for the start of gator season there, working overtime to find the biggest gator they could find and win Troy's bet. Troy and Brandon also work all day at a sure-fire place for big gators -- his secret honey hole. Liz and Jessica resume their hunt after fixing their boat motor, but it may come to a quick end as the heavy weight of the gators endangers Liz's sutures from her gall bladder surgery, leading Jessica to take a big risk to make sure a big gator doesn't get away. And when gators weren't biting in the still-cold waters, R.J. and Jay Paul hunt for gators in the marshlands, hoping their season doesn't come to an early end.
58	9	"Breaking Point"	April 11, 2013	4.11
Two weeks into the season, the hunters are starting to show fatigue, but they soldier on anyway to keep on pace to tag out at the end of the season, despite the difficulties. Jacob was a little perturbed when Chase overslept that morning, showing up late for the hunt, as well as failing to keep on top of his game. Bruce is also having trouble with his hunting mate, Ron, as he missed shots and failed to load his gun at a time when it was needed most. Liz and Jessica, hoping to concentrate more on size than numbers, experience numerous problems when a gator breaks a line, stealing their treble hook, then later, Liz's gun was empty as she tried to fire at another gator. And Junior and Willie's partnership as gator hunters comes to an end after a very frustrated day, which peaked when bullet fragments accidentally hit Willie. Having enough, Willie decides to quit, despite Junior still holding 175 tags to be filled.
59	10	"Cursed"	April 18, 2013	4.48
14 days into the season, the gator hunters already feel that the season had been cursed, but even more so today. Bruce and Ron, who found a yellow gator last season, find two in the same day, making Bruce hesitant to even carry them back on his boat. Troy and Brandon caught two gators which, miraculously, came back to life. One of them after being unloaded at the buyers; to add insult to injury, that gator bit Troy's foot through the boot, causing bleeding and a possible infection that could send him to the hospital. R.J. and Jay Paul face another day with empty lines and an empty marsh, forcing them to seek help from a higher authority -- their tribal elders and the medicine man in a special tribal ceremony. And T-Roy and Bigfoot are back in Texas to begin gator season there, which operates a little differently from in Louisiana -- their first hunt involves a nuisance gator threatening a resident's dogs.
60	11	"Ride or Die"	April 25, 2013	3.95
Midway into the hunting season, the hunters, desperate for help, are counting more and more on their assistants to catch as many gators as they can find, and as always, the bigger the better. Junior, still smarting from Willie's exit from the hunt, recruits his wife, Theresa, to be his assistant, but after a boating accident six years earlier, she is still hesitant to get back on the water, despite willing to do it for family. Jessica had a dream that a very large gator was snagged on the last line of the day, and was anxious to see if it came true, but Liz said that they had to check the other lines first. Tom has doubts on ZZ's abilities of being a gator hunter, as he frequently fools around and doesn't put away tools properly, but following a pep talk, ZZ goes up to bat when they caught a large gator. And David and Jeromy continue their search for "The Beast of the East", having a hunch that he's in a landlocked pond. But in order to get there, they had to trek across land. And Jeromy, though being brave around gators, is scared of snakes.
61	12	"Devoured"	May 2, 2013	3.94
Into the second half of the hunting season, the hunters are finally hitting their stride; however, Mother Nature still calls the shots, putting a monkey wrench into the hunters' plans. The Landrys' prized honey hole is being devoured by a large sinkhole that was created by underground mining, and the lines that they set the day before are at risk of being devoured themselves, leading them to risk their lives to try to get all the lines -- and the gators they snagged. R.J. and Jay Paul return to their marshland to check the lines they set the night before, only to find that lilies have mysteriously appeared overnight, clogging the lines and making retrieving the gators more dangerous. Liz and Jessica look for the "Monster of Monster Marsh", a huge gator that had eluded Liz and her family since her childhood, but the hunt becomes extra risky as a thunderstorm approaches the area. And David and Jeromy continue their search for "The Beast of the East", having actually seen the gator in their sights, only for it to slip through when the battery in their outboard motor dies, leaving them stranded and miles from civilization.
62	13	"Young Blood"	May 9, 2013	3.70
As the hunters are now in the second half of the gator hunting season, the hunters are relying more on their younger partners to hunt bigger and more plentiful gators. But with opportunity comes the risk of danger. Jay Paul and his cousin scout around the swamp in the middle of the night, looking for ideal places to catch gator. Night time is when gators are out looking for food, and when their spotlight burned out, they found themselves eyed for the main course. Willie and Randy are hunting on their own for the first time since Willie split from Junior, in a place called "Gator Heaven", an area of marsh that was never hunted in the last 40 years, providing an opportunity to catch large and plentiful gators. But to get to and from Gator Heaven, they must first go through cottonmouth hell. And it looked to be a great day for hunting for Troy and Brandon, until Brandon told Troy that his boss back in the city needed him to come back to work early, forcing Brandon's hunting season to be cut short and Troy to look for another partner.
63	14	"Deadly Duo"	May 16, 2013	3.76
The gator season is in full swing, but circumstances forced the hunting teams to change partners. Troy, after losing Brandon last episode, steals Chase away from Jacob, but when they yielded only small gators in areas where Chase thought there were giants, he began to entertain second thoughts. Meanwhile, Jacob finds a new partner of his own, Marie Lacoste, a neighbor of his who was also a seasoned gator hunter; he finds out that Marie has hunting methods that he would have never thought of. Liz and Jessica return to Monster Marsh for their final day of hunting together, as Jessica will be returning to her own job; but, as they say, they're saving the best for last, except that "the best" will be difficult to haul back on the boat, especially with their regular boat left behind and Liz still recovering from her surgery. And Jeromy and David take time out away from the marsh to fish out a nuisance gator from a Monroe resident's swimming pool, but the hunt turns bittersweet when the little girl asks what they were going to do with the gator after they catch it. And once they make a promise, they feel obligated to keep it.
64	15	"Lightning Strikes"	May 23, 2013	3.81
With 9 days to go in the season, the gator hunters need every spare moment in order to tag out on time. But once again, Mother Nature has other plans as a front with severe weather crosses across Louisiana. Bruce and Ron decide to take a risk and hunt while it was lightning out, a condition that can by very dangerous for all sportsmen, but the day ended up being a write-off anyway after Tyler, Bruce's trusty dog, falls overboard off the boat's bow as it sped through the bayou. R.J. and Jay Paul hunt in an area called the Boundary Waters, in hopes that the higher waters could mean more gators. David and Jeromy use the rising waters of the storm to take advantage of hunting in an otherwise-inaccessible area called "The Chute", in their continuing search for The Beast of the East, but their incompetence is not only affecting the hunt, it is also straining their friendship. And T-Roy and Bigfoot, striking out after the storm washed their trademark "Marsh Marinade" off their bait, use an alternative that would surely attract gators -- a liver of a wild pig.
65	16	"Sabotaged"	May 30, 2013	3.90
With 8 days to go in the season, the gator hunters find themselves competing with duck hunters, as it is the start of duck season. And some find out that the duck hunters don't always play nice. R.J. and Jay Paul start the day with a little duck hunting themselves before moving on to gator hunting, but not only they found some of their lines knocked down, when they did find a gator, they found themselves without a gun, which they left at home following the duck hunt, forcing them to kill the gator using a more archaic method -- a hammer. Bruce and Ron also found themselves with knocked down lines, leading to Ron to hunt for gator the only other way he knows how -- the sniper way. Liz, without an assistant (with Jessica having gone back to work and Kristi still not available), hires Glenn Guist to be her new assistant; while having fun on the hunt was a sure fire way to lift Glenn's spirits following Mitchell's death, it was several years since Glenn hunted for gator, which concerns Liz a little bit. And Bigfoot is spending more time daydreaming of duck hunting, which caused him to lose scope of hunting for gator in waters that turned colder; and T-Roy is concerned that Bigfoot's dreams of hunting teal will be costing them gators, and it already costed them one.
66	17	"Down Goes the King"	June 6, 2013	3.91
As the season enters its final week, the gator hunters begin to step up their game. However, some teams find themselves shuffling their roster once again. Glenn, who was working with Liz the last couple of days, will be leaving back for Gonzales the next day for family business, and despite their short stint, Liz is sad to see Glenn go already. But before they leave, they had to contend with an area of swamp that is dominated by a cannibalistic gator who eats other gators. But Liz won't be left without a partner, as Kristi, anxious to rejoin the hunt, had become free again to work for her. But before Glenn leaves, Liz gives him a token of appreciation -- one that will actually keep him company. Jacob will also be losing his partner, Marie, also for family matters, but while the hunt increases at a fever pitch, they accidentally wreck their rifle while capturing a gator. Jacob and Marie were also part of Troy's special challenge, where their goal is to capture 25 gators between the two groups. While both teams managed to accomplish that goal altogether, their season was already thrown into doubt when Troy sprained a muscle in his abdomen while hauling a freshly-killed gator aboard his boat. And David and Jeromy continue their search for The Beast of the East, hunting in a small pond accessible only by pirogue, but with only five tags remaining for the season, their chances of capturing The Beast is running out.
67	18	"Blood Runs Deep"	June 13, 2013	3.52
With five days remaining in the season, the hunting teams face challenges that may keep them from tagging out. With Troy ordered from his doctor to stay home to recuperate from his injury, Jacob had his uncle, Guy, help him out in the hunt; however, the prospects of tagging out is in doubt when they found very few gators taking the bait. Liz and Kristi are back as a team, but with Kristi having missed most of the season, Liz is worried that Kristi would be unable to perform at her best, especially after being close to losing her life after falling in the water with a live gator. T-Roy and Bigfoot pay a visit with T-Roy's 70-year-old father, whom he haven't spoken to him in years; he's retiring from gator hunting, so he gave T-Roy the rest of his tags to fill. T-Roy honors his request by taking care of him first, and by fishing in his favorite honey hole, which is accessible only by crossing a 10-foot levee. And Glenn, rejuvenated after his short stint with Liz, is back in Gonzales with T.K., hunting for rabbit and gar for tonight's family get-together.
68	19	"Beast of the East"	June 20, 2013	3.54
With four days remaining in the season, the hunters found themselves doing double the work, when they help out others to tag out, but run the risk of not doing so themselves. But one team was in position to tag out today -- David and Jeromy have two tags left, with one of them reserved for the Beast of the East, which they hope that the extra preparation for the baits would snag the monster gator for sure. Meanwhile, R.J. helps out his cousin Bradley to tag out, but becomes a problem when he find out why he was unable to tag out himself -- the bait was set improperly, keeping the gators from taking it. Jay Paul takes on his mother, Stacey, to fill in while R.J. was away -- while she was a seasoned hunter herself, Jay Paul fears that she's losing her touch with the gun. And Bruce and Ron's chances of tagging out this season becomes a little more distant when they help out another hunter fill his tags.
69	20	"The Reaper"	June 27, 2013	3.65
With three days remaining in the season, the teams scrambles to find alternative methods to catch alligators and tag out. T-Roy and Bigfoot find themselves hunting a serial killer gator named "The Reaper" that has been snatching cattle from ranches in the middle of the night. With so many remaining tags left, and in spite of suffering an abdominal hernia, Troy Landry decides to forgo doctor's orders to rest, and rally his family to complete the hunting season; with his "honey holes" almost tapped out, Troy decides to go deeper into the swamp, only accessible with ATVs. Liz and Kristi decide to try the same, and hunt on land, only to find the process time consuming. And an inspired Glenn, along with his friends, decide to finish work on a houseboat -- a project started by Glenn's late brother Mitchell, but left unfinished following his death.
70	21	"Deadly Divide"	July 11, 2013	3.59
Two days remain in the season, and the hunters prepare to go the limit to tag out for the season. But with a cold front fast approaching, there may be no tomorrow. One method used to hasten the path to the finish line is to split up. The Landrys split back up, with Troy and Chase hunting in the Bayou aux Allemands, an area accessible only by boat and lightly hunted. But if he fails to find gator there, it would be a wasted trip, wasted time, and even wasted tags. Junior and Willie reunite for the first time after the gun incident led to Willie hunting on his own, as tagging out for the family is more important; one sure fire way to catch gators is to use a new treble hook that Junior had made, but his wife, Theresa, fears that it may be too heavy. T-Roy and Bigfoot also split up to complete their hunt, but due to Texas laws, the number of poles cannot exceed the number of tags (among other regulations that differ from Louisiana's), making splitting up and their ingenuity a must. And Glenn and the gang finish work on Mitchell's houseboat, which, in their own way, they christened "Camp Mitchell".
71	22	"No Tomorrow"	July 18, 2013	3.90
On this final day of gator hunting season, the hunters work as hard as possible to tag out in the face of an approaching cold front. And one rule that every hunter should know is to always have a "Plan B". Or in Liz's case, a "Plan Z", as, in order to fill their seven remaining tags, she and Kristi go to a honey hole that hadn't been fished in years, and for good reason -- it has been blocked by a levee. Troy and Chase also visit another honey hole of their own, as an easy way to fill their two last tags, but it is not as easy as it seems, as it has been choked by weeds and a beaver dam. R.J. and Jay Paul have doubts of filling their last nine tags after Jay Paul's dream involving muddy water, a bad omen in the Houma tribe, but an area teeming with gators, but long closed to hunting due to overgrowth, magically clears up. And Bruce and Ron, with only five tags to go at the start of the day (and in better position to tag out, as compared with this time last season), decided to call off the hunt with only one tag remaining when their trusty dog Tyler got sick, with Bruce choosing to end the hunt to get Tyler to the vet. But when they spotted a snagged gator on the way back, Bruce decides to catch it for his last tag, but suddenly becomes dangerous when Bruce attempts to unsnag the gator while on land.
72	23	"Swampsgiving 2"	November 26, 2013	2.14
This special takes another look at the celebration of Thanksgiving by the gator hunters, who, most often than not, prefer other wildlife over turkey for the main course. Troy and Chase made a bet with T-Roy and Bigfoot on who would shoot the largest wild pig, with the loser getting to cook it; while T-Roy and Bigfoot had easy luck on the open lands of Texas, Troy and Chase found it difficult hunting through the dense swampland. Liz and her family try trapping nutria for their Thanksgiving feast, but when they found all their traps empty, they used a more-reliable method -- hunting them down with their rifles. And R.J. and Jay-Paul go fishing for catfish, using a bow and arrow; however, their fishing trip becomes precariously dangerous when a thunderstorm comes near.
73	24	"Ten Deadliest Hunts"	January 27, 2014	2.30
A clip show special, featuring the gator hunter's most-memorable gator hunts.

=== Season 5 (2014) ===
No. overall	No. in season	Title	Original release date	U.S. viewers (millions)
74	0	"Gator Recon"	February 3, 2014	3.11
While making their final 24 hours of preparations for alligator season, hunters take a look back, remembering the struggles, the joys and the dangers they’ve faced over the years fishing alligators. This is a clip show special, featuring the gator hunters' memories of past episodes.
75	1	"Once Bitten"	February 3, 2014	3.97
During the 2013 hunting season, gator hunters face an overabundance of gators, due to a shortened 2012 season; while it has a makings of a lucrative season, the expanded gator population poses a danger to those who live around the swamps. While Chase was away on personal business, Troy enlists his nephew, Holden, to help him out with the hunting, but as he's practically a greenhorn, Troy worries that Holden may do more harm than good for the season. Junior takes on his wife, Theresa, as his assistant after Willie leaves to hunt on his own; however, he may find himself shorthanded again when a gator bites down on Theresa's finger. Terral Evans returns to the series with his partner, Johnny Banks, as they hunt for a gator who had eaten a dog that belonged to Terral's father-in-law; the good news is that the gator is easy to find, as the dog was equipped with a GPS collar, but, it should be known that batteries do not last forever. And a new Native American team, Roger Rivers and Johny Tenner, hunt the swamps near the western Louisiana town of Zwolle, searching for a snapping turtle that could bring the duo good luck for the season ahead.
76	2	"Aerial Assault"	February 10, 2014	3.52
As other hunters start a new, potentially-lucrative gator season, some had to face getting new partners, finding new hunting grounds, or even leaving town altogether. R.J. and Jay Paul found a potential honey hole at Creole Bayou, but it is in an area so remote, they brought a supply boat with them, and planned to camp out overnight. However, they had to jettison the supply boat when a line of sunken pylons got in the way, forcing R.J. and Jay Paul to take the risky step to go on alone. Liz takes on her daughter, Jessica, as partner once again when Liz's regular partner, Kristi, got married and pregnant. But not only is Jessica still acting like a greenhorn, they are also facing someone stealing the gators that they snagged on their lines, forcing them to go the best spot they were saving for last -- Crow's Foot -- weeks early. Jacob is also working under a new partner, Marie, when Chase was unable to leave his office job in California. Marie has a new trick up her sleeve, called the "gator bomb", which includes a secret ingredient that came with Jacob's breakfast: pancake syrup. And David and Jeromy, facing slim pickings in Marion, travel to the Atchafalaya River Basin to an area near Raceland, to connect with a buyer that has 30 tags for them to fill; however, in order to get those tags, they must first hunt a nuisance gator that is endangering a family's children in the area.
77	3	"Gator Jacked"	February 17, 2014	3.07
With gators at an all time high in abundance and market price, everyone is taking advantage -- even gator poachers willing to risk fines and jail time. Troy and Holden find many of their lines cut by a poacher, forcing them to move to a secret honey hole. R.J. and Jay Paul's plan to hunt in Creole Bayou paid off -- however, their celebration was short lived when they found a couple of men hunting out of bounds: David and Jeromy, who was looking for another spot on their own territory after being victimised by poachers themselves. And Willie decides to hunt solo, but with huge gators on the prowl, the biggest challenge is not only the hunting of gator by himself, but also bringing the carcass onto the boat.
78	4	"Gravedigger"	February 24, 2014	3.15
Challenges abound for gator hunters off and on the water, forcing them to find other ways to catch their gators. Junior hires another assistant, Douggie Acosta, to help him out while Theresa's hand is on the mend; however, his class clown attitude may cost Junior precious time -- and his gators. Bruce finally heads out on the hunt, running late due to the owner's delay in getting the tags; however, he goes on the hunt alone, as his assistant, Ron, is on personal business, and his trusty dog, Tyler, was forced into retirement by Bruce, fearing that this season may kill the aged dog. However, the odds continue not to be in his favor when the water levels recede lower than anticipated. Terral and Johnny go on the hunt for another nuisance gator -- a former friendly gator who had "gone rogue" with one of their neighbors. And Roger and Johny are off on their hunt, but when a gator they caught had part of a tail bitten off, they began to look for a cannibal gator they dubbed "Gravedigger", as the gator is "digging his own grave" with his murderous antics.
79	5	"The Albino Assassin"	March 3, 2014	2.22
About halfway into the first week, the big gators and the nuisance gators are still up for grabs, but some of the teams are starting to be frayed around the edges. David and Jeromy, already feeling the pinch of being together at all hours away from home, hunt a gator they call "The Albino Assassin", after finding a chewed-up carcass of an albino alligator. After efforts to catch the gator failed, Jeromy introduces a secret weapon -- a "gut cannon" designed to shoot out chicken offal, in hopes that the stench it emits would bring the gator within shooting range. Liz gets on Jessica's case after Jessica overslept, causing them to get a late start in the day's hunt. But while hunting for a huge gator they nicknamed "Macho Man", tensions between them flare up when they stumble all over each other while catching another gator. Jacob found himself hunting by himself after his assistant, Marie, was forced to leave the hunt early when she got sick. Marie's fears for Jacob were realized when a live gator jumped onto the boat, between Jacob and his gun. And in Texas, T-Roy and Bigfoot, while waiting for the start of gator season there, got a call to hunt a nuisance gator that had eaten one of their neighbor's dogs. But the hunt becomes a rather painful challenge when Bigfoot suffers from a hernia.
80	6	"Hooked"	March 10, 2014	3.16
After the first week passed, some old friends return to help out, though getting used to the swamp again would prove to be a challenge. Chase returns from California to help out Jacob, after Jacob lost his previous assistant, Marie, last episode; however, Chase practically became a greenhorn once again as Jacob figured out that Chase was away from the swamp too long. But when spending a day without catching gators wasn't bad enough, things become more precarious when a hook snagged into Jacob, requiring them to get to the hospital immediately, an emergency mission that became even more dangerous when Jacob lost his key to the boat motor. Troy spends his last day with his assistant, Holden, as he returns to school tomorrow; they make it count by going on the hunt for a large gator called "The Monster of Lake Verret", and Troy makes it count by giving the hunting to Holden. Willie makes a treble hook that he felt would be lighter than the previous hooks, but be just as effective at snagging gators; however, Junior thought that such a design won't work, giving Willie a chance to prove him wrong. And Glenn and TK go hunting for turtle, an important ingredient for tonight's dinner: turtle sauce piquant.
81	7	"Devil at the Door"	March 17, 2014	2.95
As the season marches on, the job of saving the public from rogue gators is more important for gator hunters than hunting for sport. And some that were hunting for sport face challenges that may cause them not to tag out by the end of the season. R.J. and Jay Paul are on a hunt for a one-eyed monster gator that is threatening a day camp for children, but when all efforts to get the gator eluded them, they used for bait the guts of another gator -- which was mauled to death earlier by the monster gator. T-Roy, days before the start of Texas' gator season, hunt a nuisance gator of his own, but all by himself, as Bigfoot continues to recover from his hernia. Junior and Douggie are on their hunt, though Junior's back injury may bring the day -- and the season -- to an early end. And when Liz and Jessica saw that no gators were taking the bait, they started hunting for blackbirds, which they would use as bait, in hopes that the gators find them to be more delectable.
82	8	"Gator Ghost Town"	March 24, 2014	2.79
At this time of the gator season, the swamps are getting busy -- not only with the gator hunters, but for sportsmen looking for other animals to catch, leading them to find alternate plans. Bruce decides to take his dog Tyler out of retirement, as he felt that he needed someone to help him hunt. However, their hunting plans have gone awry when he noticed many other sportsmen going out to hunt or fish, leading him to visit an alternate spot that had gained results in the past: a methane-choked area called "Stinky Bayou". David and Jeromy, after finding out that the hunt in Raceland was not going well, move to swamp land near Violet, near New Orleans; however, things got tense when another hunter told them that they were hunting in the wrong place. But after the problem was resolved, they gave David and Jeromy a tip, to hunt in an area called "Gator Ghost Town", a community of fishing camps that was destroyed in 2005 by Hurricane Katrina. Troy and his brother, Guy, hunt for gator in The Shallows, an area where they hunted since they were kids. But while they caught numerous gators, Troy thinks about someday retiring from the sport and handing it over to his sons Jacob and Chase. Speaking of which, the junior Landrys are looking for a monster gator similar to what they caught this year, naming it "Jaws 2".
83	9	"Hexed"	March 31, 2014	3.15
Strange things have occurred in the swamp, to a point that the hunter's season could be delayed -- or even put to an early end. Roger and Johny hunt in an area called the "Devil's Ditch", a hard-to reach area that's abundant with gators, but also with bad luck, jammed guns, and water moccasins. Junior and Douggie hunt in their favorite honey hole, but found that it was choked with dead fish -- unusual, as it was during nice weather, and not following a storm; with the gators eating the dead fish, they are not taking the bait. Terral and Johnny look for a raccoon that took refuge in their fishing camp; the task becomes even harder to accomplish when the raccoon climbed into the fireplace and up the chimney. And Liz and Jessica suffer bad luck of their own when their rifle jams, only to get even worse when the boat propeller hits something hard, causing it to crack.
84	10	"Rumble in the Swamp"	April 14, 2014	2.23
With two weeks to go in the season, it becomes desperation time for many hunters seeking to tag out on time. And some are more desperate than others. The Landrys win tags to hunt in a territory in the Bayou Sorrel region known to be more lucrative and have monster gators. However, in order to capitalize on their new tags, the family must focus on gators that are eight feet or large in length. Jacob and Chase are given the bulk of the new tags and have great success finding big gators. With Troy and Guy snagging smaller-sized gators, the brothers start to encroach on the territory of their fellow hunter, Junior Edwards. R.J. and Jay Paul hunt in their native area, but forced to move elsewhere when they saw gators who were simply killed and left where they were. And the relationship of David and Jeromy, still hunting in the Violet area in hopes to get gators, has become not unlike The Odd Couple, in which Jeromy wakes up early in order to exercise, while David snores all night and sleeps in until late. But once they began hunting, situations become tense when Jeromy's rifle misfires, leading to David to shoot the gator himself and threaten to toss Jeromy's rifle into the lake.
85	11	"Beast of the Lake"	April 21, 2014	2.77
Troy and Guy, continuing their search for huge gators, are on the hunt for "The Beast of Grand Lake", a large gator that they were after long since their childhood. Willie's gator hunt is endangered when he finds that a cannibal gator is on the loose, killing and injuring other gators to a point where it would affect his payout. T-Roy and Bigfoot's gator season begins in Texas, where their goal of the season is to beat the state record for the largest gator captured. And Liz, suffering from a series of setbacks in the first half of the season and over 300 tags yet to fill, recruits her shrimper husband Justin, to help out with his boat. But he won't be doing it alone - Liz hires a friend she met last season, Glenn Guist, to help out.
86	12	"Way of the Swamp"	April 28, 2014	2.87
In Pecan island, the "Team Liz" group split up, after planning where to go to catch the most gators; of greatest concern was Justin and Glenn, both of whom only have minor experience in gator hunting. Bruce is reunited with his hunting partner Ron, after his family duties had ended, but the reunion might only be brief after a piece of shrapnel hit close to Ron's eye as Bruce shoots a gator. And T-Roy and Bigfoot continue their mission to break Texas' gator record, trying to avoid the smaller gators in the process.
87	13	"Outer Limits"	May 5, 2014	2.58
Liz and Jessica challenge Justin and Glenn to see who could catch the largest gator, but as Liz's usual hot spots are already dried up, she and Jessica hunt for gators in the Intracoastal Waterway. Troy and Guy visit Hog Island to look for a large gator for a fisherman, who says that the gator was chewing up his fishing nets. Bruce and Ron, with 10 tags left, set a goal to tag out early - something that Bruce didn't want to do. And R.J. and Jay Paul try to make up for lost time when a part on their air boat broke the previous night, delaying the cstart of the hunt until after repairs were made.
88	14	"Blood Brothers"	May 12, 2014	2.84
With 11 days remaining in the season, Willie has set his sights on tagging out early, enlisting his brother Randy to help out; when they had two tags remaining, they found a great omen when, at a natural gas pumping station, they spotted two large gators who they suspect to be brothers, because of their behavior. In Violet, it is the last day before Jeromy and David return north to finish the season, and so far, it was all but a bust; they decide to take one last gamble by hunting in the Mississippi Gulf Outlet area, in hopes that the deeper water would mean more gators. Bruce, seeking more tags to continue the season, turn to Junior Edwards for assistance; he gave him a lead to a local hunter who might have some extra tags available, but being late in the season, and with the tags promised to someone else, Bruce runs the risk of being too late. And T-Roy and Bigfoot continue their hunt to break the Texas gator record by hunting for a nuisance gator spotted by a local property owner; the only catch is that this gator is located in an area accessible only by All-Terrain Vehicle.
89	15	"Gator Ambush"	May 19, 2014	2.16
With 8 days remaining in the season, the hunters focus on locating the largest gators they could find, even if it means winning bragging rights on the side. Such was the case for Team Liz, in which Liz and Jessica, once again, split from Justin and Glenn, in hopes that they could find a large gator, one that could beat the other duo. Junior spends his final day of hunting with Douggie, who has his own tags to fill; however, they have been catching mainly small gators this season, and Junior hopes to snag a large gator to serve as a big sendoff for Douggie. Junior had finally found such a gator, which he called "Einstein", for being able to outsmart the hunters, but taking down Einstein would require a lot of strategy and patience on Junior's part. Troy and Brandon go out of town to Chicot State Park in the central part of Louisiana to hunt down a nuisance gator named "Big Boy", which was threatening the campers, though the trip would prove quite dangerous when Brandon accidentally dropped the boat motor keys into the water, with a gator making a bee line towards Brandon as he searches for them. And Jacob and Chase, back in Pierre Part, go on a hunt for their own large gator, "Big Al".
90	16	"Beast or Bust"	June 2, 2014	2.16
With a week remaining in the season, Bruce and Ron hunt for gators in Bayou Piquant, an area that was inaccessible and impassable to boats, but known to be teeming with gators. This would put them into a position to tag out again this season - or so they thought. David and Jeromy are back in the Marion area, in search for huge gators in an area known as The Chute; they especially take a bigger gamble with their lives as they hunt during a thunderstorm. Troy and Brandon continue their hunt for "Big Boy" at Chicot, which became even more personal when they caught the gator, before snapping the line loose. And T-Roy and Bigfoot catch what they thought to be a record-breaking gator - until they noticed part of its tail mauled off, leading them to believe that the real record-breaker was still out there.
91	17	"Captain Invincible"	June 9, 2014	3.04
Five days remaining in the season, Chase takes the captains chair in his and Jacob's boat, but finds out that he was still a greenhorn when he attempts to shoot a gator with an unloaded pistol. Justin and Glenn worked to try to meet their 15 gator minimum quota for Liz, but when an incident gator left Justin's hand bloodied and his rifle twisted, a trip to the emergency room takes a backseat, as Justin decides to soldier on in the gator hunt first. Junior Edwards' wife Theresa rejoins him on the hunt, but becomes concerned when they catch nothing but small gators. And Roger and Johny get into a disagreement when Roger decides to concentrate on a large gator that was haunting him since childhood, while Johny wants to concentrate on tagging out that day, regardless of gator size.
92	18	"Unbreakable Bonds"	June 16, 2014	3.01
Four days remaining in the season, Troy and Brandon use an ATV to go deep into the woods to hunt a gator that is threatening the other gators in his honey hole. Junior and Theresa team up with Willie and Randy in a concerted effort to tag out early that day; if they succeed in doing so, Theresa will get a steak dinner cooked by Junior. T-Roy and Bigfoot are also poised to tag out early, but with only five tags remaining, it is their last chance to break the Texas state record for the largest gator caught. And Terral and Johnny's season came to an abrupt end when, as they were just beginning their hunt that day, Terral was notified that his mother had a stroke, forcing him to head home to make sure she's alright and escort the ambulance as it takes her to the hospital in critical condition.
93	19	"Metalhead"	June 23, 2014	2.85
Two days remaining in the season, it is the final day of Justin and Glenn working as a duo for Team Liz, as they continue the pace to meet their day's goal of filling their tags for gator, an effort that Glenn's brother, Mitchell, would have approved as Glenn returns home. R.J. and Jay Paul return to where they started the season, Creole Bayou, with the goal of ending the season there. David and Jeromy use their final tag to hunt down "Metalhead", a gator that practically evaded all methods of capture. And Bruce and Ron tag out for their third, and final, time this season in what was Tyler's last hunt before retirement. (This episode was dedicated to Tyler, who died April 28, 2014.)
94	20	"Day of Reckoning"	June 30, 2014	3.07
In this season finale, on the last day of gator season, the hunters are within range of tagging out, and they give it all they got to ensure that they do. For the Landrys, it is especially important as, not only Troy was still contemplating about retiring at the end of the season, but also the fact that the Landrys have always tagged out, and failure is not an option. The family split a batch of the 12 remaining tags, of which Jacob and Chase use to hunt gators at a pond separated by a levee. Liz and Jessica are on their own to tag out with their 15 remaining tags, hunting for gator on land - a situation that's not only dangerous for Liz, but also especially dangerous for Jessica. And Terral and Johnny, whose season ended early due to Terral's mother's stroke, hunt for wild boar that they plan on cooking for the end-of-the-season party, of which Terral's mother is the guest of honor following her recovery and discharge from the hospital.
95	21	"Lethal Encounters"	July 7, 2014	1.96
A clip show special featuring moments in which the gator hunters escape with their lives by the skin of their teeth.
96	22	"Swamp Christmas"	December 8, 2014	1.28
As with Thanksgiving, the gator hunters have their own ideas to celebrate Christmas, aligned with Cajun culture. Troy and Jacob catch crabs for their Christmas dinner while Chase was working, only to discover that many of their traps were emptied, suspecting a poacher, until they found out that the poacher... was Chase. Later at the Christmas dinner, Troy appears as Papa Noël, the Cajun version of Santa Claus. R.J. and Jay Paul catch oysters and frogs for the tribe's Christmas feast, where Jay Paul gives his son a special gift that was passed down from generation to generation: a hunting rifle. And Liz and Justin's sons, Destin and Daimian, hunt their first deer, as part of a Christmas celebration that revolves around camouflage.

=== Season 6 (2015) ===
No. overall	No. in season	Title	Original release date	U.S. viewers (millions)
97	1	"Bounty on the Bayou"	February 2, 2015	2.37
At the start of the 2014 hunting season, a local buyer raises the stakes by offering a $10,000 bounty for the longest gator caught within the first 21 days, putting extra pressure on the swamp’s hunters. Troy reunites with his protégé from last season, Holden, only to discover he’s still green—after a close call trying to tackle a massive gator nearly ends in disaster. Meanwhile, Liz teams up with her husband, focusing on quality over quantity to chase the lucrative bounty. Junior and Theresa set out after a legendary gator from Junior’s childhood, a monstrous beast known as "Hercules", while R.J. and Jay Paul return to Creole Bayou—and their roots—in search of a giant gator of their own.
98	2	"Gator Gridlock"	February 9, 2015	2.58
When crowded boat traffic blocks the usual lines, hunters are forced to adapt, changing tactics and abandoning plans to make sure they fill their tags. One team returns after a two-year break and ventures into a remote area, requiring a risky crossing of the mighty Mississippi River’s busy shipping lanes. Another crew avoids both bounty hunters and heavy boat traffic by heading to a secluded spot known as Boudreaux’s Run. Meanwhile, a different team battles treacherous waters, navigating a waterway churned by tugboats and barges as they hunt for gators.
99	3	"Twisted Trouble"	February 16, 2015	2.84
The hunters must lean on decades of instinct to battle the unpredictable forces of Mother Nature. One team makes a life-threatening choice, venturing deep into the swamp to escape rising floodwaters. Another is pushed into open-water hunting after their usual territory becomes overrun with dense, unexplainable swamp grass. Meanwhile, a determined hunter targets a rogue gator that has been threatening his children’s safety. While running his lines, Troy discovers several hooks stripped clean of bait, realizing the culprit is the elusive gator he calls "Twister", a beast he and his brother have been pursuing for years.
100	4	"Feast or Fawn"	February 23, 2015	2.34
Rising waters push the big gators into newly flooded areas in search of prey, forcing hunters to adapt to the changing swamp. One team navigates a perilous canal accessible only by canoe, hoping to land a bounty-winning gator. Another crew relies on an old swamp method known as the "Swamp Cooler" to prevent their boat from running aground. Meanwhile, a different team takes a hidden passageway to reach one of their most challenging hunting grounds.
101	5	"Pirate of the Bayou"	March 2, 2015	2.51
One team sets their sights on a bold, one-eyed gator they’ve been chasing for years. Meanwhile, another hunter is forced to go it alone, taking on a fierce bull gator that keeps snapping his lines and bending his hooks. At the same time, a different crew is on the hunt for a crafty, bait-stealing gator that keeps outsmarting them.
102	6	"Gator Slayer"	March 9, 2015	2.21
The hunters must outwit gators clever enough to avoid their bait. One team turns to local crabbers, hoping to gain an edge with traditional, indigenous bait. Another crew goes old-school, using a primitive alternative to modern hooks, while a different team takes a bold approach—using parts of a cannibal gator as bait to lure in a vicious, gator-eating monster.
103	7	"Bulletproof"	March 16, 2015	2.38
The hunters face some of the craftiest gators yet, relying on trusted deckhands to help turn the tide. One team employs an old-fashioned boat decoy strategy to outwit a massive gator. Another crew experiments with a classic floating bait technique, while a different hunter brings in an extra deckhand to catch up after falling behind on the hunt.
104	8	"Badlands"	March 23, 2015	2.39
The hunters venture into uncharted and treacherous parts of the swamp, facing danger at every turn. One team follows a tip from a local buyer, heading into an area rumored to be cursed. Another navigates a storm-ravaged marsh, battling numerous aggressive gators on precarious dry ground. Meanwhile, a determined hunter sets his sights on an ambitious goal: hauling in 32 gators in a single day.
105	9	"Outlaw & Disorder"	March 30, 2015	2.52
One hunter takes on poachers by setting lines without locator ribbons, relying solely on the "Swamp GPS" in his head to track them. Another team faces a tense standoff with a rival hunter in the swamp but salvages their day through daring open-water hunting. Meanwhile, a third crew is tasked with taking down a brutal bull gator that has been decimating the gator population on a landowner’s property.
106	10	"Crooked Jaw"	April 6, 2015	2.49
One team sets out after a legendary, supposedly cursed gator that has been terrorizing a local crawfisherman. Another team fights to salvage their day after a string of injuries slows them down, while a different hunter makes a costly mistake—forgetting his bullet clip and accidentally sending shrapnel flying toward his deckhand during a gator capture.
107	11	"Blood Moon"	April 13, 2015	2.36
With the final hours of Bounty on the Bayou ticking away, two teams cross state lines into Mississippi, hunting through the night in perilous territory for a prize-winning monster gator. Meanwhile, a third team gets one last shot at success as the day winds down.
108	12	"Bounty or Bust"	April 20, 2015	2.53
The $10,000 bounty deadline has finally arrived. One swamper makes a comeback from injury, determined to claim the prize on the last day. Another hunter heads to a secret spot he’s been saving all season, while a different team races to get their gator across state lines before time runs out. In the end, Troy Landry secures his reign as the King of the Swamp, winning the bounty with a massive gator measuring 11 feet, 10 inches.
109	13	"Royal Reunion"	April 27, 2015	2.49
When questions of integrity arise, the swampers put their own season on hold to do what’s right. One swamper teams up with an old partner to help a family friend clear a rogue gator from their marsh. Another crew pulls double duty, running their lines while tracking a gator they previously sniped but failed to retrieve. Meanwhile, a third team takes on a seemingly indestructible monster gator in a fierce showdown.
110	14	"Bait & Switch"	May 4, 2015	2.05
When hunting grounds fail, swampers must quickly pivot to new areas to save their day. One team takes on the challenge using an old-fashioned motorbike with a sidecar to navigate the swamp. Another crew follows a tip from local crab fishermen in hopes of a big catch, while a third team squares off against a cunning, bait-stealing monster gator.
111	15	"The Three Kings"	May 11, 2015	2.16
Swampers face threats to their communities from rogue predators. One team ventures deep into the woods to capture a gator that has claimed a local fishing hole. Another crew pursues a gator that’s been terrorizing a nearby camp, while a third team tackles the formidable challenge of hunting three separate swamps in search of three massive gators.
112	16	"The Phantom"	May 18, 2015	2.20
Swampers head to remote, untapped honey holes they’ve been saving, hoping to score some end-of-season monster gators. One team faces the perilous waters of a notorious area known as "The Pipeline." Another crew goes after a legendary line-popping gator nicknamed "The Phantom", while a third team ventures deep into a secluded territory famed for its enormous reptiles.
113	17	"Gator Boo-Fay"	June 22, 2015	2.06
Swampers get a rare chance to tag out early, but must act fast to secure their final catches. One team lures gators with a special bait recipe called "Surf and Turf." Another crew is forced to hunt their last tags of the season while navigating the swamp on an ATV. Meanwhile, a third team faces unexpected interference from an unknown intruder setting lines in their territory.
114	18	"Here Gator Gator"	June 29, 2015	2.12
Thick swamp grass and dense lily fields bring hunters to a halt, forcing swampers to adapt and make the most of their day. When one team’s prized honey hole is blocked by reeds, they turn to a secret luring technique to stay in the hunt. Another hunter focuses his final tag on capturing a legendary gator named "Cujo", while a third team navigates dangerous confrontations caused by the swamp’s ever-changing landscape.
115	19	"Of Gods & Otters"	July 6, 2015	2.01
With the season’s clock ticking, hunters turn to a little divine intervention to finish strong. One team burns sage in hopes of breaking a streak of bad luck. Another looks for guidance and inspiration at a local church, while a third is fueled by determination to outdo their father by catching a massive monster gator.
116	20	"Now or Never"	July 13, 2015	2.28
On the season’s final day, two families rally their troops, pushing and inspiring each other to secure a strong finish. One hunter pits his sons against each other in a contest to see who can catch the biggest gator, while another reassembles her team one last time to ensure she can tag out before the season ends.

=== Season 7 (2016) ===
No. overall	No. in season	Title	Original release date	U.S. viewers (millions)
117	1	"High Water Hell"	February 8, 2016	2.07
As the season kicks off, King of the Swamp Troy Landry faces a fierce showdown with Mother Nature. Record-high basin waters have driven the gators into remote back ponds and wooded areas, while a cold front sweeping through Louisiana makes conditions even more brutal. As Troy and his family brace for what could be their toughest season yet, he receives more unwelcome news: R.J. and Jay Paul have encroached on his territory, using their airboat to reach gators he can’t. Meanwhile, in Hammond, Bruce Mitchell begins his second season without his beloved hunting dog, Tyler. His partner, Ron Methvin, thinks he has a clever surprise in store, but the plan backfires, putting their partnership to the test. By the end of the first day, Troy delivers an announcement that shakes his family to its core.
118	2	"The Code of the Swamp"	February 15, 2016	2.08
After the worst start of his alligator season ever, a desperate Troy Landry makes a bold move, enlisting outside help despite objections from his sons, Jacob and Chase, and his brother, Guy. The Edgar family, a Creole crew from the south, steps in—but can they rescue Troy’s season from disaster, or will their presence sow discord among the Landrys? Over in Hammond, Ron is determined that his puppy, Gunner, will follow in the footsteps of Bruce’s legendary gator dog, Tyler, and earn his spot on the boat—but first, Gunner has to prove himself. Meanwhile, a new duo known as "Salt and Pepper" makes their debut. Armed with unconventional methods and unshakable faith in God, they are determined to claim their share of the swamp.
119	3	"All Hands on Deck"	February 22, 2016	2.07
Despite his worst start ever, the King of the Swamp, Troy Landry, is determined to fill his 500-plus tags this season. Armed with the help of fellow swamper Daniel Edgar’s family, he battles high water and frigid weather in true Cajun fashion. Meanwhile, Frenchy Crochet and Gee Singleton see their best-laid plans literally blow up in their faces—threatening to derail their season before it even begins. Over in Houma, R.J. and Jay Paul continue their fast-paced start to the season and reveal a surprising family secret.
120	4	"Home Turf"	February 29, 2016	1.99
Despite the support of the Edgar family, the King of the Swamp, Troy Landry, is still behind on his tag count. With the Edgars gone, Troy must dig deep and rally his troops if he hopes to tag out this season. Meanwhile, back on their home turf, Daniel, Joey, and Dorian Edgar are ready to fill their boats with gators—but unexpected obstacles threaten to complicate their mission. And as always, Glenn Guist thrives in the swamp, putting food on the table in his own surprising and unmistakably “Guisty” ways.
121	5	"Monster Men"	March 7, 2016	1.98
Willie Edwards returns this season, striking out on his own. Equipped with his signature treble hook, he finds himself blindsided by the biggest monster he’s ever faced—and a fierce battle ensues. Down south, Daniel Edgar takes on a long-time nemesis, a gator that has haunted him for years. Over in Houma, R.J.’s season hangs in the balance after a serious injury. Meanwhile, the Salt and Pepper duo, Frenchy and Gee, dig deep into their faith as Frenchy sets out to confront a beast that has been tormenting him in his dreams.
122	6	"The Party's Over"	March 14, 2016	2.14
When Daniel Edgar’s boys arrive late and hungover, the celebration comes to an abrupt halt. Meanwhile, Troy faces off against a poacher, while Willie takes a huge risk in his pursuit of the biggest gator he’s ever hooked. Over in Hammond, Ron works tirelessly to earn his puppy a second chance with Bruce.
123	7	"Sweet Revenge"	March 21, 2016	2.06
Troy taps into an old family secret to turn his luck around. Meanwhile, R.J. and Jay Paul clash with the Edgar family as they hunt the same territory, sparking fierce competition. Over in the swamp, Glenn Guist practices his unique "Swamp Medicine" while honoring the memory of his brother, Mitch.
124	8	"Gamblin' Man"	March 28, 2016	1.88
Troy and his family push their season to the edge, taking a bold gamble on a new hunting territory. R.J. goes solo and confronts some hard truths about the hunt. Meanwhile, Bruce puts Ron’s puppy to the test, and Frenchy and Gee venture into "hog heaven" in pursuit of their next big catch.
125	9	"Better Late Than Never"	April 4, 2016	1.82
Troy answers the code of the swamp, stepping in to help an old-timer with his lines. Meanwhile, Jacob’s brother, Chase, is a no-show, leaving the Landrys struggling to keep up. Over in Hammond, Ron’s puppy, Gunner, finally gets his chance to prove himself, while Dorien faces the biggest challenge of his hunting career.
126	10	"Cannibal Country"	April 11, 2016	1.85
Troy goes head-to-head with a cannibal gator that could derail his entire season. In Houma, Jay Paul inches closer to taking control of the Molinere gator-hunting operation. Meanwhile, in Pierre Part, Chase fights to redeem himself, and in Gonzales, Glenn Guist takes on the formidable “Leaning House of Louisiana.”
127	11	"Big Claw"	April 18, 2016	1.88
Troy and Guy set their sights on what could be the biggest gator of their season. In Houma, Jay Paul makes a bad call that could cost him and his father a fortune. Meanwhile, in Franklin, Daniel Edgar’s obsession pushes him to the edge, while Glenn Guist relies on a clever swamp trick to get his boat to a favorite fishing hole.
128	12	"Home Stretch"	April 25, 2016	1.65
As the season nears its end, Troy and Guy race to fill their tags. Jacob and Chase have an unexpected encounter while fishing in their backyard. Meanwhile, the Edgar family hits a cold streak as their lines come up empty, and Bruce and Ron push puppy Gunnar to the ultimate test.
129	13	"End of The Line"	May 2, 2016	1.82
On the season’s final day, the Landrys race to tag out—but they face competition as R.J. and Jay Paul invade their territory, eager to claim their own catches. Meanwhile, the Edgars make one last push to haul in their final gators, calling on a little help from friends.

=== Season 8 (2017) ===
No. overall	No. in season	Title	Original release date	U.S. viewers (millions)
130	0	"Ten Most Dangerous Moments"	February 16, 2017	1.88
A countdown of the swamp’s most treacherous gator battles, featuring hair-raising close calls and near-death encounters from the past seven seasons.
131	1	"The Hunt Begins"	February 16, 2017	2.55
With the buyer threatening an early shutdown this season, Troy promotes Chase to captain his own boat. Daniel Edgar enlists his son to help fill their remaining tags, while R.J. and Jay Paul take a bold step, hunting on separate boats for the very first time.
132	2	"Fresh Blood"	February 16, 2017	2.36
Chase misses his second day as captain, leaving Troy’s crew scrambling. Dwaine fights to live up to his father’s high expectations, while rising bayou floods open new hunting grounds for Frenchy and Gee. Glenn Guist returns home for the first time since a devastating flood, only to find himself facing some unwelcome guests on his property.
133	3	"Breakdown"	February 23, 2017	1.93
After a rocky start, Chase fights to redeem himself and earn back his dad’s trust. Daniel sets a catch quota for his family, pushing them to stay on track for the season. Jay Paul and Tommy take a bold risk, jumping a levee to access new hunting territory, while Will struggles under the relentless heat, breaking down alone in the blazing sun.
134	4	"Vampire Gator"	March 2, 2017	2.38
A vampire gator wreaks havoc across Troy’s hunting grounds. Dwain and Daniel Edgar work to find their rhythm and get the season back on track. Meanwhile, R.J. reunites with his brother Al for their first hunt together since they were teenagers. Willie battles to get his season moving, and Bruce, Ron, and puppy Gunner venture into uncharted territory in search of gators.
135	5	"Landry vs Landry"	March 9, 2017	2.10
Troy raises the stakes with a high-stakes bet against Chase and Holden. Daniel’s nonstop bragging begins to wear on Dwaine. Meanwhile, puppy Gunner stirs up trouble for Bruce, and Gee takes the reins on Frenchy’s boat.
136	6	"Big Boy McCoy"	March 16, 2017	2.24
Chase sets his sights on the biggest gator he’s ever encountered. Daniel pushes Dwaine’s patience to the limit. Kristi works to clear invading gators from her homestead, protecting her property. Meanwhile, Frenchy’s day takes an unexpected turn.
137	7	"Pressure's On"	March 23, 2017	2.17
Dwaine reaches his breaking point, struggling under the pressure of the swamp. Willie comes to the harsh realization that his season is costing him more than it’s earning. Meanwhile, Kristi teams up with her son for a day on the hunt, and Glenn achieves a lifelong dream.
138	8	"Good Luck, Bad Luck"	March 30, 2017	1.96
Troy leans on a Landry lucky charm to turn his season around, while Chase and Holden try to make their own luck. Jay Paul and Tommy take on a cunning escape-artist gator named Houdini, testing their skills to the limit. Kristi fights to protect her land from invading gators, and Willie faces off against persistent poachers.
139	9	"Busting Chops"	April 6, 2017	2.05
Daniel and Dwaine work to mend their strained relationship. Meanwhile, R.J. and Jay Paul go head-to-head in a fierce showdown for territory and gators. Jacob challenges Troy at every turn, while Glenn must figure out a way to repay a friend.
140	10	"Stranded"	April 13, 2017	1.77
Bruce receives word that his buyer is closing early, putting pressure on his season. Troy issues a strict mandate: only big gators will do. Meanwhile, Joey and Dorien find themselves stranded, and Frenchy and Gee take on a second job, hustling to earn extra cash while keeping up with the hunt.
141	11	"Brutus The Cannibal"	April 20, 2017	1.96
Chase gets a taste of his own medicine, while Daniel reveals a secret honey hole. Frenchy and Gee face off against a ruthless cannibal gator. Meanwhile, Glenn embarks on a new business venture.
142	12	"Time's Running Out"	April 27, 2017	1.84
Troy confronts Chase about his obsession with sniping gators, while Joey sets his sights on his elusive "white whale." Willie faces pressure as his buyer threatens to close early. Meanwhile, Frenchy and Gee push hard to fill their final tags, targeting big-money gators.
143	13	"Racing Sundown"	May 4, 2017	1.91
Willie races against the clock to tag out before his buyer shuts down for the season at day’s end. Troy hangs more lines than ever, with the Landrys pushing hard to beat sundown. Daniel’s day takes a turn for the worse, while Jay Paul focuses on hunting the land right next to his own home.
144	14	"The Hunt Ends"	May 11, 2017	1.76
On the final day of the season, Troy’s future as a gator hunter hangs in the balance. The Edgars face the daunting challenge of filling more tags on the last day than ever before. Meanwhile, R.J. puts Jay Paul to the ultimate test, challenging his skills as captain.
145	15	"Monster in the Dark"	May 18, 2017	2.24
Troy Landry and his nephew Holden venture into the Florida Everglades to assist friends whose lands are being terrorized by unknown beasts.
146	16	"Savage Pursuit"	May 18, 2017	2.15
Troy ventures into the deepest, darkest corners of the Everglades to track down a formidable Nile crocodile.

=== Season 9 (2018) ===
No. overall	No. in season	Title	Original release date	U.S. viewers (millions)
147	0	"Ten Most Legendary Monsters"	February 1, 2018	1.59
A countdown of the ten most legendary monsters of the swamp.
148	1	"Never Surrender"	February 1, 2018	2.09
With the alligator industry on the brink, Troy pushes the Landry family to hunt fast and cut costs. Holden struggles to break old habits, while Chase slips back into his careless ways. Meanwhile, Dorien Edgar makes a dramatic choice that could change his season, and the Molinere crew switches roles, shaking up their hunting strategy.
149	2	"Cajun Cartel"	February 1, 2018	1.79
Chase and Jacob clash over control of the boat. Meanwhile, Holden steps up to prove his skills, and Daniel experiments with a new deckhand to keep his season on track. Bruce and Ron’s partnership faces a critical test.
150	3	"Bruce's Dilemma"	February 8, 2018	1.60
Bruce confronts the toughest decision of his career. Dwaine pushes Joey's boat to its limits in a high-stakes hunt. Meanwhile, Daniel returns to a notorious monster's lair.
151	4	"Hunting Houdini"	February 15, 2018	1.34
Troy puts his sharpshooting skills to the ultimate test, while Frenchy ventures into uncharted territory. Jay Paul and R.J. go after their long-time nemesis, the elusive gator Houdini. Meanwhile, Kristi hunts with determination, aiming to earn enough to fund a new hay barn.
152	5	"Hell Rains Down"	February 22, 2018	1.52
Amid a tropical storm, Troy risks crossing a treacherous lake. Daniel takes his hunt into the Gulf of Mexico, facing unpredictable waters and wildlife. Meanwhile, Jay Paul and R.J. push hard, trying to outrun Mother Nature.
153	6	"Texas 911"	March 1, 2018	1.49
Troy, R.J., and Bruce respond to an urgent plea from friends in Texas, heading into the aftermath of Hurricane Harvey to help fill gator tags.
154	7	"Texas Tag Out"	March 8, 2018	1.68
The Cajun Cartel moves in, trying to tag out gators for Texas hunters recovering from Hurricane Harvey. Back in Louisiana, Jay Paul’s reunion with an old friend causes serious problems.
155	8	"Hotter Than Hell"	March 15, 2018	1.84
Willie employs a radical new strategy, while Stringbean steps up. Jay Paul struggles with a moral dilemma. Meanwhile, Glenn takes on a risky new hobby.
156	9	"Swamp Ninja"	March 22, 2018	1.77
Frenchy uses a secret weapon to break new ground, while Daniel suffers at the hands of poachers. Bruce invents a contraption, hoping to save his season. Meanwhile, Dwaine tries to prove himself to his older brother.
157	10	"Cajun Combat"	March 29, 2018	1.61
The Cajun Cartel work together, devising a plan to pool their resources and push back.
158	11	"Comeback Kings"	April 5, 2018	1.85
The Landrys' best hunting grounds are under siege. Meanwhile, Big Tee sets a lofty goal, and Glenn mines for swamp cash.
159	12	"Black Lagoon Battle"	April 12, 2018	1.92
The Landrys put family pride on the line, Willie ventures into mysterious territory, and Kristi answers a call for help.
160	13	"Poacher From Hell"	April 19, 2018	1.89
The Edgars battle family problems, while Frenchy unleashes a radical strategy. Meanwhile, R.J. encounters a crisis.
161	14	"Savage Showdown"	April 26, 2018	1.57
Troy protects locals, and Big Tee reveals a secret. Meanwhile, Willie makes a big gamble.
162	15	"Swamp Savage"	May 3, 2018	1.80
The Edgars go head-to-head, while Jay Paul and R.J. hunt down a ruthless killer. Kristi and Stringbean hit a snag.
163	16	"Lone Hunter"	May 10, 2018	1.69
Willie has troubles with his treble hooks, while Kristi hunts on her own. Chase and Jacob stalk a menacing giant, and Glenn goes on a ghost hunt.
164	17	"Lockjaw"	May 17, 2018	1.64
A strong cold front sweeps over the swamp, threatening to shut the season down early.
165	18	"Speed Demons"	May 24, 2018	1.60
Troy devises a bold new strategy, while Daniel goes after an old nemesis. Joey and Dwaine push their boat to the limit, putting the pedal to the metal. Meanwhile, Frenchy takes a gamble, rolling the dice in hopes of a big payoff.
166	19	"Danger Zone"	May 31, 2018	1.57
Troy pushes his luck as Willie races against the clock. Meanwhile, Frenchy goes back to the future.
167	20	"United We Stand"	June 7, 2018	1.61
Mother Nature serves up an unexpected disaster.

=== Season 10 (2019) ===
No. overall	No. in season	Title	Original release date	U.S. viewers (millions)
168	1	"Clear and Present Danger"	January 31, 2019	1.62
The swampers face a massive gator invasion threatening their community like never before. Determined to protect their neighbors, Troy teams up with swamp legend Terrel Evans, while Jacob enlists python expert Dusty Crum to aid in the hunt. Veteran swamper Ronnie Adams pushes his new partner, Ashley "Dead-Eye" Jones, to the limit as they venture into the perilous swamp known as "The Cemetery."
169	2	"Click Click"	February 7, 2019	1.53
R.J. and Jay Paul battle a gator explosion on sacred ground, while Ronnie and Ashley track a sinister dinosaur terrorizing a community. Joey has a new secret weapon, hoping to bag more predators than ever before.
170	3	"Leviathans"	February 14, 2019	1.61
Joey and Zak need a bird’s-eye view to find the beast breaking all of their lines, while Ronnie and Ashley take a gamble by pursuing gators on land. Meanwhile, Jacob and Dusty try their luck hunting giant beasts in a small boat.
171	4	"No Man's Land"	February 21, 2019	1.61
As the hunters venture deep into the swamp, Joey and Zak take an off-road buggy in pursuit of a giant bull gator. Daniel and Big Tee trek over land to reach a distant honey hole, while Willie seeks to settle an old score in the eerie Black Lagoon. Meanwhile, Frenchy and Gee give their boat an upgrade using a Cajun trick.
172	5	"Cow Killers"	February 28, 2019	1.58
Daniel and Big Tee respond to an urgent call for help from an old friend, while Troy and Terral pursue a slippery old nemesis. Ronnie and Ashley bring out a secret weapon to bag colossal gators, and Frenchy rolls up his sleeves to protect his own land.
173	6	"Bringing the Heat"	March 7, 2019	1.37
As the swampers endure the sweltering heat, Ronnie pushes himself to the limit. Troy and Terral embark on an overnight mission to protect a state park, while Dusty calls on some Everglades magic to gain an edge in the hunt. With Big Tee sidelined by injury, Daniel takes on a risky solo mission.
174	7	"Cajun Cyclone"	March 14, 2019	1.61
As a major storm rages the Gulf Coast, Troy, Terral, Jacob, and Dusty race to run their lines before the storm sinks their gators. Meanwhile, a broken water pump threatens to sink Frenchy and Gee in the middle of a thunderstorm, while severe lightning forces Ronnie and Ashley to take emergency shelter.
175	8	"Raising the Stakes"	March 21, 2019	1.72
Ronnie scores extra tags in a poker game, and he and Ashley are eager to fill them and cash in. R.J. and Jay Paul pursue a bold beast that’s encroaching on their family land, while Troy sets up a nocturnal stakeout to catch the mysterious poacher targeting his lines. Meanwhile, Joey and Zak track a vicious cannibal gator that’s terrorizing other gators in their territory.
176	9	"Hungry for More"	March 28, 2019	1.57
Before heading back to Florida, Dusty is determined to help Jacob catch a massive gator that’s been preying on other gators. Frenchy and Gee hunt the cunning beast that’s been stealing all their bait, while Troy and Terral relentlessly track the deadly giant responsible for killing their neighbor’s dog. Meanwhile, Willie goes after a 900-pound monster that’s been taking bites out of his catches.
177	10	"Night Terrors"	April 4, 2019	1.44
The Swampers brave eerie waters to hunt creatures after dark. Ashley and Ronnie battle flying carp in Mississippi while catching elusive gators at night, while Frenchy and Gee go frogging for a tasty delicacy. In a time honored tradition, Jacob and Holden pursue frightening gar fish. Meanwhile, on an overnight bow fishing adventure, R.J. shows Jay Paul that he’s still the hunter to beat, and Daniel and Joey show Zak how shrimpin’ is done in the Gulf.
178	11	"Wild Wild Swamp"	April 11, 2019	1.54
Troy and his armada of boats take an overnight trip to the legendary hunting ground, Cow Island. Joey and Zak go on a special mission to protect the Edgar’s hometown, while Daniel takes matters into his own hands to deal with a poacher. Meanwhile, R.J. and Jay Paul are forced to snipe gators from long range after a bad "fish kill" means easy eating.
179	12	"Legends of the Swamp"	April 18, 2019	1.44
Joey and Zak relentlessly pursue the mysterious gator known as the Phantom, while Ronnie and Ashley venture into Dead-End Bayou and raise the stakes with a side bet. Troy spends the day with a swamp legend, while engine trouble threatens to leave Willie stranded, ruining his hunt for giant monsters.
180	13	"Rolling with the Punches"	May 2, 2019	1.36
In the race to tag out, the hunters are pulling out all the stops. Daniel and Big T use a special bait, while Ashley surprises Ronnie with a secret weapon of her own. Frenchy needs "Cinderella" to reach a remote honey hole, but can his trusty boat handle these oversized beasts? Meanwhile, Willie goes all out to take down an old nemesis.
181	14	"Tag Out or Die Trying"	May 9, 2019	1.26
On the last day of gator season, the race is on to tag out. Troy and his armada are out in full force, ready to do whatever it takes to fill every last tag. Daniel and Big T search for the elusive predator, "Black Gold," while Joey and Zak venture onto sacred ground looking to track down giant monsters. Meanwhile, R.J. and Jay Paul face a major problem that could jeopardize their entire season.
182	15	"Voodoo Python"	May 16, 2019	1.25
In this special episode, Troy Landry is still battling monsters in the swamp, despite gator season being over. A snake invasion threatens the community, and Troy calls in some friends to help him hunt the sinister Voodoo Python.
183	16	"Crocogator"	May 23, 2019	1.29
In this special episode, Troy heads to the Everglades to help a friend hunt down mysterious invasive species that are terrorizing locals, including massive hybrid snakes and the fabled "crocogator."
