= Belle River, Louisiana =

Belle River
- Unincorporated community
- Location of Belle River in Louisiana
- Coordinates: 29°53′17″N 91°12′23″W
- Country: United States
- State: Louisiana
- Parish: Assumption
- Time zone: UTC-6 (CST)
  - Summer (DST): UTC-5 (CDT)
- Area code: 985

Belle River is a small unincorporated community in the U.S. state of Louisiana that spans 3 square miles. It is situated on the eastern side of the Avoca Island Cutoff and the far west side of Shell Beach Road

It is in situated partially in Assumption Parish and bisected by Louisiana Highway 70 about 5–6 miles (8–9 km) south of Pierre Part and about 13 miles (21 km) north of Morgan City.

On the Assumption Parish side, this sector of the town of Belle River follows its namesake and visitors and residents travel the length of the community by way of Louisiana Highway 1016-2 (South Belle River Road) on one end of Highway 70 and then on the other side by Bayou Goddell Road.

On the other side of the river the community continues to line the River and is situated in Lower St. Martin Parish. Highway 70 leads through the community towards Grave Yard Island where the community traditionally ends on that sector. On the other end the community follows Louisiana Highway 996 towards Belle River Landing which is situated between Belle River and Bayou Pigeon.
