= Pierre Part, Louisiana =

Pierre Part, Louisiana French: Ville de Pierre Part
- Census-designated place
- Location of Pierre Part in Louisiana
- Coordinates: 29°57′40″N 91°12′24″W
- Country: United States
- State: Louisiana
- Parish: Assumption

Area
  - Total: 3.08 sq mi (7.98 km^{2})
  - Land: 3.07 sq mi (7.96 km^{2})
  - Water: 0.012 sq mi (0.03 km^{2})
- Elevation: 3 ft (0.91 m)

Population (2020)
  - Total: 3,024
  - Density: 984.2/sq mi (379.99/km^{2})
- Time zone: UTC-6 (CST)
  - Summer (DST): UTC-5 (CDT)
- ZIP code: 70339
- Area code: 985
- FIPS code: 22-60075

Pierre Part (French: Ville de Pierre Part) is a census-designated place (CDP) in Assumption Parish, Louisiana, United States. As of the 2020 census, Pierre Part had a population of 3,024. With 39.3 percent of the population speaking French at home, Pierre Part was the most francophone town in the United States (by percentage) outside of Maine in the 2000 census. Pierre Part is known locally for its prominent French influence and ancestry, which have become significant aspects of its contemporary local culture. Situated near Lake Verret, Pierre Part is a popular local destination for water sports and fishing during the summer.

== History ==
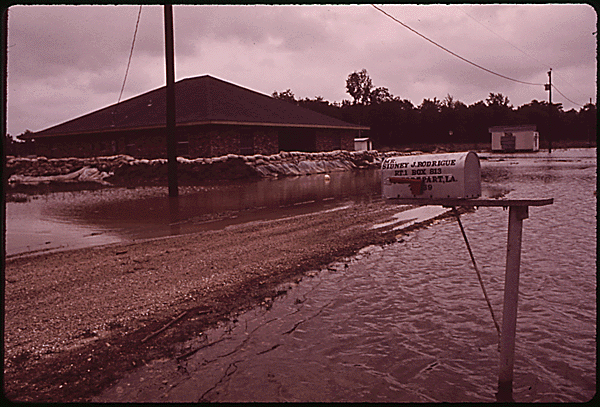
1973 Flood

Pierre Part was founded by Acadian French settlers after the Great Upheaval of 1755, during which much of the French population of Acadia (now Nova Scotia) was expelled by its British conquerors.

The town, Pierre Part is named for Pierre Part, who was exiled from Port Royal, Acadia, and arrived in Spanish Louisiana in 1766. (6) Pierre came with his wife Marguerite Melancon, a son and daughter. They were to have 4 more children before Pierre died the 3rd of October 1826. His descendants are still living in the area. The town remained isolated from most of the world, since it was surrounded by water and was inaccessible by land until the mid-twentieth century. Before the Great Depression, the inhabitants of Pierre Part were fishermen and alligator hunters; after the Depression, many men of the town were forced to find work in other fields including logging, levee building, and the growing petroleum industry in Louisiana. Fewer people continue the traditional ways of fishing and living off the land with each generation.

Pierre Part experienced flooding when the Morganza Spillway was opened during the 1973 Mississippi River flooding.

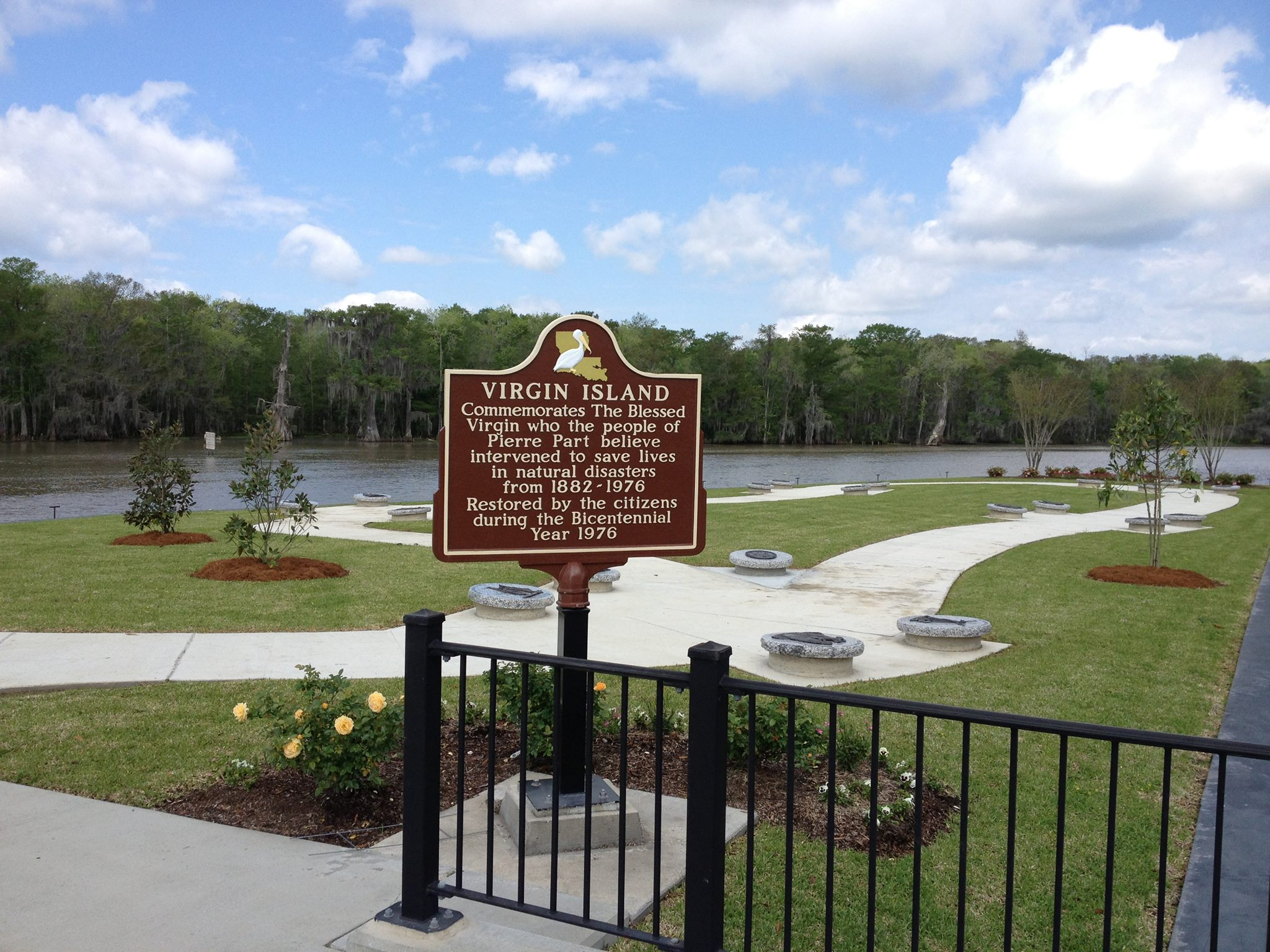
Virgin Island

The History Channel's reality show, Swamp People, features the Landry family, a Cajun family who lives in Pierre Part; the series debuted on History in 2010.

On August 3, 2012, the Bayou Corne Sinkhole, situated roughly 3 miles from Pierre Part, appeared. In areas of Pierre Part near the sinkhole, residents reported gaseous odors and strange bubbling in local waterways, prompting Governor Bobby Jindal to issue an evacuation order for the nearby community of Bayou Corne. The sinkhole expanded significantly during the months after it first appeared, invoking fear in residents of Pierre Part due to what was perceived to be an imminent threat to the community. Significantly, the sinkhole continued to grow in the direction of Louisiana Highway 70, the main highway on which most residents drove. Public outrage to the events in Bayou Corne was largely directed towards Texas Brine Company, the salt mining company perceived to be chiefly responsible for the disaster; a class-action lawsuit against Texas Brine ensued. However, a 2018 court ruling declared the fault to be shared between three companies: Occidental Chemical was 50% at fault, Texas Brine was 35% at fault, and Vulcan was 15% at fault. As of 2019, the sinkhole continues to expand, albeit slowly, and the community of Bayou Corne remains deserted, with most homes commercially demolished.

== Geography ==
Pierre Part is located at 29°57′40″N 91°12′24″W (29.960975, -91.206612). According to the United States Census Bureau, this Census Designated Place has a total area of 3.08 square miles (7.98 km^{2}), of which 3.07 square miles (7.95 km^{2}) is land and 0.012 square miles (0.03 km^{2}), or 0.37%, is water.

== Demographics ==
Historical population
Census	Pop.	Note	%±
1980	3,153		—
1990	3,053		−3.2%
2000	3,239		6.1%
2010	3,169		−2.2%
2020	3,024		−4.6%
U.S. Decennial Census; 1950 1960 1970 1980; 1990 2000 2010

Pierre Part first appeared as a census designated place the 1980 U.S. census.

Pierre Part racial composition as of 2020
Race	Number	Percentage
White (non-Hispanic)	2,880	95.24%
Black or African American (non-Hispanic)	4	0.13%
Native American	1	0.03%
Asian	10	0.33%
Other/Mixed	56	1.85%
Hispanic or Latino	73	2.41%

According to the 2020 United States census, there were 3,024 people, 1,099 households, and 625 families residing in the CDP.

== Education ==
Pierre Part is part of the Assumption Parish public school system.

- Pierre Part Primary School
- Pierre Part Middle School
- Assumption High School (located in Napoleonville)

== Transportation ==
Louisiana Highway 70 runs through and serves as the main highway for Pierre Part . Other highways that serve the community include Louisiana 997, Louisiana 1015–1, Louisiana 1015–2, Louisiana 1016–1, and Louisiana 1016–2.

== Notable people ==
- Cliff Crochet, professional bass fisherman and competitor on the Bassmaster Elite Series
- Troy Landry, TV personality starring in Swamp People. Nicknamed "King of the Swamp" in the series.
- Pierre Part, the man the city is named for, and one of the earliest settlers in the area.
