= Pecan Island, Louisiana =

Unincorporated community in Louisiana, U.S.

Pecan Island
- Unincorporated community
- Location in Louisiana Pecan Island (the United States)
- Coordinates: 29°38′48″N 92°27′11″W
- Country: United States
- State: Louisiana
- Parish: Vermilion

Pecan Island (French: La Pacanière) is an unincorporated community is located in Vermilion Parish, Louisiana, directly south of the southeast corner of White Lake, Louisiana, at the junction of two prehistoric beach ridges of a type known as cheniers, that lie surrounded by coastal marsh. Pecan Island lies in the Texas-Louisiana Coastal Marshes of southern Louisiana about 10 mi (16 km) north of the Gulf of Mexico. There exists minimal land in the region, with the island being "an old Gulf beach, composed of crushed shells and sand".

== Local geomorphology ==
The community of Pecan Island, Louisiana, lies on the eponymous Pecan Island. The southern edge of the latter consists of a single, prominent west to east trending chenier, called Front Ridge, from which other cheniers branch of it in an northeasterly direction. The most prominent of these cheniers is known as Back Ridge. It is at the junction of Back and Front ridges that the community of Pecan Island lies. In addition from the northern side of Back Ridges, several addition smaller cheniers branch off of it.

Pecan Island, Louisiana, 1979 USGS Topographic Map Mosaic with Shaded Relief Base

Front Ridge has a maximum elevation of about 2 m (7 ft) above sea level. It consists of a lens of shelly, fine sand overlying muddy brackish and salt marsh deposits. dating Radiocarbon ages of shells from Front Ridge range in age from 1,250 to 6,000 B.P. Gould and McFarlan consider the Front Ridge segment of Pecan Island to be the eastern end of the longest continuous chenier-ridge trend, known as the Grand Chenier trend, within the Louisiana Chenier Plain. The Grand Chenier trend is considered to be part of a 1100-year-old shoreline. Based on the interpretation of the observed layering of and shells found in both the fine sand underlying muddy sediments, Front Ridge is an erosional (transgressive) shoreline similar to the modern Louisiana Chenier Plain coastline. It is evident that Front Ridge truncates the other cheniers, e.g. Back Ridge, Lost Island, and Kochs Ridge, that comprise Pecan Island.

Back Ridge consists of fine sand consisting of about 50 percent fine sand and 50 percent marine shell fragments. Unlike the Front Ridge, the shelly sands of the Back Ridge overlie muddy shallow marine or mudflat sediments. Younger marsh sediments overlie mudflat sediments and onlap onto the shelly beach sediments comprising Back Ridge. Radiocarbon ages from Black Ridges and associated, smaller cheniers range from about 1,600 to 4,200 years B.P. Back Ridge, Lost Island, Kochs Ridge and other cheniers branching off of Front Ridge are regarded as being regressive coastal spits.

== Culture ==
The town of Pecan island is inhabited largely by persons of Cajun ancestry, and has a Catholic Mission church, Sacred Heart, a Baptist church and a Methodist church. Since Hurricane Rita occurred only one store exists, which sells fuel, groceries and hunting supplies. Common family names in the area include Veazey, Bourque, Stelly, Guidry, Choate, Winch, Broussard, Morgan, Dyson, White, Lege, Harrington, Lee, and Miller. The town had been previously ravaged by Hurricane Audrey in 1957.

Pecan Island, Louisiana, 2005 NAIP Aerial Imagery Mosaic with Shaded Relief Base

Pecan Island is part of the Abbeville Micropolitan Statistical Area

In August 2026, plans were announced by SpaceX to construct a 125,000-acre (510 km^{2}) launch site for its Starship rocket near the community on land previously owned by Exxon at a cost of around $100 billion.

== Hurricane Rita ==
Most residents evacuated under the threat of Hurricane Rita, which obliterated most of the homes there and forced the closure of the community's school - Pecan Island High School. As with most Gulf coastal towns, future growth will be regulated by FEMA construction guidelines following the 2005 hurricanes, meaning new homes will be somewhat more expensive to construct, due to the increased elevation requirement.

Map of Marsh Types within the Pecan island, Louisiana, Area. Light green is fresh marsh; dark green is intermediate marsh; yellow and brown are upper and lower cheniers, and blue is open water.

== Local events ==
Pecan Island has a Mardi Gras and is bustling with duck hunters in the winter months.

== Morgan effigy ==
A carved deer antler figurine known as the "Morgan Effigy" was found in fill dirt taken from the nearby Morgan Mounds site. The location, a pre-Columbian Coastal Coles Creek culture archaeological site, was occupied between 700 and 1000 AD. The artistic stylization of the small sculpture shows it may have been a human death figure. The presence of bones in the same fill dirt means it was interred as a grave good, possibly with a prominent member of the community. It is the only known Coles Creek culture artwork to be found that is not made from ceramic.

Not only is Pecan island unique in the occurrence of the Morgan effigy, but the small chenier complex that it lies upon is also unique among the cheniers of the Louisiana Chenier Plain for the diversity and complexity of prehistoric cultural deposits. It almost contains 60% of the Native American mounds reported from the Louisiana Chenier Plain. Its local Native American mounds are also organized in more complex arrangements than found elsewhere in the Louisiana Chenier Plain. Finally, of the entire Louisiana Chenier Plain, Pecan island contains the only known prehistoric cemeteries for the area's early Copell and Veazey occupations; the only known mounds dating to the Marksville period; and the area's largest, most complex Coles Creek mound site. The reason that Pecan island was the locus of so much prehistoric activity is unknown.
