= National Register of Historic Places listings in Livingston Parish, Louisiana =

Location of Livingston Parish in Louisiana

This is a list of the National Register of Historic Places listings in Livingston Parish, Louisiana.

This is intended to be a complete list of the properties on the National Register of Historic Places in Livingston Parish, Louisiana, United States. The locations of National Register properties for which the latitude and longitude coordinates are included below, may be seen in a map.

There are 16 properties listed on the National Register in the parish.

This National Park Service list is complete through NPS recent listings posted June 19, 2026.

== Current listings ==
	Name on the Register	Image	Date listed	Location	City or town	Description
1	Brown Hotel and Cafe	Brown Hotel and Cafe	October 6, 2015 (#15000695)	114 North Range Avenue; 30°29′06″N 90°57′21″W	Denham Springs	
2	Maurice Cannon and Alice Redmond Kemp, Jr. House		June 24, 2026 (#100013166)	28315 Hwy 444; 30°21′44″N 90°36′51″W	Killian vicinity	
3	Carter Plantation	Carter Plantation	February 23, 1979 (#79001069)	30325 Carter Cemetery Road; 30°24′51″N 90°34′39″W	Springfield vicinity	Built c. 1820 for free man of color Thomas Freeman. During the Civil War, a minor Confederate naval operation was launched here.
4	Castleberry Boarding House	Castleberry Boarding House	June 12, 2001 (#01000624)	18290 Cooper Street; 30°19′57″N 90°51′00″W	Port Vincent	
5	Decareaux House	Decareaux House	May 14, 1992 (#92000507)	16021 LA 16; 30°17′55″N 90°47′56″W	French Settlement	Also known as the Creole House Museum
6	Denham Springs City Hall	Denham Springs City Hall	April 16, 1993 (#93000304)	115 Mattie Street; 30°29′08″N 90°57′24″W	Denham Springs	
7	Denham Springs Commercial Historic District		November 5, 2018 (#100003075)	100-239 N Range Ave. 30°29′07″N 90°57′22″W	Denham Springs	
8	Deslattes House	Deslattes House	November 13, 2003 (#03001139)	15620 LA 16; 30°17′38″N 90°47′40″W	French Settlement	
9	Guitreau House		May 14, 1992 (#92000508)	16825 LA 16; 30°19′18″N 90°48′37″W	French Settlement	
10	Hungarian Settlement School	Hungarian Settlement School	August 2, 2001 (#01000805)	27455 LA 43; 30°28′04″N 90°34′40″W	Albany vicinity	
11	Adam Lobell House	Adam Lobell House	May 14, 1992 (#92000509)	15715 LA 16; 30°17′40″N 90°47′45″W	French Settlement	
12	Macedonia Baptist Church	Macedonia Baptist Church	June 6, 1980 (#80001738)	Along LA 1036, about 7.4 miles (11.9 km) north of Holden; 30°36′10″N 90°42′59″W	Holden vicinity	Organized in 1856, the present vernacular-style building dates from 1898.
13	Old Livingston Parish Courthouse	Old Livingston Parish Courthouse	August 7, 1989 (#89001040)	32283 2nd Street; 30°25′42″N 90°32′45″W	Springfield	Springfield was the seat of the Parish from 1835 to 1872.
14	St. Margaret Catholic Church	St. Margaret Catholic Church	January 28, 1992 (#91002025)	30300 Catholic Hall Road; 30°28′26″N 90°34′49″W	Albany vicinity	
15	Luther V. and Josie N. Settoon House	Luther V. and Josie N. Settoon House	September 27, 2022 (#100008254)	32210 2nd St. 30°25′44″N 90°32′47″W	Springfield	
16	Walker High School	Walker High School	March 3, 2000 (#00000159)	13443 Burgess Avenue; 30°29′23″N 90°51′48″W	Walker	

== See also ==
- List of National Historic Landmarks in Louisiana
- National Register of Historic Places listings in Louisiana
