= Lobell (disambiguation) =

Lobell is a surname.

Lobell may also refer to:

- Adam Lobell House, a historic building in French Settlement, Louisiana
- Mack Lobell (1984–2016), a racehorse
