= Hungarian Settlement School =

- U.S. National Register of Historic Places

- Location within Louisiana Location within the United States
- Location: 27455 LA 43, Albany, Louisiana
- Coordinates: 30°28′04″N 90°34′40″W
- Area: 2 acres (0.81 ha)
- Built: c.1910
- NRHP reference No.: 01000805
- Added to NRHP: August 2, 2001

The Hungarian Settlement School, now home to the Hungarian Settlement Museum, is a historic school building located at 27455 Louisiana Highway 43 in Albany, Louisiana, United States.

Originally built in Springfield in c.1910, the structure was moved in 1928 to the nearby Hungarian Settlement where it served as the principal school until its closure in 1943. After sitting abandoned for some years, the Hungarian Settlement Historical Society obtained a long-term lease on the property in 2000 and began a complete restoration of the building for the purpose of turning it into a museum.

The building was listed on the National Register of Historic Places on August 2, 2001. The Hungarian Settlement Museum opened on September 27, 2017.

== See also ==
- National Register of Historic Places listings in Livingston Parish, Louisiana
