= Mattie Liptak =

American actor (born 1996)

- Born: Matthew Alan Liptak; April 10, 1996 (age 30); Walker, Louisiana, U.S.
- Occupation: Actor
- Years active: 2010–present

Mattie Liptak (born April 10, 1996) is an American actor best known for his role as George in the horror film, Quarantine 2: Terminal, a sequel to the 2008 film, Quarantine.

== Personal life ==
Mattie Liptak was born and raised in Walker, Louisiana to Brenda Tedder and Robert Liptak. He graduated from Walker High School in May 2014.

== Filmography ==
Year	Title	Role	Notes
2010	The Candy Shop	Jimmy	Short
2011	Quarantine 2: Terminal	George	
2012	Ghoul	Steve	TV movie
2012	The Odd Life of Timothy Green	#8	
2013	Shadow People	Preston Camfield	Direct-to-video
2015	Trumbo	Chris Trumbo	
2016	USS Indianapolis: Men of Courage	Paul	

== Television ==
Year	Title	Role	Episode
2011	Treme	Student #1	Slip Away
2016	Outcast	Young Donnie	
