= Killian, Louisiana =

Town of Killian
- Town
- Location of Killian in Livingston Parish, Louisiana.

- Location of Louisiana in the United States
- Coordinates: 30°22′02″N 90°33′59″W
- Country: United States
- State: Louisiana
- Parish: Livingston

Government
  - Mayor: Ronald Sharp Sr.

Area
  - Total: 10.90 sq mi (28.23 km^{2})
  - Land: 10.88 sq mi (28.18 km^{2})
  - Water: 0.019 sq mi (0.05 km^{2})
- Elevation: 13 ft (4.0 m)

Population (2020)
  - Total: 1,177
  - Density: 108.2/sq mi (41.76/km^{2})
- Time zone: UTC-6 (CST)
  - Summer (DST): UTC-5 (CDT)
- Area code: 225
- FIPS code: 22-39685
- Website: killianla.municipalimpact.com

Killian is a town in Livingston Parish, Louisiana, United States. As of the 2020 census, Killian had a population of 1,177. It is part of the Baton Rouge Metropolitan Statistical Area.

== Geography ==
Killian is located at 30°22′2″N 90°33′59″W (30.367113, -90.566390).

According to the United States Census Bureau, the village has a total area of 11.1 square miles (29 km^{2}), of which 11.1 square miles (29 km^{2}) is land and 0.04 square miles (0.10 km^{2}) (0.18%) is water.

== Demographics ==
Historical population
Census	Pop.	Note	%±
1970	293		—
1980	611		108.5%
1990	721		18.0%
2000	1,053		46.0%
2010	1,206		14.5%
2020	1,177		−2.4%
2025 (est.)	1,260	▲	7.1%
U.S. Decennial Census

As of the census of 2000, there were 1,053 people, 407 households, and 310 families residing in the village. The population density was 95.0 inhabitants per square mile (36.7/km^{2}). There were 590 housing units at an average density of 53.2 per square mile (20.5/km^{2}). The racial makeup of the village was 81.48% White, 17.09% African American, 0.09% Native American, 0.47% from other races, and 0.85% from two or more races. Hispanic or Latino of any race were 0.85% of the population.

There were 407 households, out of which 30.2% had children under the age of 18 living with them, 66.3% were married couples living together, 6.1% had a female householder with no husband present, and 23.8% were non-families. 19.4% of all households were made up of individuals, and 5.9% had someone living alone who was 65 years of age or older. The average household size was 2.59 and the average family size was 2.95.

In the village, the population was spread out, with 23.6% under the age of 18, 7.9% from 18 to 24, 26.9% from 25 to 44, 29.5% from 45 to 64, and 12.1% who were 65 years of age or older. The median age was 39 years. For every 100 females, there were 104.9 males. For every 100 females age 18 and over, there were 101.0 males.

The median income for a household in the village was $40,781, and the median income for a family was $42,885. Men had a median income of $41,058 versus $25,833 for women. The per capita income for the village was $19,648. About 7.3% of families and 10.2% of the population were below the poverty line, including 12.8% of those under age 18 and 10.2% of those age 65 or over.

== Education ==
Killian is within the Livingston Parish Public Schools system. The local government of Killian has yet to build a school of its own. Instead, the students in the area attend nearby Springfield Elementary, Middle, and High Schools.
