= Carter Plantation =

Historic house in Louisiana, United States

- U.S. National Register of Historic Places
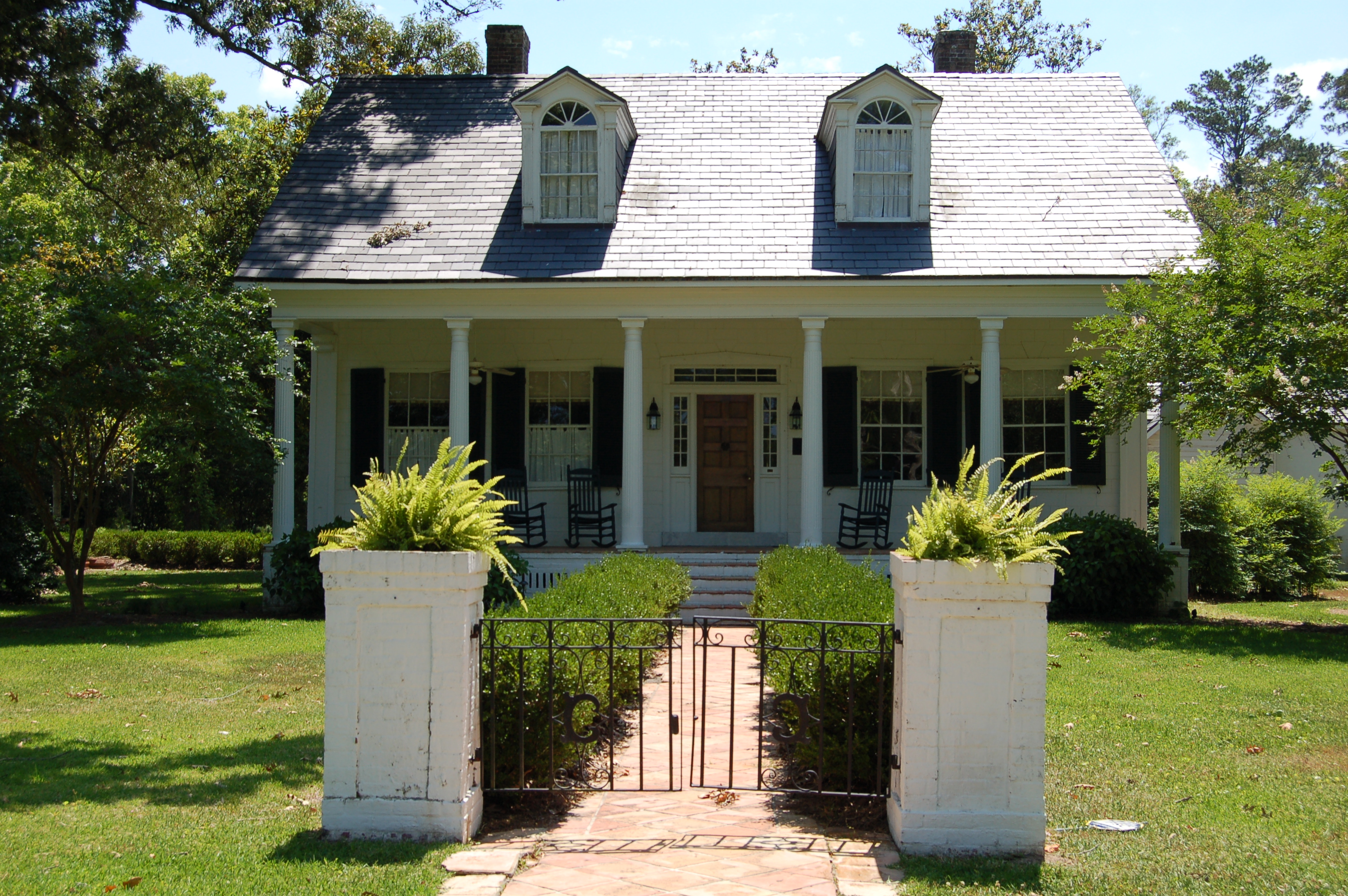

- Location within Louisiana Location within the United States
- Location: 30325 Carter Cemetery Road, Springfield, Louisiana
- Coordinates: 30°24′51″N 90°34′39″W
- Area: 8.5 acres (3.4 ha)
- Built: c.1820
- Built by: Thomas Freeman
- Architectural style: Greek Revival, Federal
- Website: www.thevillasatcarterplantation.com
- NRHP reference No.: 79001069
- Added to NRHP: February 23, 1979

The Carter Plantation, also known as the Carter House, is an historic plantation house located at 30325 Carter Cemetery Road, southwest of Springfield in what is now Livingston Parish, Louisiana, United States.

The property was purchased by Thomas Freeman in 1817, from James Rheem, who acquired it from a Spanish land grant in 1804. Freeman, a free person of color, who was a slave owner and the first African American to own property in the Greensburg District (St. Helena Parish), the southern portion of which became Livingston Parish.

The home was listed on the National Register of Historic Places on February 23, 1979.

== Early history ==
The land of the plantation was originally part of West Florida, which from 1763 to 1810 was under British and then Spanish control.

Livingston Parish was created February 10, 1832, when St. Helena Parish was divided. There is some controversy as to whether the Parish was named after Edward Livingston or Robert R. Livingston, although the name is generally attributed to the former.

== Plantation history ==
=== Overview ===
Thomas Freeman bought the land from Rheem and from 1817 to 1820, built the Federal style raised plantation house and lived there until 1838. State Representative of Livingston Parish, W. L. Breed, bought the house and lived there five years, until his 1843 death while serving as the first sheriff of Livingston Parish.

George Richardson bought the plantation and lived there until his death in 1858. His descendants with the surname Carter (hence the plantation's name) lived there after that.

=== Historical summary ===
"The Carter Plantation historically included around 2,000 acres. It has a unique history which involves the ownership of the plantation by Thomas Freeman, the first free man of color to own property in Livingston Parish. He and his enslaved laborers managed the land and planted crops. The ownership changed over the years, but the property continued to operate as a plantation until the Civil War. The plantation's cypress swamp was a major timber source for the surrounding area. The timber harvesting was the plantation's main source of income and the Blood River was the main source of transportation and access to the site. Historically the river was used to transport the timber mainly south to New Orleans. The journey by boat to New Orleans used to take 2-3 days. With the arrival of the railroads, the river became less important for transport, and the plantation began to slowly lose business. There were two school houses on the site. One of the school houses was used to educate the owner’s children and cousins, and the other was a separate school house hidden in the woods for the slave children to secretly learn. The main land entry to the site was via the road that approached from the east. Crops grown on the site included many common southern fruits and vegetables including mainly corn; however the typical southern cotton crop was never grown on the site."

In March 1865, late in the Civil War, the plantation hosted a small Confederate naval squadron which launched a successful expedition against a Union Navy-protected contraband operation on the lower Amite River. The leader of the Mobile-based force, Lt. Edward J. McDermott, and a local man who served as a guide, Louis Bernard, were killed in the battle and their bodies brought back for burial at the Springfield Cemetery.

== Today ==
The Carter Plantation house is currently the real estate center for "The Villas and the Carter Plantation Golf Resort".

There is a large cemetery on the property.

== See also ==
- National Register of Historic Places listings in Livingston Parish, Louisiana
