= Old Livingston Parish Courthouse =

Historic courthouse in Louisiana, US

- U.S. National Register of Historic Places
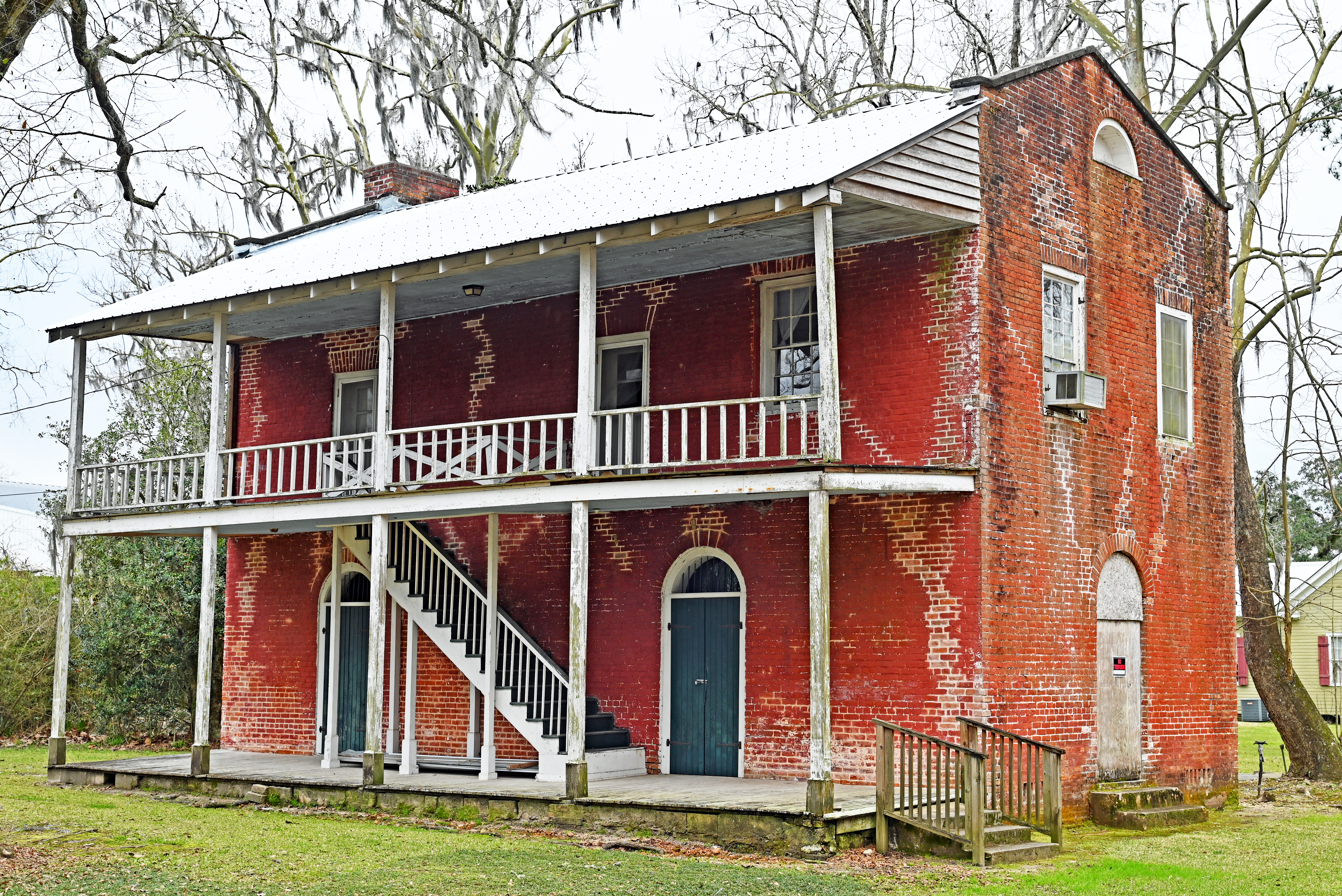

- Location within Louisiana Location within the United States
- Interactive map showing the location of Old Livingston Parish Courthouse
- Location: 32283 2nd Street, Springfield, Louisiana
- Coordinates: 30°25′42″N 90°32′45″W
- Area: Less than one acre
- Built: 1835
- Architectural style: Federal
- NRHP reference No.: 89001040
- Added to NRHP: August 7, 1989

The Old Livingston Parish Courthouse is a historic institutional building located at 32283 2nd Street in Springfield, Louisiana.

Built in 1835, the old courthouse is a two-story brick structure in Federal style. The building was originally a bank owned by the New Orleans Gas Light and Banking Company. When the bank failed in 1843, the building was acquired by the parish, and served as the parish courthouse until 1872, when the parish seat was moved to Port Vincent. The building was subsequently used as a voting precinct until it was purchased by J.S. Settoon family, which used it to host as a grocery store until 1920. After that time the building has been rented as a meeting place and used as a residence.

The building was listed on the National Register of Historic Places on August 7, 1989.

== See also ==
- National Register of Historic Places listings in Livingston Parish, Louisiana
