= Albany High School (Louisiana) =

Coordinates: 30.498796°N 90.586878°W

Location
- 29710 Mulberry St; Albany, Louisiana 70711; United States

Information
- Established: 1924
- School district: Livingston Parish Public Schools
- Principal: Sammie Lacara (August 2022)
- Staff: 35.73 (FTE)
- Key people: John Leitz IV (School Counselor)
- Grades: 9th through 12th
- Enrollment: 604 (2023-2024)
- Student to teacher ratio: 16.90
- Colors: Maroon and white
- Mascot: Hornet
- Feeder schools: Albany Middle School (Louisiana)
- Website: www.albanyhs.com

Albany High School is located in Albany, Louisiana, United States. Albany High School is a part of the Livingston Parish Public Schools system and serves grades 9 through 12. The school has around 600 students (Fall 2018). The principal is Sammie Lacara.

The school mascot is the Hornet and the school colors are Maroon and White.

== School uniform ==
Albany High School, like all schools in the Livingston Parish Public Schools, has mandatory school uniforms. Students are required to wear polos or oxford shirts that are colored white or navy blue. Students are required to wear khaki bottoms. Students are also required to tuck in shirts. The belts do not have to be a specific color, but must be appropriate (no spikes or big cowboy plate in the front). Students have the option to wear socks. If worn, the pair must match.

== Feeder patterns ==
Albany Lower Elementary School (Louisiana), Albany Upper Elementary School (Louisiana), and Albany Middle School (Louisiana) feed into Albany High School.

== Extra Curricular Activities ==
BETA, Student Government (SGA), FCS, SADD club, Band, Yearbook club, 4-H, Cheer, Flag, and Robotic.

== Athletics ==
Albany High athletics competes in the LHSAA.

The school's athletic teams include football, baseball, softball, basketball, track and field, and cross country.
