= Walker High School (Walker, Louisiana) =

Location
- 12646 Burgess Ave; Walker, Louisiana 70785; United States; 30°29′21″N 90°52′38″W

Information
- Type: Public
- Established: 1921
- School district: Livingston Parish Public Schools
- NCES District ID: 2201020
- CEEB code: 192945
- NCES School ID: 220102000774
- Principal: Timothy Rogers
- Teaching staff: 120.00 (on an FTE basis)
- Grades: 9-12
- Enrollment: 2,134 (2023-2024)
- Student to teacher ratio: 17.78
- Colors: Green, White, & Gold
- Mascot: Wildcat
- Nickname: Wildcats
- Website: www.walkerhigh.org

Walker High School is a public high school located in Walker, Louisiana, United States. Walker High School is part of the Livingston Parish Public Schools system, and was founded in 1921 as a community school for the residents of Walker, a city located in Livingston Parish. The school is currently located off of Burgess Ave. The high school moved to its current campus in the 1970s leaving behind its old campus that is on the National Register of Historic Places. The old campus was converted to Walker Freshmen High School then again, in 2021 to Walker Junior High.

Walker High School is a public high school and has open enrollment. Walker High School offers a wide variety of educational programs for its students to pursue with many career-technical and college-preparatory courses offered.

Walker High School is a member of the Louisiana High School Athletic Association and offers a wide variety of sports and programs. Extracurricular activities are also offered in the form of performing arts, school publications, and clubs.

== History ==
Walker High School was founded and approved by the State in 1921 although it is believed that the first graduation took place in 1917. Walker High School was an attempt to provide quality education for the children of Walker who were too poor to provide money for education and who were only able to attend school in areas that were isolated and primitive.

By the late 1920s interest in public education grew in Walker and the surrounding areas, so the school district proposed the sale of bonds to finance the construction of a new school. After initially failing in April 1928, the district expanded and in August 1928 the proposal passed with 73 in favor and 65 against. Construction on the school was completed by 1930. The school was a two-story brick building with concrete trim that featured Italian Renaissance and Italian Baroque motifs. When the school opened in January 1931, it was realized that money for educational equipment was lacking, so the voters in the district passed another measure leading to an additional property tax. This consistent effort by the citizens showed their desire for a proper education system, and allowed for the older rural schools to close and the schools consolidated their students to one location.

Livingston Parish Public Schools desegregated following the 1969 case Dunn v. Livingston Parish School Board. The effects of desegregation were larger for Denham Springs High School because Denham Springs was the largest city in the parish. Prior to desegregating, Livingston Parish only had one school for African Americans called West Livingston. As a result, black students were bussed from all over the parish to attend school. Because there was a large Ku Klux Klan presence in Livingston Parish, there was not a large African American population outside of the City of Denham Springs. Those who did attend Walker High School following integration likely faced harsh treatment from their peers.

By 1975, the City of Walker outgrew the building that was once Walker High School and moved to its current location. The building that was once Walker High School was converted into a junior high and now serves as Walker Junior High School. It was also placed on the National Register of Historic Places on March 3, 2000.

In 2023, the school received national attention when Principal Jason St. Pierre punished a 17-year-old honor student for a 15-second video of her dancing at an off-campus weekend party funded by the student body, telling the student's mother that the student was not “living in the Lord’s way." He removed her from her role as president of the student government and rescinded his college scholarship recommendations. Following a backlash, he reinstated the student, apologized, and resigned.

== National Register of Historic Places ==
The school was listed on the National Register of Historic Places on March 3, 2000.

Walker High School was originally a two-story brick building with concrete trim that featured Italian Renaissance and Italian Baroque motifs. The structure was designed by New Orleans architect W.R. Burk and construction was awarded to R.L. Roland & Son. Was first constructed to act as city hall. Later the holding cells of the town hall were expanded and remodeled into a small prison after the original prison ran out of housing space this adjust was only as a temporary relief function due to budget cuts in the prison system. Then the building was remodeled yet again to act as a high school.

== Enrollment ==
Walker High School is a public high school with no admissions requirements. Enrollments is open to residents of Livingston Parish that make up the Walker community. Walker High School had 1228 students for the 2016–2017 school year. The demographics were 1058 (86%) White, 121 (10%) African American, 32 (3%) Hispanic, 12 (0.1%) Asian, 4 (0.3%) Two or More Races, 1 (0.1%) Native Hawaiians/Pacific Islander. The school also has a 53:47 male to female ratio.

== Academics ==
Walker High School features a technical-education curriculum and a college-preparatory curriculum with the option to partake in Advanced Placement (AP) Program. Students in the technical-education curriculum are required to complete a minimum of 23 academic units that include 4 in English, 4 in mathematics, 2 in science, 2 in social science, 1.5 in physical education, .5 in health, and 9 in their technical pathway. Students in the college-preparatory curriculum are required to complete a minimum of 24 academic units that include 4 in English, 2 in foreign language, 4 in mathematics, 4 in science, 4 in social science, 3 in electives, 1.5 in physical education, .5 in health, and 1 in the arts.

The technical-education pathway requires students to travel to the Livingston Parish Literacy and Technical Center in Walker, Louisiana, and is shared by all of the high schools in Livingston Parish. This Center in a separate campus from the rest of Walker High School. As of 2019, Walker High School offers 16 AP courses for students to earn college credit. Spanish and French are both offered to fulfill the foreign language requirements. Students may also enroll concurrently at Southeastern Louisiana University.

Walker High School also offers extensive Business and STEM for students to participate in. Walker High is the only high school in Livingston Parish to offer a principles of engineering and robotics courses for students to earn credit in. These courses provide students with the opportunity to learn more about careers in engineering and technology in addition with the opportunity to compete in a competition hosted by the Marine Advanced Technology Education Center. Walker allowed Papa John's, Neighbors Federal Credit Union, Nike Apparel, and a Walk-On's Conference Center to all open a location on the school's campus. These shops allow students to work during the school day while being exposed to culinary, finance, and business management while also obtaining high school credit.

For the 2017–2018 school year, Walker High School earned a B grade under the Louisiana Department of Education more rigorous grading system with a School Performance Score (SPS) of 81.9. The school has a mean ACT score of 19.5. Furthermore, the school has a 79% graduation rate and 51% of its graduates go on to enroll in college.

== Athletics ==
Walker High athletics competes in the LHSAA.

State Championships

- Basketball
  - 2018 Boys Basketball
- Track
  - 2014 Boys Pole Vault, Kyle Baudoin

== Notable alumni ==
- Mike DeJean, Major League Baseball, player
- Chris Hawkins, former LSU football player, former NFL player
- Mattie Liptak, actor
- Brian Thomas Jr., college football wide receiver for the LSU Tigers; selected by Jacksonville Jaguars 2024 NFL Draft

== See also ==
- National Register of Historic Places listings in Livingston Parish, Louisiana
