= Macedonia Baptist Church (Holden, Louisiana) =

Historic church in Louisiana, United States

- U.S. National Register of Historic Places
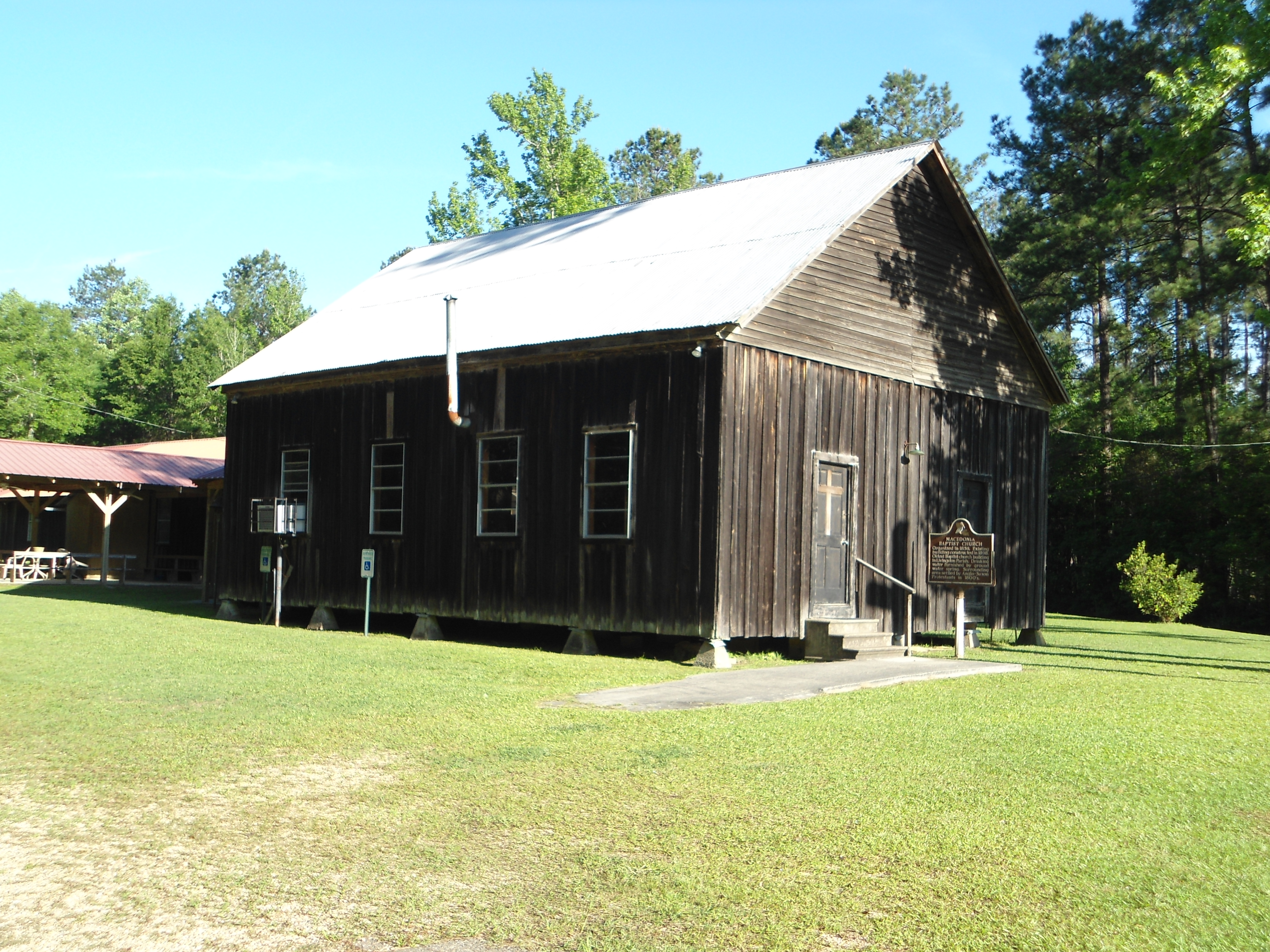

- Location within Louisiana Location within the United States
- Location: Along LA 1036, about 7.4 miles (11.9 km) north of Holden
- Nearest city: Holden, Louisiana
- Coordinates: 30°36′10″N 90°42′59″W
- Area: 0.9 acres (0.36 ha)
- Built: 1898
- NRHP reference No.: 80001738
- Added to NRHP: June 6, 1980

The Macedonia Baptist Church is a historic church located along LA 1036, about 7.4 miles (11.9 km) north of Holden, Louisiana.

The church was organized in 1856, and the current building was constructed in 1898. The local community was settled by Anglo-Saxon Protestants during the 19th century.

The building was listed on the National Register of Historic Places on June 6, 1980.

== See also ==
- National Register of Historic Places listings in Livingston Parish, Louisiana
