= Matthew Arnold (director) =

American film director

- Born: April 8, 1974 (age 52)
- Education: Woodbridge High School; Centre College (BS); USC (MFA)
- Occupations: Film director, television director, showrunner, writer, producer and graphic novelist

Matthew Arnold (born April 8, 1974) is an American film and television writer, director and producer. He made his feature film directorial debut in 2013 with Shadow People. The film was purchased at the 2012 Cannes Film Festival by Anchor Bay.

He is the creator, director, and an executive producer for the 2014 primetime NBC TV series Siberia. Siberia is notable for being the first completely independently financed series to air on major network. The show was well rated, getting 91% viewer approval on RottenTomatoes.

Arnold is also the creator and executive producer of the NBC series Emerald City, a dark re-imagining of The Wizard Of Oz.

In 2020, during the pandemic, Arnold wrote the graphic novel, "Eden", published by Comixology and Dark Horse Comics, released in print July 12, 2022.

In 2021, Netflix purchased Arnold's original series idea, Revenge Inc., currently in development. Arnold will write, executive produce and showrun.

In 2023, NBC purchased Arnold's original series idea, Nowhere, based on his short story of the same name. Arnold will write, executive produce and showrun. Producers for the series are James Wan's Atomic Monster and Roy Lee's Vertigo Entertainment

Arnold is a graduate of Centre College in Kentucky where he majored in Physics and Philosophical Metaphysics. He also has an MFA in film production from The University of Southern California, USC School of Cinematic Arts.
