= Deslattes House =

Historic house in Louisiana, United States

- U.S. National Register of Historic Places
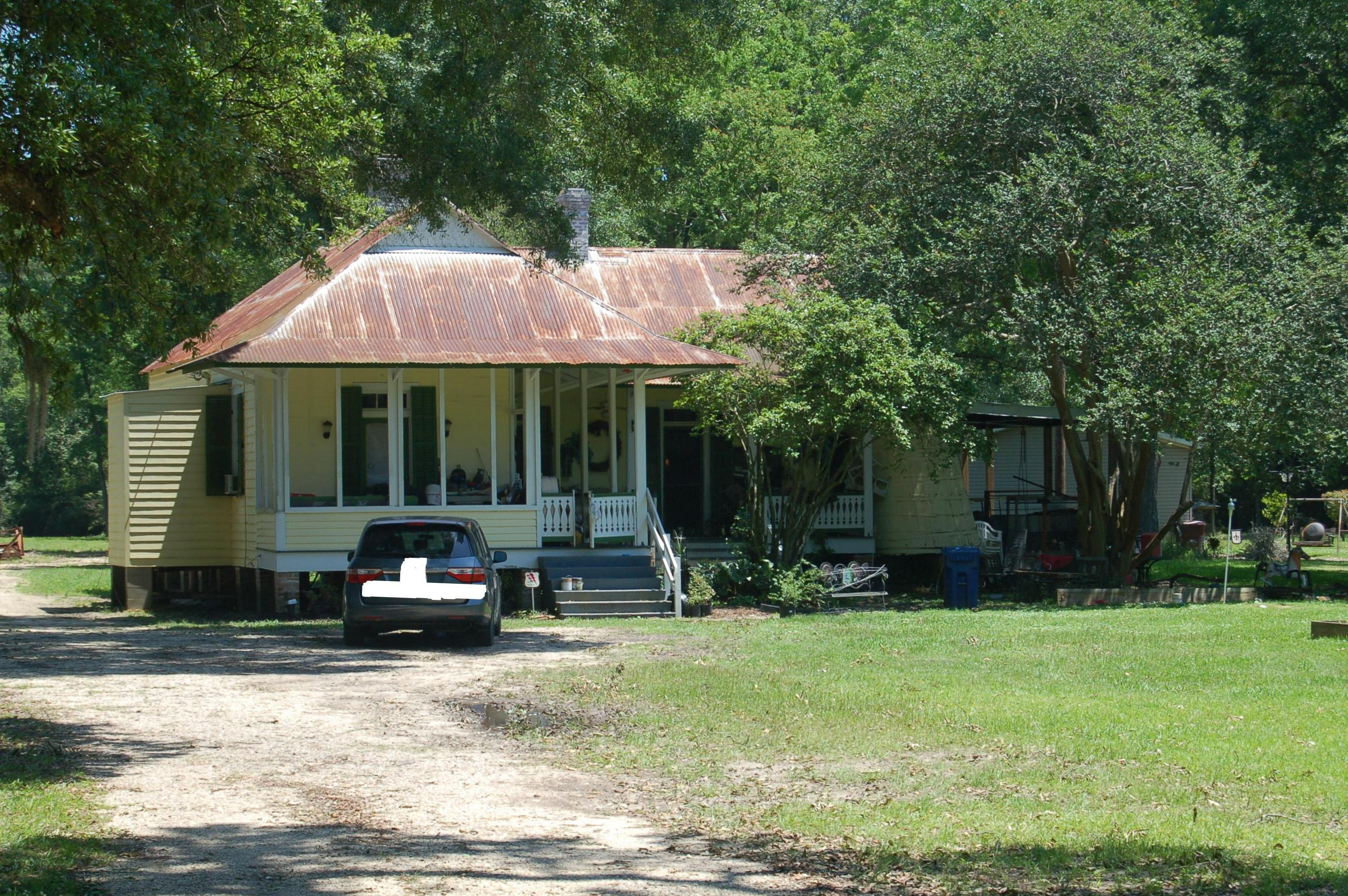

- Location within Louisiana Location within the United States
- Location: 15620 LA 16, French Settlement, Louisiana
- Coordinates: 30°17′38″N 90°47′40″W
- Area: 2 acres (0.81 ha)
- Built: c.1900
- Architectural style: Italianate
- NRHP reference No.: 03001139
- Added to NRHP: November 13, 2003

The Deslattes House is a historic house located at 15620 Louisiana Highway 16 in French Settlement, Louisiana, United States.

Built in c.1900, the house is an L-shaped one story frame dwelling in Italianate style with a gallery running from the front to the rear of the house. A large barrel cistern made of cypress staves is located on a brick base near the house and is considered a contributing property. The parcel of land on which the house is actually standing was purchased in 1900 by Florian Deslattes, which sold the property along with buildings and improvements in 1903 to Mary LeBourgeois. The house has been also known locally as the Brignac House after Anita Brignac, who lived in the building for many years since 1940.

The house was listed on the National Register of Historic Places on November 13, 2003.

== See also ==
- National Register of Historic Places listings in Livingston Parish, Louisiana
