= St. Margaret Catholic Church (Albany, Louisiana) =

Historic church in Louisiana, United States

- U.S. National Register of Historic Places
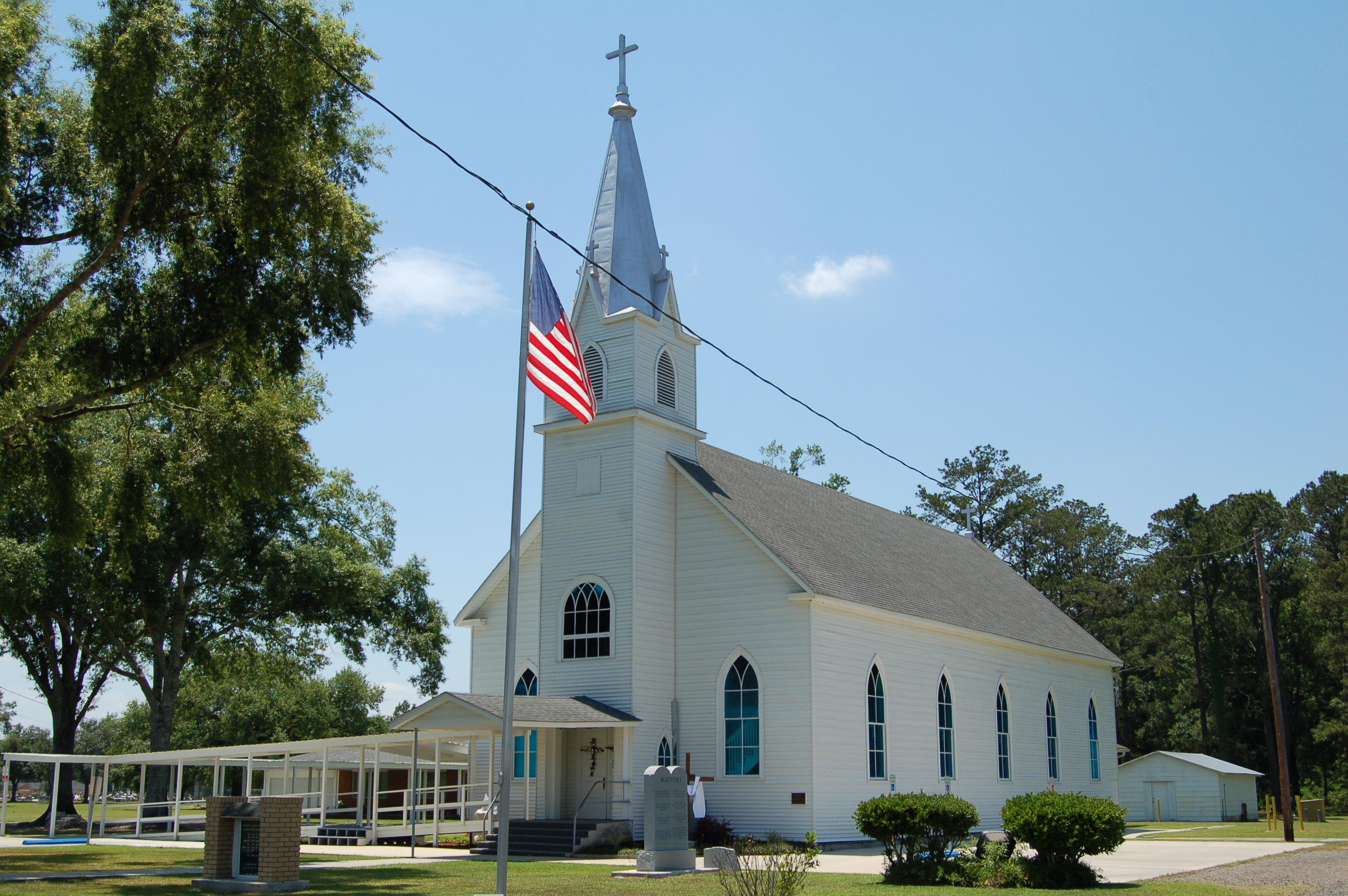

- Location within Louisiana Location within the United States
- Location: 30300 Catholic Hall Road, Albany, Louisiana
- Coordinates: 30°28′26″N 90°34′49″W
- Area: less than one acre
- Built: 1910
- Architectural style: Gothic Revival
- NRHP reference No.: 91002025
- Added to NRHP: January 28, 1992

St. Margaret Queen of Scotland Catholic Church is a parish of the Roman Catholic Church serving eastern Livingston Parish, Louisiana. It is particularly noted for its historic parish church located at 30300 Catholic Hall Road near Albany, Louisiana. Consecrated in 1912, it represented, along with the Hungarian Presbyterian Church, the center of community activities in Albany, Louisiana.

== Architecture ==
Built in 1910, the church is a frame Gothic Revival building featuring a basilican plan with a central entrance tower surmounted by a belfry and a spire. A certain number of alterations have occurred during the years, like the exterior being completely sheathed in aluminium siding and the addition of a small rear wing. It was listed on the National Register of Historic Places on January 28, 1992.

== See also ==
- National Register of Historic Places listings in Livingston Parish, Louisiana
