= St. John's University (Springfield, Louisiana) =

University in Springfield, Louisiana

St. John's University, School of Practical Theology was a school licensed by the State of Louisiana, formerly located in Springfield, Louisiana, It was founded by E. Arthur Winkler, a minister of the United Methodist and Disciples of Christ denominations and state licensed clinical psychologist who died in 1998. He held both the ThD & PhD doctorates in Theology & Clinical Psychology, as well as post graduate seminary degrees. He founded an inter-faith church, the Congregational Church of Practical Theology. St. John’s emphasized Judeo-Christian thought, as well as conventional & evidence based holistic modalities in healing. In 2005, the devastation caused by hurricane Katrina forced the university to close.

St. John's reopened in Temecula, California, operating as a distance education institution, now in reduced offerings in clinical hypnosis.

St. John's was accredited as a theological school by the Transnational Christian Accrediting Commission which is recognized by the US Department of Education, though was not regionally accredited. Program offerings included clinical hypnosis, of which Winkler was an authority, holding diplomate (APBB) status in clinical hypnosis from the American Psychological Association.

== History ==
St. John's University was a recognized distance theological school, emphasizing Judeo-Christian values, liberally & progressively defined. Dissertations, theses or projects were required for most graduate degrees. While not choosing to attain regional accreditation, St. John’s was accredited as a progressive Christian theological seminary & ordained ministers in the Congregational Church.

== Publications ==
Several books by Dr. E. Arthur Winkler are listed with St. John's University Publications as their publisher. Titles include Hypnosis and God (1976), The Power of Suggestion with Hypnosis (1989), and Hypnotherapy (1989).
