= Guitreau House =

Historic house in Louisiana, United States

- U.S. National Register of Historic Places
- Location within Louisiana Location within the United States
- Location: 16825 LA 16, French Settlement, Louisiana
- Coordinates: 30°19′18″N 90°48′37″W
- Area: 0.7 acres (0.28 ha)
- Built: c.1911
- Architectural style: French Creole
- NRHP reference No.: 92000508
- Added to NRHP: May 14, 1992

The Guitreau House, also known as Belle Place, is a historic house located at 16825 Louisiana Highway 16 in French Settlement, Louisiana, United States.

Built in c.1911 for Armond LaBougeois, the house is a one-story frame cottage in French Creole style. The building was widely renovated and expanded in after its 1914 sale to A.D. Guitreau. In the 1960s the house was purchased by Cajun chef and humorist Justin Wilson which sold it to Edward and Tana Berteau in 1979.

The house was listed on the National Register of Historic Places on May 14, 1992.

== See also ==
- National Register of Historic Places listings in Livingston Parish, Louisiana
