= Decareaux House =

Historic house in Louisiana, United States

- U.S. National Register of Historic Places
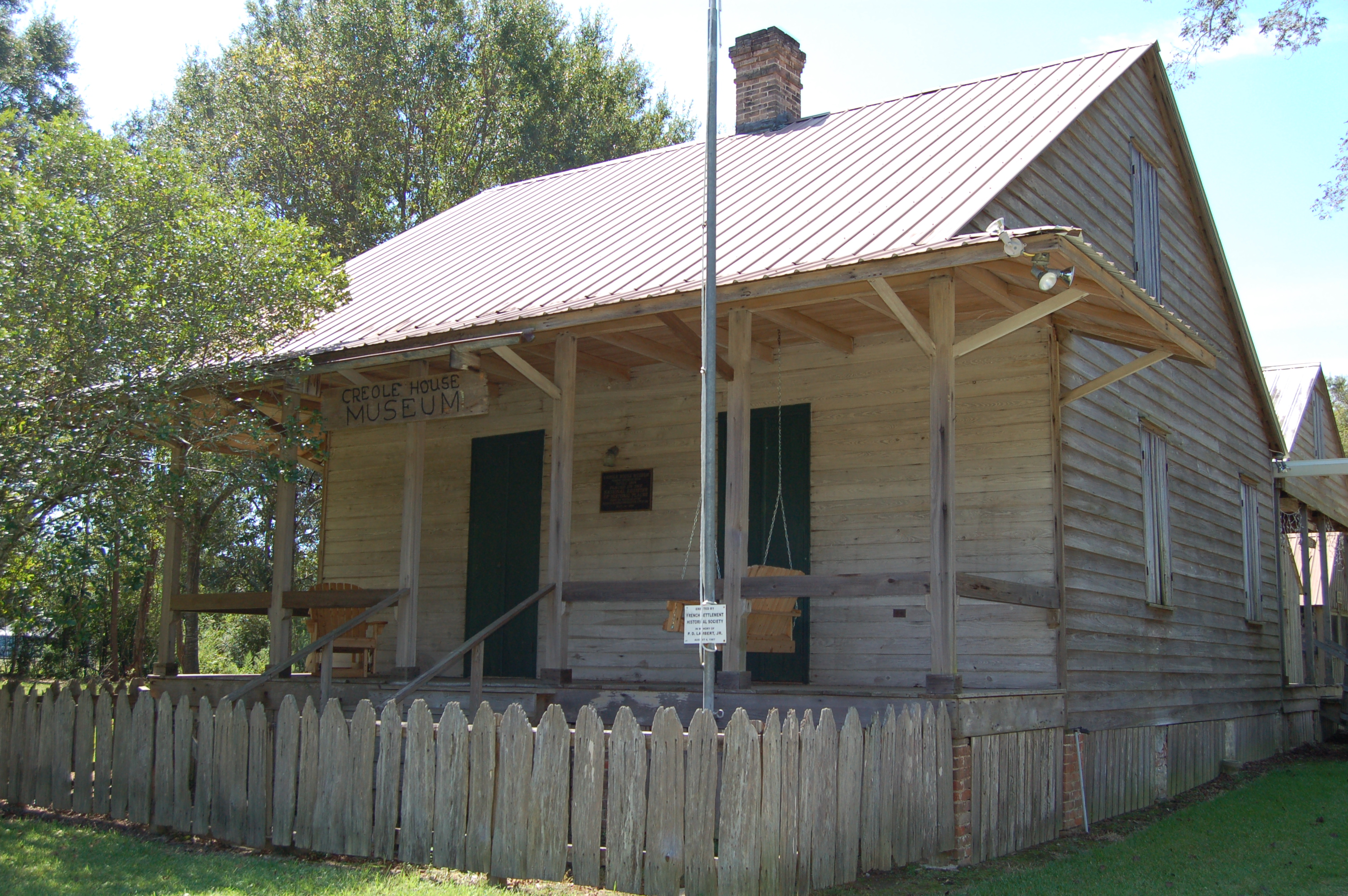

- Location within Louisiana Location within the United States
- Location: 16061 LA 16, French Settlement, Louisiana
- Coordinates: 30°17′55″N 90°47′56″W
- Area: Less than one acre
- Built: c.1898
- Built by: Harris and Alexander Lambert
- Architectural style: French Creole
- NRHP reference No.: 92000507
- Added to NRHP: May 14, 1992

The Decareaux House, also known as the Creole House Museum, is a historic house located at 16061 Louisiana Highway 16 in French Settlement, Louisiana, United States.

Built in c.1898, the house is a one-story frame cottage in French Creole style. It was constructed by Harris and Alexander Lambert as a home for Mr. and Mrs. Alex Decareaux. In 1977 the house was donated to the village of French Settlement, Louisiana, which gave a long-term lease on the building to the French Settlement Historical Society. The house is now hosting the Creole House Museum.

The house was listed on the National Register of Historic Places on May 14, 1992.

== See also ==
- National Register of Historic Places listings in Livingston Parish, Louisiana
