= Castleberry Boarding House =

Historic residential building in Louisiana, United States

- U.S. National Register of Historic Places
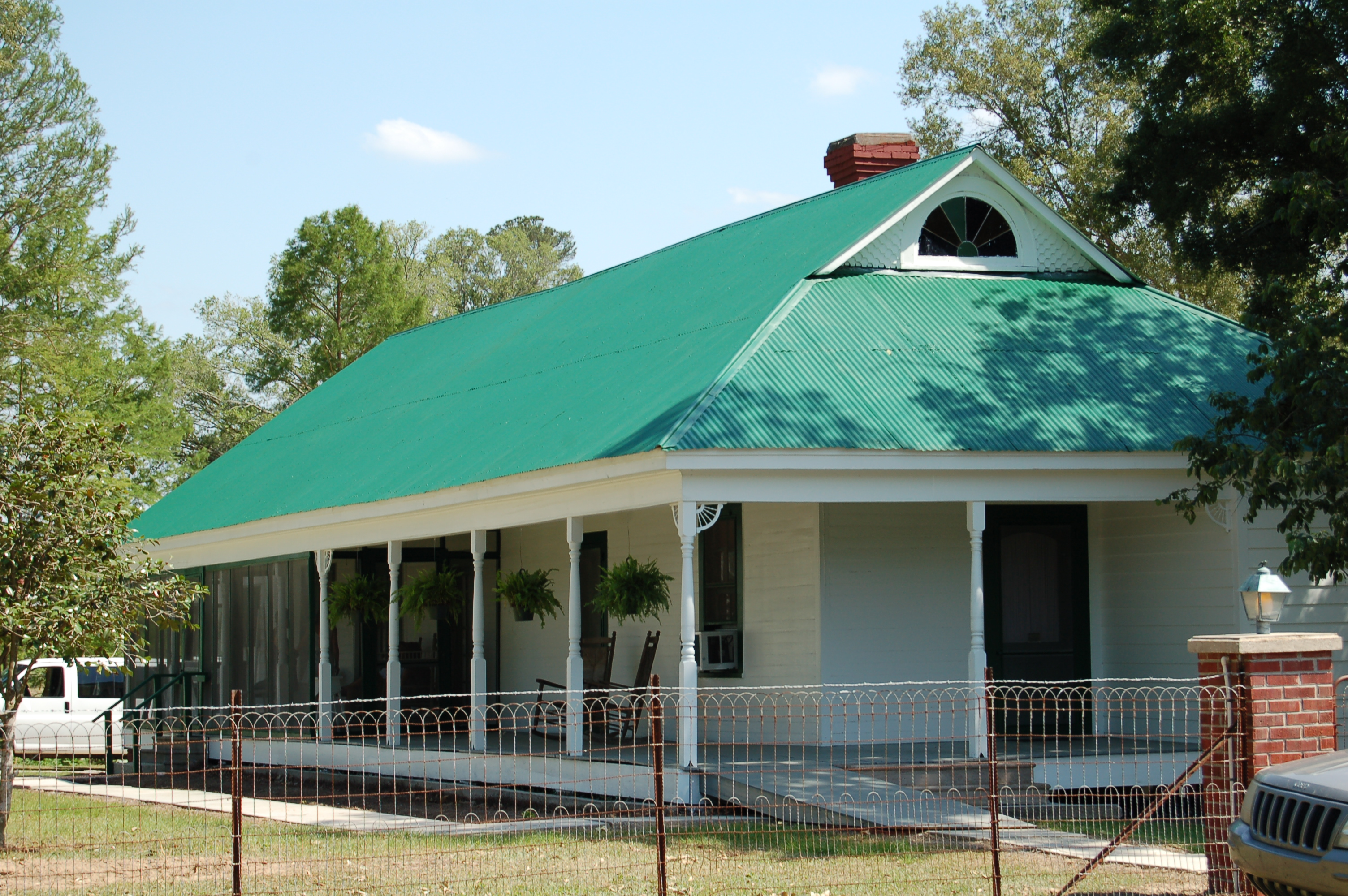
- The building in 2009

- Location within Louisiana Location within the United States
- Location: 18290 Cooper Street, Port Vincent, Louisiana
- Coordinates: 30°19′57″N 90°51′00″W
- Area: 2 acres (0.81 ha)
- Built: c.1900
- Architectural style: Eastlake
- NRHP reference No.: 01000624
- Added to NRHP: June 12, 2001

The Castleberry Boarding House, also known as the Old Livingston Parish Courthouse, is a historical house located at 18290 Cooper Street in Port Vincent, Louisiana, United States.

Originally built in c.1875, the house was expanded and widely remodeled in Eastlake in c.1900. Another major expansion to the rear, with the enclosing of the rear porch, happened in the 1940s when the building became a private property. Three outbuildings, including a carriage house, a kitchen and a privy, are present to the rear of the house and are considered contributing properties. The house had served as a store and briefly as the Livingston Parish courthouse before Andrew Collins purchased it in c.1900 as a gift for Bessie Castleberry. Mrs. Castleberry and her mother remodeled the house adding sleeping rooms for guests and created the boarding house, which operated until 1935 when the house was converted to a private property.

The house was listed on the National Register of Historic Places on June 12, 2001.

== See also ==
- National Register of Historic Places listings in Livingston Parish, Louisiana
