= Julie Cantrell =

21st-century American novelist

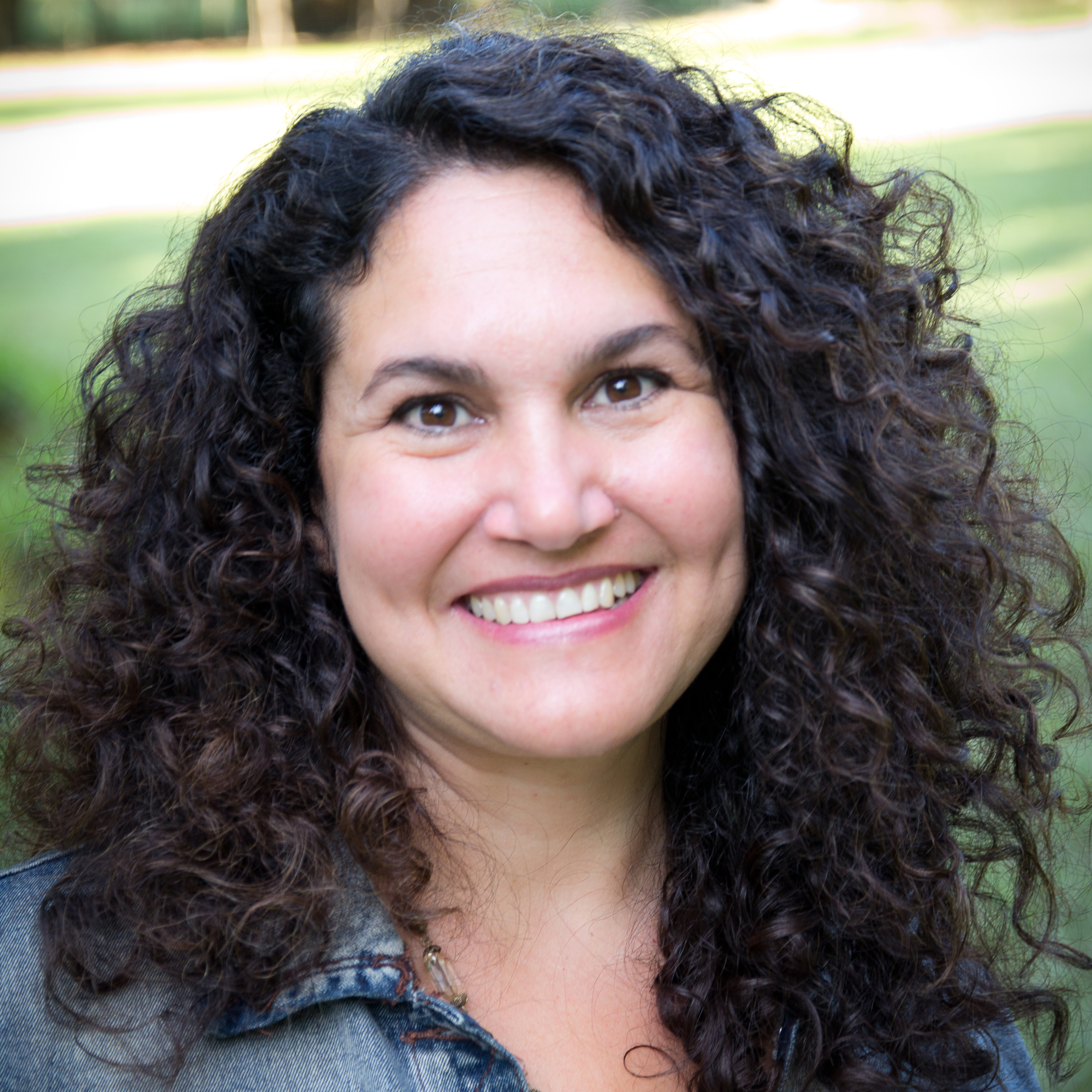
- Born: Julie Perkins; Baton Rouge, Louisiana, U.S.
- Education: Louisiana State University
- Occupations: author; editor; public speaker; creative writing instructor
- Writing career
- Language: English
- Period: 2001-present
- Genres: contemporary fiction; historical fiction; creative nonfiction; children's books
- Notable works: Into the Free, Perennials
- Movement: Women’s issues
- Website: www.juliecantrell.com

Julie Cantrell (née Perkins; born 1973) is an American New York Times and USA Today bestselling author, editor and TEDx speaker who has written fiction, nonfiction and children’s picture books. She is known for her vivid depiction of the southern landscape and its strong, relatable characters.

== Early life and education ==
Cantrell was born in Baton Rouge, Louisiana, but spent most of her childhood in Walker, Louisiana.

She earned a bachelor of arts degree in 1995 and a master of arts in 1997 from Louisiana State University.

A member of Phi Kappa Phi, she graduated summa cum laude in Communication Sciences and Disorders as the Outstanding Senior of the College of Arts & Sciences. Her master’s thesis examined working memory deficits among children with specific language impairment.

== Career ==
Cantrell worked as a certified speech-language pathologist in medical and educational settings before focusing on writing and editing. Specializing in language development, Cantrell spent most of her career teaching children to read, write, and communicate. She served on the board of the Lafayette County Literacy Council in Oxford, Mississippi and helped launch an after-school program to strengthen the reading skills of at-risk elementary students.

Her first writing job was for Mothers of Preschoolers, Intl. (MOPS) where she wrote about parenting and child development. She then worked as a copywriter and editor for newspapers, magazines, non-profits and corporate clients. She’s also served as editor-in-chief of the Southern Literary Review and as a creative writing instructor at Story Summit and Drexel University.

Her first two books were designed to help young children cope with fear and anxiety (Zonderkidz, 2009).

Her debut novel, Into the Free, (David C Cook, 2012) made The New York Times Best Seller List at number 13 on March 11, 2012 and remained on that list at number 35 (March 18, 2012) and at number 32 (March 25, 2012).

That same novel also hit number 21 on The New York Times Best Seller List of Combined Print & Ebook Fiction, March 11, 2012.

The title made USA Today's best seller list for general fiction beginning March 1, 2012 for three weeks at #47 and #89. A USA Today HEA editor named Into the Free on the Favorite Books of the Year list for 2012.

== Reviews ==
Into the Free earned a Starred Review by Publishers Weekly who described Into the Free as “a visceral and gripping journey of a young woman’s revelations about God and self….” This novel,” it continued, “will surely excite any reader who appreciates a compelling story about personal struggle and spiritual resilience.

Library Journal gave The Feathered Bone a Starred Review and described the book as a “portrait of loss and heartbreak” that was “bound to be nominated for all the major CF literary awards.”

Redbook noted in its starred review that Cantrell’s fourth novel, Perennials, was “A stark exploration of the idea that home might not be the place it seems.”

=== Acknowledgments ===
Cantrell's debut novel was followed by a sequel, When Mountains Move, which continued the historical tale of Millie Reynolds through the World War II era. This second novel was selected as a Best Read of 2013 by USA Today HEA editor and LifeWay.

After these two works of historical fiction, Cantrell released two contemporary novels. The first, The Feathered Bone, set in her home state of Louisiana, was named a Best Read of 2016 by the Library Journal. It was a 2016 Okra Pick by the Southern Independent Booksellers Alliance, a Top Pick of 2016 by Romantic Times Reviews and a selection for the Winter Reading List by Deep South Magazine.

Her fourth novel, Perennials, set in Oxford, Mississippi, was named Southern Literary Review's December Read of the Month in 2017, a 2017 Fall Okra Pick by the Southern Independent Booksellers Alliance, and the Bonus Book of the year by the Pulpwood Queens International Book Club. And Redbook included Perennials in its "20 Books by Women You Have to Read This Fall" (2017).

Cantrell co-wrote a creative nonfiction book, Crescendo: The Story of a Musical Genius Who Forever Changed a Southern Town, with film producer Allen Cheney.

Through her own BlueSpark Editorial, Cantrell has contributed to numerous titles as a developmental editor, line editor, contributing author, or ghostwriter.

=== Awards ===
- Into the Free won the Mississippi Library Association Fiction Award (2013).
- Into the Free took two Christy Awards for both Debut Novel of the Year and Book of the Year in 2013
- Into the Free was named a Books-a-Million Summer Pick (2013).
- Into the Free was one of five finalists for the University of Mississippi Common Reading Experience (2014)
- Into the Free was rereleased as a Target Pick in 2016.
- When Mountains Move received the Carol Award for Historical Novel of the Year from the American Christian Fiction Writers in 2014.
- The Feathered Bone was an Ingram Pick in 2016.
- The Pulpwood Queens International Bookclub named The Feathered Bone their 2016 Book of the Year.
- Perennials was chosen as an Okra Pick by the Southern Independent Booksellers Alliance (2017).
- Perennials hit The Clarion-Ledger Mississippi Reads Best Seller List (Nov. 2017).
- Cantrell received the 2012 Mississippi Arts Commission Literary Arts Fellowship.
- Cantrell was awarded the 2016 Mary Elizabeth Nelson Fellowship at Rivendell Writer's Colony at Sewanee: The University of the South.
- She was chosen for the Pat Conroy Writer’s Residency Fellowship in 2020.

=== Appearances ===
Cantrell spoke at TEDx in 2017, giving a speech titled “Know Thyself: Two Questions That Will Change Your Life.” She has presented keynotes, served on panels, and led workshops across the country, participating in many literary festivals and events such as the Erma Bombeck Writers’ Workshop, Her Spirit Santa Fe 2021 and 2022, and the Pulpwood Queens Girlfriend Weekend 2021. She received the Mississippi Arts Commission Literary Fellowship in 2012.

== Bibliography ==
=== Historical fiction ===
- Into the Free (David C. Cook, Feb. 2012; HarperCollins, June 2016) (ISBN 0718037642)
- When Mountains Move (David C. Cook, Sept. 2013; HarperCollins, July 2016) (ISBN 0718037642)

=== Contemporary fiction ===
- The Feathered Bone (HarperCollins, Jan. 2016) (ISBN 0718037642)
- Perennials (HarperCollins, Nov. 2017) (ISBN 0718037642)
- It’s a Wonderful Christmas: Classics Reimagined (independently published, Oct. 2021) (ISBN 979-8488241695)

=== Creative nonfiction ===
- Crescendo by Allen Cheney with Julie Cantrell (HarperCollins, July 2019) (ISBN 0718037642)

=== Children’s books ===
- God is with me through the Day (2009, Zonderkidz) (ISBN 0718037642)
- God is with me through the Night (2009, Zonderkidz) (ISBN 0718037642)
- Rescue Dogs, Firefighting Heroes, and Science Facts: Four Stories and a Poem about Fire Safety’’ (2013, We Are Teachers) (ISBN 0718037642)
- Dog Saves Duck (2022, BlueSpark Press) (ISBN 0718037642)

=== Anthologies ===
- A Second Blooming: Becoming the Women we are Meant to Be (ISBN 0881466123)
- When You Pass Through Waters: Words of Hope and Healing from Your Favorite Authors (ISBN 0996940200)
- So Y’all Think You Can Write: Southern Writers on Writing (ISBN 1496815009)
