= Shadow People (film) =

2013 film written and directed by Matthew Arnold

- DVD poster
- Directed by: Matthew Arnold
- Written by: Matthew Arnold
- Story by: Matthew Arnold; Travis Rooks
- Produced by: Michael Ohoven
- Starring: Dallas Roberts; Alison Eastwood; Anne Dudek; Mattie Liptak
- Cinematography: Matthew Heckerling
- Edited by: Martin Hunter; Todd Killingsworth; Herbert James Winterstern
- Music by: Corey Wallace
- Production companies: Infinity Media; Upload Films
- Distributed by: Anchor Bay Films
- Release date: March 19, 2013 (USA)
- Running time: 89 minutes
- Country: United States
- Language: English

Shadow People (previously known as The Door) is a 2013 American supernatural horror thriller film written and directed by Matthew Arnold in his feature directorial debut. It stars Dallas Roberts, Alison Eastwood, Anne Dudek, and Mattie Liptak.

== Plot ==
The film begins with a series of videos posted to YouTube, with users of the website relating their experiences with unexplained sightings. Later, radio talk show host Charlie Crowe (Dallas Roberts) becomes convinced that mysterious nocturnal entities known as shadow people are responsible for a spate of deaths in his hometown. He is joined by CDC investigator Sophie Lacombe (Alison Eastwood), who seeks a more rational explanation.

== Cast ==
- Dallas Roberts as Charlie Crowe
- Alison Eastwood as Sophie Lacombe
- Anne Dudek as Ellen Camfield
- Mattie Liptak as Preston Camfield
- Mariah Bonner as Maggie Dunn
- Christopher Berry as Tom DiMartino
- Jonathan Baron as Jeff Pyatt
- Tony Schiena as Robert
- Ritchie Montgomery as Jim "Sparky" Taylor
- Raeden Greer as Britney Daniels
- Gary Grubbs as James Gering, CDC Director
- Bryan Massey as Bill Ryder
- Marco St. John as Professor Norman Fisher
- Jaqueline Fleming as Nurse Marian Sobel
- Billy Slaughter as TV Anchor
- Brittani Louise Taylor as Vlogger

== Production ==
Shadow People was filmed in Baton Rouge, Louisiana, and Phnom Penh, Cambodia.

The film mixes dramatic scenes with both real and simulated archival footage. The simulated footage includes interviews with the characters from the dramatic scenes, while the actual footage incorporates segments from the 2008 web documentary Your Worst Nightmare.

The movie is dedicated to victims of Sudden Unexplained Nocturnal Death Syndrome (SUNDS).

== Release ==
The film made its Marché du Film premiere during the 2012 Cannes Film Festival. It was released on DVD and Blu-ray on March 19, 2013.

== Reception ==
Matt Molgaard of Best Horror Movies wrote, "This is a stirring flick, and in truth, I’d be holding back if I called Shadow People anything other than an outstanding success that far exceeded expectations ... Shadow People has already established itself as one of 2013’s most inspired efforts." David Maine of PopMatters wrote, "Shadow People is a spooky little movie that could have been much spookier, but still makes good use of its limited means to convey an unsettling story." Ain't It Cool News declared that "it made me think twice about turning on the light as I went to bed. Any film that does that is a winner in my book." Brad McHargue of Dread Central rated the film 1.5 out of 5 stars and called the film "novel and ambitious" but too messy to fulfill the potential of the premise. Pat Torfe of Bloody Disgusting rated the film 2.5 out of 5 stars, writing that Shadow People lacks balance and "doesn't know what it is." Thomas Marcum of The Crypto Crew said "the movie is well done all the way around and well worth watching".
