= Brown Hotel and Cafe =

- Brown Hotel & Café
- U.S. National Register of Historic Places
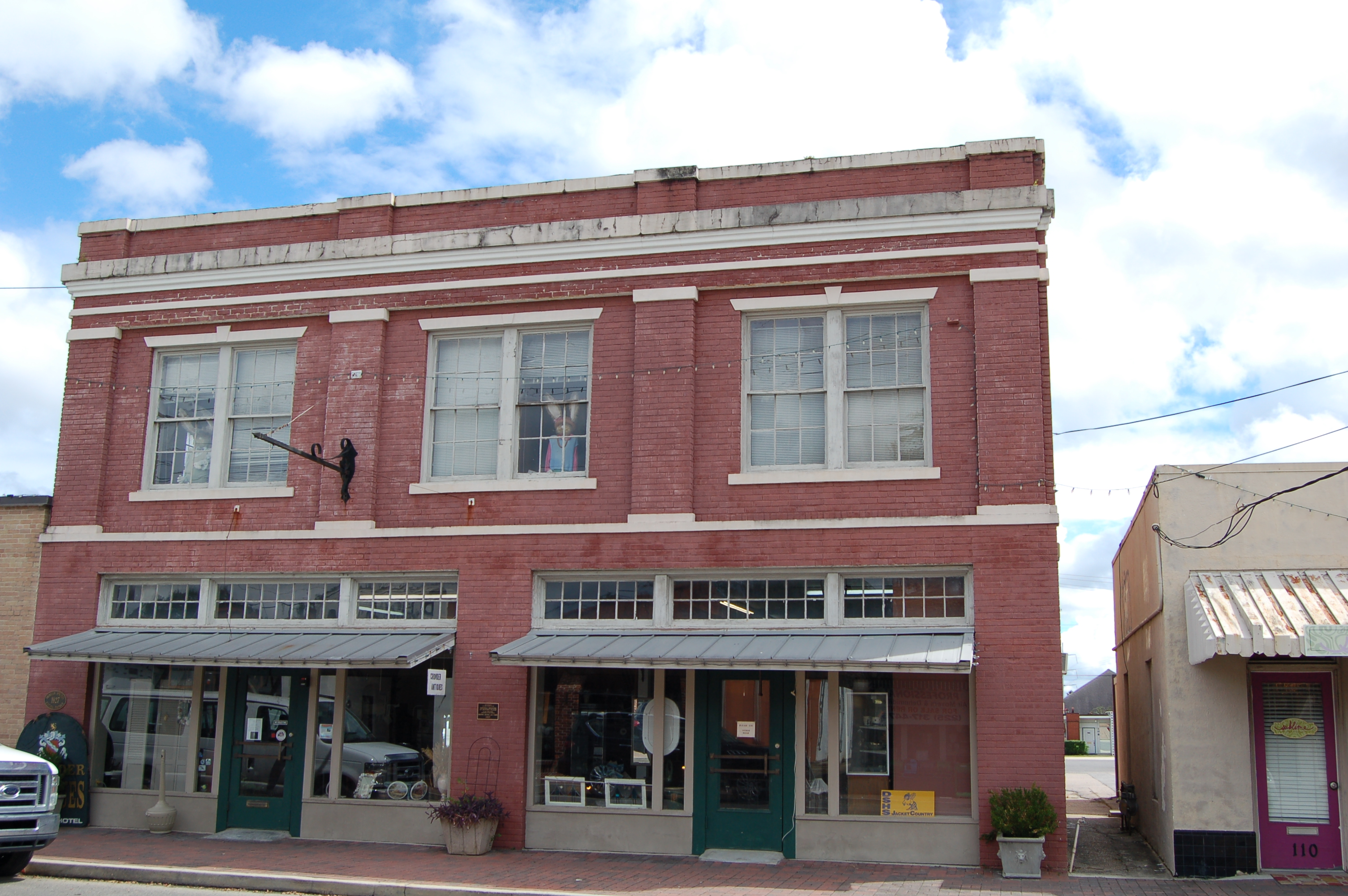

- Location within Louisiana Location within the United States
- Location: 114 North Range Avenue, Denham Springs, Louisiana
- Coordinates: 30°29′06″N 90°57′21″W
- Area: Less than one acre
- Built: 1927
- Built by: Mr. William F. Brown
- Architectural style: Commercial Style
- NRHP reference No.: 15000695
- Added to NRHP: October 6, 2015

The Brown Hotel & Café is a historic building located at 114 North Range Avenue in Denham Springs, Louisiana, United States.

Built in 1927 by Mr. William F. Brown, it is a two-story masonry Commercial Style building which served as the city principal and only hotel until its closure in 1955. The building was bought by former Denham Springs mayor Shelly O'Neal, which dismantled the interior after the purchase. In 1973 the building was purchased by Alex Theriot & Associates which used first floor as their engineering offices and leased the lower floor to printing companies. The lower floor was leased to Old Hotel Antiques in 1994. In 2000 the building was bought by Charles and Florence Crower, which operates Crower Antiques in the lower floor. The upper floor is leased for offices and storage. The original facade was restored to its pre-1955 look in 2006.

The building was listed on the National Register of Historic Places on October 6, 2015.

== See also ==
- National Register of Historic Places listings in Livingston Parish, Louisiana
