= Emerald City (TV series) =

2017 American fantasy TV series

- Genre: Adventure; Drama; Fantasy
- Based on: Oz book series by L. Frank Baum
- Developed by: Matthew Arnold; Josh Friedman
- Directed by: Tarsem Singh
- Starring: Adria Arjona; Oliver Jackson-Cohen; Ana Ularu; Mido Hamada; Gerran Howell; Jordan Loughran; Joely Richardson; Vincent D'Onofrio
- Composer: Trevor Morris
- Country of origin: United States
- Original language: English
- No. of seasons: 1
- No. of episodes: 10

Production
- Executive producers: David Schulner; Shaun Cassidy; Matthew Arnold; Josh Friedman; Tarsem Singh
- Producers: Tommy Turtle; Chris Thompson
- Production locations: Croatia; Hungary; Spain (Park Güell, Barcelona; Alcázar of Seville, Seville; etc.)
- Cinematography: Colin Watkinson
- Camera setup: Single-camera
- Running time: 43 minutes
- Production companies: Shaun Cassidy Productions; Oedipus Productions; Mount Moriah; Universal Television

Original release
- Network: NBC
- Release: January 6 – March 3, 2017

Emerald City is an American fantasy drama television series developed for NBC by Matthew Arnold and Josh Friedman based on the early 20th-century Oz book series written by L. Frank Baum, set in the fictional Land of Oz. Directed by Tarsem Singh and starring Adria Arjona, Oliver Jackson-Cohen, Ana Ularu and Vincent D'Onofrio, Emerald City received a 10-episode order by NBC in April 2015, which premiered on January 6, 2017, with a two-episode debut, and concluded on March 3, 2017. On May 5, 2017, NBC canceled the series after one season.

== Premise ==
After being transported from Lucas, Kansas, to the Land of Oz by a tornado, 20-year-old Dorothy Gale sets out to find the Wizard, unaware that she is about to fulfill a prophecy that will change everyone's lives forever.

== Cast and characters ==
=== Main ===
- Adria Arjona as Dorothy Gale: a nurse from Lucas, Kansas who embarks on a perilous journey to Emerald City in an attempt to meet the Wizard and find her way back home.
- Oliver Jackson-Cohen as Roan / Lucas: an amnesiac who accompanies Dorothy in an attempt to regain his lost memory and quickly finds himself falling in love with her.
- Ana Ularu as West: the former Witch of the West, one of the Cardinal Witches – the four most powerful of the 1,000-plus witches in Oz. West is the opium-addicted madam of a brothel who continues to use her magical abilities despite the fact that she blames magic for failing to save her fellow witches.
- Mido Hamada as Eamonn: an unquestioningly loyal member of the Wizard's Guard who is personally tasked with finding Dorothy before she reaches Emerald City and doing whatever it takes to prevent the Beast Forever's return. He is a composite of Omby Amby and the Cowardly Lion
- Gerran Howell as Jack: a young man who is reanimated following a horrific accident and forced into servitude only to find himself growing close to his new mistress. He is a composite of Jack Pumpkinhead, Nick Chopper, and Tik-Tok.
- Jordan Loughran as Ozma / Tip: a teenager who sets out to discover her true-self after being freed from a spell that has kept her in the form of a boy for most of her life.
- Joely Richardson as Glinda: the former Witch of the North, one of the four powerful Cardinal Witches. Glinda runs an orphanage for potential members of the Wizard's High Council and has held a deep-seated hatred towards the Wizard ever since he outlawed magic.
- Vincent D'Onofrio as Frank Morgan / The Wizard of Oz: an enigmatic figure who sought to reinvent himself by ruling Oz and, in doing so, created a world where magic is outlawed. The character is named after Frank Morgan, who played the Wizard in the 1939 film.

=== Recurring ===
- Florence Kasumba as East: the Witch of the East, one of the Cardinal Witches - the four most powerful of the 1,000-plus witches in Oz. East created the Prison of the Abject, holding witches who illegally practiced magic. East keeps deals with the Wizard for her own purposes and is on a fight against her sister Glinda.
- Isabel Lucas as Anna: a member of the Wizard's High Council who quickly becomes his closest advisor after challenging his theory about the Beast Forever's return.
- Roxy Sternberg as Elizabeth: a member of the Wizard's High Council who is determined to prove herself and protect Oz from the Beast Forever.
- Stefanie Martini as Langwidere: the eccentric Princess of Ev who is determined to exact vengeance against the Wizard for leaving her mother and her people to die at the Beast Forever's hands.
- Rebeka Rea as Leith / Sylvie: a child witch with dangerous abilities whom Dorothy and Lucas first come across in the woods near Nimbo and who seems to recognize Lucas.
- Gina McKee as Dr. Jane Andrews: a contractor for the Royal Family of Ev who shares a mysterious connection to both Dorothy and the Wizard.
- Ólafur Darri Ólafsson as Ojo: a member of the Munja'kin tribe who is determined to do whatever it takes to save his wife Nahara from the Prison of the Abject.

== Production ==
The series was created by Matthew Arnold who pitched an alternative telling, a dark, edgy version of The Wizard of Oz to Universal Television. Arnold wrote the pilot script, which then received a 10 episode direct-to-series order on NBC. Josh Friedman was brought on as showrunner.

The series was originally slated to air in 2015, with filming scheduled to begin in 2014. However, it was cancelled before entering production due to creative differences between Friedman and the studio.

On April 15, 2015, NBC reversed course and decided to go ahead with the series. On July 14, 2015, it was announced that Tarsem Singh would direct all ten episodes, with David Schulner as new showrunner, replacing Josh Friedman, and Shaun Cassidy coming on board as executive producer.

== Episodes ==
No.	Title	Directed by	Written by	Original release date	US viewers (millions)
1	"The Beast Forever"	Tarsem Singh	Story by : Matthew Arnold and Josh Friedman; Teleplay by : Josh Friedman and Matthew Arnold	January 6, 2017	4.49
Dorothy Gale, a 20-year old Kansas nurse, wants to renew her relationship with her biological mother Karen, who gave her up for adoption. During a storm, Dorothy goes to Karen's trailer, finding a corpse inside and her mother lying injured in a storm shelter. Dorothy is confronted by a police officer but she ducks into his squad car, the twister transporting it and a police dog to the Land of Oz, Dorothy running over the Wicked Witch of the East. Taken to a tribal village led by Ojo, Dorothy is warned the witch's death will make her a target for the Wizard and other witches like Glinda and West. Dorothy travels to the Emerald City with Toto, meeting an amnesiac, crucified man she names Lucas. The two are confronted by the resurrected East, but Dorothy fools her into shooting herself in the head using a police gun. The Wizard dispatches his soldier Eamonn to find Dorothy.
2	"Prison of the Abject"	Tarsem Singh	Story by : Matthew Arnold and Josh Friedman; Teleplay by : Justin Doble and David Schulner	January 6, 2017	4.49
Glinda and West prepare to store East's soul and spells within their sacred temple, sealed up by the Wizard as per his ban on magic. The Wizard opens up the ceremony to the public, the ritual terrifying them and changing their once respected view on the witches. Eamonn and a band of soldiers track Dorothy, but when one of his subordinates tries to murder him so they can go home, Eamonn kills him off-screen. Lucas falls ill, Dorothy taking him to the witch Mombi for help. Mombi points out a sword Lucas carries belongs to one of the Wizard's soldiers, who persecute magic practitioners. Dorothy discovers Mombi's ward Tip is imprisoned but Mombi claims it is for his own good since he is ill. Mombi poisons Lucas, but Dorothy heals him. She frees Tip with help from his friend Jack, both boys fleeing into the night. Mombi tries to murder Dorothy, but Lucas stabs her with the sword before beating her to death, though it is implied she survived. The next day, Jack discovers Tip has transformed into a girl.
3	"Mistress - New - Mistress"	Tarsem Singh	Story by : Justin Doble and Nichole Beattie; Teleplay by : Justin Doble and David Schulner	January 13, 2017	3.22
Dorothy, Lucas, and Toto stop traveling towards the Emerald City when they learn of the Wizard's orders to kill Dorothy. They go to East's castle, where Dorothy hopes to use a tornado to go back home. She poses as East's successor and is asked to use her magic gloves to stop the out-of-control weather. Dorothy is sucked into the tornado, lands elsewhere in Oz, and finds her mother Karen's lab coat, revealing Karen was in Oz. East's castle is destroyed by the tornado as the three escape. In Emerald City, three witches publicly commit suicide and the Wizard asks Anna to investigate. She realizes that he lacks magic and is promptly imprisoned. Tip and Jack travel to the Land of Ev to gain more medicine, but a chemist explains the medicine was suppressing Tip's true gender. Later, in confused response, Jack kisses Tip, who angrily pushes him away, and he falls to his death.
4	"Science and Magic"	Tarsem Singh	Story by : Sheri Holman; Teleplay by : Shaun Cassidy	January 20, 2017	2.83
Dorothy and Lucas encounter a mute girl whilst travelling through a forest. Dorothy takes her to a nearby village, but Eamonn and his soldiers are patrolling it. The girl is claimed by a suspicious-looking couple, whom Dorothy later finds turned to stone. Eamonn confronts Dorothy and recognises Lucas' sword. Dorothy shoots him and escapes with Lucas; they kiss in the woods. The next day, Lucas is found by Eamonn and Dorothy is knocked out by Ojo. The Wizard and Anna find a magic portal in the village of Nimbo, but it disappears. The Wizard blackmails the village elder into embracing the way of science. Tip contemplates suicide after apparently killing Jack, but is taken to Glinda's household. Given the choice between joining Glinda's nuns or West's courtesans, she chooses West but requests to be taught magic. Jack has been saved by a surgeon named Jane, and given a mechanical body. He is distressed by his condition, and meets the eccentric Princess Langwidere, to whom Jane has sold him as a servant.
5	"Everybody Lies"	Tarsem Singh	Story by : Halley Gross; Teleplay by : Naomi Hisako Iizuka	January 27, 2017	2.79
Determined to exact revenge for her sister's death, West captures Dorothy and uses magic to interrogate her. Dorothy is repaid by Tip, now West's acolyte, for a previous good deed. The Wizard seeks aid from the Kingdom of Ev to build a weapons arsenal to help him defeat the Beast Forever. Meanwhile, Lucas learns that Eamonn is an old acquaintance, who knows that Lucas' name is Roan, and may hold the key for Lucas to recover his lost memories.
6	"Beautiful Wickedness"	Tarsem Singh	Story by : Leah Fong; Teleplay by : Kelly Sue DeConnick	February 3, 2017	2.42
Dorothy's confrontation with the Wizard brings her closer to discovering the truth about her past. Lucas goes to great lengths to recover his memory, even if it means allying with West. The Wizard enacts his plan with Langwidere to prepare for the battle to come.
7	"They Came First"	Tarsem Singh	Tracy Bellomo	February 10, 2017	2.34
The Wizard launches an assault on a village as his power is threatened and he enlists West to help. Dorothy and Lucas fight to keep Silvie safe as they journey north to seek Glinda's assistance. After suffering a great loss, Langwidere grapples with her new authority as her relationship with Jack continues to become complicated.
8	"Lions in Winter"	Tarsem Singh	Shaun Cassidy	February 17, 2017	2.47
When Dorothy and Lucas arrive at Glinda's castle, a spell is lifted, revealing that he truly is Roan – and Glinda's husband. The Wizard heads to the Kingdom of Ev to build his weapons arsenal. West takes a dangerous step, having Tip drink the magic extracted from East's corpse, to help Tip understand her past – revealing she is Ozma, sole survivor of Oz' murdered royal house. In the Kingdom of Ev, Jack struggles to find his place in Langwidere's life.
9	"The Villain That's Become"	Tarsem Singh	Tracy Bellomo	February 24, 2017	2.36
When the Wizard and his army arrives in the Kingdom of Ev, Langwidere accepts his gold but refuses to deliver the guns. When the Wizard takes her hostage, Jack tries to help, but he shoots Langwidere when the Wizard pulls her into the path of the bullet – then learns from Jane that Langwidere will “survive”, as she had built Langwidere years earlier. Dorothy and Lucas find themselves on opposite sides as Dorothy defeats Lucas and leaves him for dead up on a cross as she found him. West helps Tip control the magic essence of East that she drank, but Tip uses it to return to her male form. West convinces Tip to revert to her natural female/Ozma form, and they solidify their bond as they free dozens of battle-tried witches from the Prison of the Abject. Dorothy uses magic to free a flayed prisoner in the Prison, and to help Ojo see Nahara before she dies in the Prison; Nahara repays her with control of the Stone Giants. Dorothy arrives at Ev, with a giant, moments before the Wizard is to be executed.
10	"No Place Like Home"	Tarsem Singh	Josh Carlebach & David Schulner	March 3, 2017	2.87
Ozma, West and the elder witches free Emerald City, and Ozma is crowned queen. Eamonn surrenders himself and states he killed Ozma's parents to please the Wizard, but couldn't kill Ozma, because she reminded him of his daughter, and he submits himself for punishment. Ozma sentences him to wander Oz in the skin of the lion. Jack and Jane make their way to the Wizard's camp to kill him, but the Wizard stops them with the revelation that Jane's daughter is nearby. When Glinda and her army attack the Wizard, Dorothy tries to reason with her, trying to avoid war. Dorothy states she has a Stone Giant on her side, but Glinda has Silvie use her power to destroy it. The Wizard's men shoot Glinda's young witches, but the weapons turn out to be useless, as only a witch can kill another witch. West convinces Glinda that they must support Ozma, returning to the balance of the past. Dorothy returns home and starts to believe that everything that happened was a dream. Then Lucas appears and tells her that she's needed back in Oz to help fight the Beast Forever, who has returned – revealed to be the flayed man that Dorothy had freed from the Prison of the Abject.

=== Special ===
A special episode, titled "Oz Reimagined: The Making of Emerald City", originally aired on December 16, 2016, and detailed the behind the scenes of the series including locations, effects, costumes and interviews.

== Broadcast ==
The series premiered on January 6, 2017 in the U.S. on NBC. The series launched on 5Star in the UK on February 8, 2017 to 670,000 viewers, the TV station's largest audience to date.

== Reception ==
=== Ratings ===
The series premiered to low ratings among the demographic of adults aged 18–49, which continued to decline throughout its first season. The series finale drew in 2.9 million viewers. It ended as one of the lowest rated NBC series of 2017.

=== Critical reception ===
The review aggregator website Rotten Tomatoes reported a 38% approval rating based on 42 reviews, with an average score of 5.2/10. The website's consensus reads, "Dark and brooding, but also confusing and contrived, Emerald City is the Game of Thrones/Wizard of Oz mashup nobody asked for." Metacritic reported a score of 47 out of 100 based on 31 reviews, indicating "mixed or average reviews".

== Home media ==
DVD name	Ep #	Release date	Region
Emerald City: Season One	10	July 25, 2017	Region 1
