= French Settlement, Louisiana =

- Village
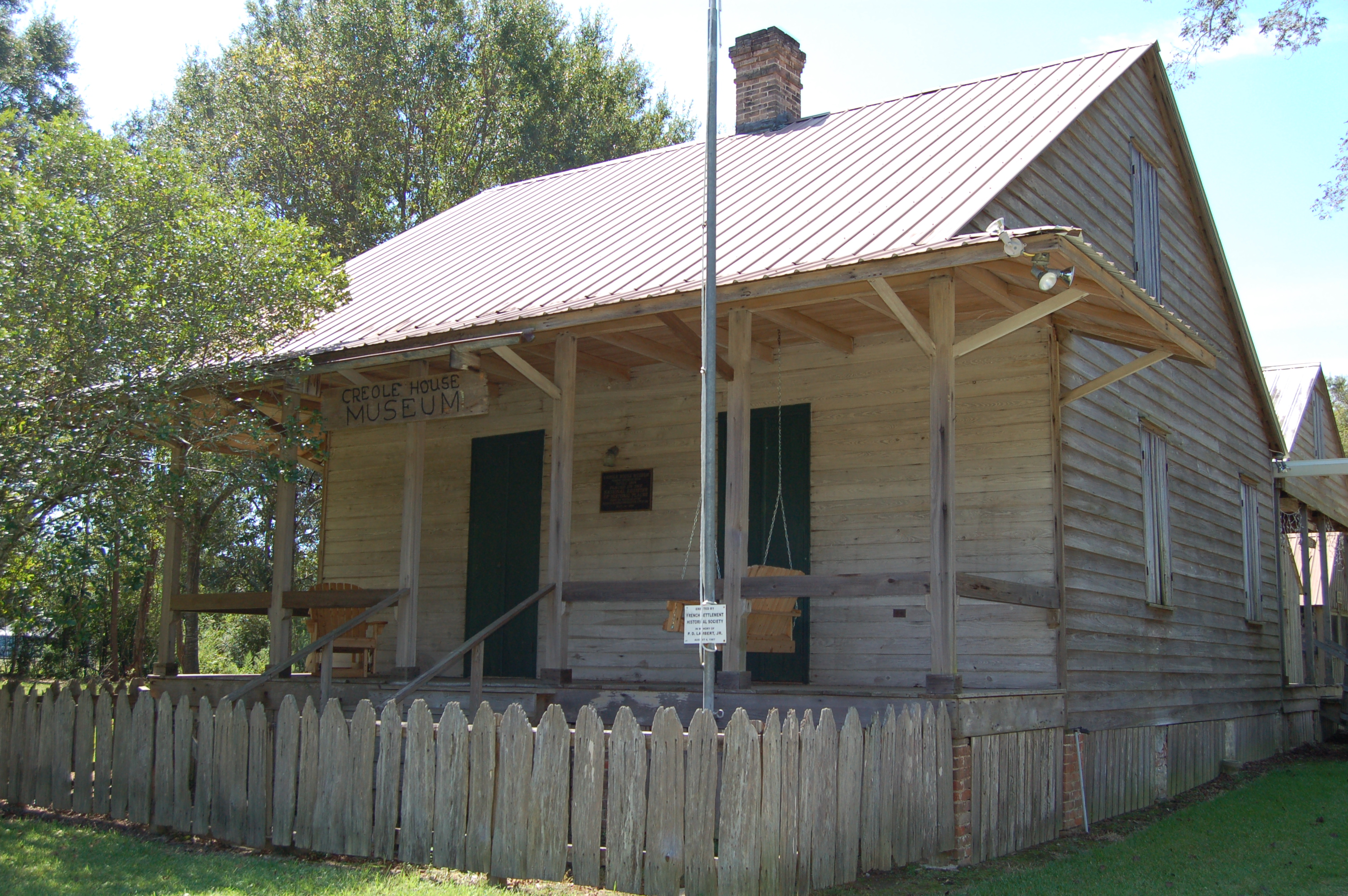
- The Creole House Museum

- Location of French Settlement in Livingston Parish, Louisiana.

- Location of Louisiana in the United States
- Coordinates: 30°18′16″N 90°48′56″W
- Country: United States
- State: Louisiana
- Parish: Livingston
- Incorporated: June 13, 1965

Government
  - Mayor: Haley Unbehagen

Area
  - Total: 2.76 sq mi (7.15 km^{2})
  - Land: 2.73 sq mi (7.06 km^{2})
  - Water: 0.035 sq mi (0.09 km^{2})
- Elevation: 13 ft (4.0 m)

Population (2020)
  - Total: 1,073
  - Density: 393.5/sq mi (151.93/km^{2})
- Time zone: UTC-6 (CST)
  - Summer (DST): UTC-5 (CDT)
- ZIP code: 70733
- Area code: 225
- FIPS code: 22-27435
- Website: frenchsettlement-la.gov

French Settlement (historically French: La Côte-Française) is a village in Livingston Parish, Louisiana, United States. The population was 1,073 in 2020. It is part of the Baton Rouge metropolitan statistical area.

== History ==
French Settlement was settled in 1800 via the Amite River by French, German, and Italian immigrants. The area was a thriving center of commerce, including cypress sawmills, animal trappers, shingle-making, farms, and a steamboat port.

French Settlement has four houses on the National Register of Historic Places listings in Livingston Parish, Louisiana: Decareaux House, Deslattes House, Guitreau House, and Lobell House.

== Geography ==
According to the United States Census Bureau, the village has a total area of 2.7 square miles (7.0 km^{2}), of which 2.7 square miles (7.0 km^{2}) is land and 0.37% is water.

== Demographics ==
Historical population
Census	Pop.	Note	%±
1970	670		—
1980	761		13.6%
1990	829		8.9%
2000	945		14.0%
2010	1,116		18.1%
2020	1,073		−3.9%
2025 (est.)	1,166	▲	8.7%
U.S. Decennial Census

French Settlement racial composition as of 2020
Race	Number	Percentage
White (non-Hispanic)	978	91.15%
Black or African American (non-Hispanic)	9	0.84%
Native American	3	0.28%
Asian	15	1.4%
Other/Mixed	42	3.91%
Hispanic or Latino	26	2.42%

As of the 2020 United States census, there were 1,073 people, 348 households, and 240 families residing in the village. As of the census of 2000, there were 945 people, 359 households, and 276 families residing in the village. The population density was 349.0 inhabitants per square mile (134.7/km^{2}). There were 436 housing units at an average density of 161.0 per square mile (62.2/km^{2}). The racial makeup of the village was 99.26% White, 0.21% Asian, 0.11% from other races, and 0.42% from two or more races. Hispanic or Latino of any race were 1.90% of the population.

There were 359 households, out of which 31.8% had children under the age of 18 living with them, 65.2% were married couples living together, 7.0% had a female householder with no husband present, and 23.1% were non-families. 18.4% of all households were made up of individuals, and 7.8% had someone living alone who was 65 years of age or older. The average household size was 2.63 and the average family size was 2.99.

In the village, the population was spread out, with 25.8% under the age of 18, 8.5% from 18 to 24, 29.3% from 25 to 44, 24.0% from 45 to 64, and 12.4% who were 65 years of age or older. The median age was 37 years. For every 100 females, there were 95.7 males. For every 100 females age 18 and over, there were 98.0 males.

The median income for a household in the village was $38,563, and the median income for a family was $41,518. Males had a median income of $36,875 versus $18,500 for females. The per capita income for the village was $17,660. About 5.6% of families and 7.0% of the population were below the poverty line, including 9.9% of those under age 18 and 6.0% of those age 65 or over.

== Education ==
French Settlement is within the Livingston Parish Public Schools system.

French Settlement is served by French Settlement Elementary School and French Settlement High School.
