= Lobell =

Lobell is a surname. Notable people with the surname include:

- Daniel Lobell, American stand-up comedian
- David Lobell, American agricultural ecologist and professor
- Mike Lobell, American film producer
- Mimi Lobell (1942–2001) American architect, professor, cultural historian, and second-wave feminist
- Johann Wilhelm Löbell (1786–1863), German historian
