= Springfield High School (Louisiana) =

Location
- 32000 Highway 42; Springfield, (Livingston Parish), Louisiana 70462; United States; 30.4301°N 90.5508°W

Information
- Type: Public high school
- School district: Livingston Parish School Board
- Principal: Jill Dupuy
- Staff: 31.49 (FTE)
- Enrollment: 427 (2023-2024)
- Student to teacher ratio: 13.56
- Colors: Royal blue and white
- Mascot: Bulldogs
- Website: www.springfieldhighschool.org

Springfield High School in Springfield, Louisiana, is a co-educational public high school under the Livingston Parish School Board. The school currently serves around 400 students from the communities of Springfield and Killian in Livingston Parish, Louisiana and other surrounding cities with certain exceptions.

== History ==
The earliest known record of a graduating class was the Class of 1923, in which two males and three females were among the honorees. The original school buildings were burned down sometime in the 1970s. The only building that remained largely intact was the modern "3rd Hall" structure.

== Academics ==
The average ACT Score is a 24 and the graduation rate is 92% amongst students from 9-12 grade.

== Athletics ==
Springfield High competes as a member of the Louisiana High School Athletic Association (LHSAA) Class 2A. The School's Mascot is a bulldog, and the teams are referred to as the "Bulldogs" and the "Lady Bulldogs".

The Springfield High School Boys Basketball team has appeared in the Louisiana Class 2A Boys Basketball State Championship Game three times, winning in 1982 and 1997.

Springfield High Football began in 1965.
