= Livingston Parish Public Schools =

School district in Louisiana, United States

Livingston Parish Public Schools (LPPS) is a school district headquartered in Livingston, Louisiana, United States with 42 schools, with approximately 25,500 students enrolled for the 2012 - 2013 school year.. The district's superintendent Bill Spear retired in early 2013. John Watson was named his successor, but he retired in 2016. Homer "Rick" Wentzel is now superintendent. There are nine districts in the school system. The Livingston Parish School system has been recognized for excelling in education in Louisiana.

The district serves all of Livingston Parish.

== Schools ==
This is only a partial list of schools that Livingston Parish Public Schools operates.

=== K-12 schools ===
Zoned

- Holden High School (Holden)
- Maurepas School (Maurepas, Unincorporated area)

Special needs school

- Pine Ridge School (Walker)

=== 6-12 schools ===
- Livingston Parish Literacy & Technology Center (Walker)
- Doyle High School (Livingston)

=== 9-12 schools ===
- Albany High School (Albany)
- Live Oak High School (Unincorporated area) (Watson)
- Springfield High School (Springfield)

=== 7-12 schools ===
- French Settlement High School (French Settlement)

=== 10-12 schools ===
- Denham Springs High School (Denham Springs)
- Walker High School (Walker)

=== 9th grade only schools ===
- Denham Springs Freshman High School (Denham Springs)
- Walker Freshman High School (Walker)

=== PK-8 schools ===
- Frost School (Unincorporated area) (Colyell, Louisiana)

=== 4-8 schools ===
- Springfield Middle School (Springfield)

=== 6-8 schools ===
- Denham Springs Junior High School (Denham Springs)
- Juban Parc Junior High School (Denham Springs)
- North Corbin Junior High School (Walker, Louisiana)
- Southside Junior High School (Denham Springs, LA)
- Westside Junior High School (Walker)

=== 7-8 schools ===
- Live Oak Junior High (Watson)

=== K-5 schools ===
- Denham Springs Elementary School (Denham Springs)
- Eastside Elementary School (Unincorporated area)
- Freshwater Elementary School (Denham Springs)
- Gray's Creek Elementary School (Unincorporated area)
- Juban Parc Elementary (Denham Springs)
- Levi Milton Elementary School (Walker)
- North Corbin Elementary School (Unincorporated area)
- North Live Oak Elementary School (Unincorporated area)
- Northside Elementary School (Denham Springs)
- Seventh Ward Elementary School (Unincorporated area)
- South Live Oak Elementary (Unincorporated area)

South Live Oak Elementary used to be known as Live Oak Upper Elementary School.

- South Walker Elementary School (Walker)
- South Fork Elementary School (Denham Springs)
- Southside Elementary School (Denham Springs)
- Lewis Vincent Elementary School (Unincorporated area)
- Walker Elementary School (Walker)

=== 3-4 schools ===
- Albany Upper Elementary School (Albany)

=== K-4 schools ===
- Springfield Elementary School (Springfield)
- Live Oak Elementary School (Unincorporated area)

Live Oak Elementary School used to be known as Live Oak Lower Elementary School.

- Doyle Elementary School (Livingston)

=== PK-2 schools ===
- Albany Lower Elementary School (Albany)

=== 5-8 schools ===
- Albany Middle School (Albany)

=== 6-8 schools ===
- Live Oak Middle (Watson)

=== K-6 schools ===
- French Settlement Elementary School (French Settlement)
