= Albany, Louisiana =

Town in Louisiana

- Town
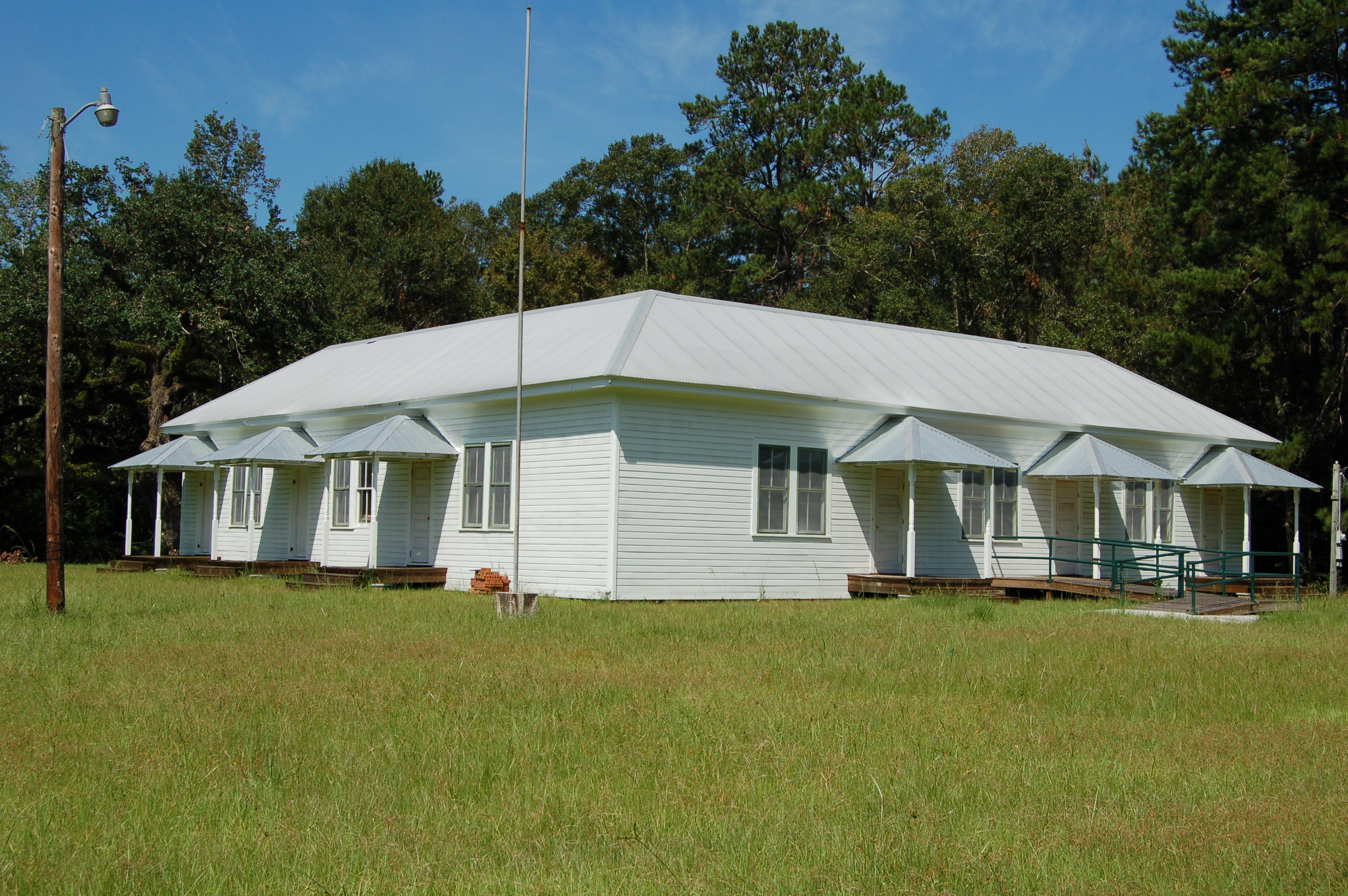
- Hungarian Settlement School in Albany

- Location of Albany in Livingston Parish, Louisiana.

- Location of Louisiana in the United States
- Coordinates: 30°30′16″N 90°34′56″W
- Country: United States
- State: Louisiana
- Parish: Livingston
- Incorporated: October 7, 1953

Government
  - Mayor: Eileen Bates-McCarroll (R) (elected 2018)

Area
  - Total: 1.34 sq mi (3.47 km^{2})
  - Land: 1.34 sq mi (3.47 km^{2})
  - Water: 0 sq mi (0.00 km^{2})
- Elevation: 39 ft (12 m)

Population (2020)
  - Total: 1,235
  - Estimate (2024): 1,247 ▲
  - Density: 921.7/sq mi (355.88/km^{2})
- Time zone: UTC-6 (CST)
  - Summer (DST): UTC-5 (CDT)
- ZIP code: 70711
- Area code: 225
- GNIS feature ID: 2407407
- FIPS code: 22-00835
- Website: townofalbanyla.com

Albany is a town in eastern Livingston Parish, Louisiana, United States. The population was 1,088 at the 2010 census and 1,235 in 2020. It is part of the Baton Rouge metropolitan statistical area.

District 95 State Representative Sherman Q. Mack, an attorney, resides in Albany.

== Etymology ==
It is speculated that the name of the community is derived from the Choctaw word abani which means "to cook over a fire" in the Choctaw language. After interviewing many of the older residents and comparing their answers it was determined that the community was named after the nearby Natalbany River. During an interview Mrs. George (Mary Addison) Cunningham who was born on November 11, 1884, stated that when the Illinois Central Railroad built a line through the town they tried to name the community Natalbany but the railroad and post office refused the name because there was already a community with the same name.

== Hungarian Settlement ==
Historic Hungarian Settlement is in Albany. Between 1896 and 1920 hundreds of Hungarian immigrants settled here and named the community Árpádhon. In 1900, there were eleven families living in the Hungarian Settlement and by 1908 there were about forty Hungarian families on new farms in the area. By 1910, there were sixty-five families. In 1920, there were about two hundred families on farms in the area. The Hungarian name is derived from Árpád, the leader of the Hungarian tribes and -hon meaning home. Árpádhon was the largest rural Hungarian settlement in the United States at that time with an estimated 350 Hungarian families living within the community. During the 1930s many of the Hungarian families became strawberry farmers.

== Geography ==
Albany is located at the intersection of U.S. Route 190 and Louisiana Highway 43 and I-12 passes south of the city. The Little Natalbany River flows past the east side of the city and joins the Natalbany River approximately two miles to the southeast.

According to the United States Census Bureau, the town has a total area of 1.1 square miles (2.8 km^{2}), all land.

== Demographics ==
Historical population
Census	Pop.	Note	%±
1960	557		—
1970	700		25.7%
1980	857		22.4%
1990	645		−24.7%
2000	865		34.1%
2010	1,088		25.8%
2020	1,235		13.5%
2025 (est.)	1,244	▲	0.7%
U.S. Decennial Census

As of the census of 2000, there were 865 people, 371 households, and 234 families residing in the town. By the 2010 census, its population grew to 1,088; in 2020, its population was 1,235.

== Cultural and historic sites ==
- The Hungarian Settlement School is located in Albany and was listed on the National Register of Historic Places on August 2, 2001. The old school is home to the Hungarian Settlement Museum and the grand opening was celebrated on September 27, 2017.
- In 1909, a twenty-acre church site was donated by Mr. and Mrs. Joseph Juhasz and in that same year, Archbishop James Blenk from the Archdiocese of New Orleans approved the official name of St. Margaret Catholic Church
- Albany Plantation, which promotes the heritage of the French Cajun culture of Louisiana, sits on 34 acres of land.

== Education ==
Albany is within the Livingston Parish Public Schools system.

Schools that serve Albany include:

- Albany Lower Elementary School (Louisiana)
- Albany Upper Elementary School (Louisiana)
- Albany Middle School (Louisiana)
- Albany High School

== Government ==
The town has a Mayor and a Board of Aldermen. It is governed by the Lawrason Act, with an elected Chief of Police and a Mayor's Court.

== See also ==
- List of municipalities in Louisiana
