= Adam Lobell House =

Historic house in Louisiana, United States

- U.S. National Register of Historic Places
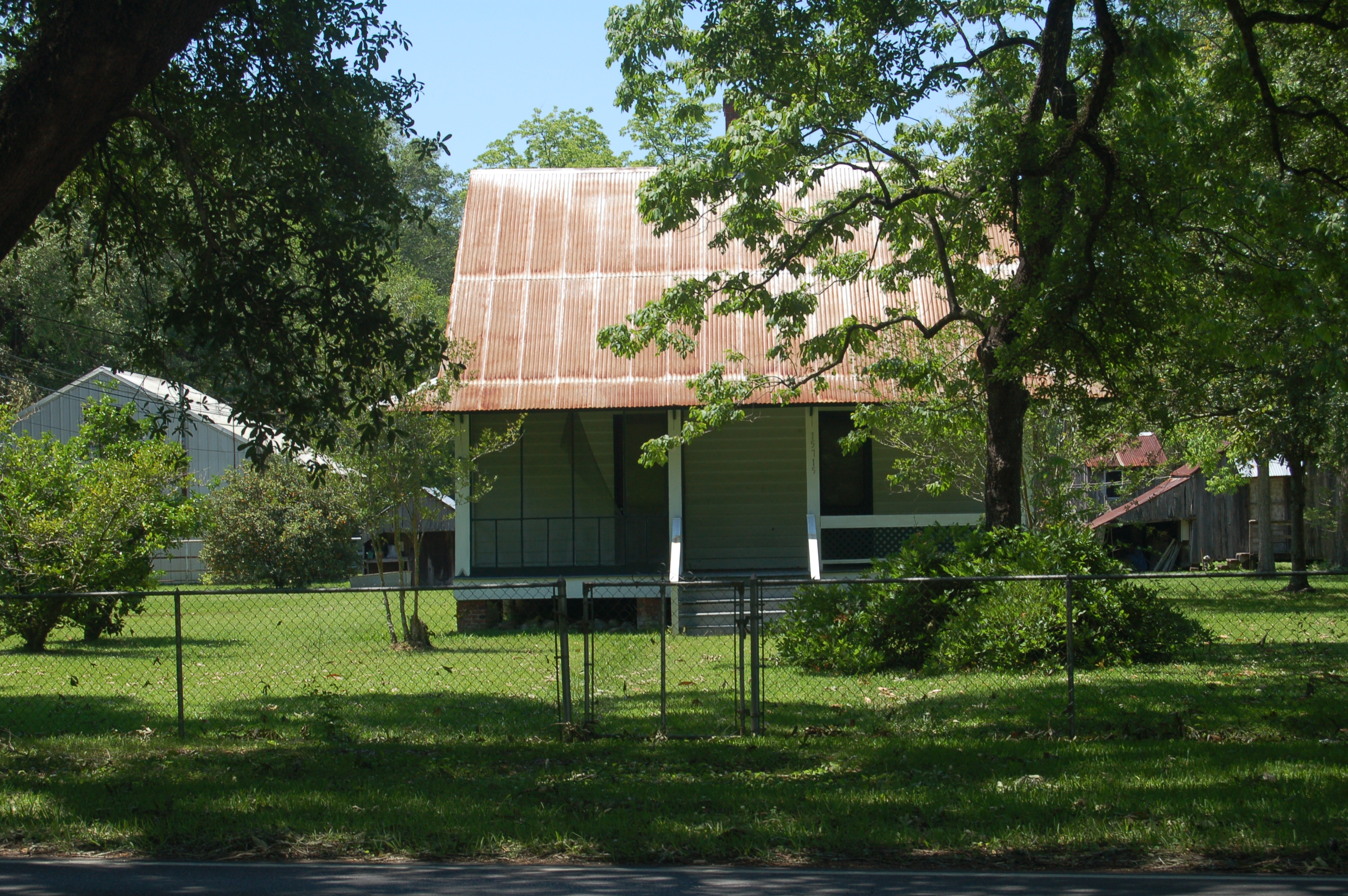

- Location within Louisiana Location within the United States
- Location: 15715 LA 16, French Settlement, Louisiana
- Coordinates: 30°17′40″N 90°47′45″W
- Area: 1 acre (0.40 ha)
- Built: c.1862
- Architectural style: French Creole
- NRHP reference No.: 92000509
- Added to NRHP: May 14, 1992

The Adam Lobell House is a historic house located at 15715 Louisiana Highway 16 in French Settlement, Louisiana, United States.

Built in c.1862 for Adam Lobell, the house is a one-story frame cottage in French Creole style. It remained property of the Lobell family for three generations until it was sold to Robert and Florita Denny. Despite a certain number of alterations, the house retains its historic integrity.

The house was listed on the National Register of Historic Places on May 14, 1992.

== See also ==
- National Register of Historic Places listings in Livingston Parish, Louisiana
