= Port Vincent, Louisiana =

Village of Port Vincent
- Village
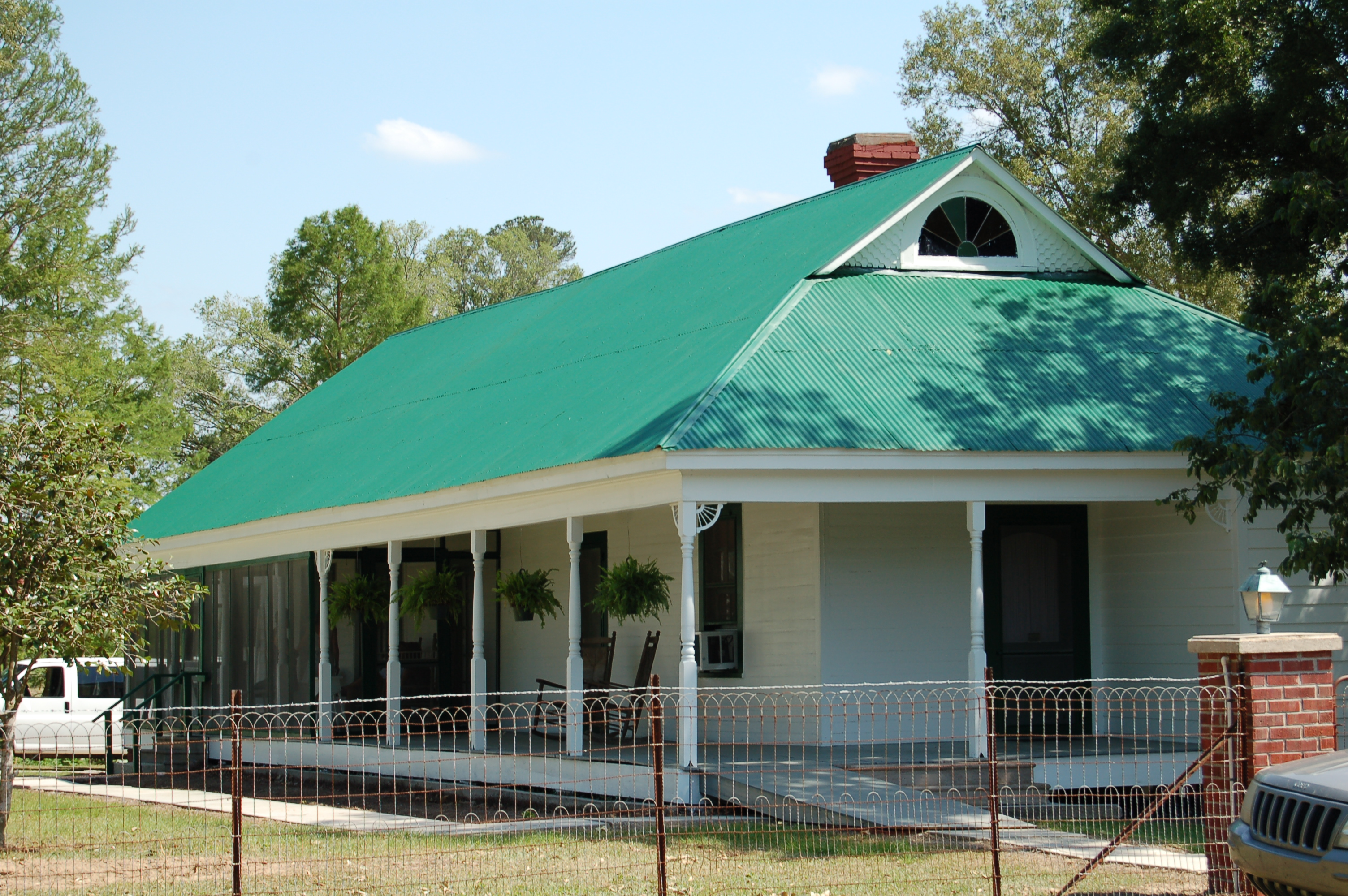
- Castleberry Boarding House in Port Vincent.

- Location of Port Vincent in Livingston Parish, Louisiana.

- Location of Louisiana in the United States
- Coordinates: 30°20′14″N 90°50′31″W
- Country: United States
- State: Louisiana
- Parish: Livingston
- Incorporated: May 5, 1952

Government
  - Mayor: Angela Elmore

Area
  - Total: 1.75 sq mi (4.52 km^{2})
  - Land: 1.70 sq mi (4.41 km^{2})
  - Water: 0.042 sq mi (0.11 km^{2})
- Elevation: 7 ft (2.1 m)

Population (2020)
  - Total: 646
  - Density: 379.2/sq mi (146.41/km^{2})
- Time zone: UTC-6 (CST)
  - Summer (DST): UTC-5 (CDT)
- Area code: 225
- FIPS code: 22-62105
- Website: portvincent-la.gov

Port Vincent is a village in Livingston Parish, Louisiana, United States. As of the 2020 census, Port Vincent had a population of 646. It is part of the Baton Rouge Metropolitan Statistical Area.

== Geography ==
Port Vincent is located at 30°20′14″N 90°50′31″W (30.337250, -90.841927). According to the United States Census Bureau, the village has a total area of 1.7 square miles (4.4 km^{2}), of which 1.6 square miles (4.3 km^{2}) is land and 0.04 square mile (0.1 km^{2}) (2.37%) is water.

== Demographics ==
Historical population
Census	Pop.	Note	%±
1960	340		—
1970	387		13.8%
1980	450		16.3%
1990	446		−0.9%
2000	463		3.8%
2010	741		60.0%
2020	646		−12.8%
2025 (est.)	709	▲	9.8%
U.S. Decennial Census

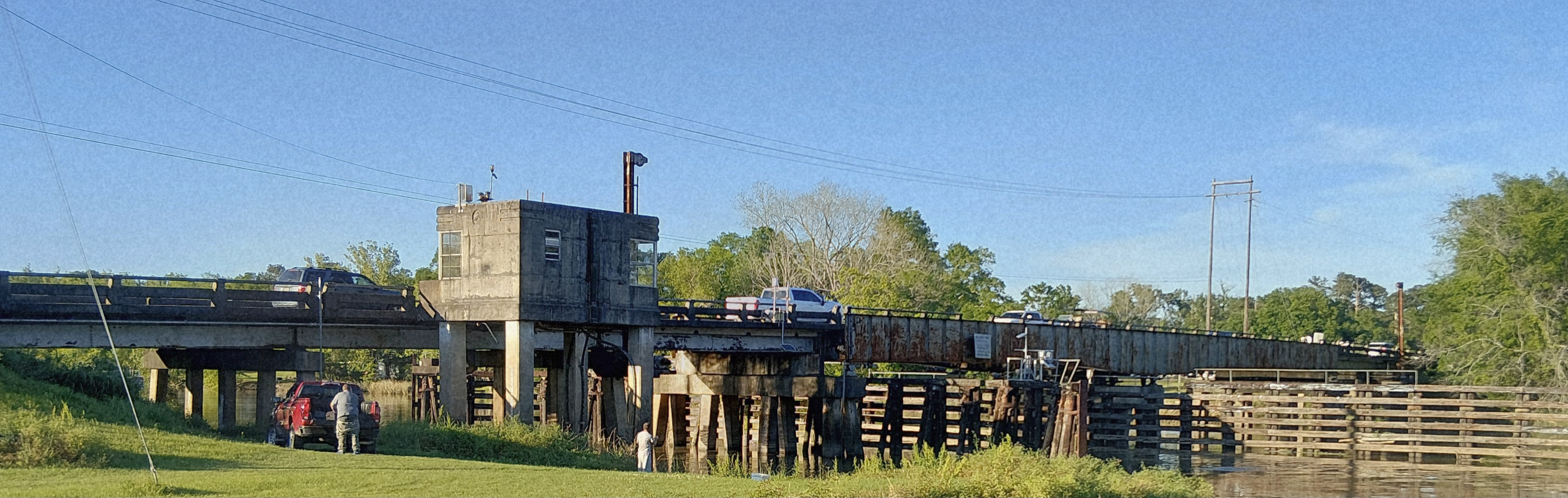
Highway 42 bridge where it crosses the Amite River at Port Vincent, Louisiana

As of the census of 2000, there were 463 people, 192 households, and 134 families residing in the village. The population density was 280.3 inhabitants per square mile (108.2/km^{2}). There were 262 housing units at an average density of 158.6 per square mile (61.2/km^{2}). The racial makeup of the village was 96.11% White, 1.30% African American, 0.86% Native American, 0.43% Asian, and 1.30% from two or more races.

There were 192 households, out of which 27.6% had children under the age of 18 living with them, 59.4% were married couples living together, 5.2% had a female householder with no husband present, and 29.7% were non-families. 24.0% of all households were made up of individuals, and 7.8% had someone living alone who was 65 years of age or older. The average household size was 2.41 and the average family size was 2.89.

In the village, the population was spread out, with 22.7% under the age of 18, 7.3% from 18 to 24, 30.9% from 25 to 44, 28.1% from 45 to 64, and 11.0% who were 65 years of age or older. The median age was 39 years. For every 100 females, there were 112.4 males. For every 100 females age 18 and over, there were 103.4 males.

The median income for a household in the village was $36,250, and the median income for a family was $49,583. Males had a median income of $35,357 versus $27,188 for females. The per capita income for the village was $17,347. About 4.6% of families and 7.9% of the population were below the poverty line, including 9.6% of those under age 18 and 15.0% of those age 65 or over.
