= Walker, Louisiana =

- City
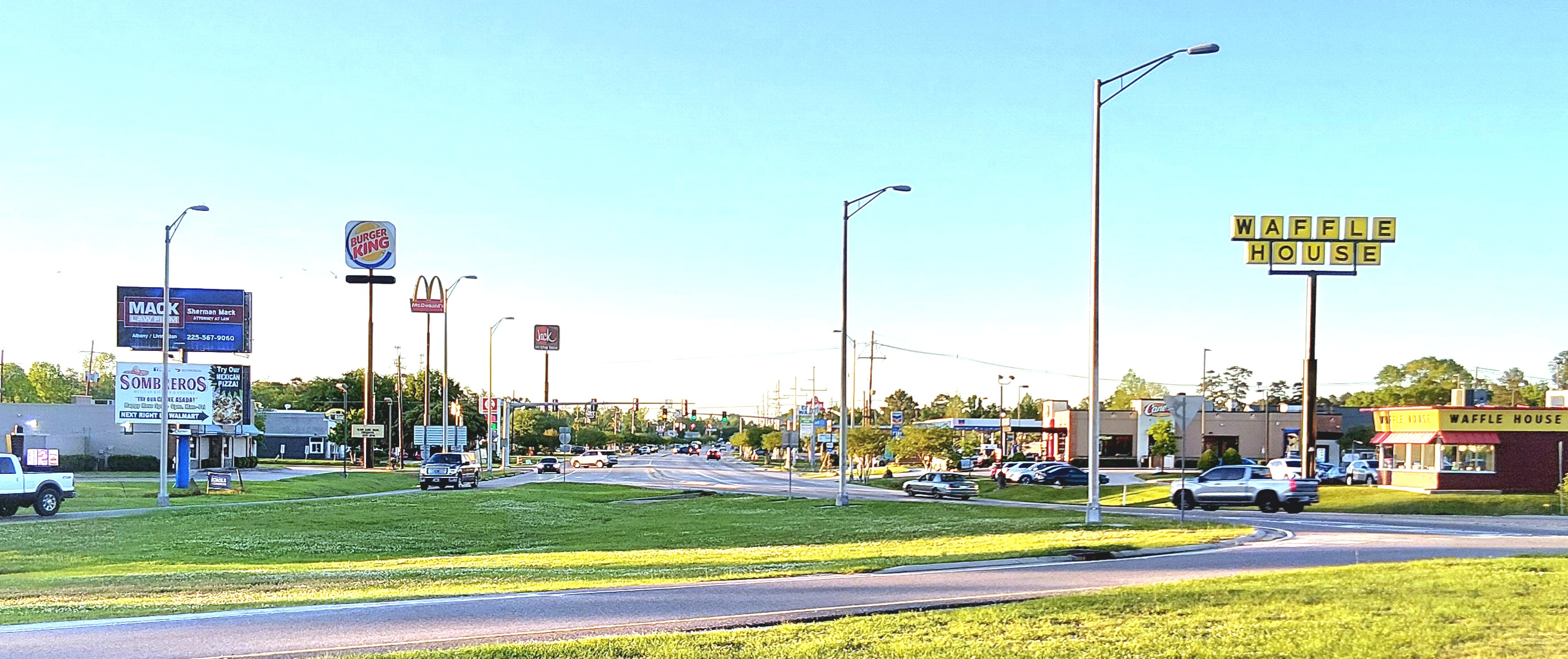
- Walker as seen from Interstate 12
- Nickname: The Pine Tree Capital of the World
- Location of Walker in Livingston Parish, Louisiana.

- Location of Louisiana in the United States
- Coordinates: 30°29′22″N 90°51′46″W
- Country: United States
- State: Louisiana
- Parish: Livingston

Government
  - Mayor: Jimmy Watson
  - Police Chief: David Addison
  - Parish Sheriff: Jason Ard

Area
  - Total: 6.62 sq mi (17.15 km^{2})
  - Land: 6.59 sq mi (17.08 km^{2})
  - Water: 0.027 sq mi (0.07 km^{2})
- Elevation: 46 ft (14 m)

Population (2020)
  - Total: 6,374
  - Density: 966.6/sq mi (373.22/km^{2})
- Time zone: UTC-6 (CST)
  - Summer (DST): UTC-5 (CDT)
- ZIP code: 70785
- Area code: 225
- FIPS code: 22-79240
- Website: Official website

Walker is a city in Livingston Parish, Louisiana, United States. As of the 2020 census the population was placed at 6,374 (up from 6,138 in 2010), making Walker and Denham Springs the only parish municipalities classified as cities.

== History ==
The area now known as Walker was founded by Michael Joseph Milton, Jr. (1795-1863) and “several slaves” in 1825. Michael Milton married in 1832 in Livingston Parish. He and his wife, Martha Clark Milton (1803-1878) developed 343 acres from a Land Grant for his service in the War of 1812. The Milton family was a pioneering family from North Carolina and a first family in Virginia who settled in an area in Alabama, and in Florida before establishing the new community in the piney woods east of the Amite River and Denham Springs. In this sense, Walker, Louisiana, by virtue of its establishment, traces its roots to the founding of the nation in Jamestown, Virginia. The Federal government recognized the growth of the settlement and opened a post office as Milton Old Field in 1856. The "Old Field" part of the original name referred to the open, cleared land that was suitable for grazing cattle and early community gatherings after the Miltons settled there. Michael Milton was appointed as postmaster in 1858. In 1890, the post office was renamed after Dr. William Elliott Walker, M.D., a legislator from nearby Springfield, who had also served as a lieutenant colonel in the Confederate States of America.

Walker became a city in 2011, by proclamation of Louisiana Governor Bobby Jindal.

== Geography ==
Walker is located at 30°29′22″N 90°51′46″W (30.489423, -90.862872). According to the United States Census Bureau, the city has a total area of 5.8 square miles (14.9 km^{2}), all land.

The city is located roughly 20 miles east of Baton Rouge, the Louisiana State Capitol.

== Demographics ==
Walker racial composition as of 2020
Race	Number	Percentage
White (non-Hispanic)	4,987	78.24%
Black or African American (non-Hispanic)	710	11.14%
Native American	9	0.14%
Asian	96	1.51%
Pacific Islander	5	0.08%
Other/Mixed	277	4.35%
Hispanic or Latino	290	4.55%

As of the 2020 United States census, there were 6,374 people, 2,449 households, and 1,557 families residing in the city.

According to the 2010 census, there were 6,138 people, 2,297 households, and 1,693 families residing in the city. The racial makeup of the city was 85.2% White, 10.8% African American, 0.3% Native American, 0.07% Asian, 1.6% from other races, and 1.4% from two or more races. Hispanic or Latino of any race were 2.9% of the population.

According to the 2000 census, the population density was 834.8 inhabitants per square mile (322.3/km^{2}). There were 1,905 housing units at an average density of 331.2 per square mile (127.9/km^{2}). There were 1,758 households, out of which 39.6% had children under the age of 18 living with them, 59.4% were married couples living together, 11.1% had a female householder with no husband present, and 24.9% were non-families. 21.3% of all households were made up of individuals, and 8.5% had someone living alone who was 65 years of age or older. The average household size was 2.73 and the average family size was 3.18.

In the town the population was spread out, with 29.8% under the age of 18, 9.7% from 18 to 24, 31.4% from 25 to 44, 19.5% from 45 to 64, and 9.6% who were 65 years of age or older. The median age was 32 years. For every 100 females, there were 97.9 males. For every 100 females age 18 and over, there were 91.6 males. The median income for a household in the town was $38,298, and the median income for a family was $43,750. Males had a median income of $32,907 versus $21,775 for females. The per capita income for the town was $16,056. About 5.9% of families and 9.6% of the population were below the poverty line, including 5.8% of those under age 18 and 20.6% of those age 65 or over.

== Education ==
Walker is within the Livingston Parish Public Schools and includes Walker High School.

The Livingston Parish Literacy and Technology Center in Walker is named for Sally Clausen, former Louisiana commissioner of education, and her brother, Thomas G. Clausen, state education superintendent from 1984 to 1988.

== Notable people ==
- Jefferson D. Hughes, III, associate justice of the Louisiana Supreme Court since 2013, Walker resident
- Mike DeJean, Former Major League Pitcher, grew up in Walker and graduated from Walker High School.
- Julie Cantrell, editor and best-selling novelist, attended K-12 in Walker.
- Brian Thomas Jr., American football wide receiver for the LSU Tigers
