= Springfield, Louisiana =

- Town
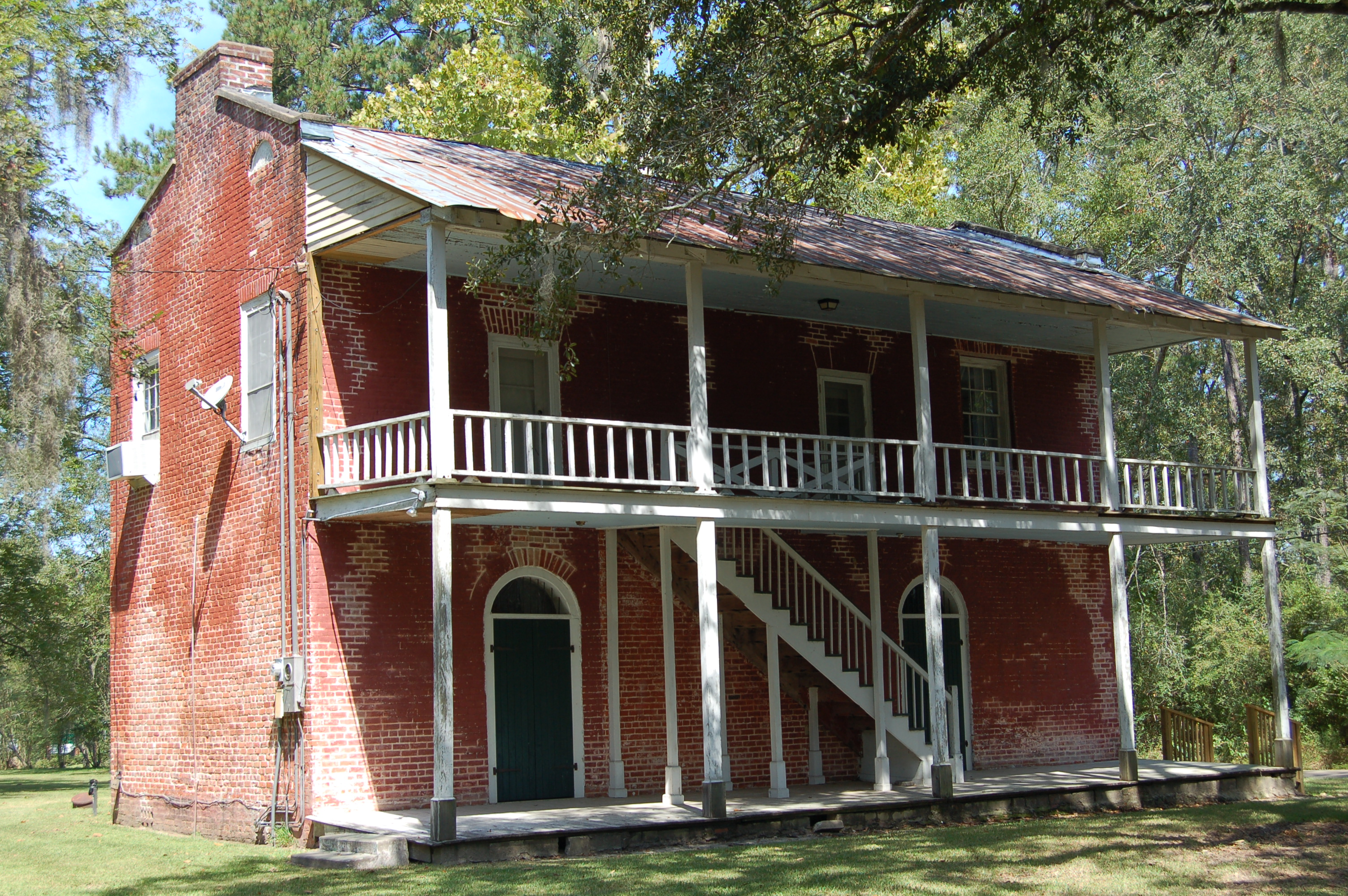
- Old Livingston Parish Courthouse in Springfield

- Location of Springfield in Livingston Parish, Louisiana.

- Location of Louisiana in the United States
- Coordinates: 30°25′45″N 90°32′53″W
- Country: United States
- State: Louisiana
- Parish: Livingston

Area
  - Total: 1.41 sq mi (3.64 km^{2})
  - Land: 1.41 sq mi (3.64 km^{2})
  - Water: 0 sq mi (0.00 km^{2})
- Elevation: 16 ft (4.9 m)

Population (2020)
  - Total: 427
  - Density: 304.0/sq mi (117.36/km^{2})
- Time zone: UTC-6 (CST)
  - Summer (DST): UTC-5 (CDT)
- Area code: 225
- FIPS code: 22-72415
- Website: www.townofspringfield.org

Springfield is a town in Livingston Parish, Louisiana, United States. The population was 427 as of the 2020 census. It is part of the Baton Rouge metropolitan statistical area.

== History ==
Springfield began in the 18th century at one of the northernmost points considered to be navigable on the Natalbany River. Between Springfield and Lake Maurepas, Ponchatoula Creek joins the Natalbany and increases its flow. The town was also connected to the Natchez Trace.

Via the Natalbany, Lake Maurepas, Lake Pontchartrain, and Bayou Saint John, Springfield had access to New Orleans by water. Similarly, at the time (prior to the damming of the channel by levees) along the Amite River and Mississippi River, Bayou Manchac provided shallow-water access between Springfield and Baton Rouge. By 1810 Springfield was one of the areas of interest in the rebellion against Spain, which produced the short-lived Republic of West Florida. Bricks from an old Spanish fort can still be found, roughly 200 yards in front of today's post office. At this time the area was part of St. Helena Parish, with Livingston Parish created in 1832 from the southern portion of St. Helena.

Springfield served as the Livingston parish seat from 1835 to 1872. The town was incorporated in 1838. A post office was listed in Springfield, Livingston County (Parish), on October 1, 1846, with Jacob P. Randolph as the postmaster.

In the early part of the 19th century, Peter av Hammerdal (Peter Hammond), eponym of Hammond, Louisiana, came to do business of transporting lumber and other products for ocean-going ships in New Orleans, via the rivers and lakes south of Springfield.

The Springfield city fathers, fearing a lawless element, declined to allow a railway track to be laid from New Orleans through Springfield and then north. (This decision gave birth to Ponchatoula, Hammond, Amite, and other towns.) The 1854 completion of the New Orleans, Jackson & Great Northern Railroad (now the Canadian National Railway)—which went through Hammond, Ponchatoula, and Manchac—bypassed Springfield and deprived it of a logistical role.

When Tangipahoa Parish was formed partly from Livingston Parish in 1868, Springfield was no longer a central location in Livingston Parish. It sat along the new boundary between Livingston and Tangipahoa Parishes. Today's seat of government for Livingston Parish is the city of Livingston.

== Geography ==
According to the United States Census Bureau, the town has a total area of 1.4 square miles (3.6 km^{2}), all land.

The town's name is derived from the numerous artesian springs in the area.

== Demographics ==
Historical population
Census	Pop.	Note	%±
1880	99		—
1960	268		—
1970	423		57.8%
1980	424		0.2%
1990	439		3.5%
2000	395		−10.0%
2010	487		23.3%
2020	427		−12.3%
2025 (est.)	463	▲	8.4%
U.S. Decennial Census

As of the census of 2000, there were 395 people, 162 households, and 115 families residing in the town. The population density was 282.4 inhabitants per square mile (109.0/km^{2}). There were 185 housing units at an average density of 132.3 per square mile (51.1/km^{2}). The racial makeup of the town was 96.20% White, 2.03% African American, 0.25% Asian, and 1.52% from two or more races.

There were 162 households, out of which 27.8% had children under the age of 18 living with them, 51.9% were married couples living together, 12.3% had a female householder with no husband present, and 28.4% were non-families. 25.9% of all households were made up of individuals, and 11.1% had someone living alone who was 65 years of age or older. The average household size was 2.44 and the average family size was 2.90.

In the town, the population was spread out, with 23.5% under the age of 18, 8.1% from 18 to 24, 24.1% from 25 to 44, 28.4% from 45 to 64, and 15.9% who were 65 years of age or older. The median age was 41 years. For every 100 females, there were 101.5 males. For every 100 females age 18 and over, there were 89.9 males.

The median income for a household in the town was $28,125, and the median income for a family was $48,750. Males had a median income of $35,536 versus $21,667 for females. The per capita income for the town was $17,075. About 19.0% of families and 20.8% of the population were below the poverty line, including 35.2% of those under age 18 and 15.6% of those age 65 or over.

== Education ==
Springfield is within the Livingston Parish Public Schools system.

Schools include Springfield Elementary School, Springfield Middle School, and Springfield High School.

St. John's University was based in Springfield before closing in 2005.
