= Horse Bluff Landing, Louisiana =

- Unincorporated community
- Location within Louisiana Location within the United States
- Coordinates: 30°21′58″N 90°37′38″W
- Country: United States
- State: Louisiana
- Parish: Livingston
- Elevation: 10 ft (3.0 m)
- Time zone: UTC-6 (Central (CST))
  - Summer (DST): UTC-5 (CDT)
- ZIP code: 70462
- Area code: 225
- GNIS feature ID: 535799
- FIPS code: 22-36060

Horse Bluff Landing is an unincorporated community in Livingston Parish, Louisiana, United States. The community is located less than 3 miles (4.8 kilometres) west of Killian and 5 miles (8.0 kilometres) northeast of Maurepas on the bank of Tickfaw River. The Tickfaw State Park is located 1 mile (1.6 kilometres) to the northwest across the Tickfaw River.

== Redding cemetery ==
An early 19th century cemetery is located at Horse Bluff Landing with ten graves total and eight unmarked graves. The cemetery is named after the Redding family, early pioneers that settled in the area.
