= Louisiana Highway 22 =

State highway in Louisiana, United States

Louisiana Highway 22

- Route of LA 22 highlighted in red

Route information
- Maintained by Louisiana DOTD
- Length: 71.147 mi (114.500 km)
- Existed: 1955 renumbering–present
- Tourist routes: Louisiana Scenic Byway; Southern Swamps Byway

Major junctions
- West end: LA 75 / LA 942 in Darrow
- LA 44 in Burnside; LA 70 in Sorrento; I-10 in Sorrento; US 61 in Sorrento; LA 16 south of French Settlement; LA 42 in Springfield; I-55 / US 51 in Ponchatoula; LA 21 in Madisonville
- East end: US 190 in Mandeville

Location
- Country: United States
- State: Louisiana
- Parishes: Ascension, Livingston, Tangipahoa, St. Tammany

Highway system
- Louisiana State Highway System; Interstate; US; State; Scenic
← LA 21	→ LA 23

Louisiana Highway 22 (LA 22) is a state highway located in southeastern Louisiana. It runs 71.15 miles (114.50 km) in a general east–west direction from the junction of LA 75 and LA 942 in Darrow to U.S. Highway 190 (US 190) in Mandeville.

The route traverses a variety of terrain and surroundings over the course of its journey, which begins at the Mississippi River in rural Ascension Parish. It also crosses several navigable waterways with movable bridges spanning two of them: the Amite River and Tchefuncte River. After crossing both Interstate 10 (I-10) and US 61 in Sorrento, LA 22 winds through a cypress swamp in Livingston Parish west of Lake Maurepas.

Near the town of Springfield, the highway enters the thick pine forest characterizing the north shore of Lake Pontchartrain and intersects the concurrent I-55/US 51 in Ponchatoula. On its east end, LA 22 becomes a heavily traveled residential and commercial corridor in suburban St. Tammany Parish between Madisonville and Mandeville. This stretch runs south of the parallel I-12 corridor and feeds traffic onto US 190 and the Lake Pontchartrain Causeway to the New Orleans area.

LA 22 was designated in the 1955 Louisiana Highway renumbering, replacing portions of five shorter former routes. These included State Route 761, State Route 54, State Route 160, State Route 122, and State Route 465. In its early years, LA 22 extended across the Mississippi River by ferry to Donaldsonville prior to the existence of the nearby Sunshine Bridge. The route was also much shorter on its eastern end, terminating at a junction with US 51 and US 190 in Ponchatoula until the latter was re-routed through Covington.

== Route description ==
=== Darrow to Sorrento ===
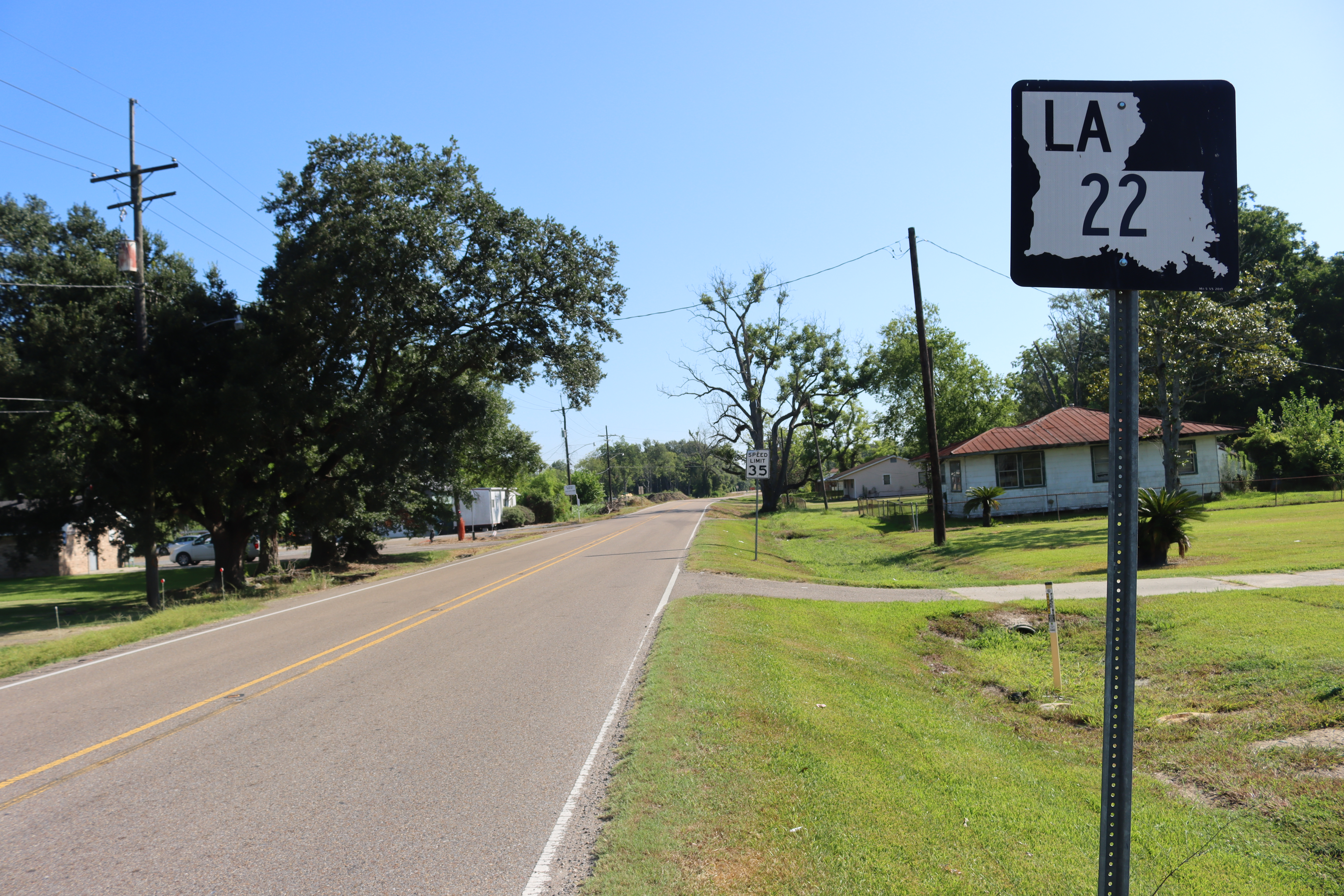
LA 22 eastbound at its western terminus in Darrow, LA

From the west, LA 22 begins at a junction with LA 75 and LA 942 at the east bank levee of the Mississippi River opposite the city of Donaldsonville. The route heads northeast from the small Ascension Parish community of Darrow as an undivided two-lane highway, traveling through Hillaryville across the Canadian National Railway (CN) line and to the rear of Houmas House Plantation and Gardens. In Burnside, LA 22 intersects LA 44 and passes through a growing suburban area amidst the rural surroundings.

Entering the town of Sorrento, the highway intersects LA 70, which leads across the Sunshine Bridge to Donaldsonville. Shortly afterward, LA 22 widens to a divided four-lane highway and passes through a diamond interchange with I-10 at exit 182, connecting with Baton Rouge and New Orleans. LA 22 continues along John Leblanc Boulevard, which largely bypasses the populated portion of the town. The highway crosses the Kansas City Southern Railway (KCS) line, followed closely by US 61 (Airline Highway), which parallels the interstate between the aforementioned cities.

=== Sorrento to Lake Maurepas swamp ===
Narrowing back to two-lane capacity, LA 22 proceeds north from Sorrento to a T-intersection with LA 429 just east of St. Amant. It then turns due east briefly through an area known as Acy. Resuming its northeastern trajectory, LA 22 begins to wind its way through the swampland that surrounds Lake Maurepas. The highway crosses a bridge over the wide Amite River Diversion Canal, which is lined by boat houses and fishing camps.

Continuing into Livingston Parish, LA 22 turns eastward at a T-intersection marking the terminus of LA 16 south of French Settlement. LA 16 leads to Denham Springs and Walker, the most populated areas of the parish, located along I-12. LA 22 follows a serpentine path through several small communities along the Amite River, such as Head of Island, Whitehall, and Maurepas. Curving again to the northeast, LA 22 crosses the river via swing bridge and passes through Killian, located at a junction with LA 444. The route then proceeds across a higher and longer bridge spanning the Tickfaw River, allowing a splendid view of the surrounding cypress swamp.

=== Springfield and Ponchatoula ===
Entering the small town of Springfield, LA 22 turns northwest briefly at a T-intersection with LA 1037 (Collum Road). The two routes proceed along the town's main street in a wrong-way concurrency until reaching Walnut Street. From this four-way intersection, LA 1037 turns west toward Tickfaw State Park, LA 42 begins and proceeds along the main street, while LA 22 turns east across the Natalbany River into Tangipahoa Parish.

Immediately across the parish line, LA 22 intersects LA 1249, which heads north through Pumpkin Center to a junction with I-12. For the remainder of its journey, LA 22 travels about two to three miles (3.2 to 4.8 km) to the south of I-12, the main east–west highway through the Florida Parishes on the north shore of Lake Pontchartrain. With the terrain having transitioned from swampland to pine forest, the surroundings become more consistently populated as LA 22 heads into the small city of Ponchatoula. On the outskirts of town, LA 22 widens to four lanes as it passes through a full cloverleaf interchange with the concurrent I-55/US 51, connecting with the larger nearby city of Hammond, as well as New Orleans.

Just east of the interchange, LA 22 begins a concurrency with US 51 Bus. opposite Ponchatoula Cemetery and gains a center turning lane for a short distance. After traveling several blocks on Pine Street through the historic commercial section of town, US 51 Bus. turns off to the south along the CNRR tracks. East of Ponchatoula, LA 22 resumes as a two-lane highway through the thick pine woods for 10 miles (16 km) before crossing into St. Tammany Parish at Bedico. During this stretch, the highway crosses the Tangipahoa River and intersects LA 445, another connection to I-12.

=== St. Tammany Parish ===
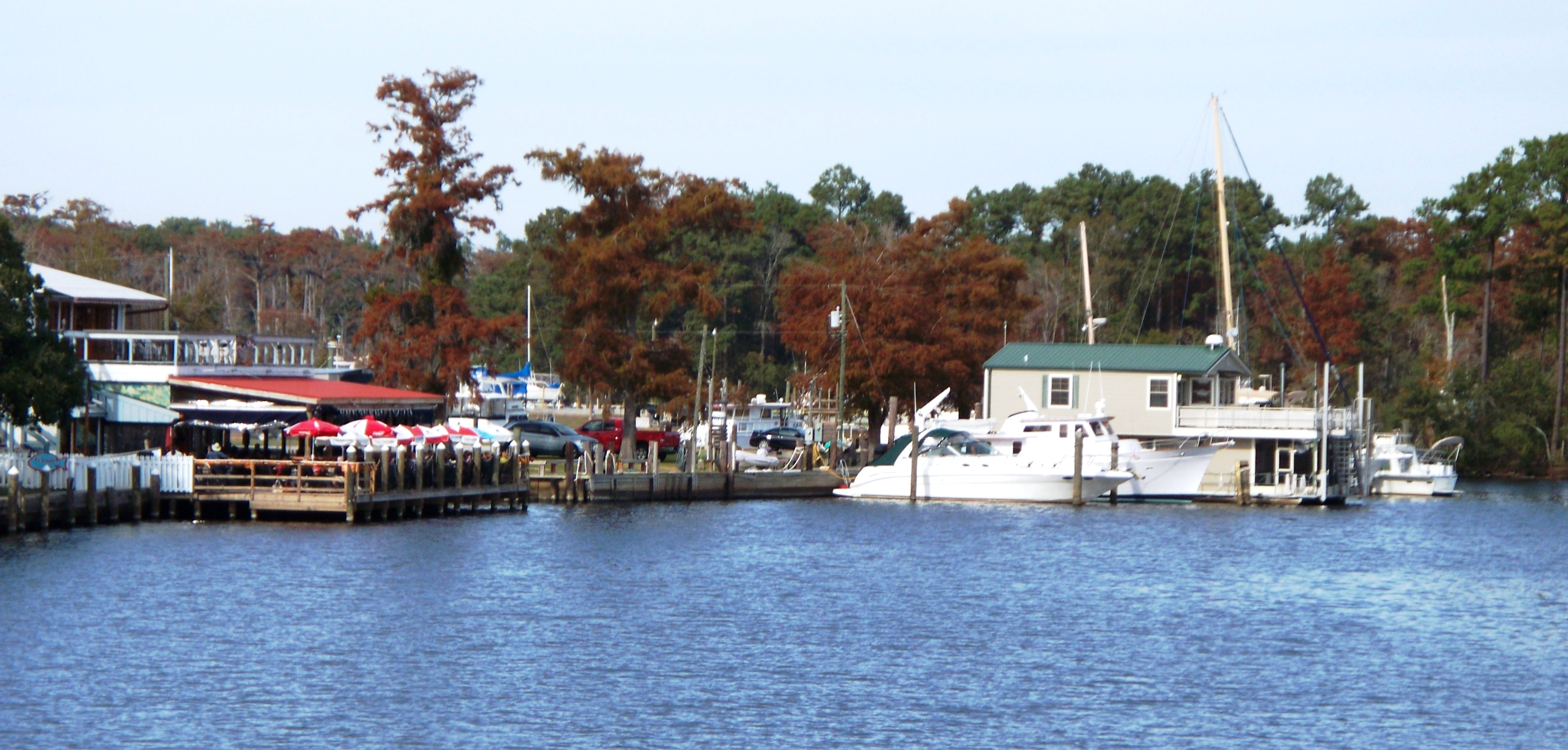
Madisonville's colorful waterfront, looking north from the swing bridge on LA 22, features outdoor dining along the Tchefuncte River.

Curving slightly to the southeast, LA 22 heads into the small town of Madisonville, where it becomes known as Mulberry Street. The route crosses LA 21 and LA 1077 at a four-way intersection with Main Street, which leads north toward Covington and south alongside the Tchefuncte River to the shore of Lake Pontchartrain and the Lake Pontchartrain Basin Maritime Museum. LA 22 crosses the river by way of a second swing bridge, providing views of several upscale houses on the water. Groves of ancient live oak trees line the roadway as it passes briefly through Fairview-Riverside State Park. LA 22 then becomes lined with residential subdivisions and commercial shopping strips as it enters the city of Mandeville. For this stretch, the roadway widens to accommodate an extra travel lane for westbound traffic only, as well as a center turning lane.

A divided four-lane thoroughfare known as West Causeway Approach branches off of LA 22 and provides access to several area schools and more residential subdivisions. It also acts as a long ramp to the Lake Pontchartrain Causeway, a 24-mile-long (39 km) toll bridge to the New Orleans area. LA 22 proceeds about one mile (1.6 km) further to its eastern terminus at a diamond interchange with US 190 and North Causeway Boulevard. From this interchange, US 190 heads north on a four-lane freeway alignment toward Covington and straight ahead (east) as a four-lane boulevard through Mandeville. North Causeway Boulevard continues the freeway southward as the main route to the Lake Pontchartrain Causeway.

=== Route classification and data ===
LA 22 has several different classifications over the course of its route, as determined by the Louisiana Department of Transportation and Development (La DOTD). More than half of the route is classified as a rural major collector, including two large portions from Acy to Springfield and from Ponchatoula to Madisonville. The remainder generally alternates between an urban collector and an urban minor arterial, with the exception of the western portion of the route between Darrow and Sorrento, which is classified as a rural minor collector.

Daily traffic volume in 2013 peaked at 27,200 vehicles through the suburban and commercial corridor between Madisonville and Mandeville. High counts were also reported near the I-10 and I-55 interchanges in Sorrento and Ponchatoula, respectively. The lowest numbers occurred along the lightly populated stretch in Livingston Parish southwest of Killian with 1,700 vehicles daily. The posted speed limit is 55 mph (90 km/h) for most of the route but is reduced as low as 25 or 35 mph (40 or 55 km/h) through town.

The entirety of LA 22 from Sorrento to Ponchatoula is part of the Southern Swamps Byway in the state-designated system of tourist routes known as the Louisiana Scenic Byways.

== History ==
In the original Louisiana Highway system in use between 1921 and 1955, LA 22 was part of five shorter routes: State Route 761 from Darrow through Burnside; State Route 54 through Sorrento; State Route 160 to Springfield; State Route 122 to Madisonville; and State Route 465 to Mandeville.

These highways were joined together under the single designation of LA 22 when the Louisiana Department of Highways renumbered the state highway system in 1955.

Class "A": La 22—From a junction with La 1 at or near Donaldsonville through or near Darrow to a junction with La-US 61 at or near Sorrento.
Class "B": La 22—From a junction with La-US 61 at or near Sorrento through or near Acy, Maurepas and Springfield to a junction with La-US 51 at or near Ponchatoula.

— 1955 legislative route description

With the 1955 renumbering, the state highway department initially categorized all routes into three classes: "A" (primary), "B" (secondary), and "C" (farm-to-market). This system has since been updated and replaced by a more specific functional classification system.

As the above description indicates, the route initially had different termini. On its western end, LA 22 once crossed the Mississippi River by ferry between Darrow and Donaldsonville and continued along what is now LA 18 to its junction with LA 1. However, the ferry service was discontinued in 1966 after the Sunshine Bridge was completed just downriver from Donaldsonville. (Note: The Sunshine Bridge was opened on October 12, 1964, and the agreement to discontinue the ferry service was made exactly one year later. The west bank portion of LA 22 in Donaldsonville became LA 18 Bypass until becoming part of the mainline route in 1988.) On its eastern end, LA 22 originally terminated in Ponchatoula since the highway extending from there to Mandeville was temporarily part of US 190 at the time of the 1955 renumbering. (Note: In 1951, US 190 was re-routed onto the present LA 22 between Ponchatoula and Mandeville, moving the route out of downtown Covington. When this was reversed in 1956, LA 22 was extended and LA 36 was shortened to accommodate the change.) When US 190 was returned to its regular route through Covington the following year, LA 22 was extended to its current terminus at Chinchuba, an area now within the Mandeville city limits. The actual terminus was a simple Y-intersection at what is now LA 3228 (Asbury Drive) until the present diamond interchange aligned with North Causeway Boulevard was constructed in 1981.

Several small realignments to the roadway over the years have resulted from the replacement of bridges across three rivers in Livingston Parish. The first was a new bridge across the Natalbany River at Springfield in 1956. About this same time, two 90-degree turns were eliminated as the route was straightened coming into town from the south. In 1974, the current Amite River span was constructed, and most recently, the Tickfaw River bridge was replaced in 2000. In all three cases, portions of the original bridge approaches survive as dead-end local roads, although the bridges themselves have been removed. The only other significant realignment to LA 22 occurred in 1990 when Sorrento's Main Street was bypassed by a new four-lane alignment (John Leblanc Boulevard) that facilitated traffic between I-10 and US 61. This included the construction of a twin-span bridge across a small waterway known as Bayou Conway.

== Future ==
La DOTD is currently engaged in a program that aims to transfer about 5,000 miles (8,000 km) of state-owned roadways to local governments over the next several years. Under this plan of "right-sizing" the state highway system, two portions of LA 22 are proposed for deletion as they no longer meet a significant interurban travel function. These consist of the westernmost section of the route between Darrow and LA 70 in Sorrento and the section between LA 16 and Killian.

== Major intersections ==
Parish	Location	mi	km	Destinations	Notes
Ascension	Darrow	0.000	0.000	LA 75 / LA 942 (River Road) – Geismar, Carville	Western terminus of LA 22 and LA 942; eastern terminus of LA 75
Ascension	Burnside	4.452	7.165	LA 44 – Gonzales	
Ascension	Sorrento	7.413	11.930	LA 70 – Sunshine Bridge, Donaldsonville	Eastern terminus of LA 70
Ascension	Sorrento	7.747– 7.944	12.468– 12.785	I-10 – Baton Rouge, New Orleans	Exit 182 on I-10
Ascension	Sorrento	9.750– 9.760	15.691– 15.707	US 61 (Airline Highway) – Gonzales, New Orleans	
Ascension		11.156	17.954	LA 936	Western terminus of LA 936
Ascension		11.897	19.146	LA 429 – St. Amant	Eastern terminus of LA 429
Ascension		12.242	19.702	LA 935 (Stringer Bridge Road)	Southeastern terminus of LA 935
Ascension	Acy	13.230	21.292	LA 936	Eastern terminus of LA 936
Ascension		14.452	23.258	LA 937	Eastern terminus of LA 937
Ascension–Livingston parish line		17.445– 17.537	28.075– 28.223	Bridge over Amite River Diversion Canal / Bayou Pierre	
Livingston	Head of Island	18.373	29.568	LA 16 north – French Settlement	Western terminus of LA 16
Livingston	Maurepas	28.984	46.645	LA 1039 south (Bear Island Road)	Northern terminus of LA 1039
Livingston		31.630– 31.729	50.904– 51.063	Bridge over Amite River	
Livingston	Killian	35.762– 35.954	57.553– 57.862	LA 444 west – French Settlement	Eastern terminus of LA 444
Livingston		38.066– 38.759	61.261– 62.377	Bridge over Tickfaw River	
Livingston	Springfield	42.030	67.641	LA 1037 east (Collum Road)	West end (geographically east end) of LA 1037 concurrency
Livingston	Springfield	42.286	68.053	LA 1038 west (Carter Cemetery Road)	Eastern terminus of LA 1038
Livingston	Springfield	42.415	68.260	LA 42 west (Main Street) – Albany LA 1037 west (Walnut Street)	Eastern terminus of LA 42; east end (geographically west end) of LA 1037 concurrency; to Tickfaw State Park
Livingston–Tangipahoa parish line	Springfield	42.495– 42.589	68.389– 68.540	Bridge over Natalbany River	
Tangipahoa		42.957	69.133	LA 1249 north (Pumpkin Center Road) to I-12 – Pumpkin Center	Southern terminus of LA 1249
Tangipahoa	Ponchatoula	47.704– 48.029	76.772– 77.295	I-55 / US 51 – Hammond, New Orleans	Exit 26 on I-55/US 51
Tangipahoa	Ponchatoula	48.118	77.438	US 51 Bus. north	West end of US 51 Bus. concurrency
Tangipahoa	Ponchatoula	49.008	78.871	US 51 Bus. south (Southwest Railroad Avenue) to I-55	East end of US 51 Bus. concurrency
Tangipahoa		55.481– 55.578	89.288– 89.444	Bridge over Tangipahoa River	
Tangipahoa		56.921	91.605	LA 445 north to I-12	Southern terminus of LA 445
St. Tammany		61.714	99.319	LA 1085 north	Southern terminus of LA 1085
St. Tammany	Madisonville	66.834	107.559	LA 21 north / LA 1077 (Main Street) to I-12	Southern terminus of LA 21
St. Tammany	Madisonville	66.909– 67.009	107.680– 107.841	Bridge over Tchefuncte River	
St. Tammany	Mandeville	71.071– 71.147	114.378– 114.500	US 190 – Mandeville, Covington; North Causeway Boulevard – New Orleans via Lake Pontchartrain Causeway	Eastern terminus; interchange
1.000 mi = 1.609 km; 1.000 km = 0.621 mi: Concurrency terminus
