= Head of Island, Louisiana =

Unincorporated settlement in Louisiana

- Unincorporated community
- Location within Louisiana Location within the United States
- Coordinates: 30°16′11″N 90°45′12″W
- Country: United States
- State: Louisiana
- Parish: Livingston
- Elevation: 3 ft (0.91 m)
- Time zone: UTC-6 (Central (CST))
  - Summer (DST): UTC-5 (CDT)
- ZIP code: 70449
- Area code: 225
- GNIS feature ID: 543284
- FIPS code: 22-33595

Head of Island is an unincorporated community in Livingston Parish, Louisiana, United States. The community is located on Louisiana Highway 22, 5 miles (8.0 kilometres) west of Maurepas and 5 miles (8.0 kilometres) southeast of French Settlement south of the Amite River.

== Amite River Diversion Canal ==
In May 2019 the U.S. Army Corps of Engineers began approving permits for clearing debris, trees and growth from the coastal waterways at Head of Island. The coastal restoration projects received partial funding from the Gulf of Mexico Energy Security Act.
