= Tickfaw =

Tickfaw is a place name of Choctaw language origin. Tickfaw may refer to:

- Tickfaw, Louisiana
- Tickfaw State Park
- Tickfaw River
