= Satsuma, Louisiana =

- Unincorporated community
- Location in Louisiana Location in the United States
- Coordinates: 30°30′10″N 90°48′01″W
- Country: United States
- State: Louisiana
- Parish: Livingston
- Elevation: 46 ft (14 m)
- Time zone: UTC-6 (CST)
  - Summer (DST): UTC-5 (CDT)
- Area code: 225

Satsuma is an unincorporated community in Livingston Parish, Louisiana, United States. It owes its origin to the US Post Office Department rule which does not permit two post offices in the same state to have the same name. Satsuma is located on U.S. Route 190 between Walker and Livingston, and its original name was Stafford.

The Satsuma community was first given the name Stafford by the Baton Rouge, Hammond & Eastern Railroad Company when the company established a station there when the line was completed in 1908. The station was probably named after one of the members of the Stafford family, if the railroad followed its policy of naming its stations after local families.

The Staffords are an old Livingston Parish family, as is evidenced by the number of Stafford cemeteries. These include the Hiram Stafford Cemetery (Section 15, T6S-R4E), the Stephen Stafford Cemetery in Section 16 of the same township, and a Stafford Cemetery north of Livingston located on land acquired by Wright Stafford in 1862.

Stafford Road is located about two miles north of Satsuma parallel to US Hwy. 190 and connects the Cane Market Road and the North Livingston Road.

Satsuma Post Office was established on February 24, 1911 with Rae E. Penniman as its first postmaster. It was discontinued on October 31, 1938. When it was established, a Stafford Post Office existed in Catahoula Parish, and therefore the Livingston Parish facility could not have used that name.

Since the people at Stafford Station could not name their post office Stafford, they gave it the name Satsuma because a man from the North had a large orchard of satsuma orange trees adjacent to the railroad.
