= Doyle, Louisiana =

- Unincorporated community
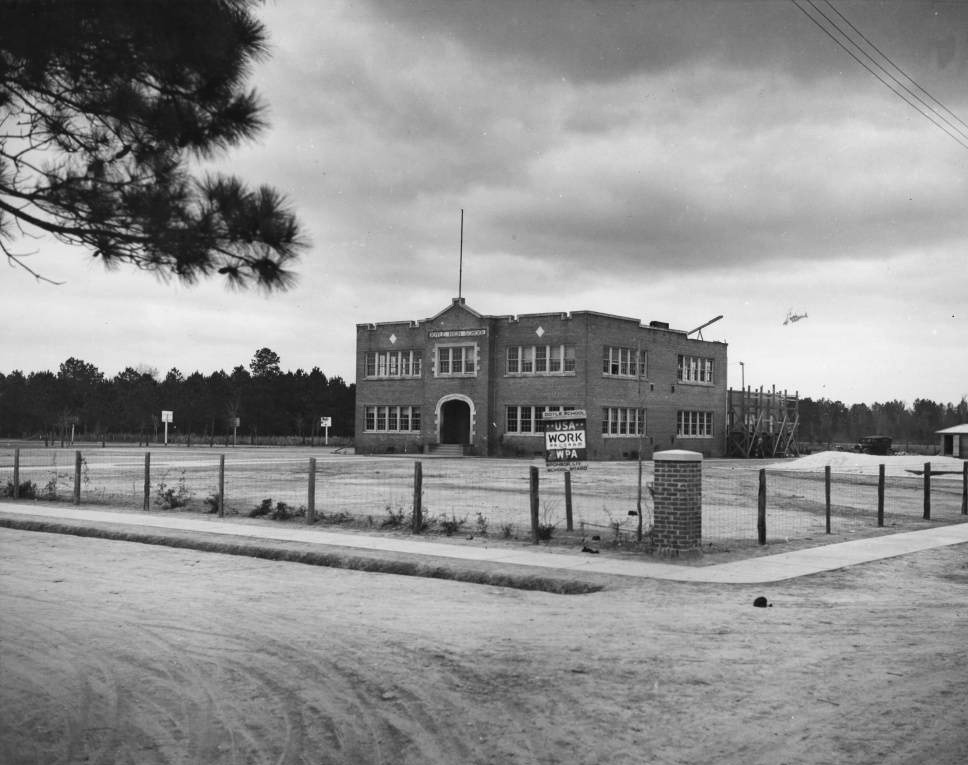
- Doyle High School being improved by the Works Progress Administration, 1937

- Location within Louisiana Location within the United States
- Coordinates: 30°30′13″N 90°44′20″W
- Country: United States
- State: Louisiana
- Parish: Livingston
- Elevation: 46 ft (14 m)
- Time zone: UTC-6 (Central (CST))
  - Summer (DST): UTC-5 (CDT)
- ZIP code: 70754
- Area code: 225
- GNIS feature ID: 552011
- FIPS code: 22-21555

Doyle is an unincorporated community in Livingston Parish, Louisiana, United States. The community is located less than 2 miles (3.2 kilometres) east of Livingston and 4 miles (6.4 kilometres) west of Holden less than a mile east from the Doyle High School.

== History ==
Around 1915 the Yazoo and Mississippi Valley Railroad decided to build a line through Livingston Parish. They attempted to purchase hundreds of acres of land for the train depot, railroad station, a coal chute, and several repair sheds. The local land owners refused to sell so the railroad company purchased vacant land west of Doyle. Over many years the railroad depot grew and eventually became what is now known as Livingston, Louisiana and the new town consumed the old village of Doyle. In 1955 the village of Doyle merged with the nearby town of Livingston.
