= Van Buren, Louisiana =

Unincorporated community in Louisiana

- Unincorporated community
- Location within Louisiana Location within the United States
- Coordinates: 30°26′09″N 90°40′19″W
- Country: United States
- State: Louisiana
- Parish: Livingston
- Elevation: 23 ft (7.0 m)
- Time zone: UTC-6 (Central (CST))
  - Summer (DST): UTC-5 (CDT)
- ZIP code: 70454
- Area code: 225
- GNIS feature ID: 552083

Van Buren is an unincorporated community in Livingston Parish, Louisiana, United States. The community is located less than 4 miles (6.4 kilometres) south of Holden and 6 miles (9.7 kilometres) southeast of Livingston near the Tickfaw River.

== History ==
In 1832 the village of Van Buren was designated as the parish seat for all of Livingston Parish. The village served as the administrative center for the parish until 1835 when the seat was moved to Springfield, Louisiana. The name of the community is derived from Martin Van Buren who was serving as the Vice President under Andrew Jackson when the community was founded. Martin Van Buren later became the 8th President of the United States.
