= Bedico, Louisiana =

Unincorporated community in Louisiana

- Unincorporated community
- Location within Louisiana Location within the United States
- Coordinates: 30°26′11″N 90°15′06″W
- Country: United States
- State: Louisiana
- Parish: Tangipahoa
- Elevation: 20 ft (6.1 m)
- Time zone: UTC-6 (Central (CST))
  - Summer (DST): UTC-5 (CDT)
- Area code: 985
- GNIS feature ID: 549618

Bedico is an unincorporated community in Tangipahoa Parish, Louisiana, United States. Bedico is located on Highway 22, 13 mi (20.92 km) miles east of Hammond.

== Etymology ==
There are several competing theories surrounding the origin of the name Bedico. Some linguists have claimed that the name is derived from the Choctaw words Bihi Chito which means Big Mulberry Land in the Choctaw language. In the late 1790s a nobleman named Michael Betancourt seized 270 acres for the Baron of Carondelet which included Bedico Creek and the surrounding area. Some historians have claimed that the community is named after the Bettencourt family, of French Norman origin. A third theory claims that early Spanish Catholic missionaries named the community after the Order of Saint Benedict.
