= Whitehall, Livingston Parish, Louisiana =

Whitehall, Louisiana
- Unincorporated community
- Location in Louisiana Location in the United States
- Coordinates: 30°17′19″N 90°42′1″W
- Country: United States
- State: Louisiana
- Parish: Livingston
- Elevation: 10 ft (3.0 m)
- Time zone: UTC-6 (Central (EST))
  - Summer (DST): UTC-5 (EDT)
- GNIS feature ID: 556409

Whitehall is an unincorporated community located in Livingston Parish, Louisiana, United States. The community is on Louisiana Highway 22 and Maurepas lies approximately two miles to the northeast. The Amite River flows past the northwest side of the community.
