= Sunshine Bridge =

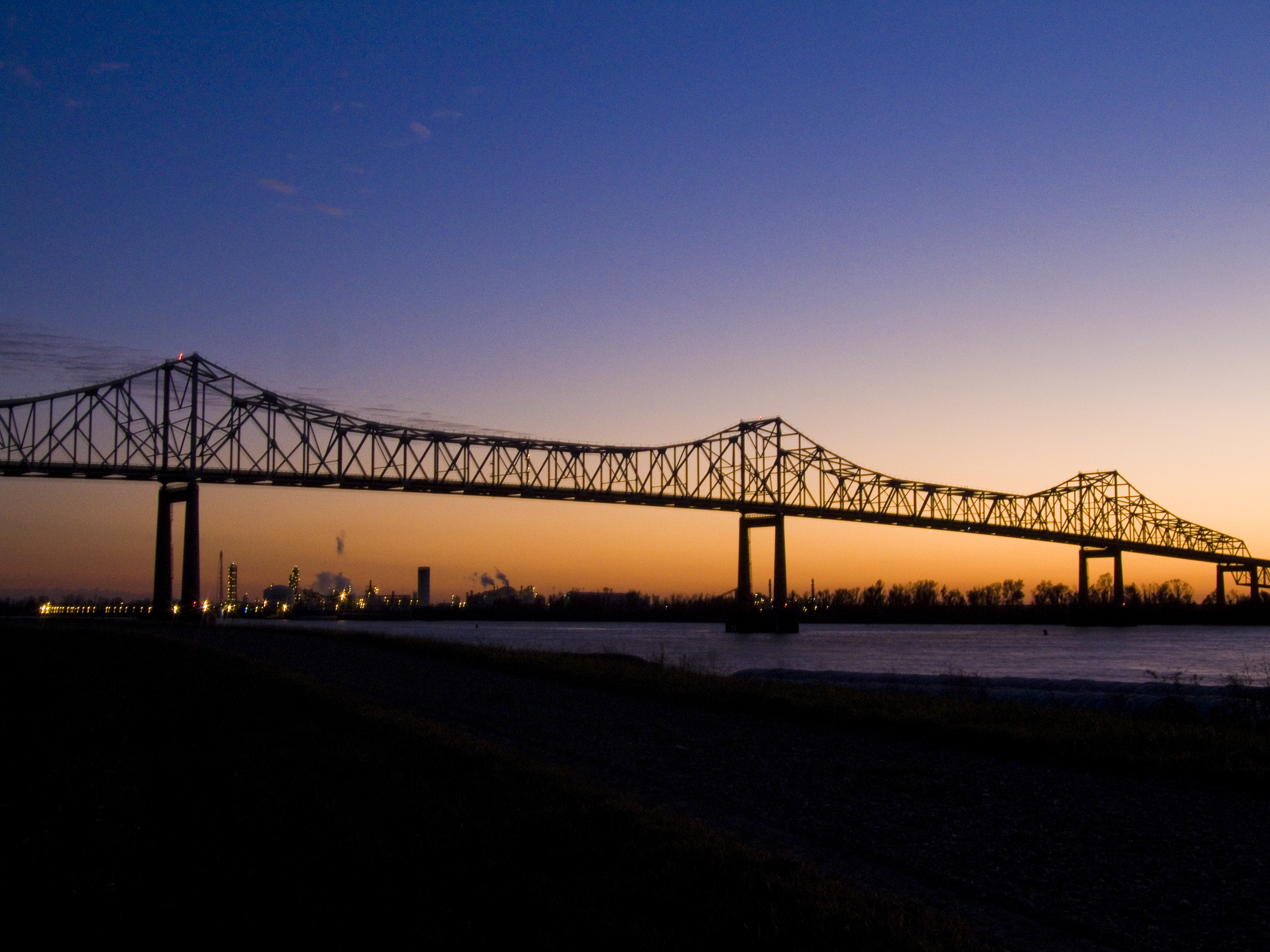
- Coordinates: 30°05′53″N 90°54′44″W
- Carries: 4 lanes of LA 70
- Crosses: Mississippi River
- Locale: unincorporated St. James Parish, Louisiana
- Maintained by: LaDOTD
- ID number: 614704260200721

Characteristics
- Design: Cantilever bridge
- Total length: 9,100 feet (2,774 m)
- Width: 64 feet (20 m)
- Longest span: 825 feet (251 m)
- Clearance below: 170 feet (52 m)

History
- Construction cost: $40 million
- Opened: August 1964
- Closed: October 2018; reopened April 2019

Statistics
- Daily traffic: 22,000

Location
- Interactive map of Sunshine Bridge

The Sunshine Bridge is a cantilever bridge over the Mississippi River in St. James Parish, Louisiana. Completed in 1963, it carries Louisiana Highway 70 (LA70), which connects Donaldsonville on the west bank of Ascension Parish with Sorrento on the east bank of Ascension Parish as well as with Gonzales on the east bank of Ascension Parish. The approach roads on the east and west banks begin in Ascension Parish before crossing into St. James Parish.

The bridge is a convenient river crossing for residents of Baton Rouge, Hammond, and the Florida Parishes to travel to the Bayou cities of Morgan City, Houma and Thibodaux as well as vice versa. The bridge plays an important role in storm evacuation and in industrial development along the Mississippi.

From its opening in 1964 through August 15, 2001, a 50-cent toll was collected on traffic crossing to the west bank. The toll was discontinued by an act of the Louisiana Legislature, authored by Louisiana State Representative Roy Quezaire (D-Donaldsonville), whose district included the bridge.

== Bridges to Nowhere ==
The bridge gained national attention in 2008 when it became part of the Bridge to Nowhere controversy which arose during the US Presidential Election. Focused primarily on the Alaskan Governor/Vice Presidential Candidate Sarah Palin's efforts to secure federal funding for the Gravina Island Bridge, the Sunshine Bridge was placed into the same category. While the only bridge across the Mississippi between New Orleans and Baton Rouge when it opened for traffic in 1964, its south end then emptied into a swamp, and for years it awaited funding to connect it to LA 70 and other roads. When this occurred, the economy in this area grew by leaps and bounds, largely due to the improved transportation.

Much of the criticism involved residual resentment from the bridge being named to recognize Governor Jimmie Davis. Built under his administration, Davis had twice picked and sung his way into the Governor's Mansion with hits like "You Are My Sunshine" and whose horse, which he rode into the Governor's office at his second inaugural, was also named Sunshine.

== 2018 barge collision and closure ==
On October 12, 2018, the Sunshine Bridge was struck by a crane mounted on a barge being pushed upriver by Marquette Transportation. State officials reported that the crane’s boom had not been lowered, causing it to collide with the bridge’s superstructure near the eastbound lanes. The impact caused severe damage to a main load-carrying chord and several diagonal members of the cantilever span, prompting the Louisiana Department of Transportation and Development (LaDOTD) to immediately close the bridge to all vehicular traffic.

=== Damage assessment and repairs ===
Initial inspections revealed deformation and fracturing in structural members that required full replacement. Emergency engineering teams developed a staged repair plan involving off-site fabrication of replacement steel components and on-site installation using specialized lifting equipment. Officials initially anticipated a reopening in early 2019, though fabrication complexity and extended inspections pushed the schedule into the spring.

=== Traffic impacts ===
The closure forced motorists to detour to either the Gramercy Bridge or the Horace Wilkinson Bridge in Baton Rouge, adding at least 10 miles (16 km) to many regional trips. LaDOTD installed advance warning and detour signs along major connecting highways, including the interchange of Interstate 10 and LA 22. Local petrochemical industries reported delays in freight movement and employee travel, and school districts on both sides of the river modified bus routes. Emergency officials also updated contingency plans for evacuation and response during the closure.

=== Reopening ===
All lanes of the bridge reopened on April 11, 2019, following the completion of steel repairs, repainting, and load testing. Total repair costs exceeded $30 million, which the state sought to recover from Marquette Transportation and its insurers. LaDOTD reported that the structure had returned to full operational capacity and resumed routine inspection schedules thereafter.

== Gallery ==
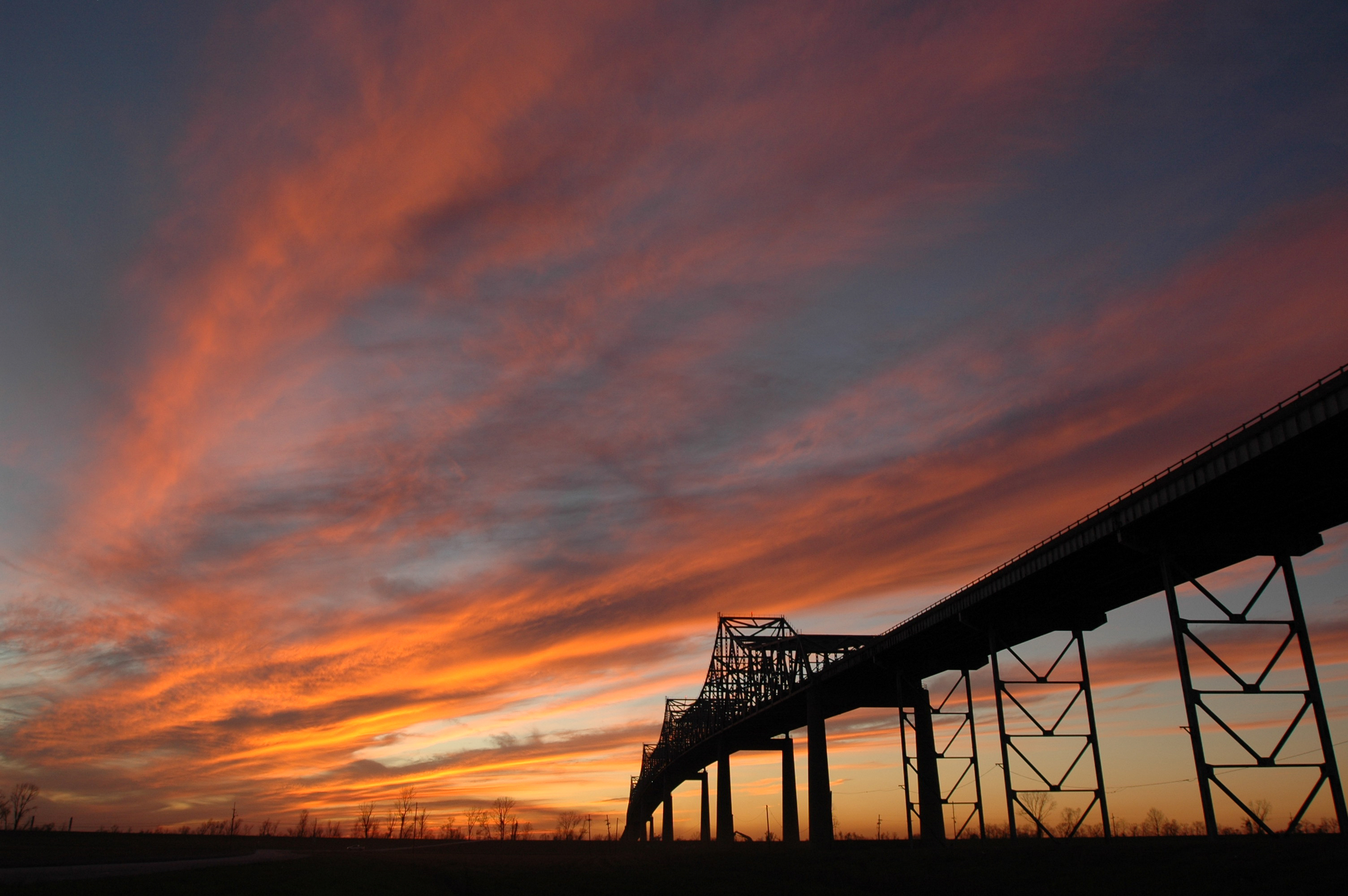
Sunshine Bridge Sunset

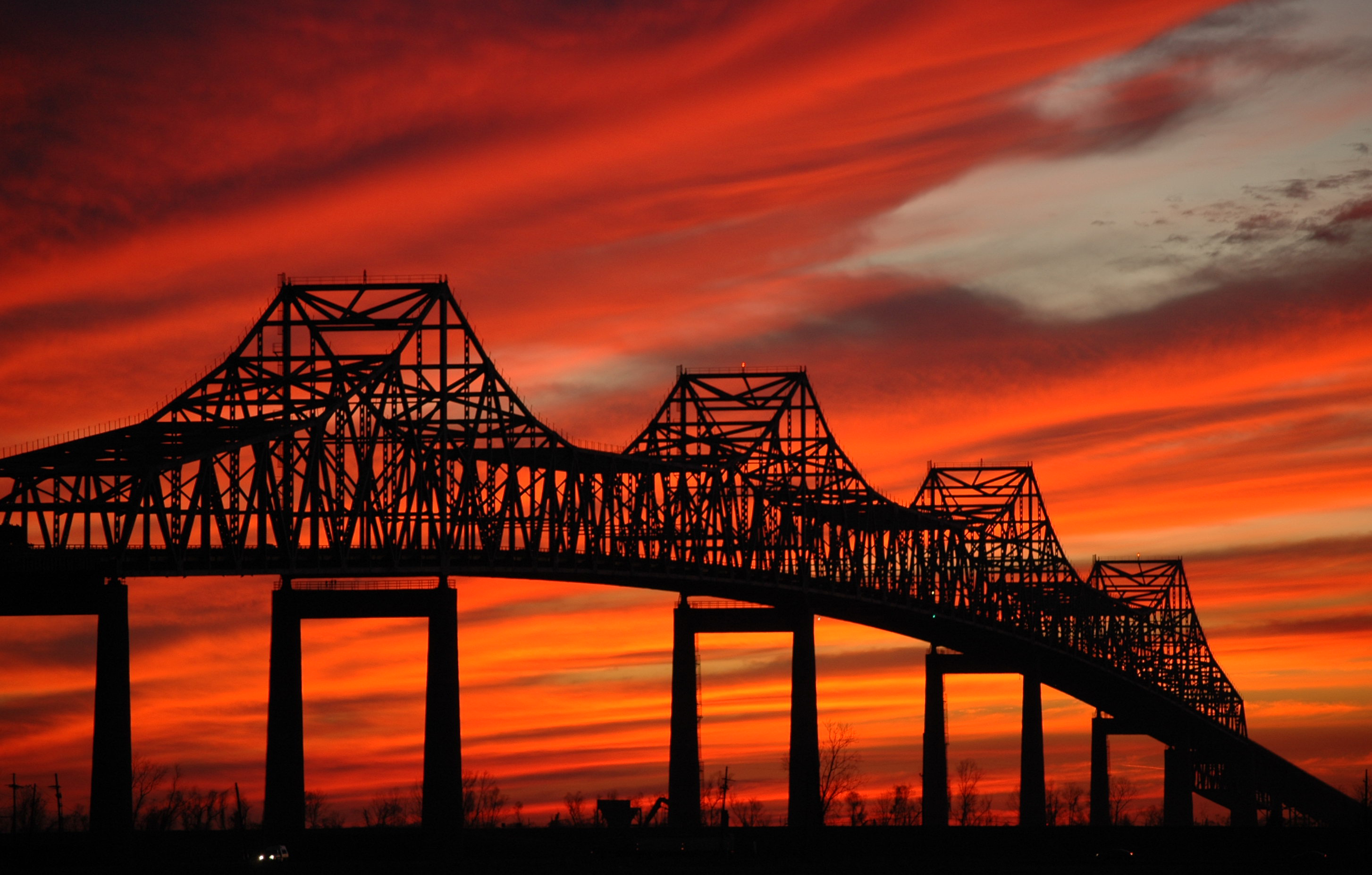
Sunshine Bridge Side View

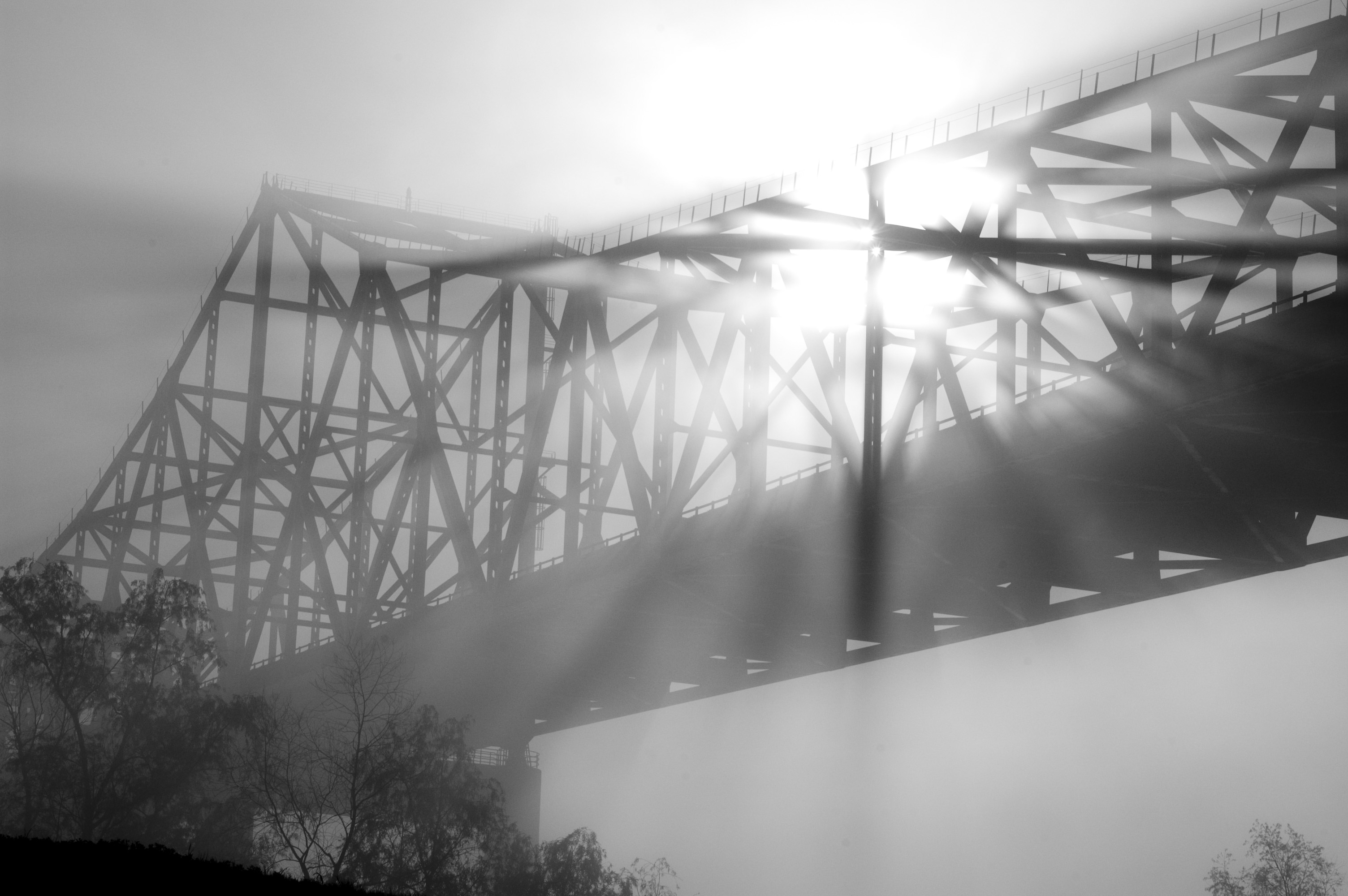
Sunshine Bridge in Fog

== See also ==
- List of crossings of the Lower Mississippi River
