= Frost, Louisiana =

Unincorporated community in Louisiana

- Unincorporated community
- Location within Louisiana Location within the United States
- Coordinates: 30°24′15″N 90°44′21″W
- Country: United States
- State: Louisiana
- Parish: Livingston
- Elevation: 26 ft (7.9 m)
- Time zone: UTC-6 (Central (CST))
  - Summer (DST): UTC-5 (CDT)
- ZIP code: 70754
- Area code: 225
- GNIS feature ID: 535135
- FIPS code: 22-27680

Frost is an unincorporated community in Livingston Parish, Louisiana, United States.

== History ==
A post office called Frost was established in 1919, and remained in operation until 1954. The community was named after the Frost family, who were the original owners of the town site.
