= 1928 United States presidential election in Louisiana =

1928 Louisiana presidential election held on Nov 6 as part of US national vote

1928 United States presidential elections in Louisiana
- November 6, 1928

Nominee	Al Smith	Herbert Hoover
Party	Democratic	Republican
Home state	New York	California
Running mate	Joseph T. Robinson	Charles Curtis
Electoral vote	10	0
Popular vote	164,655	51,160
Percentage	76.29%	23.70%
Parish results
Smith
50–60%
60–70%
70–80%
80–90%
90–100%
President before election
Calvin Coolidge
Republican
Elected President
Herbert Hoover
Republican

The 1928 United States presidential election in Louisiana took place on November 6, 1928, as part of the wider United States presidential election. Voters chose ten representatives, or electors, to the Electoral College, who voted for president and vice president.

Ever since the passage of a new constitution in 1898, Louisiana had been a one-party state dominated by the Democratic Party. The Republican Party became moribund due to the disenfranchisement of Black voters and the complete absence of other support bases, as Louisiana lacked upland or German refugee whites opposed to secession. Despite this single-party dominance, non-partisan tendencies remained strong among wealthy sugar planters in Acadiana and within the business elite of New Orleans.

Following disfranchisement, the state's politics became dominated by a coalition of the New Orleans–based Choctaw Club of Louisiana and Black Belt planters. Opposition began to emerge with the Socialist Party in the lumbering parishes of the northern hills and Imperial Calcasieu in the late 1900s, and more seriously with the Progressive movement, chiefly in the southern sugar-growing parishes, in the 1910s. Conflicts with President Wilson's Underwood-Simmons Act allowed Progressive Whitmell P. Martin (Note: Martin would join the Democratic Party in 1919.) to be elected to the Third Congressional District in 1914, and in 1920 the racially less hardline Acadiana region turned to Republican candidate Warren G. Harding over disagreements on foreign policy and the Nineteenth Amendment. Continued opposition to the Choctaw Club would elect former Progressive John M. Parker as governor at the beginning of 1920; however, Parker did not deliver his promised reforms, and Choctaw control returned temporarily with the 1924 election of Henry L. Fuqua.

Louisiana's delegates to the Democratic National Convention largely backed Catholic New York Governor Al Smith, who was opposed in the remainder of the South for his religion and opposition to Prohibition. At the same time, the state Republican Party—like those of Mississippi and South Carolina, entirely a vehicle for Federal patronage—was undergoing a "lily white" takeover from Walter Cohen's black-and-tan faction, although blacks were not expelled from the party as occurred in Alabama, North Carolina, and Virginia.

Unlike in the Upper South, Louisiana Democrats were controlled by fears that the Republican nominee, former Secretary of Commerce Herbert Hoover, supported racial equality. Although in the Protestant north and Florida Parishes there was opposition to Smith's religion and views on Prohibition, this was overshadowed by the desire for loyalty to the one-party system as an instrument of white supremacy, a viewpoint supported by newly elected Governor Huey Long. Moreover, identification with Smith's Catholicism was strong in Acadiana, where commitment to white supremacy was less intense.

Consequently, Smith and Arkansas Senator Joseph T. Robinson won Louisiana with 76.29 percent of the popular vote, to 23.70 percent for Hoover and Senate Majority Leader Charles Curtis of Kansas. Only in two parishes—Livingston and Washington, both proximate to the deeply anti-Catholic Mississippi Pine Belt and Florida panhandle—did Hoover pass forty percent of the vote, while in many Acadian parishes Hoover underperformed Calvin Coolidge by over thirty points. Louisiana was Smith's third strongest state in the election, after South Carolina and neighboring Mississippi.

== Results ==
1928 United States presidential election in Louisiana
Party	Candidate	Votes	%
Democratic	Alfred E. Smith	164,655	76.29%
Republican	Herbert Hoover	51,160	23.70%
Write-ins	—	18	0.01%
Total votes		215,833	100%

=== Results by parish ===
1928 United States presidential election in Louisiana by parish
Parish	Alfred Emmanuel Smith Democratic		Herbert Clark Hoover Republican		Various candidates Write-ins		Margin		Total votes cast
Parish	#	%	#	%	#	%	#	%	Total votes cast
Acadia	3,633	77.23%	1,071	22.77%			2,562	54.46%	4,704
Allen	1,308	64.34%	725	35.66%			583	28.68%	2,033
Ascension	1,402	76.28%	436	23.72%			966	52.56%	1,838
Assumption	948	75.54%	307	24.46%			641	51.08%	1,255
Avoyelles	2,896	87.36%	419	12.64%			2,477	74.72%	3,315
Beauregard	1,513	76.38%	468	23.62%			1,045	52.75%	1,981
Bienville	1,301	78.00%	367	22.00%			934	56.00%	1,668
Bossier	1,187	84.07%	225	15.93%			962	68.13%	1,412
Caddo	6,934	65.42%	3,665	34.58%			3,269	30.84%	10,599
Calcasieu	3,532	63.85%	1,997	36.10%	3	0.05%	1,535	27.75%	5,532
Caldwell	802	73.58%	288	26.42%			514	47.16%	1,090
Cameron	390	90.49%	41	9.51%			349	80.97%	431
Catahoula	710	67.55%	341	32.45%			369	35.11%	1,051
Claiborne	1,560	86.24%	249	13.76%			1,311	72.47%	1,809
Concordia	591	81.63%	133	18.37%			458	63.26%	724
De Soto	1,445	73.57%	517	26.32%	2	0.10%	928	47.25%	1,964
East Baton Rouge	4,575	60.44%	2,995	39.56%			1,580	20.87%	7,570
East Carroll	436	77.03%	130	22.97%			306	54.06%	566
East Feliciana	622	79.54%	160	20.46%			462	59.08%	782
Evangeline	1,873	86.19%	300	13.81%			1,573	72.39%	2,173
Franklin	1,141	69.87%	492	30.13%			649	39.74%	1,633
Grant	1,023	66.95%	505	33.05%			518	33.90%	1,528
Iberia	2,561	86.11%	413	13.89%			2,148	72.23%	2,974
Iberville	1,630	85.43%	278	14.57%			1,352	70.86%	1,908
Jackson	907	100.00%	0	0.00%			907	100.00%	907
Jefferson	5,326	87.77%	742	12.23%			4,584	75.54%	6,068
Jefferson Davis	1,703	60.33%	1,120	39.67%			583	20.65%	2,823
Lafayette	3,197	84.38%	592	15.62%			2,605	68.75%	3,789
Lafourche	1,994	89.14%	243	10.86%			1,751	78.27%	2,237
LaSalle	881	66.19%	450	33.81%			431	32.38%	1,331
Lincoln	1,041	60.84%	670	39.16%			371	21.68%	1,711
Livingston	1,047	51.78%	975	48.22%			72	3.56%	2,022
Madison	318	67.80%	151	32.20%			167	35.61%	469
Morehouse	840	71.19%	340	28.81%			500	42.37%	1,180
Natchitoches	2,099	79.96%	526	20.04%			1,573	59.92%	2,625
Orleans	55,919	79.49%	14,424	20.51%			41,495	58.99%	70,343
Ouachita	2,739	66.50%	1,380	33.50%			1,359	32.99%	4,119
Plaquemines	1,056	91.51%	98	8.49%			958	83.02%	1,154
Pointe Coupee	1,330	92.88%	102	7.12%			1,228	85.75%	1,432
Rapides	4,470	64.19%	2,494	35.81%			1,976	28.37%	6,964
Red River	891	73.09%	317	26.00%	11	0.90%	574	47.09%	1,219
Richland	1,083	81.74%	242	18.26%			841	63.47%	1,325
Sabine	1,414	65.80%	735	34.20%			679	31.60%	2,149
Saint Bernard	2,359	96.84%	77	3.16%			2,282	93.68%	2,436
Saint Charles	1,116	91.18%	108	8.82%			1,008	82.35%	1,224
Saint Helena	609	80.77%	145	19.23%			464	61.54%	754
Saint James	1,486	92.07%	128	7.93%			1,358	84.14%	1,614
Saint John the Baptist	971	89.16%	118	10.84%			853	78.33%	1,089
Saint Landry	3,394	82.54%	718	17.46%			2,676	65.08%	4,112
Saint Martin	1,892	88.66%	242	11.34%			1,650	77.32%	2,134
Saint Mary	1,754	74.35%	605	25.65%			1,149	48.71%	2,359
Saint Tammany	1,811	65.71%	945	34.29%			866	31.42%	2,756
Tangipahoa	2,834	66.70%	1,415	33.30%			1,419	33.40%	4,249
Tensas	350	78.48%	96	21.52%			254	56.95%	446
Terrebonne	1,642	85.97%	268	14.03%			1,374	71.94%	1,910
Union	1,085	71.90%	422	27.97%	2	0.13%	663	43.94%	1,509
Vermilion	2,580	85.12%	451	14.88%			2,129	70.24%	3,031
Vernon	2,191	81.42%	500	18.58%			1,691	62.84%	2,691
Washington	2,020	56.93%	1,528	43.07%			492	13.87%	3,548
Webster	1,430	80.07%	356	19.93%			1,074	60.13%	1,786
West Baton Rouge	608	88.63%	78	11.37%			530	77.26%	686
West Carroll	673	75.87%	214	24.13%			459	51.75%	887
West Feliciana	421	82.39%	90	17.61%			331	64.77%	511
Winn	1,161	68.54%	533	31.46%			628	37.07%	1,694
Totals	164,655	76.29%	51,160	23.70%	18	0.01%	113,495	52.58%	215,833

== See also ==
- United States presidential elections in Louisiana
