= Chinchuba, Louisiana =

Unincorporated community in Louisiana

- Unincorporated community
- Location within Louisiana Location within the United States
- Coordinates: 30°23′14″N 90°04′47″W
- Country: United States
- State: Louisiana
- Parish: St. Tammany
- Elevation: 20 ft (6.1 m)
- Time zone: UTC-6 (Central (CST))
  - Summer (DST): UTC-5 (CDT)
- Area code: 985
- GNIS feature ID: 560422

Chinchuba (also Ozone Park) is an unincorporated community in St. Tammany Parish, Louisiana, United States.

The community is on U.S. Route 190 just northwest of Mandeville.

== Etymology ==
The name is derived from the Choctaw word Hachunchuba which means alligator in the Choctaw language.
