= Livingston Parish, Louisiana =

Parish in Louisiana, United States

Livingston Parish
- Parish
- Parish of Livingston; Paroisse de Livingston (French); Parroquia de Livingston (Spanish)
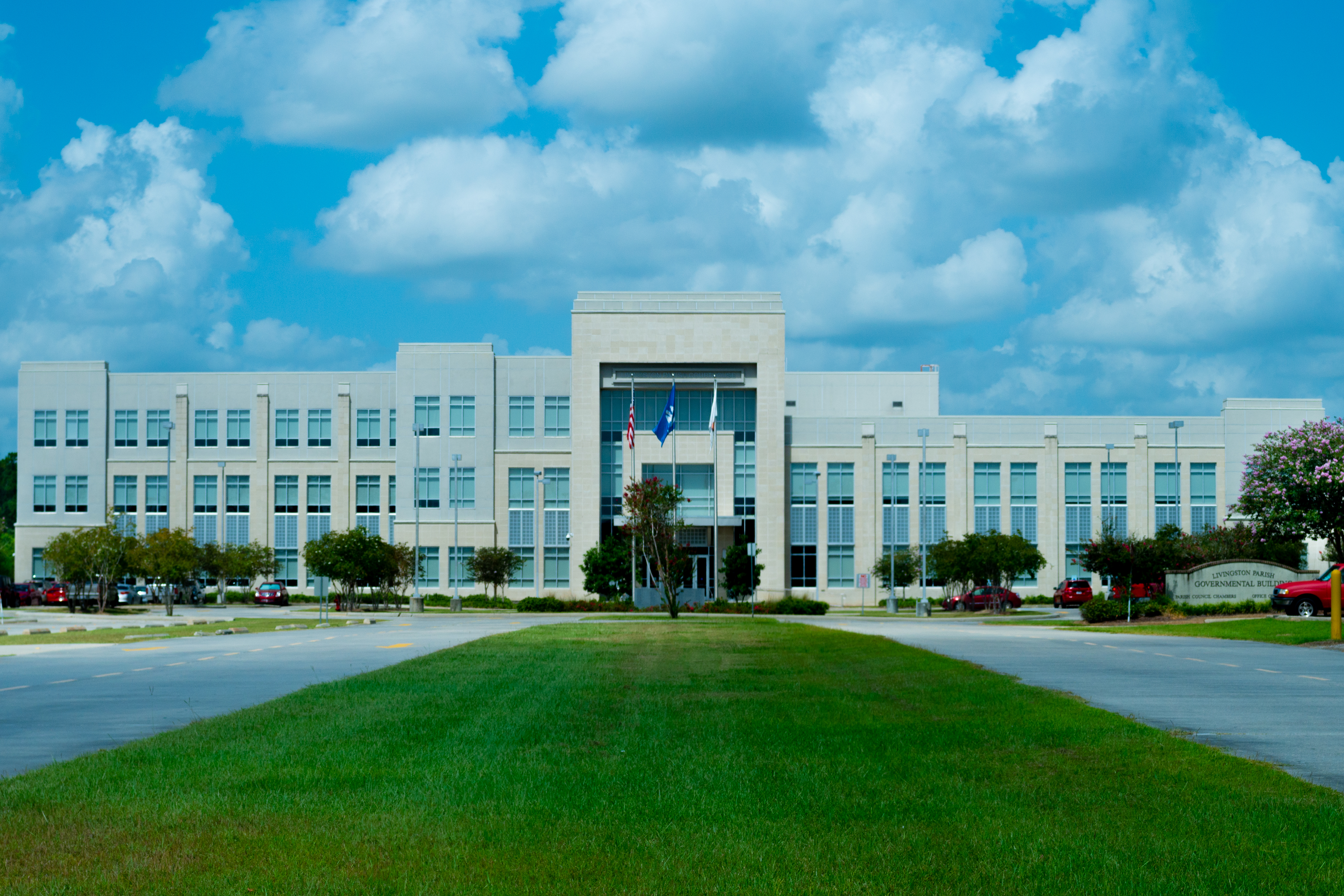
- Livingston Parish Courthouse in Livingston

- Seal Logo

- Location within the U.S. state of Louisiana
- Coordinates: 30°26′N 90°44′W
- Country: United States
- State: Louisiana
- Founded: February 10, 1832
- Named for: Edward Livingston
- Seat: Livingston
- Largest city: Denham Springs

Area
  - Total: 703 sq mi (1,820 km^{2})
  - Land: 648 sq mi (1,680 km^{2})
  - Water: 55 sq mi (140 km^{2}) 7.8%

Population (2020)
  - Total: 142,282
  - Estimate (2025): 155,036 ▲
  - Density: 220/sq mi (84.8/km^{2})
- Time zone: UTC−6 (Central)
  - Summer (DST): UTC−5 (CDT)
- Congressional districts: 1st, 5th
- Website: www.livingstonparishla.gov

Livingston Parish (French: Paroisse de Livingston, Spanish: Parroquia de Livingston) is a parish in the U.S. state of Louisiana. Its parish seat is the town of Livingston. Livingston Parish is one of the Florida Parishes; unlike the rest of the state, the region was part of the Spanish Empire, rather than the French Empire.

The name Livingston is an eponym honoring Edward Livingston, an American jurist and statesman who assisted in the drafting of the Louisiana Civil Code of 1825.

Livingston Parish is part of the Baton Rouge metropolitan area. At the 2020 census, the population of the county was 142,282. The southeastern portion of Livingston Parish is part of Louisiana's 1st congressional district, while northern and western Livingston is part of the 5th district.

== History ==
Livingston Parish was created by the state legislature in 1832 from part of St. Helena Parish. The historical parish seats were Van Buren (1832–1835), Springfield (1835–1872), Port Vincent (1872–1881), and Centerville, also known as Springville (1881–1941). Livingston became the seat of government in 1941.

Louisiana's first execution by electrocution took place in Livingston Parish in September 1941, using the state's unusual traveling electric chair, purpose-built with a generator so it could be used in places like the parish seat that were not yet electrified.

During the 2016 Louisiana floods, Livingston Parish was one of the hardest hit areas. An official estimated that 75 percent of the homes in the parish were a total loss.

== Geography ==
According to the U.S. Census Bureau, the parish has a total area of 703 square miles (1,820 km^{2}), of which 648 square miles (1,680 km^{2}) is land and 55 square miles (140 km^{2}) (7.8%) is water.

=== Major highways ===
- Interstate 12
- U.S. Highway 190
- Louisiana Highway 16
- Louisiana Highway 22
- Louisiana Highway 40
- Louisiana Highway 42
- Louisiana Highway 43
- Louisiana Highway 63
- Louisiana Highway 64
- Louisiana Highway 441
- Louisiana Highway 442
- Louisiana Highway 444
- Louisiana Highway 447
- Louisiana Highway 1019
- Louisiana Highway 1020
- Louisiana Highway 1022
- Louisiana Highway 1023
- Louisiana Highway 1024
- Louisiana Highway 1025
- Louisiana Highway 1026
- Louisiana Highway 1027
- Louisiana Highway 1028
- Louisiana Highway 1029
- Louisiana Highway 1030
- Louisiana Highway 1031
- Louisiana Highway 1032
- Louisiana Highway 1033
- Louisiana Highway 1034
- Louisiana Highway 1036
- Louisiana Highway 1037
- Louisiana Highway 1038
- Louisiana Highway 1039
- Louisiana Highway 1040
- Louisiana Highway 1063
- Louisiana Highway 1064
- Louisiana Highway 1259
- Louisiana Highway 3002
- Louisiana Highway 3003

=== State park ===
- Tickfaw State Park

=== Adjacent parishes ===
- St. Helena Parish (north)
- Tangipahoa Parish (east)
- St. John the Baptist Parish (southeast)
- Ascension Parish (southwest)
- East Baton Rouge Parish (west)

== Communities ==
=== Cities ===
- Denham Springs
- Walker

=== Towns ===
- Livingston (parish seat)
- Springfield
- Albany

=== Villages ===
- French Settlement
- Killian
- Port Vincent

=== Census-designated place ===
- Watson

=== Unincorporated communities ===
- Colyell
- Corbin
- Doyle
- Frost
- Georgeville
- Head of Island
- Holden
- Maurepas
- Magnolia
- Satsuma
- Whitehall

=== Historic Community ===
- Van Buren

== Demographics ==
Historical population
| Census | Pop. | Note | %± |
|---|---|---|---|
| 1840 | 2,315 | | — |
| 1850 | 3,385 | | 46.2% |
| 1860 | 4,431 | | 30.9% |
| 1870 | 4,026 | | −9.1% |
| 1880 | 5,258 | | 30.6% |
| 1890 | 5,769 | | 9.7% |
| 1900 | 8,100 | | 40.4% |
| 1910 | 10,627 | | 31.2% |
| 1920 | 11,643 | | 9.6% |
| 1930 | 18,206 | | 56.4% |
| 1940 | 17,790 | | −2.3% |
| 1950 | 20,054 | | 12.7% |
| 1960 | 26,974 | | 34.5% |
| 1970 | 36,511 | | 35.4% |
| 1980 | 58,806 | | 61.1% |
| 1990 | 70,526 | | 19.9% |
| 2000 | 91,814 | | 30.2% |
| 2010 | 128,026 | | 39.4% |
| 2020 | 142,282 | | 11.1% |
| 2025 (est.) | 155,036 | ▲ | 9.0% |
U.S. Decennial Census

Livingston Parish, Louisiana – Racial and ethnic composition Note: the US Census treats Hispanic/Latino as an ethnic category. This table excludes Latinos from the racial categories and assigns them to a separate category. Hispanics/Latinos may be of any race.
| Race / Ethnicity (NH = Non-Hispanic) | Pop 1980 | Pop 1990 | Pop 2000 | Pop 2010 | Pop 2020 | % 1980 | % 1990 | % 2000 | % 2010 | % 2020 |
|---|---|---|---|---|---|---|---|---|---|---|
| White alone (NH) | 54,045 | 65,689 | 85,882 | 115,362 | 114,876 | 91.90% | 93.14% | 93.54% | 90.11% | 80.74% |
| Black or African American alone (NH) | 3,918 | 3,914 | 3,846 | 6,455 | 11,178 | 6.66% | 5.55% | 4.19% | 5.04% | 7.86% |
| Native American or Alaska Native alone (NH) | 71 | 160 | 329 | 484 | 365 | 0.12% | 0.23% | 0.36% | 0.38% | 0.26% |
| Asian alone (NH) | 78 | 112 | 160 | 616 | 1,116 | 0.13% | 0.16% | 0.17% | 0.48% | 0.78% |
| Native Hawaiian or Pacific Islander alone (NH) | x | x | 10 | 24 | 36 | x | x | 0.01% | 0.02% | 0.03% |
| Other race alone (NH) | 20 | 9 | 27 | 92 | 361 | 0.03% | 0.01% | 0.03% | 0.07% | 0.25% |
| Mixed race or Multiracial (NH) | x | x | 543 | 1,192 | 5,559 | x | x | 0.59% | 0.93% | 3.91% |
| Hispanic or Latino (any race) | 674 | 642 | 1,017 | 3,801 | 8,791 | 1.15% | 0.91% | 1.11% | 2.97% | 6.18% |
| Total | 58,806 | 70,526 | 91,814 | 128,026 | 142,282 | 100.00% | 100.00% | 100.00% | 100.00% | 100.00% |

At the 2000 United States census, there were 91,814 people, 32,630 households, and 25,549 families residing in the parish. The population density was 142 inhabitants per square mile (55/km^{2}). There were 36,212 housing units at an average density of 56 per square mile (22/km^{2}). The racial makeup of the parish was 94.35% White, 4.22% Black or African American, 0.36% Native American, 0.18% Asian, 0.02% Pacific Islander, 0.19% from other races, and 0.68% from two or more races; 1.11% of the population were Hispanic or Latin American of any race.

There were 32,630 households, out of which 41.60% had children under the age of 18 living with them, 63.10% were married couples living together, 10.70% had a female householder with no husband present, and 21.70% were non-families. 18.20% of all households were made up of individuals, and 6.50% had someone living alone who was 65 years of age or older. The average household size was 2.80 and the average family size was 3.17.

In the parish the population was spread out, with 29.50% under the age of 18, 9.10% from 18 to 24, 31.50% from 25 to 44, 21.40% from 45 to 64, and 8.50% who were 65 years of age or older. The median age was 33 years. For every 100 females, there were 98.50 males. For every 100 females age 18 and over, there were 94.50 males.

The median income for a household in the parish was $38,887, and the median income for a family was $44,071. Males had a median income of $36,508 versus $22,325 for females. The per capita income for the parish was $16,282. As of August 2001, about 43,800 people were employed in the parish. The unemployment rate was 4.8%. About 9.10% of families and 11.40% of the population were below the poverty line, including 11.70% of those under age 18 and 15.80% of those age 65 or over.

Hurricane Katrina had a dramatic effect on the population in Livingston Parish. Many displaced families of the affected parishes have moved into the area, and as a result the population of Livingston Parish has increased significantly. On June 6, 2007, the U.S. Census Bureau published a report "Special Population Estimates for Impacted Counties in the Gulf Coast Area" which showed a population increase for Livingston Parish to 111,863 as of January 1, 2006.

The 2019 American Community Survey estimated 138,928 people and 48,410 households lived in the parish, up from 128,026 at the 2010 United States census. Its racial and ethnic makeup was 90.3% non-Hispanic white, 6.0% Black and African American, 0.4% American Indian and Alaska Native, 0.6% Asian alone, 0.8% some other race, 1.8% two or more races, and 3.7% Hispanic or Latin American of any race. At the 2020 United States census, there were 142,282 people, 47,014 households, and 32,840 families residing in the parish.

Among the population in 2019, 74.1% were aged 18 and older, 6.6% aged 5 and under, and 12.9% aged 65 and older. The median age was 36.6, and 2.2% of the population were foreign born.

An estimated 10,280 businesses were established in the parish, and 1,105 were minority-owned firms. Of the population, 59.3% were employed in the parish and 81.8% owned housing units. The median house value was $167,100, and the median gross rent from 2015 to 2019 was $934. The median household income was $63,389 and 15.2% of the parish lived at or below the poverty line.

Livingston Parish, according to the Association of Religion Data Archives in 2020, is dominated by the Southern Baptist Convention as its single largest religious group. Southern Baptists numbered 30,815 and the Catholic Church was the parish's second largest religious group with 14,007 followed by non-denominational Protestants with 11,230 members.

== Economy ==
Livingston Parish is home of one of two installations for the LIGO gravitational wave observatory, which is a facility dedicated to the detection of cosmic gravitational waves for scientific research. As of January 2015, Livingston Parish was Louisiana's fastest-growing parish.

== Education ==
The Livingston Parish Public Schools operates all public schools in the parish. The parish in the service area of Baton Rouge Community College.

== Law and government ==
Livingston Parish is a Council-President parish governed by a Home Rule Charter and enforced by a Parish Council and Parish President. The Parish President is the head of the executive branch of government, and the Parish Council comprises the legislative branch.

Livingston Parish is divided into nine council districts. The borders of each district are drawn to even out the population in each district.

At the end of 2014, the construction of a new Livingston Parish Courthouse was completed, with the ribbon-cutting scheduled for mid-February 2015. The new facility contains over 100,000 square feet of governmental office space; it replaces an antiquated complex dating back more than seventy years.

Together with the parishes of St. Helena and Tangipahoa, Livingston Parish forms Louisiana's 21st judicial district.

== Politics ==
For much of its history, Livingston Parish voted Democratic, being characteristic of the "Solid South". It demonstrated Piney Woods voting behavior in 1928, where it was Herbert Hoover’s best parish in Louisiana, though he still lost it by about 3.5%. Like other parishes in the Baton Rouge metropolitan area, Livingston remained loyal to Harry S. Truman in 1948 and to Adlai Stevenson II in 1956, when Louisiana's electoral votes went to Strom Thurmond and Dwight D. Eisenhower respectively. Barry Goldwater became the first Republican to win the parish in 1964. Dixiecrat George Wallace carried the parish in 1968, and Richard Nixon in 1972 made it Republican for the second time. It then returned to the Democrats, going to Jimmy Carter in both 1976 and 1980.

In recent years, Livingston Parish has been one of the most Republican parishes in Louisiana, and one of the most Republican county-equivalents in the nation. It has gone Republican in every presidential election since 1984. In the 2004 election, George W. Bush received 33,976 votes, or 77% of the parish's total, more than three times the 9,895 votes (22%) his opponent, John Kerry, received. The Republicans fared better still in the 2008 election, in which John McCain received 43,269 votes (85% of the total) to just 6,681 votes (13%) for Democrat Barack Obama. Livingston Parish has voted about 85% Republican in every election since then.

United States presidential election results for Livingston Parish, Louisiana
| Year | Republican | | Democratic | | Third party(ies) | |
| Year | No. | % | No. | % | No. | % |
|---|---|---|---|---|---|---|
| 1912 | 3 | 0.63% | 379 | 80.13% | 91 | 19.24% |
| 1916 | 35 | 6.29% | 503 | 90.47% | 18 | 3.24% |
| 1920 | 218 | 24.41% | 674 | 75.48% | 1 | 0.11% |
| 1924 | 110 | 14.34% | 657 | 85.66% | 0 | 0.00% |
| 1928 | 975 | 48.22% | 1,047 | 51.78% | 0 | 0.00% |
| 1932 | 89 | 4.36% | 1,953 | 95.64% | 0 | 0.00% |
| 1936 | 496 | 17.04% | 2,414 | 82.96% | 0 | 0.00% |
| 1940 | 252 | 7.82% | 2,971 | 92.18% | 0 | 0.00% |
| 1944 | 343 | 12.24% | 2,460 | 87.76% | 0 | 0.00% |
| 1948 | 264 | 7.61% | 1,841 | 53.04% | 1,366 | 39.35% |
| 1952 | 1,436 | 28.64% | 3,578 | 71.36% | 0 | 0.00% |
| 1956 | 1,628 | 37.24% | 2,571 | 58.81% | 173 | 3.96% |
| 1960 | 954 | 14.39% | 2,881 | 43.47% | 2,793 | 42.14% |
| 1964 | 5,508 | 61.08% | 3,509 | 38.92% | 0 | 0.00% |
| 1968 | 947 | 7.73% | 1,400 | 11.42% | 9,907 | 80.85% |
| 1972 | 7,481 | 72.96% | 1,898 | 18.51% | 874 | 8.52% |
| 1976 | 5,555 | 34.95% | 9,875 | 62.13% | 465 | 2.93% |
| 1980 | 10,666 | 47.18% | 11,319 | 50.06% | 624 | 2.76% |
| 1984 | 17,465 | 65.72% | 8,913 | 33.54% | 198 | 0.75% |
| 1988 | 15,779 | 61.29% | 9,659 | 37.52% | 305 | 1.18% |
| 1992 | 14,808 | 47.13% | 11,499 | 36.60% | 5,114 | 16.28% |
| 1996 | 16,159 | 47.39% | 13,276 | 38.94% | 4,660 | 13.67% |
| 2000 | 24,889 | 67.51% | 11,008 | 29.86% | 968 | 2.63% |
| 2004 | 33,976 | 76.78% | 9,895 | 22.36% | 382 | 0.86% |
| 2008 | 43,269 | 85.02% | 6,681 | 13.13% | 942 | 1.85% |
| 2012 | 45,513 | 84.19% | 7,451 | 13.78% | 1,098 | 2.03% |
| 2016 | 48,824 | 84.57% | 6,950 | 12.04% | 1,956 | 3.39% |
| 2020 | 54,877 | 84.13% | 9,249 | 14.18% | 1,104 | 1.69% |
| 2024 | 55,101 | 83.61% | 9,965 | 15.12% | 840 | 1.27% |

== See also ==
- Mike Branch
- Tickfaw State Park
- National Register of Historic Places listings in Livingston Parish, Louisiana
