= Maurepas, Louisiana =

Unincorporated community in Louisiana, U.S.

Coordinates: 30°17′49″N 90°39′50″W

Maurepas is an unincorporated community in the south/southwestern area of Livingston Parish, Louisiana, United States. Louisiana Highway 22 passes through the community and Whitehall lies two miles to the east. Lake Maurepas is six miles to the east and the Amite River lies approximately one half mile to the north. The ZIP Code for Maurepas is 70449.

Lake Maurepas is located to the west of Lake Pontchartrain, Louisiana's largest lake.
