= Tickfaw State Park =

State park in Louisiana, United States

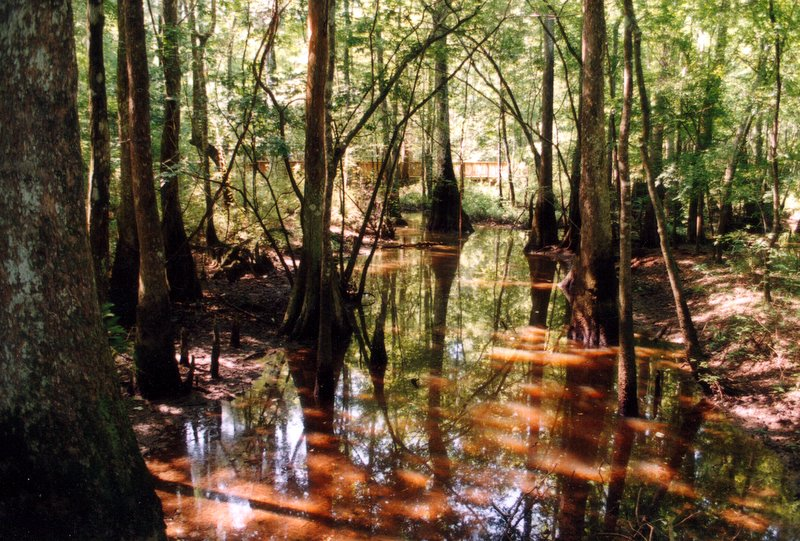

- Location within Louisiana
- Location: Livingston Parish, Louisiana, United States
- Coordinates: 30.3822°N 90.6313°W
- Area: approx. 1,200 acres (4.9 km^{2}; 1.9 sq mi)
- Established: 1999
- Visitors: 37,748 (in 2022)
- Governing body: Louisiana Office of State Parks
- Website: Official website

Tickfaw State Park, located 7 mi (11 km) west of Springfield, in Livingston Parish, Louisiana, United States, opened in May 1999 and quickly became one of Louisiana's most popular state parks because of its natural setting, recreation opportunities, and proximity to the state's two cities: New Orleans and Baton Rouge. The park contains a nature center, picnic shelters, a large fishing pond, 14 cabins, and 50 campsites.

Trails and more than 1 mi (1.6 km) of boardwalks allow visitors to explore four different ecosystems within the park: cypress-tupelo swamp, bottomland hardwood forest, mixed pine hardwood forest, and the Tickfaw River. Much of Tickfaw's 1,200 acres (490 ha) area lies within the Tickfaw River floodplain and is thus subject to periodic flooding. About 560 acres (230 ha) of the park west of the Tickfaw River remain undeveloped.

Tickfaw State Park is recognized as one of 110 sites on the Louisiana Natural Areas Registry for its outstanding natural characteristics. Its rich natural habitat provides a home for various birds, fish, reptiles and mammals including American alligators, nine-banded armadillos, North American beavers, white-tailed deer, foxes, Virginia opossums, rabbits, raccoons, and squirrels. Carolina anoles and skinks are frequently seen along the boardwalks.

Canoeing is a popular pastime at Tickfaw State Park. Canoes are available for rent, or paddlers may bring their own. During warm months, an on-premises water playground allows guests to cool off.

== See also ==
- List of Louisiana state parks
