= List of state highways in Louisiana =

Louisiana State Highways
- State highway markers for different years: 1955 (left), 1990 (center), 2008–present (right)

System information
- Length: 16,698.41 mi (26,873.49 km)
- Formed: 1955 renumbering
- Notes: Since 2008, La DOTD has been replacing the green-and-white state highway markers with a black-and-white version using the same design. The new shields have a black background, white silhouette, black letters and numbers, and no frame outline (see photo below for comparison).

Highway names
- State: Louisiana Highway X (LA X)
- Special routes: Louisiana Highway X Alternate (LA X Alt.); Louisiana Highway X Business (LA X Bus.); Louisiana Highway X Bypass (LA X Byp.); Louisiana Highway X Spur (LA X Spur); Louisiana Highway X Truck (LA X Truck)

System links
- Louisiana State Highway System; Interstate; US; State; Scenic

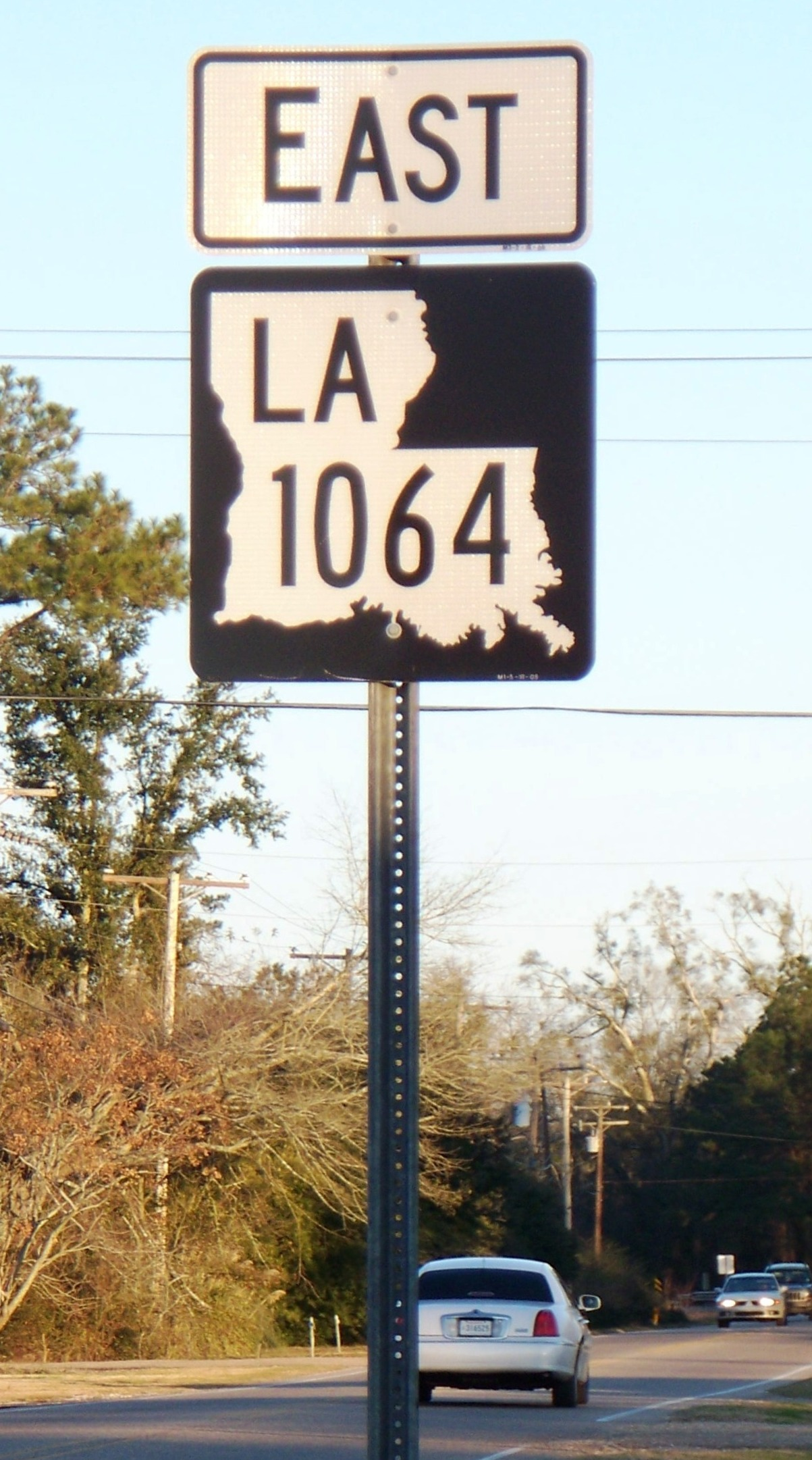
2008-style state highway marker on eastbound LA 1064 in Natalbany.

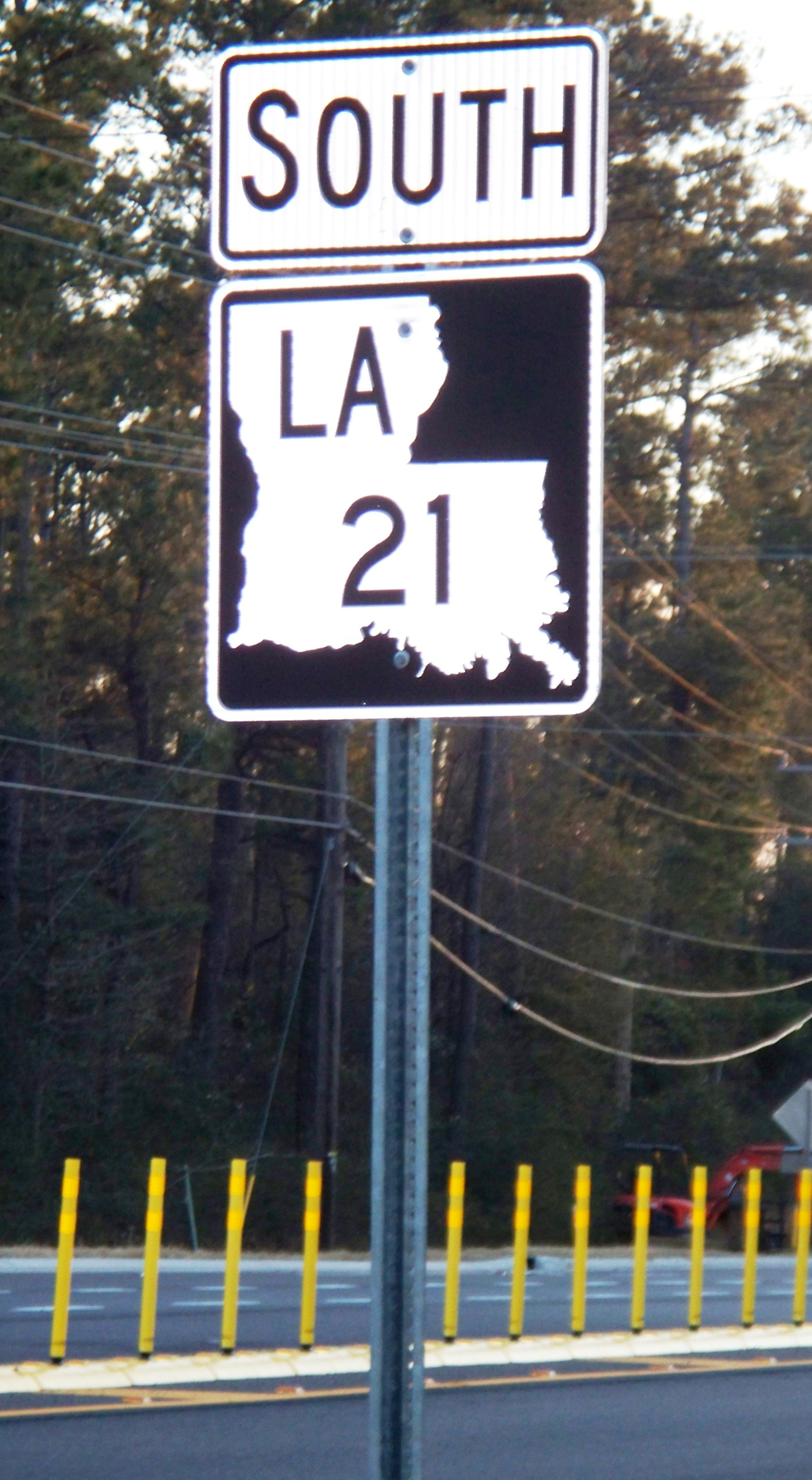
After months of posting the black-and-white shields without a line border, La DOTD began posting some state shields with a white border, as in this photo taken on January 14, 2010. This marker is located on LA 21 between Covington and I-12.

The state highways in the U.S. state of Louisiana are owned and maintained by the Louisiana Department of Transportation and Development (La DOTD).

== List ==
=== LA 1 to LA 99 ===
Number	Length (mi)	Length (km)	Southern or western terminus	Northern or eastern terminus	Formed	Removed	Notes
LA 1	431.877	695.039	Bayou Rigaud in Grand Isle	SH 77 northwest of Rodessa at the Texas state line	1955	current	Longest highway in Louisiana
LA 2	189.490	304.955	SH 49 west of Trees at the Texas state line	US 65 north of Lake Providence	1955	current	
LA 3	35.705	57.462	I-20, US 71, and LA 72 in Bossier City	AR 29 at the Arkansas state line north of Plain Dealing	1955	current	
LA 4	164.537	264.797	US 71 north of Loggy Bayou	LA 605 in Newellton	1955	current	
LA 5	28.361	45.643	US 84 in Logansport	LA 175 at Kingston	1955	current	
LA 6	54.518	87.738	SH 21 at the Texas state line southwest of Many	US 71 and US 84 in Clarence	1955	current	
LA 7	—	—	US 71 in Coushatta	Arkansas state line at Springhill	1955	1994	Became US 371
LA 8	156.273	251.497	SH 63 at the Texas state line west of Burr Ferry	US 425/LA 15 in Sicily Island	1955	current	
LA 9	100.005	160.942	US 71/US 84 in Campti	US 63/US 167 in Junction City	1955	current	
LA 10	255.505	411.195	US 171 south of Leesville	Mississippi state line east of Bogalusa	1955	current	
LA 12	34.368	55.310	Texas state line west of Starks	US 171 and US 190 in Ragley	1955	current	
LA 13	63.993	102.987	LA 14 west of Kaplan	US 167 in Turkey Creek	1955	current	
LA 14	100.197	161.251	US 90 and US 171 in Lake Charles	LA 182 in New Iberia	1955	current	
LA 15	194.102	312.377	LA 1 and LA 970 northwest of Lettsworth	US 63/US 167 in Lillie	1955	current	
LA 16	110.234	177.404	LA 22 south of French Settlement	LA 21 in Sun	1955	current	
LA 17	66.717	107.371	US 425/LA 15, LA 4, and LA 130 in Winnsboro	Arkansas state line at Kilbourne	1955	current	
LA 18	80.118	128.937	LA 1 and LA 3089 in Donaldsonville	US 90 Bus. and LA 23 in Gretna	1955	current	
LA 19	33.897	54.552	US 61 in Baton Rouge	Mississippi state line north of Norwood	1955	current	
LA 20	36.656	58.992	LA 182 in Gibson	LA 18 in Vacherie	1955	current	
LA 21	52.023	83.723	LA 22 and LA 1077 in Madisonville	Mississippi state line north of Angie	1955	current	
LA 22	71.239	114.648	LA 75 and LA 942 in Darrow	US 190 in Mandeville	1955	current	
LA 23	73.638	118.509	Jump Basin Road in Venice	LA 428 in Gretna	1955	current	
LA 24	35.667	57.400	LA 20 in Schriever	LA 3235 in Larose	1955	current	
LA 25	38.720	62.314	US 190 in Covington	Mississippi state line north of Warnerton	1955	current	
LA 26	75.911	122.167	US 171/US 190 southeast of DeRidder	LA 14 in Lake Arthur	1955	current	
LA 27	132.424	213.116	LA 14 at Holmwood	US 171 and US 190 in DeRidder	1955	current	
LA 28	87.347	140.571	US 171 and LA 8 in Leesville	US 84 west of Jonesville	1955	current	
LA 29	54.141	87.131	LA 13 north of Eunice	LA 114 west of Moreauville	1955	current	
LA 30	27.842	44.807	I-10 in Baton Rouge	US 61 and LA 431 east of Gonzales	1955	current	
LA 31	54.577	87.833	LA 182 in New Iberia	LA 182 in Opelousas	1955	current	
LA 32	—	—	LA 30 in Baton Rouge	Louisiana State Capitol building in Baton Rouge	1955	c. 1957	
LA 33	43.901	70.652	US 80 in Ruston	Arkansas state line north of Marion	1955	current	
LA 34	86.010	138.420	US 71 and LA 1239-2 in Montgomery	US 80/LA 15 in West Monroe	1955	current	
LA 35	52.197	84.003	LA 82 north of Forked Island	US 190 in Lawtell	1955	current	
LA 36	18.939	30.479	LA 21 east of Covington	LA 41 northwest of Pearl River	1955	current	
LA 37	42.687	68.698	US 61/US 190 in Baton Rouge	LA 10 in Greensburg	1955	current	
LA 38	48.573	78.171	LA 10 in Coleman Town	LA 430 south of Hackley	1955	current	
LA 39	54.327	87.431	Parish Road 15 in Pointe à la Hache	I-10 in New Orleans	1955	current	
LA 40	53.282	85.749	LA 43 southeast of Montpelier	LA 41 in Bush	1955	current	
LA 41	23.074	37.134	US 11 and LA 3081 in Pearl River	LA 21 in Bush	1955	current	
LA 42	47.8	76.9	US 61 in Prairieville	LA 22 and LA 1037 in Springfield	1955	current	
LA 43	44.380	71.423	LA 42 west of Springfield	Mississippi state line north of Easleyville	1955	current	
LA 44	49.970	80.419	LA 42 in Prairieville	US 61 in LaPlace	1955	current	
LA 45	22.602	36.374	Bayou Barataria in Lafitte	LA 18 in Marrero	1955	current	
LA 46	29.535	47.532	LA 39 and LA 3021 in New Orleans	Shell Beach	1955	current	
LA 47	16.305	26.240	Chalmette	New Orleans	1955	current	
LA 48	20.960	33.732	US 61 in Norco	US 90 and LA 3152 in Elmwood	1955	current	
LA 49	3.916	6.302	US 61	Kenner	1955	current	
LA 50	0.850	1.368	LA 48 (River Road) at the Mississippi River	US 61 (Airline Highway)	1955	current	
LA 52	2.731	4.395	US 90 and LA 633 in Boutte	LA 18 in Luling	1955	current	
LA 53	1.634	2.630	LA 44 (River Road) and LA 640 opposite the defunct Edgard–Reserve Ferry	US 61 (West Airline Highway)	1955	current	
LA 54	2.343	3.771	LA 44	US 61 in Garyville	1955	current	
LA 55	14.094	22.682	Montegut	LA 24 in Bourg	1955	current	
LA 56	25.495	41.030	Cocodrie	LA 24 in Houma	1955	current	
LA 57	25.053	40.319	LA 56 north of Cocodrie	LA 24 in Houma	1955	current	
LA 58	1.614	2.597	LA 56 in Chauvin	LA 55 in Montegut	1955	current	
LA 59	11.793	18.979	US 190 in Mandeville	LA 21 north of Abita Springs	1955	current	
LA 60	16.047	25.825	LA 16 in Enon	LA 10 in Bogalusa	1955	current	
LA 62	11.863	19.092	LA 10 in Sheridan	Mississippi state line north of State Line	1955	current	
LA 63	52.48	84.46	LA 444 east of French Settlement	LA 67 in Clinton	1955	current	
LA 64	20.355	32.758	LA 964 in Zachary	LA 16 and LA 1026 north of Denham Springs	1955	current	
LA 64-1	1.983	3.191	US 61 in East Baton Rouge Parish	Barnett Road in East Baton Rouge Parish	2015	current	Former LA 64
LA 66	19.620	31.575	Louisiana State Penitentiary at Angola	US 61 north of St. Francisville	1955	current	
LA 67	43.60	70.17	LA 73 in Baton Rouge	Mississippi state line north of Clinton	1955	current	
LA 68	19.252	30.983	US 61 north of Port Hudson	LA 19 in Wilson	1955	current	
LA 69	15.381	24.753	LA 70 in Grand Bayou	LA 1 northwest of White Castle	1955	current	
LA 70	51.084	82.212	US 90, US 90 Bus., and LA 182 in Morgan City	LA 22 in Sorrento	1955	current	
LA 72	2.492	4.010	Bossier City	US 79/US 80 in Bossier City	1955	current	
LA 73	26.318	42.355	LA 75 in Geismar	LA 30 in Baton Rouge	1955	current	
LA 74	10.683	17.193	LA 75 in St. Gabriel	US 61 north of Gonzales	1955	current	
LA 75	46.703	75.161	Bayou Pigeon	LA 22 and LA 942 in Darrow	1955	current	
LA 76	25.477	41.001	LA 77 in Maringouin	LA 1 and LA 987-4 in Port Allen	1955	current	
LA 77	49.136	79.077	LA 1 in Plaquemine	LA 10 north of Fordoche	1955	current	
LA 78	7.558	12.163	US 190 and LA 411 in Livonia	LA 1 in Parlange	1955	current	
LA 81	8.825	14.202	LA 77 in Livonia	LA 77 in Fordoche	1955	current	
LA 82	143.139	230.360	Texas state line west of Cameron	Vermilion–Lafayette parish line	1955	current	
LA 83	34.013	54.739	LA 14 in New Iberia	LA 182 in Baldwin	1955	current	
LA 85	7.826	12.595	LA 83 in Lydia	LA 182 in Jeanerette	1955	current	
LA 86	16.436	26.451	LA 182 in New Iberia	LA 31 north of New Iberia	1955	current	
LA 87	42.011	67.610	LA 86 in New Iberia	Centerville	1955	current	
LA 88	5.393	8.679	LA 89 at Lozes	LA 182 northwest of New Iberia	1955	current	
LA 89	12.731	20.489	LA 14 in Delcambre	First Street and Church Street in Youngsville	1955	current	
LA 89-1	5.053	8.132	Iberia Street in Milton	US 90/LA 182 in Lafayette	2013	current	Former LA 89
LA 91	49.58	79.79	Gueydan	LA 13 in Eunice	1955	current	exit 76 on I-10
LA 92	40.723	65.537	US 90 east of Mermentau	LA 339 in Youngsville	1955	current	
LA 92-1	10.188	16.396	Iberia Street and Young Street in Milton	LA 347 south of St. Martinville	2013	current	Former LA 92
LA 93	23.427	37.702	US 90 in Scott	LA 31 in Arnaudville	1955	current	
LA 93-1	1.819	2.927	LA 342 in Lafayette	Rue de Belier near Lafayette	2021	current	Former LA 93
LA 94	7.943	12.783	US 90 and US 167 in Lafayette	LA 328 in Breaux Bridge	1955	current	
LA 95	42.12	67.79	US 90 in Duson	LA 104 in Mamou	1955	current	exit 92 on I-10
LA 96	19.543	31.451	LA 182 in Broussard	LA 352 east of Catahoula	1955	current	
LA 97	21.553	34.686	US 90 and LA 102 in Jennings	US 190 east of Basile	1955	current	
LA 98	47.751	76.848	LA 97 and LA 1123 west of Iota	Lafayette–St. Martin parish line east of Carencro	1955	current	
LA 99	32.438	52.204	LA 14 west of Lake Arthur	US 190 east of Kinder	1955	current	
Former

=== LA 100 to LA 199 ===
Number	Length (mi)	Length (km)	Southern or western terminus	Northern or eastern terminus	Formed	Removed	Notes
LA 100	14.831	23.868	LA 97 in Evangeline	LA 13 in Crowley	1955	current	
LA 101	17.278	27.806	LA 14 in Hayes	LA 383 north of Iowa	1955	current	Was portions of SR 1156, SR 728, SR 744 and SR 24-D (former SR 24 and US 165) before 1955
LA 102	35.367	56.918	US 165 in Fenton	LA 26 north of Lake Arthur	1955	current	Was portions of SR 105, SR 735, SR 2030, SR 702, SR 701/SR 703 and SR 731 before 1955
LA 103	39.388	63.389	US 190 west of Lawtell	LA 31 in Leonville	1955	current	Was portions of SR 571, SR 119, SR 487, SR 214/SR 279 and SR 238 before 1955
LA 104	41.374	66.585	LA 26 southeast of Oberlin	US 190 in Opelousas	1955	current	Was portions of SR 120, SR 26 and SR 219 before 1955
LA 105	38.577	62.084	Krotz Springs	LA 1 in Simmesport	1955	current	
LA 106	24.202	38.949	LA 10 east of Oakdale	LA 29 south of Bunkie	1955	current	Was portions of SR 482 and SR 23 before 1955
LA 107	64.957	104.538	US 71 in Morrow	US 167/LA 28 in Pineville	1955	current	Was portions of SR 92, C-1472, C-1471, SR 5, SR 57 and SR 57-D before 1955
LA 108	24.866	40.018	I-10 in Vinton	US 90 in Sulphur	1955	current	Was portions of SR 381, SR 382 (one portion later became C-2102), SR 104 and C-1352 before 1955; section through Vinton removed around 1982
LA 109	39.931	64.263	US 90/LA 3112 southwest of Vinton	LA 27 at Juanita	1955	current	Was portions of SR 121, SR 143, and SR 287 before 1955
LA 110	25.154	40.481	US 190 in Merryville	US 171/US 190 in Longville	1955	current	
LA 111	45.722	73.582	US 190 in Junction	LA 117 northeast of Leesville	1955	current	Was portions of SR 138, SR 143 and SR 414 before 1955
LA 112	80.899	130.194	US 171/US 190 east of DeRidder	US 71/US 167 in Lecompte	1955	current	
LA 113	54.492	87.696	US 190 in Reeves	US 165 and LA 497 in Glenmora	1955	current	
LA 114	20.86	33.57	LA 1 in Echo	LA 1/LA 451 east of Moreauville	1955	current	Was portions of SR 30, SR 72 and SR 299 before 1955
LA 115	60.70	97.69	LA 106 west of St. Landry	LA 28 north of Deville	1955	current	exit 53 on I-49
LA 116	8.39	13.50	US 165 in Pineville	LA 28 east of Pineville	1955	current	Was SR 309 before 1955
LA 117	41.52	66.82	LA 8 and LA 1213 in Leesville	LA 6 east of Robeline	1955	current	
LA 118	26.89	43.28	US 171 in Florien	Kisatchie	1955	current	
LA 119	28.64	46.09	LA 8 at Flatwoods	LA 1 in Natchez	1955	current	exit 119 on I-49
LA 120	36.24	58.32	US 171 in Zwolle LA 117 in Provencal	South of Robeline LA 1 and LA 494 south of Natchez	1955	current	exit 127 on I-49
LA 121	46.83	75.37	LA 8 at Slagle	LA 1 west of Boyce	1955	current	
LA 122	26.09	41.99	US 71/LA 1239-1 in Montgomery	LA 123 in Dry Prong	1955	current	Was SR 162 and SR 475 before 1955
LA 123	15.97	25.70	LA 8 east of Colfax	US 165 east of Breezy Hill	1955	current	Was SR 617 before 1955
LA 124	91.94	147.96	US 84 east of Winnfield	LA 3102 at Argo	1955	current	
LA 125	12.49	20.10	US 165 in Tullos	US 165 northeast of Olla	1955	current	Was Route C-2113 before 1955; spur to Urania now LA 3259
LA 126	97.87	157.51	LA 9 in Reidhimer	LA 124 north of Jonesville	1955	current	
LA 127	54.68	88.00	Kitterlin Bay	LA 126 east of Sikes	1955	current	
LA 128	42.08	67.72	LA 4 east of Fort Necessity	LA 605/LA 897-4 in St. Joseph	1955	current	
LA 129	32.51	52.32	Red River south of Acme	US 84 west of Ferriday	1955	current	
LA 130	7.34	11.81	LA 135 north of Liddieville	US 425/LA 4/LA 15/LA 17 in Winnsboro	1955	current	Was SR 239 before 1955
LA 131	6.79	10.93	LA 15 at St. Genevieve	US 84/US 425 in Vidalia	1955	current	Was the northern portion of SR 49 before 1955
LA 132	32.91	52.96	LA 133 north of Buckner	LA 17 north of Bakers	1955	current	
LA 133	45.46	73.16	LA 4 northeast of Columbia	US 425 south of Oak Ridge	1955	current	Was a portion of SR 47 before 1955; originally ran to Mer Rouge, but this section became US 425 in 2005; exit 132 on I-20
LA 134	65.68	105.70	US 165 south of Sterlington	US 65 just outside Lake Providence	1955	current	
LA 135	34.22	55.07	LA 4 in Fort Necessity	US 425 south of Rayville	1955	current	
LA 136	3.49	5.62	LA 134 in Fairbanks	US 165/LA 2 in Sterlington	1955	current	Was Route C-1604 before 1955
LA 137	—	—	LA 15 north of Mangham	LA 135	1955	2005	Was SR 47 before 1955, redesignated as US 425
LA 138	12.75	20.52	LA 134 south of Collinston	US 165/US 425/LA 2 in Mer Rouge	1955	current	Was SR 47 and Route C-1557 before 1955
LA 139	20.21	32.52	US 80 in Monroe	US 165/US 425/LA 2/LA 593 in Bastrop	1955	current	Was SR 14 before 1955; originally ran from Bastrop to the Arkansas state line (replacing SR 204), but this section became a portion of US 425 in 1989
LA 140	14.77	23.77	US 425 in Log Cabin	US 165/LA 599 in Bonita	1955	current	Was routes C-1484, C-1485 and C-1486 before 1955
LA 141	4.07	6.55	LA 75 in St. Gabriel St. Gabriel	St. Gabriel LA 75 in St. Gabriel	1955	current	Was SR 410 before 1955; gap in route since the 1990s
LA 142	8.76	14.10	US 425 north of Bastrop	AR 133 at Arkansas state line northwest of Beekman	1955	current	Was Route C-1490 before 1955
LA 143	39.94	64.28	LA 34 in West Monroe	LA 33 in Marion	1955	current	
LA 144	9.97	16.05	LA 34 in Eros	LA 151 at Calhoun	1955	current	
LA 145	17.88	28.78	LA 146 southeast of Ruston	LA 15 northeast of Downsville	1955	current	exit 93 on I-20
LA 146	56.60	91.09	US 79/LA 9 in Homer	LA 4 in Chatham	1955	current	
LA 147	39.76	63.99	LA 34 just north of the Jackson Parish–Winn Parish line	LA 9 in Arcadia	1955	current	
LA 148	15.65	25.19	US 167/LA 818 at Clay Point southwest of Eros	LA 146 at Vernon Ouachita Parish line	1955	current	
LA 149	2.74	4.41	US 80 near Grambling Corners	Parish Road 333 and R.W.E. Jones Drive	1955	current	Was a portion of Route C-1792 before 1955
LA 150	8.83	14.21	US 80/LA 563 in Simsboro	US 80/US 167/LA 146 in Ruston	1955	current	
LA 151	56.15	90.36	US 80/US 80 Truck/LA 9 in Arcadia	LA 546 at Cadeville	1955	current	exit 69 on I-20
LA 152	10.19	16.40	LA 2 east of Lisbon	LA 151 west of Dubach	1955	current	
LA 153	22.57	36.32	LA 9/LA 156 in Creston	LA 4/LA 507 in Castor	1955	current	
LA 154	53.09	85.44	US 71 at Elm Grove	LA 9 and LA 518 in Athens	1955	current	exit 61 on I-20
LA 155	60.60	97.53	US 71/US 371 in Coushatta	LA 146 east of Quitman	1955	current	
LA 156	26.92	43.32	LA 9/ LA 153 in Creston	US 167 north of Winnfield	1955	current	
LA 157	79.37	127.73	US 71 at McDade	LA 159/LA 615 north of Shongaloo	1955	current	exit 33 on I-20
LA 158	6.34	10.20	LA 8 in Colfax	Local road north of Colfax	1955	current	Section south of US 71 was SR 1/SR 5 (later Route C-2116) before 1955
LA 159	31.76	51.11	I-20 and US 371 in Minden	Arkansas state line north of Shongaloo	1955	current	exit 47 on I-20 with US 371
LA 160	34.24	55.10	north of Benton	LA 2/LA 159 at Leton	1955	current	
LA 161	4.30	6.92	LA 2 Alt. in Gordon	AR 15 at Arkansas state line northeast of Gordon	1955	current	Was a portion of SR 557 before 1955
LA 162	9.01	14.50	LA 3 in Benton	LA 157 at Midway	1955	current	
LA 163	9.14	14.71	Lake Bistineau State Park	LA 164 in Doyline	1955	current	
LA 164	12.78	20.57	US 79/US 80 north of Haughton	US 371 in Sibley	1955	current	
LA 166	—	—	Southwest of Doyline	Near Lake Bistineau	1955	1960	
LA 168	7.25	11.67	LA 1 in Rodessa	US 71 in Ida	1955	current	
LA 169	45.92	73.90	LA 172 west of Keachi	US 71 south of Belcher	1955	current	
LA 170	14.23	22.90	Texas state line west of Vivian	US 71/LA 3049 in Gilliam	1955	current	
LA 172	8.48	13.65	Texas state line west of Keachi	LA 5/LA 789 in Keachi	1955	current	
LA 173	19.29	31.04	LA 1 in Shreveport	LA 3049 at Dixie	1955	current	exit 221 on I-49; exit 5 on I-220
LA 174	31.79	51.16	LA 191 west of Converse	LA 1 at Lake End	1955	current	exit 155 on I-49
LA 175	63.93	102.89	US 171 northwest of Many	LA 1 southeast of Shreveport	1955	current	exit 186 on I-49
LA 176	4.74	7.63	US 90/US 167 in Lafayette	LA 98 in Carencro	1955	current	Was SR 675 and Route C-1384 before 1955; originally ran from US 90/US 167 to LA 94, but the section from Simcoe and Surrey Streets to US 90/US 167 became US 167 around 1964; extended to LA 98 (replacing LA 728-1) in 2009
LA 177	17.13	27.57	LA 175 north of Pleasant Hill	US 84/LA 1 at Gahagan	1955	current	exit 162 on I-49 concurrent with US 371
LA 178	10.63	17.11	LA 95 in Church Point	LA 93/LA 182 in Sunset	1955	current	
LA 179	—	—	US 84	US 71 in Coushatta	1955	1994	Became a portion of US 371
LA 180	0.12	0.19	US 71 in Pineville	US 165 in Pineville	1955	current	
LA 181	4.22	6.79	LA 115 in Lone Pine	US 71 in Cheneyville	1955	current	Was the northern portion of SR 271 before 1955
LA 182	174.31	280.52	LA 29 in Whiteville	US 90 north of Raceland	1955	current	Longest 3 digit highway in Louisiana
LA 182-1	—	—	LA 89-1/LA 182 in Lafayette	Bernard Road in Broussard	2015	2022	Former routing of LA 182 through Broussard; transferred to local control
LA 182-2	—	—	De Porres Street in Broussard	LA 182 in Broussard	2015	2022	Former routing of LA 182 through Broussard; transferred to local control
LA 183	9.93	15.98	I-20/Richland PR 202 at Holly Ridge	LA 134 west of Epps	1955	current	exit 145 on I-20
LA 184	3.38	5.44	LA 8/LA 28 east of US 171 in Leesville	Pendleton Drive (Fort Johnson)	1955	current	Was Route C-2040 before 1955
LA 185	—	—	Barksdale Air Force Base in Bossier City	LA 72	1955	2013	Was Route C-1333 before 1955; transferred to local control
LA 191	75.33	121.23	Texas state line west of Leesville	US 84 east of Logansport	1975	current	
Former

=== LA 300 to LA 399 ===
Number	Length (mi)	Length (km)	Southern or western terminus	Northern or eastern terminus	Formed	Removed	Notes
LA 300	15.05	24.22	Delacroix	LA 39 and LA 46 at Sebastopol	1955	current	
LA 301	2.98	4.80	Bayou Villars	LA 45 north of Jean Lafitte	1955	current	Was a portion of SR 1307 before 1955; southern portion now LA 3257
LA 302	0.28	0.45	LA 3257 in Barataria	LA 45 in Jean Lafitte	1955	current	Was Route C-2060 before 1955
LA 303	1.27	2.04	LA 45/LA 3134	Vendome Canal in Jean Lafitte	1955	current	Was SR 1235 before 1955
LA 304	7.05	11.35	LA 308 in Laurel Grove	LA 20 in Chackbay	1955	current	Was SR 486 before 1955
LA 305	—	—	LA 31 near Levert	point northwest of Levert	1955	—	
LA 306	8.58	13.81	Bayou Gauche	LA 631 in Paradis	1955	current	Was SR 669 before 1955
LA 307	19.35	31.14	LA 20 east of Chackbay	LA 182 in Raceland	1955	current	Was SR 486 before 1955
LA 308	82.19	132.27	LA 1 in Golden Meadow	LA 3089 in Donaldsonville	1955	current	
LA 309	8.45	13.60	LA 20 at Chacahoula	LA 1 in Brule	1955	current	Was SR 28 before 1955
LA 310	—	—	LA 1 near Larose	LA 308	1955	2013	Was Route C-2198 before 1955; decommissioned due to completion of LA 657 extension
LA 311	13.62	21.92	LA 182/LA 312/LA 3197 in Houma	LA 24 in Schriever	1955	current	
LA 312	1.24	2.00	LA 182/LA 311/LA 3197	LA 24 in Houma	1955	current	Was SR 1092 (former SR 2) before 1955
LA 313	—	—	LA 353 southwest of Parks	LA 31 near Parks	1955	—	
LA 314	—	—	LA 353 southwest of Parks	LA 31 west of Parks	1955	2004	
LA 315	20.31	32.69	local road south of Theriot	LA 182 and LA 3197 in Houma	1955	current	
LA 316	16.90	27.20	LA 24 in Gray	LA 24 in Bourg	1955	current	
LA 317	17.26	27.78	Burns Point	LA 182 in Centerville	1955	current	Was SR 60 before 1955
LA 318	4.66	7.50	LA 83 west of Baldwin	LA 182 at Sorrel	1955	current	Was SR 912 before 1955
LA 319	8.03	12.92	Cypremort Point	LA 83 in Louisa	1955	current	
LA 320	2.40	3.86	LA 182 in Oliver	LA 86 just south of Bayou Teche	1955	current	
LA 321	3.60	5.79	LA 351 near Ruth	LA 347 north of Parks	1955	current	
LA 322	1.27	2.04	LA 182	LA 87 in Franklin	1955	current	Was SR 900 and Route C-1898 before 1955
LA 323	0.48	0.77	Irish Bend Road	LA 87 at Oaklawn	1955	current	Was Route C-1899 before 1955
LA 324	0.13	0.21	LA 326	LA 87 in Charenton	1955	current	Was a portion of SR 129 before 1955
LA 325	—	—	LA 23 in Venice	LA 23 in Boothville	1955	1970	Was Route C-2168 before 1955
LA 326	3.81	6.13	LA 182 in Baldwin	Chitimacha Trail	—	—	
LA 327	15.36	24.72	LA 75 near St. Gabriel	LA 30 in Baton Rouge	—	—	
LA 328	7.82	12.59	LA 347 in Breaux Bridge	LA 347 in Cecilia	—	—	exit 109 on I-10
LA 329	6.05	9.74	Avery Island	New Iberia	—	—	exit 128B on US 90; westbound exit only
LA 330	17.20	27.68	Abbeville	Delcambre	—	—	
LA 331	6.07	9.77	Boston	Erath	1955	current	
LA 332	3.50	5.63	LA 91 near Gueydan	End state maintenance southwest of Gueydan	1955	current	
LA 333	7.87	12.67	Intracoastal City	Esther	1955	current	
LA 334	—	—	LA 347 east of Breaux Bridge	point southeast of Breaux Bridge	1955	—	
LA 335	17.58	28.29	LA 3093	Abbeville	—	—	
LA 336-1	0.50	0.80	LA 328 in Breaux Bridge	N. Railroad Street in Breaux Bridge	—	—	Follows W. Bridge Street
LA 336-2	0.44	0.71	LA 31 in Breaux Bridge	LA 328 in Breaux Bridge	—	—	Follows E. Refinery Street
LA 337	—	—	Various streets and roads in Catahoula		1955	2004	
LA 338	7.49	12.05	Abbeville	Charon	—	—	
LA 339	13.567	21.834	LA 14 Business in Erath	LA 3073 in Lafayette	1955	current	Was SR 148, SR 680 and SR 236 before 1955
LA 340	—	—	LA 354 north of Anse La Butte	LA 31 northwest of Breaux Bridge	—	—	
LA 341	4.2	6.8	LA 31 opposite Bayou Teche	LA 31	1955	current	Was SR 355 before 1955
LA 342	12.45	20.04	LA 35 south of Rayne	LA 93 in Lafayette	1955	current	
LA 343	29.04	46.74	LA 14 west of Abbeville	LA 356 at Bristol	1955	current	
LA 344	6.44	10.36	Morbihan	Loreauville	—	—	
LA 345	6.54	10.53	Loreauville	St. Martinville	—	—	
LA 346	11.77	18.94	LA 513 in Oxford	LA 177 south of Evelyn	1955	current	
LA 347	40.7	65.5	Daspit	Leonville	—	—	exit 115 on I-10
LA 348	6.82	10.98	LA 549 at Conway	LA 33 southwest of Marion	1955	current	
LA 349	3.44	5.54	Henderson	—	—	—	
LA 350	0.41	0.66	LA 31 in Parks	LA 347 in Parks	1955	current	
LA 351	0.71	1.14	LA 31	LA 347	1955	current	
LA 352	25.79	41.50	Lake Fausse Pointe State Park	Henderson	—	—	
LA 353	12.66	20.37	Lafayette	St. Martinville	—	—	
LA 354	2.31	3.72	LA 94 near Breaux Bridge	LA 31 near Cecilia	—	—	Unsigned since 2015
LA 355	0.24	0.39	LA 31	LA 347	1955	current	
LA 356	5.78	9.30	Church Point	Cankton	—	—	
LA 357	9.51	15.30	Church Point	Opelousas	—	—	
LA 358	15.24	24.53	Prudhomme	Shuteston	—	—	
LA 359	8.81	14.18	Port Barre	Lebeau	—	—	
LA 360	8.30	13.36	Palmetto	Bayou Current	—	—	
LA 361	20.09	32.33	Lebeau	Evergreen	—	—	
LA 362	5.02	8.08	Evergreen	Cottonport	—	—	
LA 363	9.29	14.95	Ville Platte	Grand Prairie	—	—	
LA 364	—	—	LA 1 near Matthews	LA 308	1955	2004	Was Route C-2074 before 1955; decommissioned due to completion of LA 654 extension
LA 365	20.91	33.65	LA 370 east of Iota	LA 98 east of Mire	1955	current	
LA 366	0.80	1.29	US 165	LA 8 in Pollock	1955	current	
LA 367	17.35	27.92	LA 98 near Rayne	US 190 near Eunice	—	—	
LA 368	12.56	20.21	LA 13 near Mowata	LA 97	—	—	
LA 369	—	—	Loop off LA 100 east of Egan		—	—	
LA 370	23.45	37.74	LA 91/LA 98 in Iota	LA 35 in Church Point	—	—	
LA 371	—	—	US 190 in Basile	LA 104 near Basile	1955	1994	Redesignated as LA 3277 to avoid confusion with US 371
LA 372	8.95	14.40	Bond	Oakdale	—	—	
LA 373	—	—	US 167 northwest of Ville Platte	LA 106 east of Bayou Chicot	—	1964	
LA 374	9.97	16.05	LA 3277	Lanse Meg Road	—	—	
LA 375	—	—	LA 373 near Chicot State Park	Lake Chicot	—	1991	
LA 376	19.10	30.74	Bond Road	US 167 near Ville Platte	—	—	
LA 377	14.12	22.72	Grant	Pitkin	—	—	
LA 378	7.96	12.81	I-10 in Westlake	US 171 in Moss Bluff	1955	current	
LA 379	8.01	12.89	Westlake	—	—	—	
LA 380	9.89	15.92	LA 99 south of Welsh	LA 26 in Lake Arthur	1955	current	
LA 381	—	—	LA 99 north of Welsh	local road northwest of Welsh	—	1963	
LA 382	9.38	15.10	LA 380 east of Thornwell	US 90 east of Welsh	1955	current	
LA 383	25.69	41.34	US 90 in Iowa	US 190 in Kinder	—	—	exit 43 on I-10
LA 384	34.33	55.25	Cameron Prairie NWR	Lake Charles	—	—	
LA 385	14.91	24.00	Cameron Parish	Lake Charles	—	—	exit 6 on I-210
LA 386	4.71	7.58	Iberville Parish	—	—	—	
LA 387	—	—	LA 23 in Belle Chasse	End state maintenance near U.S. Naval Ammunition Depot in Belle Chasse	1955	c. 1950	Was a portion of SR 996 before 1955
LA 388	—	—	US 90 near Edgerly	point north of Edgerly	—	—	
LA 389	38.25	61.56	DeQuincy	Merryville	—	—	
LA 390	2.77	4.46	Maggie Hebert Road	LA 27 in Hackberry	1955	current	
LA 391	—	—	LA 108 near Vinton	LA 108 southeast of Vinton	—	—	
LA 392	21.73	34.97	South Toledo Bend State Park	Hornbeck	—	—	
LA 393	—	—	LA 383 north of Iowa	US 165 south of Fenton	—	1963	
LA 394	15.69	25.25	DeRidder	Dry Creek	—	—	
LA 395	19.56	31.48	Roanoke	Elton	—	—	exit 59 on I-10
LA 396	—	—	LA 108 east of Vinton	LA 108 southeast of Vinton	—	—	
LA 397	19.37	31.17	Calcasieu Parish	—	—	—	exit 36 on I-10
LA 398	10.42	16.77	Assumption Parish	Labadieville	—	—	
LA 399	15.54	25.01	LA 112 northwest of Sugartown	Fullerton	1955	current	
Former

=== LA 400 to LA 499 ===
Number	Length (mi)	Length (km)	Southern or western terminus	Northern or eastern terminus	Formed	Removed	Notes
LA 400	5.746	9.247	Attakapas Landing	LA 1 north of Supreme	1955	current	
LA 401	9.407	15.139	Lake Verret in Attakapas Landing	LA 1 in Napoleonville	1955	current	
LA 402	5.070	8.159	Brusle St. Vincent	LA 308 north of Napoleonville	1955	current	
LA 403	2.878	4.632	LA 402 at Brusle St. Vincent	LA 308 at Paincourtville	1955	current	
LA 404	8.230	13.245	LA 75 at Choctaw	LA 69 at Samstown	1955	current	
LA 405	29.346	47.228	LA 1 west of Donaldsonville	LA 1 and LA 75 in Plaquemine	1955	current	
LA 406	6.002	9.659	LA 23 in Belle Chasse	New Orleans	1955	current	
LA 407	2.556	4.113	LA 406	LA 428 in New Orleans	1955	current	
LA 408	12.281	19.764	Baton Rouge	LA 37/LA 64 in Central	1955	current	
LA 409	11.256	18.115	LA 64 in Central	LA 959 at Blairstown	1955	current	
LA 410	8.176	13.158	LA 408	LA 64 in Central	1955	current	Along Blackwater Road
LA 411	11.515	18.532	LA 76 in Rosedale	US 190 and LA 78 in Livonia	1955	current	
LA 412	9.938	15.994	LA 964 west of Slaughter	LA 67 east of Slaughter	1955	current	
LA 413	23.741	38.207	LA 76 south of Erwinville	LA 1 Bus. in New Roads	1955	current	
LA 414	10.550	16.979	LA 413 north of Lakeland	LA 413 at Ventress	1955	current	
LA 415	25.801	41.523	I-10 west of Port Allen	LA 413 east of New Roads	1955	current	
LA 416	7.247	11.663	LA 1 at Knapp	LA 415 at Hermitage	1955	current	
LA 417	24.281	39.076	LA 10 at Red Cross	LA 418 at Legonier	1955	current	
LA 418	21.898	35.241	LA 417 north of Quinton	LA 1 at Legonier	1955	current	
LA 419	7.359	11.843	LA 417 at Quinton	Lacour	1955	current	
LA 420	7.895	12.706	LA 1/LA 10 east of Morganza	LA 10 and LA 10 Bus. north of New Roads	1955	current	
LA 421	15.821	25.461	LA 10 west of Jackson	US 61 north of St. Francisville	1955	current	
LA 422	12.123	19.510	LA 19 in Norwood	LA 67 at Felps	1955	current	
LA 423	2.427	3.906	LA 19	LA 67 between Baton Rouge and Baker	1955	current	Along Thomas Road
LA 424	11.858	19.084	LA 62 north of Pine	LA 62 north of State Line	1955	current	
LA 425	—	—	LA 30 near Gardere	LA 427 in Essen	1955	1961	
LA 426	7.390	11.893	LA 73 in Baton Rouge	US 190 between Baton Rouge and Denham Springs	1955	current	Was a portion of SR 7 (later SR 7-D) from 1921-1955
LA 427	14.574	23.455	LA 73 in Baton Rouge	LA 73 at Hope Villa	1955	current	
LA 428	8.817	14.190	LA 23 near Belle Chasse	LA 407 in New Orleans	1955	current	
LA 429	10.190	16.399	LA 73 west of Gonzales	LA 22 north of Sorrento	1955	current	
LA 430	10.091	16.240	LA 25 in Franklinton	LA 438 at Hackley	1955	current	
LA 431	9.60	15.45	St. Amant	Port Vincent	—	—	
LA 432	8.54	13.74	Woodland	Chipola	—	—	
LA 433	14.83	23.87	US 190 west of Slidell	US 90 east of Slidell	1955	current	
LA 434	10.66	17.16	South of US 190 in Lacombe	LA 36 between Abita Springs and Hickory	1955	current	
LA 435	11.47	18.46	LA 36/LA 59 in Abita Springs	LA 41 in Talisheek	1955	current	
LA 436	26.14	42.07	Franklinton	Varnado	—	—	
LA 437	20.63	33.20	Covington	Zona	—	—	
LA 438	37.78	60.80	Mt. Hermon	Angie	—	—	
LA 439	12.71	20.45	Sheridan	Bogalusa	—	—	
LA 440	27.56	44.35	LA 441 north of Greensburg	LA 10 west of Franklinton	1955	current	exit 57 on I-55
LA 441	43.744	70.399	LA 42 west of Springfield	Mississippi state line north of Easleyville	1955	current	
LA 442	23.22	37.37	LA 63 north of Livingston	LA 40 and LA 443 north of Hammond	1955	current	
LA 443	8.30	13.36	US 190 in Hammond	LA 40 and LA 442 south of Loranger	1955	current	Along Morris Road
LA 444	14.76	23.75	LA 16 in French Settlement	LA 22 in Killian	1955	current	
LA 445	24.58	39.56	LA 22 near Ponchatoula	LA 16 east of Amite	1955	current	
LA 446	—	—	LA 444 near Bayou Barbary	LA 42 near Frost	—	1965	
LA 447	20.19	32.49	LA 16 in Port Vincent	LA 63 north of Walker	1955	current	
LA 448	8.59	13.82	LA 37 north of Grangeville	LA 10 at Darlington	1955	current	
LA 449	23.73	38.19	US 190 in Walker	LA 37 southwest of Greensburg	1955	current	
LA 450	27.69	44.56	Folsom	Mt. Hermon	—	—	
LA 451	30.07	48.39	Moreauville	Hamburg	—	—	
LA 452	13.70	22.05	Marksville	Brouillette	—	—	
LA 453	3.12	5.02	LA 1	LA 107 in Moncla	—	—	
LA 454	13.75	22.13	LA 107 at Cedar Grove	LA 107 and LA 115 in Effie	1955	current	
LA 455	—	—	LA 155 near Deville	LA 28 near Big Saline Bayou	—	1965	
LA 456	7.12	11.46	US 71 at Loyd	LA 470 at Lamourie	1955	current	Former portion of US 71
LA 457	19.62	31.58	Lecompte	Echo	—	—	
LA 458	5.45	8.77	Pitkin	Fullerton	—	—	
LA 459	11.16	17.96	Jena	Aimwell	—	—	
LA 460	7.21	11.60	LA 127 in Nebo	US 84 and LA 8 at Whitehall	1955	current	
LA 461	4.85	7.81	Calcasieu	Hineston	—	—	
LA 462	9.43	15.18	LA 113 near Westport	Junction with Osborne Road	—	—	
LA 463	17.32	27.87	Pitkin	Afeman	—	—	
LA 464	19.80	31.87	Merryville	Caney	—	—	
LA 465	30.77	49.52	Kurthwood	Otis	—	—	
LA 466	0.85	1.37	LA 18 (Lafayette Street) in Gretna	LA 23 (Franklin Avenue)	1972	current	Along 5th and Kepler Streets
LA 466-1	—	—	LA 428 in Algiers	Merrill Street in Algiers	1955	—	Was a portion of SR 996 before 1955; followed Patterson Drive
LA 466-2	—	—	Kepler Street in Gretna	Orleans Parish line	1955	—	Was a portion of SR 30-D before 1955; followed Monroe Street
LA 466-3	—	—	Huey P. Long Avenue in Gretna	Weldman Street in Gretna	1955	—	Was a portion of SR 2-D (later SR 2084) before 1955; followed 1st Street
LA 466-4	—	—	Washington Street in Gretna	Hancock Street in Gretna	1955	—	Was a portion of SR 1241 before 1955; followed Weldman Street
LA 466-5	—	—	Hamilton Street in Gretna	Hancock Street in Gretna	1955	—	Was a portion of SR 1240 before 1955; followed Virgil Street
LA 466-6	—	—	Virgil Street in Gretna	Orleans Parish line	1955	—	Was a portion of SR 1242 before 1955; followed Madison Street
LA 466-7	—	—	Kepler Street in Gretna	Socrates Street in Algiers	1955	1961	Was a portion of SR 30-E before 1955; followed Hancock Street
LA 466-8	—	—	Washington Street in Gretna	Whitney Avenue in Gretna	1955	1962	Was a portion of SR 1239 before 1955; followed Hamilton Street
LA 466-9	—	—	Huey P. Long Avenue in Gretna	Lafayette Street in Gretna	1955	—	Was a portion of Route C-1474 before 1955; followed 2nd Street
LA 466-10	—	—	Lafayette Street in Gretna	Hancock Street in Gretna	1955	1972	Was portions of SR 30-D and SR 30-E before 1955; shortened to LA 23 and renumbered to LA 466
LA 466-11	—	—	7th Street in Gretna	1st Street in Gretna	1955	—	Was a portion of SR 1237 before 1955; followed Lavoisier Street
LA 466-12	—	—	11th Street in Gretna	1st Street in Gretna	1955	—	Was a portion of SR 1238 before 1955; followed Newton Street
LA 466-13	—	—	10th Street in Gretna	5th Street in Gretna	1955	—	Was a portion of SR 451 before 1955; followed Huey P. Long Avenue
LA 466-14	—	—	14th Street in Gretna	1st Street in Gretna	1955	—	Was a portion of SR 456 before 1955; followed Derbigny Street
LA 466-15	—	—	11th Street in Gretna	1st Street in Gretna	1955	—	Was a portion of SR 1236 before 1955; followed Dolhonde Street
LA 466-16	—	—	5th Street in Gretna	2nd Street in Gretna	1955	—	Was a portion of Route C-1474 before 1955; followed Lafayette Street
LA 467	9.18	14.77	US 171 in Leesville	LA 10 in Fort Johnson South	—	—	
LA 468	5.80	9.33	US 171 in Leesville	LA 8	—	—	
LA 469	2.45	3.94	K Avenue in Fort Johnson North	LA 8	—	—	
LA 470	4.21	6.78	Lamourie	Chambers	—	—	
LA 471	17.65	28.40	US 71 north of Colfax	LA 34 west of Atlanta	1955	current	Former portion of SR 5 before 1955
LA 472	20.24	32.57	US 167 at Williana	US 167 southeast of Winnfield	1955	current	Was SR 232 before 1955
LA 473	8.27	13.31	Toro	Hornbeck	—	—	
LA 474	7.82	12.59	Negreet	Florien	—	—	
LA 475	0.63	1.01	LA 191 in Zwolle	LA 482 in Zwolle	—	—	
LA 476	14.05	22.61	LA 191 in Negreet	LA 6	—	—	
LA 477	7.83	12.60	near the Red River in St. Maurice	US 84	—	—	
LA 478	20.87	33.59	Vowells Mill	LA 1 in Natchitoches	1955	current	Was SR 609 and SR 432 before 1955
LA 479	7.78	12.52	Chestnut	Goldonna	—	—	
LA 480	24.5	39.4	Coushatta	Clear Lake	—	—	
LA 481	10.97	17.65	LA 191 at the Sabine Parish line	US 84	—	—	
LA 482	7.47	12.02	Toledo Bend Reservoir	Zwolle	—	—	
LA 483	16.46	26.49	US 171 in Noble	LA 175 in Pelican	1955	current	
LA 484	9.75	15.69	LA 119	LA 494	—	—	
LA 485	17.13	27.57	Robeline	Powhatan	—	—	exit 148 on I-49
LA 486	14.18	22.82	Clarence	Black Lake	—	—	
LA 487	10.00	16.09	Marthaville	Ajax	—	—	
LA 488	17.15	27.60	Lisso	Alexandria	—	—	
LA 489	8.38	13.49	LA 465	Northern boundary at artillery range	—	—	
LA 490	14.96	24.08	Janie	Red River east of Marco	1955	current	Was SR 431 before 1955
LA 491	7.28	11.72	LA 495 near Cloutierville	Local road at top of levee near Odra	—	—	
LA 492	5.61	9.03	LA 8 south of Colfax	US 71 at Bagdad	1955	current	Former portion of US 71
LA 493	5.81	9.35	Montrose	Melrose	—	—	
LA 494	15.07	24.25	Cypress	Natchitoches	—	—	
LA 495	4.28	6.89	LA 1 near Cloutierville	LA 1	—	—	
LA 496	10.67	17.17	LA 121 at McNutt	US 71/US 165/LA 28 in Alexandria	1955	current	
LA 497	8.39	13.50	Glenmora	Forest Hill	—	—	
LA 498	5.12	8.24	Old Boyce Road	US 71/US 165 in Alexandria	—	—	exit 90 on I-49
LA 499	31.80	51.18	Joyce	Zoar	—	—	
Former

=== LA 500 to LA 599 ===
Number	Length (mi)	Length (km)	Southern or western terminus	Northern or eastern terminus	Formed	Removed	Notes
LA 500	24.59	39.57	US 167 at Packton	US 84 west of Jena	1955	current	
LA 501	30.75	49.49	Winnfield	Friendship	—	—	
LA 502	1.52	2.45	US 165	LA 500 in Georgetown	1955	current	
LA 503	8.75	14.08	Summerville	Nickel	—	—	
LA 504	4.28	6.89	Natchitoches	—	—	—	
LA 505	25.24	40.62	US 167 at Tannehill	LA 4 in Weston	1955	current	
LA 506	18.35	29.53	LA 124 in LaSalle Parish	Hebron Rd in Caldwell Parish	—	—	
LA 507	60.38	97.17	Messick	Simsboro	—	—	exit 77 on I-20
LA 508	6.81	10.96	Bienville	—	—	—	
LA 509	16.40	26.39	Mansfield	Westdale	—	—	exit 177 on I-49
LA 510	9.46	15.22	De Soto Parish	—	—	—	
LA 511	17.92	28.84	Greenwood	Bossier City	—	—	
LA 512	6.01	9.67	Benson	Pelican	—	—	
LA 513	14.86	23.91	Pelican	Mansfield	—	—	
LA 514	12.19	19.62	East Point	Womack	—	—	
LA 515	11.72	18.86	Red River Parish	Bossier Parish	—	—	
LA 516	20.41	32.85	Ringgold	Bryceland	—	—	
LA 517	6.03	9.70	Mount Lebanon	Bryceland	—	—	
LA 518	29.67	47.75	Minden	Lisbon	—	—	
LA 519	9.00	14.48	Arcadia	Marsalis	—	—	
LA 520	16.18	26.04	US 79 in Homer	LA 161 northeast of Gordon	1955	current	
LA 521	10.43	16.79	Leton	Millerton	—	—	
LA 522	3.80	6.12	Mansfield	—	—	—	
LA 523	5.88	9.46	LA 1	LA 511 in Shreveport	1955	current	
LA 524	9.88	15.90	US 165 north of Pollock	North of LA 123 in Breezy Hill	1955	current	
LA 525	10.05	16.17	Spring Ridge	Shreveport	—	—	
LA 526	15.99	25.73	I-20/US 79/US 80 in Shreveport	LA 511 in Shreveport	—	—	
LA 527	13.55	21.81	US 71 at Taylortown	LA 163 south of Lake Bistineau State Park	1955	current	
LA 528	11.20	18.02	Bossier Parish	Dixie Inn	—	—	
LA 529	6.74	10.85	Ivan	—	—	—	
LA 530	10.23	16.46	Oil City	Belcher	—	—	exit 228 on I-49
LA 531	14.45	23.26	Heflin	Minden	—	—	exit 49 on I-20
LA 532	5.15	8.29	Dubberly	Nine Forks	—	—	exit 52 on I-20
LA 533	7.44	11.97	Claiborne Parish	—	—	—	
LA 534	20.40	32.83	Kisatchie National Forest	Haynesville	—	—	
LA 535	—	—	LA 2 near Leton LA 157 south of Old Shongaloo	LA 2 Alt. near Shongaloo Arkansas state line	—	1964	
LA 536	—	—	LA 2 south of Mot	LA 157 east of Carterville	—	1964	
LA 537	11.82	19.02	Plain Dealing	—	—	—	
LA 538	23.41	37.67	Shreveport	Caddo	—	—	
LA 539	—	—	LA 174 near Hunter	LA 481 north of Lula	—	1994	
LA 540	8.19	13.18	Ruple	Homer	—	—	
LA 541	9.72	15.64	LA 18 in Avondale	LA 18 in Harvey	1955	current	
LA 542	8.30	13.36	Jonesboro	—	—	—	
LA 543	4.42	7.11	Rogers	Vaughn	—	—	
LA 544	15.39	24.77	Western Lincoln Parish	Ruston	—	—	exit 84 on I-20
LA 545	17.60	28.32	Lincoln Parish	—	—	—	
LA 546	10.75	17.30	LA 34 northeast of Eros	US 80 and LA 15 west of Monroe	1955	current	
LA 547	3.06	4.92	Clarks	—	—	—	
LA 548	7.79	12.54	Chatham	—	—	—	
LA 549	15.54	25.01	LA 15 north of Farmerville	Arkansas state line north of Oakland	1955	current	
LA 550	18.89	30.40	LA 2 east of Bernice	Arkansas state line north of Laran	1955	current	
LA 551	9.33	15.02	LA 33 in Marion	LA 549 in Oakland	1955	current	
LA 552	12.27	19.75	Union Parish	—	—	—	
LA 553	12.82	20.63	US 165 in Monroe	LA 2 in Sterlington	1955	current	
LA 554	8.02	12.91	US 165 and LA 2 at Perryville	LA 138 southwest of Collinston	1955	current	
LA 555	12.38	19.92	Franklin Parish	—	—	—	
LA 556	8.05	12.96	Choudrant	Indian Village	—	—	
LA 557	14.72	23.69	Vixen	Summit	—	—	
LA 558	5.94	9.56	LA 15 in Mount Union	Arkansas state line at Lockhart	1955	current	Along Iron Mountain Road
LA 559	13.83	22.26	Enterprise	Columbia	—	—	
LA 560-1	—	—	New Orleans and Gulf Coast Railway tracks	LA 541 in Marrero	1955	2010	
LA 560-2	0.17	0.27	LA 18 in Marrero	LA 541	1955	current	
LA 560-3	—	—	LA 45 in Marrero	LA 18	1955	2010	
LA 560-4	0.85	1.37	LA 45/LA 3134 bridge over Bayou Barataria at Crown Point	LA 45	1955	current	Was SR 1306 before 1955
LA 561	11.78	18.96	Hebert	Richland Parish	—	—	
LA 562	26.80	43.13	Fort Necessity	Wisner	—	—	
LA 563	13.38	21.53	Simsboro	—	—	—	exit 78 on I-20
LA 564	4.86	7.82	Catahoula Parish	—	—	—	
LA 565	28.54	45.93	Wildsville	Deer Park	—	—	
LA 566	30.09	48.43	US 84 at Elkhorn	LA 568/LA 570 south of Waterproof	1955	current	
LA 567	3.26	5.25	Lee Bayou	—	—	—	
LA 568	32.5	52.3	Ferriday	Avondale	—	—	
LA 569	12.24	19.70	Spokane	Lake St. John	—	—	
LA 570	4.16	6.69	Waterproof	—	—	—	
LA 571	12.13	19.52	LA 566 north of Clayton	LA 566 west of Waterproof	1955	current	
LA 572	10.33	16.62	Gilbert	Talbot Landing	—	—	
LA 573	21.35	34.36	Goldman	Saranac	1955	current	
LA 574-1	0.66	1.06	Collins Lane in Grand Isle	Caminada Bay	1955	current	
LA 574-2	—	—	Gulf of Mexico	LA 1 in Grand Isle	1955	1987	
LA 574-3	0.41	0.66	LA 1 in Grand Isle	Bayou Rigaud	1955	current	
LA 574-4	0.40	0.64	LA 1 in Grand Isle	Bayou Rigaud	1955	current	
LA 574-5	0.31	0.50	LA 1 in Grand Isle	Medical Ave	1955	current	
LA 574-6	0.31	0.50	LA 1 in Grand Isle	Bayou Rigaud	1955	current	
LA 574-7	0.25	0.40	LA 1 in Grand Isle	Louisiana Avenue	1955	current	
LA 574-8	0.28	0.45	LA 1 in Grand Isle	Louisiana Avenue	1955	current	
LA 574-9	0.18	0.29	LA 1 in Grand Isle	Wolkpak Avenue	1955	current	
LA 574-10	—	—	LA 1 in Grand Isle	Louisiana Avenue	1955	1972	Renumbered to LA 3150
LA 574-11	—	—	LA 1 in Grand Isle	LA 1 in Grand Isle	1955	1972	Renumbered to LA 3151
LA 574-12	—	—	LA 1 in Grand Isle	Barataria Pass	1955	—	
LA 575	14.82	23.85	Newellton	Somerset	—	—	
LA 576	17.08	27.49	Charlieville	Mangham	—	—	
LA 577	61.20	98.49	Baskin	Darnell	—	—	exit 157 on I-20
LA 578	7.71	12.41	Crowville	—	—	—	
LA 579	12.86	20.70	Waverly	Monticello	—	—	
LA 580	12.30	19.79	Monticello	Alsatia	—	—	
LA 581	6.94	11.17	Waddell	Transylvania	—	—	
LA 582	16.93	27.25	Redwing	Lake Providence	—	—	
LA 583	10.47	16.85	Bee Bayou	Hegwood Island	—	—	exit 141 on I-20
LA 584	8.01	12.89	LA 135	East of LA 3048	1955	current	
LA 585	46.48	74.80	LA 134 west of Epps	US 65 at Gassoway	1955	current	
LA 586	7	11	Concord	Terry	—	—	
LA 587	4.63	7.45	Oak Grove	—	—	—	
LA 588	17.40	28.00	East Carroll Parish	—	—	—	
LA 589	12.99	20.91	East Carroll Parish	—	—	—	
LA 590	5.85	9.41	Morehouse Parish	—	—	—	
LA 591	9.04	14.55	Morehouse Parish	—	—	—	
LA 592	3.88	6.24	Bastrop	—	—	—	
LA 593	17.23	27.73	LA 138 in Collinston	US 425 north of Bastrop	1955	current	
LA 594	13.54	21.79	LA 15 in Monroe	LA 139 in Swartz	1955	current	
LA 595	3.41	5.49	US 80 and LA 133 in Start	Richland–Morehouse parish line	1955	current	
LA 596	10.70	17.22	US 65 in Lake Providence	US 65 at Panola	1955	current	
LA 597	2.04	3.28	Forest	—	—	—	
LA 598	—	—	US 165 in Bonita	LA 596 southeast of Wainwright	—	1974	
LA 599	13.14	21.15	Morehouse Parish	—	—	—	
Former

=== LA 600 to LA 699 ===
Number	Length (mi)	Length (km)	Southern or western terminus	Northern or eastern terminus	Formed	Removed	Notes
LA 600	4.74	7.63	Parhams	Lismore	—	—	
LA 601	1.713	2.757	Crothers Drive in Richmond	US 65 in Tallulah	1976	current	
LA 602	—	—	US 80 in Richmond	US 80 in Mound	1960	2013	Section between I-20 exits 173 and 182 removed; remaining sections became LA 602-1 and LA 602-2
LA 602-1	1.913	3.079	I-20 in Richmond	US 80 in Richmond	2013	current	Former LA 602; exit 173 on I-20
LA 602-2	0.935	1.505	I-20 in Mound	US 80 in Mound	2013	current	Former LA 602; exit 182 on I-20
LA 603	19.34	31.12	Quimby	Richmond	—	—	
LA 604	9.22	14.84	St. Joseph	Lake Bruin	—	—	
LA 605	19.63	31.59	LA 128 and LA 897-1 in St. Joseph	US 65 north of Newellton	1955	current	
LA 606	10.32	16.61	Lake Bruin	—	—	—	
LA 607	0.19	0.31	US 65	LA 605 north of Lake Bruin	1955	current	
LA 608	21.77	35.04	Lake St. Joseph	Balmoral	—	—	
LA 609	3.76	6.05	Dunn	—	—	—	exit 148 on I-20
LA 610	9.79	15.76	Swampers	—	—	—	
LA 611-1	2.5	4.0	Jefferson Heights Avenue in Jefferson	Jefferson Parish/Orleans Parish Line	1955	current	Was most of SR 459 and SR 1232 before 1955
LA 611-2	—	—	LA 611-1 in Jefferson	US 90/LA 48	1955	2010	Was SR 1234 before 1955; now Central Avenue
LA 611-3	0.34	0.55	LA 611-1 in Jefferson	US 90	1955	current	Originally ran to US 61, but shortened to a rail line in 1957; shortened again in 1984 due to LA 3139 extension; section north of the rail line became LA 3261 in 2002
LA 611-4	—	—	LA 611-1 in Jefferson	Dead end at New Orleans Public Belt Railroad tracks south of LA 3139 (Earhart Expressway)	1955	2010	Was SR 1231 before 1955; one portion became LA 3262 in 2002; now Labarre Road
LA 611-5	—	—	LA 611-1 in Jefferson	US 90	1955	2010	Was SR 1233 before 1955; now Brooklyn Avenue
LA 611-6	—	—	US 90	Former LA 611-5 (Brooklyn Avenue)	1955	2010	Was SR 1243D (later SR 1795) before 1955; now Cicero Avenue
LA 611-7	—	—	LA 611-1 in Jefferson	US 90	1955	1974	Was SR 1274 before 1955; now Dakin Street
LA 611-8	—	—	LA 611-1 in Jefferson	US 90	1955	2010	Was SR 458 before 1955; now Monticello Avenue
LA 611-9	3.6	5.8	US 61 (Airline Drive) and Severn Avenue in Metairie	I-10 at Pontchartrain Boulevard in New Orleans	1955	current	Was SR 1 from 1921-1926 and US 61 from 1926 to 1928-1929 and again from 1933-1935
LA 611-10	—	—	US 61 in Metairie	West Metairie Avenue	1955	1972	Was SR 1245 before 1955; became LA 3152
LA 611-11	—	—	US 61 in Metairie	West Metairie Avenue	1955	1972	Was SR 1246 before 1955; became LA 3153
LA 611-12	—	—	LA 48 in Harahan	US 61 in Metairie	1955	1972	Became LA 3154
LA 611-13	—	—	Russell Street in River Ridge	US 61 in Metairie	1955	1972	Was SR 2220 before 1955; became LA 3155
LA 612	3.60	5.79	Bossier City	Sligo	—	—	
LA 613-1	—	—	Chickasaw Street in Bucktown	17th Street Canal Bridge at the Jefferson Parish-Orleans Parish line	1955	2010	Was portions of SR 33 and Route C-1337 before 1955
LA 613-2	—	—	South Carrollton Avenue	N.O. Hammond Highway at West End	1955	c. 1957	Was a portion of SR 33 before 1955
LA 613-3	—	—	Dreux Avenue in New Orleans	Southline Drive, now Leon C. Simon Drive	1955	c. 1950	Was a portion of Route C-1452 before 1955
LA 613-4	—	—	Old Gentilly Road in New Orleans	US 90 (Chef Menteur Highway)	1955	c. 1950	
LA 614	5.71	9.19	Haughton	—	—	—	
LA 615	10.34	16.64	LA 157 and LA 159 north of Shongaloo	US 79 in Haynesville	1955	current	
LA 616	6.20	9.98	Claiborne	West Monroe	—	—	
LA 617	3.33	5.36	West Monroe	—	—	—	exit 114 on I-20
LA 618	5.92	9.53	Winnsboro	—	—	—	
LA 619	—	—	LA 46 in Shell Beach	Dead end near Doulluts Canal east of Shell Beach	1955	1960	Was Route C-1492 before 1955
LA 620	7.06	11.36	LA 413 in Erwinville	LA 415 northwest of Port Allen	1955	current	Was a portion of SR 30 before 1955
LA 621	6.81	10.96	LA 73 in Prairieville	LA 431 at Brignac	1955	current	
LA 622	4.83	7.77	Mangham	—	—	—	
LA 623	4.94	7.95	Ball	—	—	—	
LA 624	5.80	9.33	LA 46 in Yscloskey	End state maintenance southwest of Mississippi River Gulf Outlet Canal	1955	current	
LA 625	0.25	0.40	LA 46	Dead end at Bayou Yscloskey	1955	current	Along Maple Street, was Route C-2073 before 1955
LA 626	2.56	4.12	LA 48 in St. Rose	US 61 at the northeast corner of Destrehan	1955	current	Along St. Rose Avenue
LA 627	1.14	1.83	LA 48 near Norco	US 61 (Airline Highway)	1955	current	Along Prospect Avenue, was SR 682 before 1955
LA 628	8.04	12.94	LA 44 in LaPlace	US 61 in Montz	1955	current	
LA 629	—	—	LA 18 in Killona	Texas and Pacific Railway crossing	1955	c. 1960	Was SR 659 before 1955
LA 630	—	—	Texas and Pacific Railway crossing	LA 18 in Killona	1955	c. 1957	Was SR 660 before 1955
LA 631	9.0	14.5	US 90 in Des Allemands	LA 52 in Boutte	1955	current	
LA 632	5.63	9.06	LA 631 in Des Allemands	Paradis Canal in Bayou Gauche	1955	current	
LA 633	2.78	4.47	Local road at Grand Bayou	US 90 and LA 52 in Boutte	1955	current	Along Magnolia Ridge Road
LA 634	—	—	US 90	LA 631 near Des Allemands	1955	c. 1960	Was Route C-1522 before 1955
LA 635	0.26	0.42	LA 631 (Old Spanish Trail) near Des Allemands	US 90	1955	current	Was Route C-1520 before 1955
LA 636-1	0.74	1.19	LA 628 in LaPlace	US 61	1955	current	
LA 636-2	—	—	—	—	1955	1981	
LA 636-3	1.66	2.67	LA 44 in LaPlace	LA 628	1955	current	
LA 637	1.48	2.38	LA 44 (River Road)	US 61 (Airline Highway) in Reserve	1955	current	Along West 10th Street
LA 637-1	—	—	—	—	—	1976	
LA 637-2	—	—	—	—	—	—	
LA 637-3	—	—	—	—	—	—	
LA 637-4	—	—	—	—	—	—	
LA 637-5	—	—	—	—	—	—	
LA 637-6	—	—	—	—	—	—	
LA 638	—	—	—	—	—	—	
LA 639	0.40	0.64	North of Union Pacific rail line	LA 18 west of Edgard	1955	current	Unsigned since 2015
LA 640	2.37	3.81	LA 3127 in Edgard	LA 44 and LA 53 in Reserve	1955	current	
LA 641	6.9	11.1	LA 44 in Lutcher	I-10 north of Gramercy	1955	current	
LA 642	3.75	6.04	LA 44 at Remy	End state maintenance northeast of C. Louque Street	1955	current	
LA 643	2.854	4.593	LA 20	Lower Vacherie, near the St. James–St. John the Baptist parish line	1955	current	
LA 644	1.76	2.83	LA 20	LA 643 in Lower Vacherie	1955	current	
LA 645	—	—	Labadieville	—	1955	2021	
LA 646	—	—	LA 308 near Thibodaux	End state maintenance at Lafourche-Assumption parish line	1955	1975	Was Route C-1338 before 1955
LA 647	—	—	LA 20 in Chackbay	Sanchez Road	1955	1964	
LA 648	2.343	3.771	LA 20 south of Thibodaux	LA 308 east of Thibodaux	1955	current	
LA 649	0.070	0.113	LA 1	LA 308 in St. Charles	1955	current	Was Route C-2137 before 1955
LA 650	—	—	LA 316 near Gray	LA 24 near Schriever	1955	1980	
LA 651	—	—	LA 308 near Raceland	Texas and New Orleans Railroad crossing	1955	1975	Was SR 891 before 1955
LA 652	3.72	5.99	Bayou Cut Off	LA 182 in Raceland	1955	current	
LA 653	2.58	4.15	Eagle Island Road south of Bayou du Mar	LA 182 in Raceland	1955	current	
LA 654	5.51	8.87	LA 1 in Mathews	Company Canal bridge northwest of Gheens	1955	current	
LA 655	—	—	Main and Vacherie Streets in Lockport	LA 308 in Rita	1955	2019	
LA 656	—	—	LA 316 (Bayou Blue Road) along the remains of Lake Long Bayou	West of the Company Canal and Lake Long	1955	1993	Was Route C-1798 before 1955
LA 657	2.51	4.04	LA 3235 in Larose	End state maintenance north of Pump Station 7 Road	1955	current	
LA 658	—	—	LA 20 near Schriever	LA 20	1955	1973	Was Route C-1982 before 1955
LA 659	4.42	7.11	LA 24 in Houma	LA 24 at Presquille	1955	current	
LA 660	8.32	13.39	LA 24 in Gray	LA 316 northeast of Houma	1955	current	Along Coteau Road
LA 661	2.61	4.20	LA 315 south of Houma	LA 24 in Houma	1955	current	
LA 662	11.2	18.0	Begin state maintenance on Oilfield Road	LA 183 in Zacarter	1955	current	
LA 663	1.87	3.01	Bayou L'Ourse	—	—	—	
LA 664	0.82	1.32	LA 311 (Little Bayou Black Drive)	Houma–Bayou Cane line	1955	current	Was Route C-2190 before 1955
LA 665	9.88	15.90	LA 55 in Montegut	Dead end at Cutoff Canal	1955	current	
LA 666	—	—	North city limits of Berwick	US 90 near Glenwild	—	1961	
LA 667	—	—	—	—	—	1961	
LA 668	6.58	10.59	Julien	Jeanerette	—	—	
LA 669	—	—	—	—	—	—	
LA 670	0.24	0.39	LA 182 in Adeline	LA 87	1955	current	
LA 671	1.71	2.75	LA 668 between Jeanerette and unincorporated Iberia Parish	LA 87	1955	current	
LA 672	—	—	—	—	—	—	
LA 673	0.73	1.17	M.A. Patout & Son, a sugar mill	LA 85	1955	current	
LA 674	11.58	18.64	Jeanerette	New Iberia	—	—	
LA 675	4.07	6.55	New Iberia	—	—	—	
LA 676	2.56	4.12	Charlotte	Norbert	—	—	
LA 677	3.86	6.21	New Iberia	Morbihan	—	—	
LA 678	4.70	7.56	Cecilia	—	—	—	
LA 679	7.20	11.59	Coteau Holmes	—	—	—	
LA 680	4.49	7.23	St. Martin Parish	Iberia Parish	—	—	
LA 681	—	—	—	—	—	—	
LA 682	2.20	3.54	Jefferson Island	—	—	—	
LA 683	—	—	—	—	—	—	
LA 684	—	—	—	—	—	—	
LA 685	7.70	12.39	Tigre Lagoon	Erath	—	—	
LA 686	7.78	12.52	Cecilia	Arnaudville	—	—	
LA 687	—	—	—	—	—	1964	
LA 688	1.38	2.22	LA 689 near Henry	LA 331 near Boston	1955	current	
LA 689	0.50	0.80	LA 688 near Henry	LA 330	1955	current	
LA 690	2.62	4.22	Mouton Cove	—	—	—	
LA 691	—	—	—	—	—	1993	
LA 692	—	—	—	—	—	1993	
LA 693	—	—	—	—	1955	c. 2018	
LA 694	3.42	5.50	Perry	—	—	—	
LA 695	3.05	4.91	Nunez	—	—	—	
LA 696	9.12	14.68	LA 35 in Kaplan	US 167 north of Abbeville	1955	current	
LA 697	3.557	5.724	LA 343	US 167 north of Abbeville	1955	current	
LA 698	—	—	—	—	—	—	
LA 699	12.04	19.38	LA 92 north of Kaplan	US 167 south of Maurice	1955	current	
Former

=== LA 700 to LA 799 ===
Number	Length (mi)	Length (km)	Southern or western terminus	Northern or eastern terminus	Formed	Removed	Notes
LA 700	10.69	17.20	LA 35 north of Kaplan	LA 342	1955	current	
LA 701	—	—	—	—	—	—	
LA 702	—	—	—	—	—	—	
LA 703	—	—	—	—	—	—	
LA 704	—	—	—	—	—	1961	
LA 705	1.66	2.67	Acadia Parish line	LA 35 west of Indian Bayou	1955	current	
LA 706	—	—	—	—	—	—	
LA 707	—	—	—	—	—	1993	
LA 708	3.84	6.18	Kaplan	—	—	—	
LA 709	—	—	—	—	—	1998	
LA 710	—	—	—	—	—	1998	
LA 711	2.02	3.25	Gueydan	—	—	—	
LA 712	2.00	3.22	LA 14 in Wright	Tom Road	1955	current	Was Route C-1574 before 1955
LA 713	3.55	5.71	Gueydan	—	—	—	
LA 714	2.18	3.51	Riceville	—	—	—	
LA 715	—	—	—	—	—	—	
LA 716	—	—	—	—	—	1993	
LA 717	11.84	19.05	LA 14 west of Gueydan	LA 14 south of Lake Arthur	1955	current	
LA 718	—	—	—	—	—	1990	
LA 719	5.23	8.42	LA 342 west of Ridge	US 90 in Duson	1955	current	
LA 720	5.06	8.14	Acadia Parish line	LA 343 south of Duson	1955	current	
LA 721	—	—	—	—	—	1990	
LA 722	—	—	—	—	—	1977	
LA 723	9.24	14.87	Ossun	Lafayette	—	—	
LA 724	11.40	18.35	Lafayette	Ossun	—	—	
LA 725	1.02	1.64	Lafayette	—	—	—	
LA 726	1.13	1.82	LA 182	I-49 and US 167 in Carencro	1955	current	
LA 727	—	—	—	—	—	1966	
LA 728-1	—	—	—	—	—	2009	
LA 728-2	0.37	0.60	—	—	—	—	
LA 728-3	0.29	0.47	—	—	—	—	
LA 728-4	—	—	—	—	—	2009	
LA 728-5	—	—	—	—	—	2009	
LA 728-6	—	—	—	—	—	2009	
LA 728-7	—	—	—	—	—	2009	
LA 728-8	—	—	—	—	—	2009	
LA 729	0.73	1.17	US 90 Business	US 90 in Lafayette	1955	current	
LA 730	—	—	—	—	—	—	
LA 731	—	—	Kol Drive in Broussard	LA 182-2 in Broussard	1955	2021	
LA 732	—	—	—	—	—	—	
LA 733	4.41	7.10	Milton	Lafayette	—	—	
LA 734	—	—	—	—	1955	2013	
LA 735	—	—	—	—	—	—	
LA 736	—	—	—	—	—	2002	
LA 737	3.00	4.83	Coteau Rodaire	Portage	—	—	
LA 738	—	—	—	—	—	—	
LA 739	—	—	—	—	—	—	
LA 740	0.43	0.69	LA 347 in Arnaudville	Northern town limits	1955	current	
LA 741	6.68	10.75	Leonville	Port Barre	—	—	
LA 742	5.07	8.16	Opelousas	Port Barre	—	—	
LA 743	8.42	13.55	Gibbs	Washington	—	—	
LA 744	0.75	1.21	I-49 and US 167	LA 743 southeast of Washington	1955	current	
LA 745	3.32	5.34	Washington	Beggs	—	—	
LA 746	1.59	2.56	Dead end at Camp Thistlethwaite	LA 745 north of Washington	1955	current	
LA 747	—	—	—	—	—	—	
LA 748	5.77	9.29	Ville Platte	Grand Prairie	—	—	
LA 749	4.27	6.87	Opelousas	—	—	—	
LA 750	—	—	US 190 near Swords	LA 35 near Lawtell	1955	c. 1957	
LA 751	5.726	9.215	LA 35	LA 752 north of Church Point	1955	current	
LA 752	5.361	8.628	US 190 at Swords	LA 35 south of Lawtell	1955	current	
LA 753	—	—	LA 357	US 167 near Opelousas	1955	c. 1957	
LA 754	7.793	12.542	LA 95 south of Church Point	LA 182 west of Sunset	1955	current	
LA 755	5.143	8.277	LA 368 south of Eunice	LA 91 in Eunice	1955	current	
LA 756-1	—	—	—	—	1955	c. 1957	
LA 756-2	—	—	—	—	1955	c. 1957	
LA 756-3	—	—	—	—	1955	c. 1957	
LA 757	7.573	12.188	LA 3277 northeast of Basile	LA 91 in Eunice	1955	current	
LA 758	4.642	7.471	US 190/LA 95 and LA 95 Spur east of Eunice	LA 95 south of Chataignier	1955	current	
LA 759	0.492	0.792	Bourque Road	LA 357 in Lewisburg	1955	current	
LA 760-1	1.215	1.955	LA 93	Schools of the Sacred Heart in Grand Coteau	1955	current	
LA 760-2	0.823	1.324	LA 182 (Napoleon Avenue) in Sunset	LA 93 (East Martin Luther King, Jr. Drive) in Sunset	1955	current	
LA 761	2.538	4.085	LA 365 southwest of Cankton	LA 93 south of Cankton	1955	current	
LA 762	—	—	—	—	1955	c. 1957	
LA 763	2.348	3.779	LA 191 south of Stanley	US 84 in Stanley	1955	current	
LA 764	3.669	5.905	US 84 in Logansport	Marshall Road and State Line Road	1955	current	Along Marshall Road
LA 765	2.208	3.553	Texas state line	LA 764 north of Logansport	1955	current	
LA 766	—	—	LA 172 in Keachi	Keachi Road	1955	1961	
LA 767	0.402	0.647	LA 169	LA 538 in Mooringsport	1955	current	
LA 768	—	—	—	—	1955	1969	
LA 769	—	—	LA 1 in Myrtis	US 71 in Mira	1955	1970	
LA 770	1.892	3.045	Troyville (or Rebel) Road and Industrial Park 30	LA 127 south of Olla	1955	current	
LA 771	4.516	7.268	LA 503	End state maintenance north of Jena	1955	current	
LA 772	10.623	17.096	LA 8 west of Jena	Routon Road and Pritchard Road	1955	current	
LA 773	3.117	5.016	Alonzo Road	LA 8 southwest of Jena	1955	current	
LA 774	1.844	2.968	LA 8	LA 773 southwest of Jena	1955	current	
LA 775	—	—	LA 774	LA 773 near Jena	1955	1973	
LA 776	3.834	6.170	Rock Bar Road and Russell's Landing Road	LA 127 east of Catahoula Lake	1955	current	
LA 777	1.022	1.645	Indian Bluff Road south of Jena	LA 127	1955	current	
LA 778	3.167	5.097	US 84 in Midway	LA 127 in Jena	1955	current	
LA 779	—	—	New Union Church	US 165 near Tullos	1955	c. 1957	
LA 780	—	—	LA 168 near Ida	US 71 near Ida	1955	c. 1957	
LA 781	—	—	US 190	LA 104 near Opelousas	1955	c. 1957	
LA 782-1	—	—	—	—	1955	2000	
LA 782-2	1.54	2.48	—	—	1955	current	
LA 782-3	—	—	—	—	1955	1967	
LA 783	16.756	26.966	US 71 north of Coushatta	US 371 south of Ringgold	1955	current	
LA 784	6.353	10.224	US 71/US 84 east of Coushatta	LA 507 south of Martin	1955	current	
LA 785	—	—	LA 538 near Blanchard	Between Fish Lake and Egan Lake	1955	c. 1957	
LA 786	5.125	8.248	US 371 west of Martin	LA 507 in Martin	1955	current	
LA 787	3.542	5.700	LA 507 south of Martin	LA 155 in Martin	1955	current	
LA 788	2.280	3.669	LA 514 in Hall Summit	US 371 southeast of Hall Summit	1955	current	
LA 789	8.687	13.980	LA 5 and LA 172 in Keachi	LA 169 south of Spring Ridge	1955	current	
LA 790	3.808	6.128	LA 4	US 371 south of Ringgold	1955	current	
LA 791	—	—	Webster–Bienville parish line	LA 7 north of Ringgold	1955	c. 1957	
LA 792	15.852	25.511	LA 4 in Castor	LA 531 in Heflin	1955	current	
LA 793	5.247	8.444	Black Lake Bottom Road	LA 154 southeast of Mount Lebanon	1955	current	
LA 794	7.218	11.616	LA 793 southwest of Mount Lebanon	LA 154 in Gibsland	1955	current	
LA 795	4.492	7.229	LA 793 southwest of Mount Lebanon	LA 154 north of Mount Lebanon	1955	current	
LA 796	2.897	4.662	LA 508	LA 155 east of Bienville	1955	current	
LA 797	3.792	6.103	LA 507 northeast of Bienville	LA 147 east of Bryceland	1955	current	
LA 798-1	0.230	0.370	US 80/LA 9 and LA 519 at Beech Street in Arcadia	LA 151	1955	current	Co-signed as US 80 Truck
LA 798-2	1.651	2.657	LA 9 in Arcadia	LA 151	1955	current	
LA 798-3	0.458	0.737	—	—	1955	current	
LA 799	0.158	0.254	US 80 and LA 154	US 80 in Gibsland	1955	current	
LA 799-1	—	—	—	—	1955	1957	
LA 799-2	—	—	—	—	1955	1957	
Former

=== LA 800 to LA 899 ===
Number	Length (mi)	Length (km)	Southern or western terminus	Northern or eastern terminus	Formed	Removed	Notes
LA 800	—	—	intersection with two local roads	LA 163 south of Doyline	1955	c. 1957	Now part of LA 527
LA 801	—	—	LA 166 near Doyline	LA 163 in Doyline	1955	1960	
LA 802	3.770	6.067	US 371 south of Cullen	LA 2 northeast of Sarepta	1955	current	
LA 803-1	0.563	0.906	US 371	LA 157 at Main and Reynolds Streets in Springhill	1955	current	
LA 803-2	—	—	LA 803-1 in Springhill	US 371 in Cullen	1955	1960	
LA 803-3	—	—	LA 803-2 (Coyle Avenue) in Cullen	local road east of Cullen	1955	c. 1957	Absorbed into LA 803-2
LA 804	—	—	US 79/US 80 in Minden	US 80 in Minden	1955	c. 1957	
LA 805	0.480	0.772	LA 154/LA 518	LA 9 in Athens	1955	current	
LA 806	2.971	4.781	Robinson Lane	LA 2 east of Homer	1955	current	Along Arizona Road
LA 807	0.234	0.377	LA 2 Alt.	Holly Circle in Haynesville	1955	current	
LA 808	7.589	12.213	LA 615 northeast of Shongaloo	LA 615 in Haynesville	1955	current	
LA 809	—	—	LA 505	Siloam Springs Methodist Church south of Jonesboro	1955	2012	
LA 810	8.320	13.390	LA 505 east of Jonesboro	LA 34 south of Chatham	1955	current	
LA 811	9.544	15.360	LA 4 east of Jonesboro	US 167 north of Hodge	1955	current	
LA 812	—	—	LA 811	Zion Rest Primitive Baptist Church east of Jonesboro	1955	2012	
LA 813-1	—	—	US 167	LA 147 in Jonesboro	1955	2004	Became a portion of US 167
LA 813-2	—	—	Bear Creek west of Jonesboro	US 167	1955	1959	
LA 813-3	2.510	4.039	US 167 in Hodge	LA 542	1955	current	
LA 814	—	—	LA 4	CC Camp Road and May Road	1955	c. 1959	
LA 815	3.738	6.016	LA 147	LA 507 southeast of Simboro	1955	current	
LA 816	—	—	LA 563 near Simboro	Mondy Road and Madden Road	1955	1961	
LA 817-1	—	—	US 80/LA 507 in Jonesboro	Cranford Street	1955	1959	Now part of LA 507
LA 817-2	—	—	Loop off US 80 around Simsboro High School		1955	2008	
LA 817-3	0.096	0.154	LA 507 in Simboro	Tiger Drive	1955	current	
LA 818	8.724	14.040	US 167/LA 148 at Clay	LA 150 in Ruston	1955	current	
LA 820	6.724	10.821	LA 145 in Choudrant	LA 33/LA 822 at Cedarton	1955	current	
LA 821	8.186	13.174	LA 33 north of Ruston	LA 145 in Sibley	1955	current	
LA 822	21.971	35.359	LA 146 northwest of Vienna	LA 145 in Downsville	1955	current	
LA 824-1	0.236	0.380	LA 151 in Dubach	LA 824-2	1955	current	
LA 824-2	7.9	12.7	US 63/US 167 in Dubach	LA 824-1	1955	current	
LA 824-3	0.070	0.113	US 63/US 167 in Dubach	LA 151	1955	current	
LA 825	—	—	LA 15 in Spearsville	Arkansas state line east of Junction City	1955	1967	
LA 826	2.106	3.389	LA 33 in Sadie	Huttig Road in Litroe	1955	current	
LA 827	5.516	8.877	LA 143 in Marion	Dean Church Road and Dean Haile Road	1955	current	
LA 828	7.9	12.7	Farmerville corporate limits	LA 2 east of Farmerville	1955	current	
LA 829	—	—	Missouri Pacific Railroad crossing	LA 142 near Beekman	1955	1961	
LA 830-1	2.821	4.540	US 425 in Bastrop	LA 592	1955	current	
LA 830-2	2.950	4.748	US 425 in Bastrop	AL&M Railroad crossing	1955	current	
LA 830-3	3.581	5.763	US 425 in Bastrop	US 165/US 425/LA 2	1955	current	
LA 830-4	1.720	2.768	US 165/US 425/LA 2 in Bastrop	LA 830-3	1955	current	
LA 830-5	—	—	US 165/LA 2 in Bastrop	LA 139	1955	c. 1957	
LA 830-5	1.436	2.311	LA 593 in Bastrop	US 165/US 425/LA 2	1970	current	
LA 830-6	1.535	2.470	US 165/US 425/LA 2 in Bastrop	US 425	1970	current	
LA 831	—	—	LA 139/LA 554 west of Collinston	LA 138 southwest of Collinston	1955	c. 1957	
LA 832	—	—	US 165	LA 599 south of Bonita	1955	1961	
LA 833	4.910	7.902	LA 140 west of Bonita	US 165 in Jones	1955	current	
LA 834	9.626	15.492	LA 591 west of Jones	US 165 and LA 835 in Jones	1955	current	
LA 835	12.094	19.463	US 165/LA 834 in Jones	LA 585 southwest of Kilbourne	1955	current	
LA 836	—	—	US 165 north of Jones	LA 835 east of Jones	1955	1962	
LA 837	4.587	7.382	LA 151 at Carlton	LA 151 at Pleasant Valley	1955	current	
LA 838	9.170	14.758	LA 546 northeast of Cadeville	LA 617 south of West Monroe	1955	current	
LA 839	—	—	Pine Bluff Road	LA 557 at Luna	1955	c. 1957	
LA 840-1	1.214	1.954	LA 3033	LA 34 south of West Monroe	1955	current	
LA 840-2	—	—	LA 34	Phillips Street in West Monroe	1955	c. 1957	
LA 840-3	—	—	LA 34	US 80/LA 15 in West Monroe	1955	1962	
LA 840-4	—	—	US 165	Vernon Street in Monroe	1955	c. 1957	
LA 840-5	—	—	South 26th Street	US 80 and US 165 at the intersection of Louisville Avenue, Powell Avenue, and Island Road in Monroe	1955	c. 1957	
LA 840-6	3.970	6.389	US 80/US 165 Bus	US 165 in Monroe	1955	current	Was SR 1927 before 1955
LA 841	9.430	15.176	US 165	LA 15 south of Monroe	1955	current	
LA 842	—	—	US 165 south of Kelly	LA 506 in Kelly	1955	1970	
LA 843	5.983	9.629	LA 124 east of Olla	LA 506 in Kelly	1955	current	
LA 844	3.079	4.955	US 165 south of Clarks	US 165 between Clarks and Grayson	1955	current	
LA 845	1.938	3.119	LA 547 in Clarks	LA 126 west of Grayson	1955	current	
LA 846	19.136	30.796	Countrywood Drive	Pine Bluff Road at Caldwell-Ouachita parish line	1955	current	
LA 847	5.462	8.790	US 165 north of Columbia	LA 133 northwest of Hebert	1955	current	
LA 848	4.949	7.965	Carson Road southeast of Hebert	LA 561 in Hebert	1955	current	
LA 849	12.791	20.585	LA 506 east of Kelly	US 165 south of Columbia	1955	current	
LA 850	8.980	14.452	LA 849 south of Grayson	LA 4 north of Grayson	1955	current	
LA 851	2.574	4.142	LA 126	LA 849 southeast of Grayson	1955	current	
LA 852	4.988	8.027	US 80 in Rayville	LA 583 northeast of Rayville	1955	current	
LA 853	—	—	Horn Road	Ashley Avenue in Rayville	1955	c. 1957	
LA 854	9.418	15.157	LA 183 north of Holly Ridge	LA 17 north of Delhi	1955	current	
LA 855	1.782	2.868	McGowen Road and Deerman Road	LA 17 north of Delhi	1955	current	
LA 856	4.055	6.526	US 425/LA 15 north of Mangham	Local road northeast of Mangham	1955	current	
LA 857	4.810	7.741	US 425/LA 15 in Baskin	LA 132 northeast of Baskin	1955	current	
LA 858	4.397	7.076	Ray Walters Road	LA 17 north of Crowville	1955	current	
LA 859	4.192	6.746	LA 858	LA 132 north of Crowville	1955	current	
LA 860	3.086	4.966	Union Church Road and Johnny Ford Road	LA 577 at Warsaw Ferry	1955	current	
LA 861	3.032	4.880	LA 17	Dead end at Bayou Macon northeast of Crowville	1955	current	
LA 862	0.997	1.605	LA 610	Local road east of Swampers	1955	current	
LA 863	2.377	3.825	LA 4	LA 578 east of Winnsboro	1955	current	
LA 864	0.964	1.551	US 425/LA 15	LA 4/LA 17 in Winnsboro	1955	current	
LA 865	7.948	12.791	LA 4 south of Winnsboro	Courthouse Road and Cowart Road	1955	current	Gap in route between US 425/LA 17 and LA 4/LA 17
LA 866	0.980	1.577	LA 3210	Stuckey Lane south of Winnsboro	1955	current	
LA 867	3.502	5.636	US 425/LA 15 south of Baskin	LA 577 east of Baskin	1955	current	
LA 868	2.227	3.584	US 425/LA 15 in Winnsboro	LA 867 southeast of Baskin	1955	current	
LA 869	3.795	6.107	LA 618 northwest of Winnsboro	LA 618 northwest of Winnsboro	1955	current	Loop
LA 870	0.937	1.508	LA 135	Ogden Cemetery Loop west of Winnsboro	1955	current	
LA 871	3.019	4.859	Sanders Road	LA 562 at Fort Necessity	1955	current	
LA 872	—	—	intersection with two local roads	LA 871 southwest of Fort Necessity	1955	1977	
LA 873	1.274	2.050	Homestead Lane and John Dailey Road	LA 562 at Extension	1955	current	
LA 874	3.012	4.847	Jigger Point Road and Slick Williams Road	LA 128 at Jigger	1955	current	
LA 875	9.189	14.788	LA 562 southwest of Wisner	US 425/LA 15 north of Wisner	1955	current	
LA 876	5.118	8.237	LA 875 west of Wisner	LA 128 west of Gilbert	1955	current	
LA 877	14.293	23.002	LA 17 south of Epps	LA 134 southwest of Lake Providence	1955	current	
LA 878	3.350	5.391	LA 2	LA 585/LA 587 west of Oak Grove	1955	current	
LA 879	5.681	9.143	LA 585 at Fiske	LA 2 in Oak Grove	1955	current	
LA 880	2.490	4.007	LA 17 south of Kilbourne	LA 585 east of Kilbourne	1955	current	
LA 881	5.744	9.244	LA 134	LA 581 west of Transylvania	1955	current	
LA 882	7.922	12.749	LA 134 southwest of Lake Providence	LA 134 southwest of Lake Providence	1955	current	Loop
LA 883-1	1.77	2.85	LA 134 in Lake Providence	US 65	1955	current	
LA 883-2	7.922	12.749	LA 883-1	US 65 in Lake Providence	1955	current	
LA 884	—	—	Tensas River	US 65 south of Tallulah	1955	c. 1957	
LA 885	—	—	LA 603 east of Afton	Bayou Vidal	1955	1977	
LA 886	—	—	LA 605 north of Newellton	LA 608 northeast of Newellton	1955	c. 1957	
LA 887	7.922	12.749	LA 134 southwest of Lake Providence	LA 134 southwest of Lake Providence	1955	current	Loop
LA 888	19.831	31.915	LA 4 west of Newellton	LA 605 north of Newellton	1955	current	
LA 889	—	—	—	—	1955	1960	
LA 890	—	—	—	—	1955	c. 1960	
LA 891	—	—	—	—	1955	1960	
LA 892	6.547	10.536	LA 573	LA 568 west of St. Joseph	1955	current	
LA 893	—	—	Tensas River	LA 573 at Cooter Point	1955	c. 1957	
LA 894	—	—	—	—	1955	c. 1957	
LA 895	—	—	—	—	1955	c. 1957	
LA 896	0.781	1.257	US 65	LA 568 north of Waterproof	1955	current	
LA 897-1	1.63	2.62	—	—	1955	current	
LA 897-2	0.35	0.56	LA 897-3/LA 897-6 at Hancock Street in St. Joseph	LA 128	1955	current	
LA 897-3	0.28	0.45	LA 897-2/LA 897-6 at 4th Street in St. Joseph	LA 897-1	1955	current	
LA 897-4	0.13	0.21	LA 897-5 in St. Joseph	LA 897-1	1955	current	
LA 897-5	0.05	0.080	LA 897-4	LA 897-3 in St. Joseph	1955	current	
LA 897-6	1.21	1.95	LA 128 in St. Joseph	LA 897-2/LA 897-3 at 4th Street	1955	current	
LA 898	0.332	0.534	US 65 at Somerset	US 65 at Somerset	1955	current	Loop
LA 899	—	—	LA 566	US 65 north of Clayton	1955	c. 1957	
Former

=== LA 900 to LA 999 ===
Number	Length (mi)	Length (km)	Southern or western terminus	Northern or eastern terminus	Formed	Removed	Notes
LA 900	4.275	6.880	LA 568 northeast of Ferriday	US 65 in Clayton	1955	current	
LA 901	—	—	LA 569 south of Canebrake	local road at L'Argent	1955	1976	
LA 902	—	—	local road	LA 566 west of Clayton	1955	c. 1957	
LA 903	1.478	2.379	Doty Road and Country Store Road	US 425/LA 15 in Ferriday	1955	current	
LA 904	—	—	Dead end	US 84 west of Ferriday	1955	c. 1957	
LA 905	—	—	LA 566	local road north of Elkhorn	1955	c. 1957	
LA 906	2.402	3.866	LA 129/LA 565 in Monterey	Island Road	1955	current	
LA 907	5.158	8.301	LA 129	Herbert Crouch Road west of Monterey	1955	current	
LA 908	3.444	5.543	Levee Road	LA 907 west of Monterey	1955	current	
LA 909	5.350	8.610	LA 129 north of Acme	LA 129 in New Era	1955	current	
LA 910	2.784	4.480	Dora Knapp Road and Black Hawk-Acme Levee Road	LA 15 at Shaw	1955	current	Along Dora Knapp Road
LA 911	—	—	LA 131 at Slocum	LA 131 at Deer Park	1955	1961	
LA 912	—	—	Union Pacific Railroad tracks	LA 18 in St. James	1955	1999	along Post Office Street
LA 913	8.169	13.147	LA 8 in Leland	US 425/LA 15 at Peck	1955	current	
LA 914	1.883	3.030	LA 913 south of Norris Springs	LA 8 west of Sicily Island	1955	current	
LA 915	2.657	4.276	Bend Road	LA 916 northeast of Norris Springs	1955	current	
LA 916	3.539	5.695	LA 8 west of Sicily Island	LA 913 north of Norris Springs	1955	current	
LA 917	—	—	LA 913/LA 916	local road northwest of Sicily Island	1955	1978	
LA 918	—	—	LA 15	local road north of Sicily Island	1955	c. 1957	
LA 919	—	—	Dead end	LA 15 north of Sicily Island	1955	1978	
LA 920	—	—	LA 15 in Foules	Dead end north of Foules	1955	1973	
LA 921	13.034	20.976	Tensas Road southwest of Maitland	Crawford Road north of Foules	1955	current	
LA 922	2.041	3.285	Local road in Harrisonburg	Local road east of Harrisonburg	1955	current	
LA 923	10.318	16.605	Little River Road	LA 124 at Wallace Ridge.	1955	current	
LA 924	—	—	LA 124 south of Wallace Ridge	local road at Quaid	1955	c. 1957	
LA 925	—	—	Loop off LA 124 south of Jonesville		1955	1965	
LA 926	—	—	local road	LA 564 south of Jonesville	1955	1965	
LA 927	1.111	1.788	US 84 (4th Street) in Jonesville	LA 124 in Jonesville	c. 1957	current	Former LA 927-1 and LA 927-13
LA 927-1	—	—	US 84 in Jonesville	Mound Street in Jonesville	1955	c. 1957	along 1st Street; combined with LA 927-13 and renumbered to LA 927
LA 927-2	—	—	Main Street in Jonesville	Front Street in Jonesville	1955	c. 1957	along Little River Road
LA 927-3	—	—	Mound Street in Jonesville	Front Street in Jonesville	1955	c. 1957	along 2nd Street
LA 927-4	—	—	1st Street in Jonesville	Little River Road in Jonesville	1955	c. 1957	along Front Street
LA 927-5	—	—	Division Street in Jonesville	Mound Street in Jonesville	1955	c. 1957	along 3rd Street
LA 927-6	—	—	Willow Street in Jonesville	Front Street in Jonesville	1955	c. 1957	along 9th Street
LA 927-7	—	—	Division Street in Jonesville	Willow Street in Jonesville	1955	c. 1957	along 9th Street
LA 927-8	—	—	Main Street in Jonesville	Mound Street in Jonesville	1955	c. 1957	along 10th Street
LA 927-9	—	—	10th Street in Jonesville	Little River Road in Jonesville	1955	c. 1957	along Main Street
LA 927-10	—	—	4th Street in Jonesville	Little River Road in Jonesville	1955	c. 1957	along Division Street
LA 927-11	—	—	10th Street in Jonesville	Little River Road in Jonesville	1955	c. 1957	along Willow Street
LA 927-12	—	—	4th Street in Jonesville	Little River Road in Jonesville	1955	c. 1957	along Pond Street
LA 927-13	—	—	4th Street in Jonesville	1st Street in Jonesville	1955	c. 1957	along Mound Street; combined with LA 927-1 and renumbered to LA 927
LA 928	5.689	9.156	LA 74 west of Dutchtown	LA 427 northwest of Prairieville	1955	current	Along Bluff Road
LA 929	—	—	US 61 in Prairieville	LA 42 at Hobart	1955	1990	
LA 930	—	—	Ascension Parish Highway 929 and Daigle Road	LA 42 west of Hobart	1955	2019	Transferred to local control
LA 931	5.295	8.521	LA 44 north of Gonzales	LA 431 south of Port Vincent	1955	current	
LA 932	—	—	LA 931	Joe Sevario Road	1955	2000	
LA 933	4.475	7.202	LA 44 north of Gonzales	LA 42 west of Port Vincent	1955	current	
LA 934	5.544	8.922	LA 44 north of Gonzales	Gold Place Road and Gaudin Drive	1955	current	
LA 935	7.574	12.189	LA 44 in Gonzales	LA 22 north of Sorrento	1955	current	
LA 936	3.777	6.078	LA 22 north of Sorrento	LA 22 at Acy	1955	current	
LA 937	1.745	2.808	LA 936 south of Acy	LA 22 east of Acy	1955	current	
LA 938	2.285	3.677	LA 74 north of Gonzales	LA 44 in Gonzales	1955	current	
LA 939	1.214	1.954	LA 44	US 61 in Gonzales	1955	current	
LA 940	0.999	1.608	South Darla Avenue	LA 44 in Gonzales	1955	current	
LA 941	4.317	6.948	LA 44 south of Gonzales	LA 30 east of Gonzales	1955	current	
LA 942	5.101	8.209	LA 22 and LA 75 in Darrow	LA 44 in Burnside	1955	current	
LA 943	7.817	12.580	LA 308 southwest of Donaldsonville	LA 1 west of Donaldsonville	1955	current	
LA 944	—	—	LA 1	LA 943 west of Donaldsonville	1955	2025	Transferred to local control
LA 945	1.463	2.354	LA 308	LA 3089 in Donaldsonville	1955	current	
LA 945-1	—	—	St. Patrick Street railroad overpass in Donaldsonville		1955	1957	Combined with LA 945-2 and LA 945-3 and renumbered to LA 945
LA 945-2	—	—	4th Street in Donaldsonville	local road (now Vatican Drive) in Donaldsonville	1955	1957	along St. Patrick Street; combined with LA 945-1 and LA 945-3 and renumbered to LA 945
LA 945-3	—	—	local road (now Vatican Drive) in Donaldsonville	LA 308 in Donaldsonville	1955	1957	along St. Patrick Street; combined with LA 945-1 and LA 945-2 and renumbered to LA 945
LA 946	5.211	8.386	LA 37 in Baton Rouge	LA 408 in Central	1955	current	
LA 947	—	—	US 190	LA 37 east of Baton Rouge	1955	c. 1957	
LA 948	0.350	0.563	US 61 and LA 42	LA 73 southeast of Baton Rouge	1955	current	
LA 949	—	—	LA 425	LA 427 south of Baton Rouge	1955	1960	
LA 950	—	—	—	—	1955	1960	
LA 951	—	—	Driveways within the East Louisiana Mental Hospital ground and forensic facility off LA 10 in Jackson		1955	2008	
LA 952	10.193	16.404	LA 10 in Jackson	LA 68 in Wilson	1955	current	
LA 953	0.331	0.533	Elliott Lane	LA 10 in McManus	1955	current	
LA 954	0.992	1.596	US 61	LA 964 northwest of Zachary	1955	current	
LA 955	17.110	27.536	LA 412 west of Slaughter	LA 10 west of Clinton	1955	current	
LA 956	3.965	6.381	LA 412 east of Slaughter	LA 19 in Ethel	1955	current	
LA 957	2.720	4.377	LA 412	LA 955 northeast of Slaughter	1955	current	
LA 958	3.736	6.013	East Baton Rouge Parish line	LA 959 east of Slaughter	1955	current	
LA 959	9.991	16.079	LA 67 northeast of Olive Branch	LA 63 northwest of Bluff Creek	1955	current	
LA 960	5.011	8.064	LA 63 at Bluff Creek	North of Three Knotch Road	1955	current	
LA 961	2.519	4.054	LA 10	East of Sandy Creek bridge northeast of Clinton	1955	current	
LA 962	—	—	—	—	1955	1963	
LA 963	5.402	8.694	LA 68 northeast of Jackson	LA 10 west of Clinton	1955	current	
LA 964	19.100	30.738	US 61 north of Baton Rouge	Hood Container of Louisiana entrance gate	1955	current	
LA 965	9.669	15.561	Powell Station Road	LA 10 west of Jackson	1955	current	
LA 966	6.720	10.815	US 61	LA 965 east of St. Francisville	1955	current	
LA 967	5.311	8.547	LA 421 northeast of Spillman	Mississippi state line north of Cornor	1955	current	
LA 968	0.617	0.993	Highland Road	LA 66 south of Weyanoke.	1955	current	
LA 969	1.307	2.103	LA 66	Mississippi state line northwest of Weyanoke	1955	current	
LA 970	9.447	15.203	LA 417 at Jacoby	LA 418 northwest of Torras	1955	current	
LA 971	3.874	6.235	LA 1 at Lettsworth	LA 418 at Williamsport	1955	current	
LA 972	2.266	3.647	LA 1 near Lacour	LA 419 at Lacour	1955	current	
LA 973	1.120	1.802	Ben Sterling Road	LA 417 south of Quinton	1955	current	
LA 974	0.8	1.3	—	—	1955	c. 1959	
LA 975	17.897	28.802	South of I-10 in Iberville Parish	US 190 near Krotz Springs	1955	current	
LA 976	0.617	0.993	LA 81	US 190 west of Livonia	1955	current	
LA 977	4.663	7.504	LA 411 east of Maringouin	LA 77 south of Livonia	1955	current	
LA 978	4.674	7.522	US 190 east of Livonia	LA 1 in Oscar	1955	current	
LA 979	2.527	4.067	LA 78 north of Livonia	LA 978 east of Livonia	1955	current	
LA 980	—	—	LA 1	LA 10 in New Roads	1955	1972	
LA 981	8.191	13.182	LA 415 east of New Roads	LA 420 north of New Roads	1955	current	
LA 982	2.590	4.168	LA 415 in Arbroth	LA 416 in Glynn	1955	current	
LA 983	9.304	14.973	US 190/LA 1 southeast of Erwinville	LA 414 at Chenal	1955	current	
LA 984	6.437	10.359	LA 620 northeast of Erwinville	LA 415 south of Arbroth	1955	current	
LA 985	1.223	1.968	LA 983 southeast of Bueche	LA 415 at Alfords	1955	current	
LA 986	9.346	15.041	LA 76 and LA 415 west of Port Allen	LA 415 north of Lobdell Station	1955	current	
LA 987-1	0.21	0.34	LA 1	LA 986 in Port Allen	1955	2012	
LA 987-2	—	—	LA 1	LA 986 in Port Allen	1955	2015	
LA 987-3	2.94	4.73	LA 415	LA 986 in Port Allen	1955	current	
LA 987-4	0.50	0.80	LA 1 in Port Allen	LA 987-5	1955	current	
LA 987-5	—	—	LA 987-6	LA 987-4 in Port Allen	1955	1972	
LA 987-6	—	—	LA 987-5	LA 987-4 in Port Allen	1955	1972	
LA 988	10.977	17.666	LA 1 in Plaquemine	LA 1 south of Port Allen	1955	current	
LA 989-1	5.430	8.739	Dead end at the Gulf Intracoastal Waterway	LA 988	1955	current	
LA 989-2	2.000	3.219	LA 989-1	LA 988	1955	current	
LA 990	0.562	0.904	LA 1	LA 988 in Addis	1955	current	Was SR 133 before 1955; section west of LA 1 transferred to local control by 2024
LA 991	5.904	9.502	LA 75 east of Plaquemine	LA 327 in St. Gabriel	1955	current	
LA 992	2.722	4.381	LA 1 in Plaquemine	LA 75	1955	current	
LA 993	7.104	11.433	Lone Star Road	LA 69/LA 405 west of White Castle	1955	current	
LA 994	1.171	1.885	Intersection of Ourso Road and Ridge Road	LA 993 southwest of White Castle	1955	current	
LA 995	2.833	4.559	LA 69	Private road south of White Castle	1955	current	
LA 996	6.013	9.677	LA 70 east of Grand Bayou	LA 69 north of the Iberville Parish line	1955	current	
LA 997	13.048	20.999	LA 70 west of Belle River	LA 75 in Bayou Pigeon	1955	current	
LA 998	0.865	1.392	Union Pacific rail line	LA 308 north of Paincourtville	1955	current	
LA 999	1.290	2.076	Lula Sugar Factory	LA 1 north of Paincourtville	1955	current	
Former

=== LA 1000 to LA 1099 ===
Number	Length (mi)	Length (km)	Southern or western terminus	Northern or eastern terminus	Formed	Removed	Notes
LA 1000	2.921	4.701	LA 996 south of Bruly St. Martin	LA 1 north of Paincourtville	1955	current	
LA 1001	0.880	1.416	LA 1000 southeast of Bruly St. Martin	LA 996 at Bruly St. Martin	1955	current	Along Douglas Road
LA 1002	—	—	LA 1000	LA 1 north of Paincourtville	1955	1993	
LA 1003	2.145	3.452	LA 70 north of Paincourtville	LA 1 in Klotzville	1955	current	
LA 1004	2.958	4.760	LA 403 north of Brusle St. Vincent	LA 70 northwest of Paincourtville	1955	current	
LA 1005	1.579	2.541	LA 1004 at Westfield	LA 1 in Paincourtville	1955	current	
LA 1006	3.556	5.723	LA 401 southwest of Napoleonville	LA 402 east of Brusle St. Vincent	1955	current	
LA 1007	0.908	1.461	LA 1006 at Glenwood	LA 1 north of Napoleonville	1955	current	
LA 1008	1.157	1.862	LA 1006 east of Elm Hall	LA 308 east of Napoleonville	1955	current	
LA 1009	—	—	Wildwood Road and Hardtime Road in Cancienne	LA 1 south of Napoleonville	1955	1991	
LA 1010	9.485	15.265	LA 398 south of Labadieville	LA 308 southeast of Napoleonville	1955	current	
LA 1011	6.341	10.205	LA 400 northeast of Attakapas Landing	LA 308 east of Supreme	1955	current	
LA 1012	1.841	2.963	Dead end south of Himalaya Canal	LA 1011 west of Supreme	1955	current	
LA 1013	0.566	0.911	LA 398 at Brule Labadieville	Dead end east of LA 398	1955	current	
LA 1014	4.996	8.040	LA 308	North of Labadieville	1955	current	
LA 1015-1	0.66	1.06	LA 70	near Pierre Bay	1955	current	
LA 1015-2	0.76	1.22	LA 70	near Pierre Bay	1955	current	
LA 1016-1	2.88	4.63	LA 70	Lake Verret	1955	current	
LA 1016-2	3.61	5.81	near Michel Road	point just past LA 70	1955	current	
LA 1017	1.394	2.243	West of Lake Louis	LA 8 in Sicily Island	1955	current	
LA 1018-1	0.10	0.16	LA 124	Catahoula Street	1955	current	
LA 1018-2	0.07	0.11	LA 8	LA 1018-1	1955	current	
LA 1019	12.797	20.595	LA 64 north of Denham Springs	LA 63 east of Oldfield	1955	current	
LA 1020	1.997	3.214	LA 1019 west of Watson	Dead end near Amite River	1955	current	Along Bend Road
LA 1021	—	—	—	—	1955	c. 1957	
LA 1022	1.821	2.931	LA 1019	LA 16 northeast of Watson	1955	current	
LA 1023	4.007	6.449	LA 1019 west of Friendship	LA 63 east of Weiss	1955	current	Along Reinninger Road
LA 1024	13.975	22.491	LA 1019 southwest of Watson	US 190 in Walker	1955	current	
LA 1025	6.266	10.084	LA 16 north of Denham Springs	LA 447 north of Walker	1955	current	Along Arnold Road
LA 1026	10.079	16.221	LA 16 southeast of Denham Springs	LA 16 and LA 64 north of Denham Springs	1955	current	
LA 1027	0.310	0.499	US 190/LA 1026 west of Walker	Walker city limit	1955	current	Section inside Walker removed in 2017 and transferred to local control
LA 1028	1.813	2.918	LA 16	LA 64 north of Denham Springs	1955	current	Along Old River Road
LA 1029	1.586	2.552	US 190 in Walker	LA 447 north of Walker	1955	current	
LA 1030	0.428	0.689	Denham Springs city limit	LA 1026 northeast of Denham Springs	1955	current	Along Cockerham Road
LA 1031	1.174	1.889	US 190/LA 16	Cockerham Road in Denham Springs	1955	current	
LA 1032	10.296	16.570	LA 16 northwest of Port Vincent	US 190 in Denham Springs	1955	current	
LA 1033	1.408	2.266	LA 1032	LA 16 northwest of Port Vincent	1955	current	
LA 1034	1.540	2.478	LA 1032	LA 16 south of Denham Springs	1955	current	
LA 1035-1	0.27	0.43	South of Iowa Street in Livingston	US 190/LA 63	1955	current	
LA 1035-2	0.28	0.45	South of Iowa Street in Livingston	US 190/LA 63	1955	current	
LA 1035-3	—	—	LA 1035-2 in Livingston	LA 1035-1	1955	2022	Transferred to local control
LA 1035-4	—	—	LA 1035-1	US 190 in Livingston	1955	2022	Transferred to local control
LA 1036	16.744	26.947	LA 441 in Holden	LA 441 in Montpelier	1955	current	
LA 1037	8.764	14.104	North of Tickfaw State Park	Natalbany River in Springfield	1955	current	
LA 1038	0.909	1.463	Carter Cemetery Road and Coates Road	LA 22/LA 1037 in Springfield	1955	current	Along Carter Cemetery Road
LA 1039	3.417	5.499	Black Lake Club Road	LA 22 east of Maurepas	1955	current	
LA 1040	6.001	9.658	LA 43 south of Albany	US 51 in Hammond	1955	current	Was SR 7-D (former SR 7 and US 190) before 1955
LA 1041	5.349	8.608	LA 16 and LA 449 in Pine Grove	LA 1036 west of Montpelier	1955	current	
LA 1042	5.544	8.922	Parish Road 1042 west of Greensburg	LA 37 in Greensburg	1955	current	
LA 1043	7.460	12.006	LA 10 east of Darlington	LA 43 at Liverpool	1955	current	
LA 1044	5.705	9.181	LA 432 in Chipola	Mississippi state line north of Chipola	1955	current	
LA 1045	7.310	11.764	LA 43 south of Greensburg	LA 16 west of Amite City	1955	current	
LA 1046	5.458	8.784	LA 441 north of Hillsdale	LA 1045 west of Amite City	1955	current	
LA 1047	5.015	8.071	LA 441 southeast of Greensburg	LA 1046 at Kedron	1955	current	
LA 1048	4.982	8.018	LA 1047 southeast of Greensburg	US 51/LA 10 north of Roseland	1955	current	
LA 1049	5.520	8.884	LA 440 west of Tangipahoa	LA 38 in Kentwood	1955	current	
LA 1050	4.966	7.992	LA 440 in Tangipahoa	LA 38 west of Kentwood	1955	current	Was SR 1056 and SR 33-D (former SR 33 and US 51) before 1955
LA 1051	3.180	5.118	LA 1050 north of Tangipahoa	LA 1049 in Kentwood	1955	current	Was a portion of SR 33-D (former SR 33 and US 51) before 1955
LA 1052	—	—	US 51	Camp Moore Condederate Museum and Cemetery north of Tangipahoa	1955	2000	Was Route C-2219 (formerly SR 406) before 1955; returned to local control
LA 1053	5.555	8.940	US 51 in Kentwood	Mississippi state line west of Osyka, MS	1955	current	Was SR 1057 before 1955
LA 1054	33.267	53.538	LA 40 east of Independence	US 51 at Greenlaw	1955	current	
LA 1055	15.661	25.204	LA 1054 east of Greenlaw	LA 438 east of Mt. Hermon	1955	current	
LA 1056	13.553	21.811	LA 38 east of Spring Creek	LA 440 at Richardson	1955	current	
LA 1057	10.226	16.457	LA 440 and LA 1054 east of Tangipahoa	LA 440 east of Bailey	1955	current	
LA 1058	5.425	8.731	LA 10 northeast of Roseland	LA 440 north of Chesbrough	1955	current	
LA 1059	—	—	Bond Road and South River Road	LA 1058 south of Chesbrough	1955	2024	Transferred to local control
LA 1060	—	—	US 51 at Arcola	Natalbany Creek northwest of Arcola	1955	c. 1957	
LA 1061	17.569	28.275	LA 1054 east of Roseland	LA 38 and LA 1054 north of Spring Creek	1955	current	
LA 1062	6.034	9.711	LA 40 in Loranger	LA 445 south of Husser	1955	current	
LA 1063	6.612	10.641	LA 442 west of Tickfaw	US 51 and LA 1065 in Independence	1955	current	
LA 1064	9.271	14.920	LA 43 north of Albany	LA 443 north of Hammond	1955	current	Was SR 1079 before 1955
LA 1065	10.990	17.687	US 190 in Hammond	US 51 and LA 1063 in Independence	1955	current	
LA 1066	—	—	US 51/US 190 and LA 36	US 51 in Hammond	1955	c. 1957	
LA 1067	—	—	LA 3158	US 190 east of Hammond	1955	2000	Originally continued to US 51 Bus., but was shortened to LA 3158 in the 1970s when it was designated; remainder returned to local control
LA 1068	—	—	LA 73 Baton Rouge	LA 426 Baton Rouge	1955	2018	Transferred to local control; now Drusilla Lane
LA 1069	0.630	1.014	LA 436	LA 430 in Franklinton	1955	current	
LA 1070	2.851	4.588	LA 424	LA 438 north of Pine	1955	current	
LA 1071	5.060	8.143	LA 21 in Angie	Jones Creek Road and LA 1071 northeast of Varnado	1955	current	
LA 1072	12.913	20.781	LA 16 south of Franklinton	LA 60 in Plainview	1955	current	
LA 1073	1.652	2.659	LA 16	LA 60 east of Enon	1955	current	
LA 1074	5.845	9.407	LA 16 west of Sun	LA 1075 in Rio	1955	current	
LA 1075	6.145	9.889	LA 21 north of Sun	Bogalusa city limit	1955	current	
LA 1076	—	—	LA 21	LA 10 in Bogalusa	1955	c. 1957	
LA 1077	20.612	33.172	Lake Pontchartrain in Madisonville	LA 25 south of Folsom	1955	current	Was SR 188, Route C-1723 and Route C-1724 before 1955
LA 1078	5.142	8.275	LA 1077	LA 25 south of Folsom	1955	current	
LA 1079	1.397	2.248	near Madison Parish line	LA 888 at Westwood	1955	current	
LA 1080	—	—	Bogue Falaya River	Graci Road	1955	2007	
LA 1081	5.722	9.209	LA 437 north of Covington	LA 437 north of Covington	1955	current	Loop
LA 1082	8.321	13.391	LA 21 northeast of Covington	LA 40 west of Bush	1955	current	Along Old Military Road
LA 1083	8.300	13.358	Allen Road and Lowe Davis Road	LA 40 west of Bush	1955	current	
LA 1084	1.494	2.404	LA 21 northeast of Covington	LA 1083 south of Waldheim	1955	current	
LA 1085	4.409	7.096	LA 22 west of Madisonville	LA 1077 north of Madisonville	1955	current	
LA 1086	—	—	Loop off LA 21 in Covington		1955	c. 1957	
LA 1087	—	—	North Causeway Boulevard	US 190 and LA 59 in Mandeville	1955	2007	
LA 1088	9.750	15.691	LA 59 north of Mandeville	LA 36 west of Hickory	1955	current	
LA 1089	—	—	Lake Pontchartrain	US 190 near Fontainebleau State Park	1955	2008	Was never signed
LA 1090	4.520	7.274	US 190 east of Slidell	I-59 and US 11 south of Pearl River	1955	current	
LA 1091	5.151	8.290	US 190 in Slidell	US 11 south of Pearl River	1955	current	
LA 1092	—	—	US 11/US 190 in Slidell	LA 1090	1955	1971	Became a portion of US 190
LA 1093-1	0.83	1.34	US 190 and LA 434 in Lacombe	Jackson Street	1955	current	
LA 1093-2	—	—	US 190 in Lacombe	LA 1093-1	1955	1987	
LA 1093-3	0.5	0.80	US 190 in Lacombe	LA 1093-1	1955	current	
LA 1094	—	—	LA 573 at Mayflower	Crooked Bayou Road and Doc Case Road	1955	c. 1957	
LA 1095	—	—	LA 722 east of Rayne	LA 98 northeast of Rayne	1955	1962	Became a portion of LA 98
LA 1096	3.629	5.840	LA 95 near Duson	LA 95 north of Duson	1955	current	Loop off LA 95
LA 1097	2.232	3.592	LA 98 at Arceneaux	LA 95 south of Mire	1955	current	
LA 1098	2.742	4.413	LA 95 north of Mire	LA 365 east of Higginbotham	1955	current	
LA 1099	0.775	1.247	LA 1098	LA 365 southeast of Higginbotham	1955	current	
Former

=== LA 1100 to LA 1199 ===
Number	Length (mi)	Length (km)	Southern or western terminus	Northern or eastern terminus	Formed	Removed	Notes
LA 1100	2.124	3.418	LA 98 east of Castille	LA 95 south of Higginhotham	1955	current	Along Higginbotham Highway
LA 1101	4.299	6.919	LA 98 in Castille	LA 365 east of Branch	1955	current	
LA 1102	1.120	1.802	LA 35 south of Branch	LA 1101 southeast of Branch	1955	current	Along J. E. Pelton Road
LA 1103	—	—	LA 365 west of Higginbotham	LA 95 north of Higginbotham	1955	1961	Transferred to local control
LA 1104	1.085	1.746	LA 178 in Church Point	LA 754 east of Church Point	1955	current	
LA 1105	5.686	9.151	LA 367 southwest of Richard	LA 95 northwest of Church Point	1955	current	
LA 1106	2.004	3.225	Gumpoint Road	LA 367 southwest of Richard	1955	current	Along Henry Bieber Road
LA 1107	1.054	1.696	LA 367 west of Richard	LA 370/LA 1105 at Richard	1955	current	Along Richard School Road
LA 1108	2.634	4.239	LA 95 northwest of Church Point	LA 358 at Pitreville	1955	current	
LA 1109	3.012	4.847	LA 98 east of Maxie	LA 365 northeast of Maxie	1955	current	
LA 1110	2.906	4.677	LA 98 east of Maxie	LA 367 at Link	1955	current	Along Providence Highway
LA 1111	6.009	9.671	LA 13/LA 13 Truck in Crowley	LA 98 west of Roberts Cove	1955	current	
LA 1112	—	—	Loop off LA 1111 north of Crowley		1955	2018	Transferred to local control
LA 1113	1.283	2.065	LA 98 at Roberts Cove	LA 367 northeast of Roberts Cove	1955	current	
LA 1114	—	—	local road	LA 13 south of Lyons Point	1955	c. 1957	Transferred to local control
LA 1115	8.830	14.211	LA 91 south of Morse	LA 13 east of Lyons Point	1955	current	Along Lyons Point Highway
LA 1116	—	—	local road southwest of Crowley	US 90 west of Crowley	1955	c. 1957	Transferred to local control
LA 1117	—	—	LA 92 east of Mermentau	US 90 in Estherwood	1955	1963	Along Old Spanish Trail; transferred to local control
LA 1118	—	—	local road	LA 1117 (Old Spanish Trail) west of Midland	1955	1963	Transferred to local control
LA 1119	1.006	1.619	Legros Road	LA 92 south of Mermentau	1955	current	Was Route C-1566 before 1955
LA 1120	6.208	9.991	LA 91/LA 100 east of Egan	LA 98 east of Iota	1955	current	
LA 1121	1.517	2.441	LA 100 at Lawson	LA 13 north of Crowley	1955	current	Was SR 26-D before 1955
LA 1122	—	—	LA 91 south of Iota	LA 13 at Ellis	1955	1961	Transferred to local control
LA 1123	5.582	8.983	LA 97/LA 98 west of Iota	LA 97 northwest of Iota	1955	current	
LA 1124	3.863	6.217	LA 92 east of Morse	US 90 in Estherwood	1955	current	
LA 1125	—	—	local road	LA 99 south of Welsh	1955	1963	Transferred to local control
LA 1126	12.202	19.637	LA 99 south of Welsh	US 90 southeast of Jennings	1955	current	
LA 1127	—	—	local road southeast of Roanoke	LA 395 north of Roanoke	1955	1963	Transferred to local control
LA 1128	—	—	LA 102 east of Hathaway	local road at Panchoville	1955	1973	Transferred to local control
LA 1129	5.368	8.639	LA 40	Louisiana Tung Road north of Covington	1955	current	
LA 1130	1.491	2.400	US 190 in Elton	LA 26 east of Elton	1955	current	
LA 1131	3.081	4.958	Simons Road and Ardoin Cove Road	US 90 west of Welsh	1955	current	
LA 1132	—	—	LA 26	local road south of Jennings	1955	1961	Transferred to local control
LA 1133	4.278	6.885	LA 27/LA 108	LA 108 in Carlyss	1955	current	
LA 1134	—	—	LA 108 south of Hollywood	US 90 in Maplewood	1955	1962	Transferred to local control
LA 1135	—	—	Loop off LA 384 south of Lake Charles		1955	1962	Transferred to local control
LA 1136	—	—	LA 385 at Prairieland	LA 397 southwest of Holmwood	1955	1963	Transferred to local control
LA 1137	—	—	LA 473 north of Toro	local road at Rattan	1955	c. 1957	Transferred to local control; southern portion later became part of LA 191
LA 1138-1	0.416	0.669	LA 1138-2	L'Auberge Casino Resort in Lake Charles	2009	current	exit 4 on I-210 with LA 1138-2
LA 1138-1	—	—	I-10/US 90 frontage road south of Westlake	LA 379 in Westlake	1955	1964	Transferred to local control; designation reused in 2009
LA 1138-2	3.847	6.191	LA 384 in Lake Charles	LA 385	1955	current	exit 4 on I-210 with LA 1138-1
LA 1138-3	0.612	0.985	LA 14 in Lake Charles	I-210	1955	current	exit 10 on I-210
LA 1138-4	—	—	North Prater Street	US 171 in Lake Charles	1955	1975	Transferred to local control
LA 1138-5	—	—	North Prater Street	US 171 in Lake Charles	1955	1975	Transferred to local control
LA 1139	—	—	LA 27 west of Iowa	local road northwest of Iowa	1955	c. 1957	Transferred to local control
LA 1140	—	—	LA 82	local road in Johnsons Bayou	1955	c. 1957	Transferred to local control
LA 1141	1.521	2.448	Dead end at Calcasieu Ship Channel	LA 27/LA 82 in Cameron	1955	current	Gap in route across Calcasieu Pass
LA 1142	0.843	1.357	Gayle Street and Broussard Beach Road	LA 27/LA 82 in Cameron	1955	current	Along Beach Road
LA 1143	7.156	11.516	LA 27/LA 82 at Creole	East Creole Road, Chenier Perdue Road, and Muria Road	1955	current	
LA 1144	6.855	11.032	LA 384	Dead end at Number Three Canal southeast of Grand Lake	1955	current	Along Big Pasture Road
LA 1145	1.412	2.272	LA 76 west of Port Allen	US 190/LA 1 at Westover	1955	current	Was Route C-1409 before 1955
LA 1146	7.826	12.595	LA 112 east of DeRidder	US 171 in Rosepine	1955	current	
LA 1147	9.269	14.917	LA 113 at Bundick	LA 26 east of DeRidder	1955	current	
LA 1148	4.064	6.540	Point southwest of Addis	LA 988 north of Plaquemine	1955	current	
LA 1149	—	—	Jefferson Davis–Allen parish line	US 165 in Kinder	1955	1963	Became a portion of LA 383
LA 1150	0.222	0.357	10th Street	US 165 in Kinder	1955	current	
LA 1151	4.703	7.569	Cole Road and Nursery Road	LA 26 in Oberlin	1955	current	
LA 1152	1.458	2.346	Loop off US 165 in Oakdale		1955	current	
LA 1153	5.454	8.777	US 165 in Oakdale	US 165 at Pawnee	1955	current	
LA 1154	—	—	LA 1153	Allen–Rapides parish line	1955	1969	Transferred to local control
LA 1155	—	—	Flat Creek bridge	LA 26 west of Mittie	1955	1977	Transferred to local control
LA 1156	3.217	5.177	LA 112 in Elizabeth	Bay City Road	1955	current	
LA 1157-1	2.026	3.261	Wilburton Lane west of Basile	LA 3277 at Fusilier Avenue	1955	current	
LA 1157-2	0.307	0.494	US 190 on the Evangeline–Acadia parish line	LA 1157-1 near Basile	1955	current	
LA 1158	1.446	2.327	LA 3277	Hunter Road and Christ Road north of Basile	1955	current	
LA 1159	1.511	2.432	LA 1158	Aguillard Road beyond Ruby Road north of Basile	1955	current	Along Aguillard Road
LA 1160	2.800	4.506	Bieber Road and Mike Lane	LA 104/LA 3149 in Mamou	1955	current	
LA 1161	7.096	11.420	LA 104 east of Mamou	LA 29 south of Ville Platte	1955	current	Along Pine Point Road
LA 1162	1.602	2.578	Keith Duplechian Road	LA 29 southwest of Chataignier	1955	current	
LA 1163	5.185	8.344	LA 29/LA 95 in Chataignier	LA 104 in Point Blue	1955	current	
LA 1164	1.035	1.666	LA 1163	LA 29 north of Chataignier	1955	current	
LA 1165	3.800	6.116	LA 29	LA 104 northeast of Chataignier	1955	current	
LA 1166	1.684	2.710	LA 1165	LA 104 northeast of Chataignier	1955	current	
LA 1167	1.079	1.736	LA 104	L'Anse De Cavailer Road near Batier Road northeast of Chataignier	1955	current	
LA 1168	5.931	9.545	US 167/LA 10 in Ville Platte	Bayou Grand Louis bridge at the Evangeline–St. Landry parish line southeast of Ville Platte	1955	current	Along Belaire Cove Road
LA 1169	1.155	1.859	LA 748	LA 363 east of Ville Platte	1955	current	
LA 1170	—	—	LA 363	LA 29 northeast of Ville Platte	1955	1988	Became a portion of LA 29
LA 1171	4.364	7.023	LA 29 in Ville Platte	Cazan Lake Road north of Tate Cove	1955	current	
LA 1172	4.792	7.712	LA 376 north of Vidrine	LA 13 south of Pine Prairie	1955	current	
LA 1173	—	—	Lake Chicot	LA 106 west of St. Landry	1955	2002	Transferred to local control
LA 1174	0.192	0.309	LA 29/LA 95/LA 29 in Chataignier	LA 29/LA 95 in Chataignier	1955	current	
LA 1175	0.854	1.374	LA 29 west of Gold Dust	Walton Lane in Gold Dust	1955	current	
LA 1176	8.163	13.137	LA 115 west of Bunkie	US 71 southeast of Bunkie	1955	current	
LA 1177	2.942	4.735	US 71 northwest of Bunkie	US 71 in Bunkie	1955	current	
LA 1178	7.472	12.025	US 71 northwest of Morrow	LA 29 in Evergreen	1955	current	
LA 1179	6.546	10.535	LA 107 southwest of Plaucheville	LA 107 southeast of Plaucheville	1955	current	
LA 1180	4.060	6.534	Spring Bayou Road	LA 107 south of Plaucheville	1955	current	
LA 1181	5.571	8.966	LA 107 in Plaucheville	eastern side of Bayou Des Glaises Diversion Channel bridge	1955	current	
LA 1182	2.434	3.917	Loop off LA 1181 northeast of Plaucheville		1955	current	
LA 1183	6.535	10.517	LA 105 in Odenburg	LA 1 west of Simmesport	1955	current	
LA 1184	3.284	5.285	Loop off LA 29 west of Cottonport		1955	current	
LA 1185	3.595	5.786	LA 107 north of Cottonport	LA 114 southeast of Mansura	1955	current	
LA 1186	1.318	2.121	LA 114 in Mansura	LA 1 east of Mansura	1955	current	
LA 1187	4.971	8.000	Loop off LA 114 west of Mansura		1955	current	
LA 1188	2.613	4.205	LA 115 southwest of Hessmer	LA 114 west of Hessmer	1955	current	
LA 1189	0.635	1.022	LA 115	LA 452 in Marksville	1955	current	Along Acton Road
LA 1190	1.576	2.536	LA 107/LA 115 in Marksville	Little River Road east of Marksville	1955	current	Along Spring Bayou Road
LA 1191	1.739	2.799	LA 1	LA 107/LA 115 north of Marksville	1955	current	
LA 1192	7.912	12.733	LA 1 northwest of Marksville	LA 107/LA 115 in Marksville	1955	current	
LA 1193	2.340	3.766	LA 453	LA 107/LA 115 northwest of Marksville	1955	current	
LA 1194	3.421	5.506	LA 1 in Fifth Ward	Island Road and Little California Road	1955	current	
LA 1195	1.503	2.419	LA 1 in Fifth Ward	H. Dauzat Road and River Road	1955	current	
LA 1196	8.355	13.446	LA 107/LA 115 in Effie	Vick Road in Dunlap	1955	current	
LA 1197	—	—	LA 107/LA 115 in Effie	local road north of Effie	1955	c. 1957	Transferred to local control
LA 1198	1.076	1.732	LA 1 at Richland	LA 457 north of Richland	1955	current	Along Hathorne Road
LA 1199	6.827	10.987	LA 112 in Elmer	LA 121 in Otis	1955	current	
Former

=== LA 1200 to LA 1299 ===
Number	Length (mi)	Length (km)	Southern or western terminus	Northern or eastern terminus	Formed	Removed	Notes																														
LA 1200	9.998	16.090	Parker Road and Miller Road	LA 1 in Boyce	1955	current																															
LA 1201	0.144	0.232	Johnson Street	LA 121 in Hot Wells	1955	current	Along Alexander Street																														
LA 1202	—	—	LA 496 east of McNutt	LA 496 at Weil	1955	1998	Transferred to local control																														
LA 1203	4.722	7.599	Rigolette Road	US 167 frontage road north of Pineville	1955	current																															
LA 1204	4.004	6.444	LA 3225 in Tioga	LA 623 in Ball	1955	current																															
LA 1205	3.775	6.075	LA 28 at Libuse	Philadelphia Road beyond Libuse Czech Cemetery	1955	current	Along Philadelphia Road																														
LA 1206	7.425	11.949	Loop off LA 115 in Deville		1955	current																															
LA 1207	6.858	11.037	LA 28 in Holloway	LA 1206 east of Deville	1955	current																															
LA 1208-1	1.804	2.903	I-49 frontage road in Alexandria	LA 1	1955	current																															
LA 1208-2	0.443	0.713	Horseshoe Drive in Alexandria	US 71	1955	current																															
LA 1208-3	3.570	5.745	LA 488	US 165 Bus./LA 1/LA 28 Bus. at Bolton Avenue in Alexandria	1955	current																															
LA 1208-4	1.688	2.717	Old Baton Rouge Highway	Hudson Boulevard in Alexandria	2010	current																															
LA 1208-4	—	—	LA 1	US 71/US 165 in Alexandria	1955	2006	Transferred to local control; designation reused in 2010																														
LA 1208-5	0.212	0.341	US 71 and US 165 at Masonic Circle	Masonic Drive in Alexandria	2010	current																															
LA 1208-5	—	—	Pineville western city limits	US 165/LA 28 in Pineville	1955	c. 1957	Transferred to local control; designation reused in 2010																														
LA 1208-6	—	—	US 165 Byp (now US 165)	US 165 (now US 165 Bus.)	1955	c. 1957	Transferred to local control																														
LA 1209	—	—	Baker Avenue	LA 19 in Zachary	1955	2021	Transferred to local control																														
LA 1210	—	—	LA 13 in Crowley	End state maintenance	1955	c. 1957	Transferred to local control																														
LA 1211	4.837	7.784	Savage Forks Road	US 171 in New Llano	1955	current																															
LA 1212	—	—	US 171	LA 8 in Leesville	1955	2006	Transferred to local control																														
LA 1213	0.460	0.740	US 171	LA 8/LA 28/LA 117 in Leesville	1955	current	Along Kurthwood Road																														
LA 1214	—	—	LA 8 in Slagle	LA 28 east of Slagle	1955	1975	Became a portion of LA 121																														
LA 1215	4.035	6.494	Dead end at Toledo Bend Reservoir	LA 191 south of Zwolle	1955	current																															
LA 1216	9.024	14.523	US 171 in Zwolle	LA 175 north of Many	1955	current																															
LA 1217	5.294	8.520	LA 6 in Many	Marthaville Road and Patton Road	1955	current																															
LA 1218	2.809	4.521	LA 191 west of Noble	US 171 in Noble	1955	current																															
LA 1219	—	—	—	—	1955	1981	Became a portion of LA 191																														
LA 1220	2.902	4.670	LA 119 in Bermuda	eastern end of Little River bridge	1955	current																															
LA 1221	3.883	6.249	LA 120 in Bethany	Bethany Highway Extension and Leo Jennings Road	1955	current																															
LA 1222	2.208	3.553	LA 485	Posey Road northeast of Robeline	1955	current																															
LA 1223	1.143	1.839	LA 1 Bus.	LA 6 Bus. in Natchitoches	1955	current																															
LA 1224	2.033	3.272	LA 1 Bus.	Blanchard Road in Natchitoches	1955	current																															
LA 1225	4.231	6.809	US 71 at Luella	LA 6 in Clarence	1955	current																															
LA 1226	9.328	15.012	LA 1225 south of Clarence	Goldonna Road, Trichel Camp Road, and Mammy Trail	1955	current																															
LA 1227	0.611	0.983	LA 1226	Dead end at Saline Bayou northeast of Clarence	1955	current																															
LA 1228	10.289	16.559	Buddy Taylor Road	US 84 west of Winnfield	1955	current																															
LA 1229	2.058	3.312	LA 34	Parish Road 775 north of Atlanta	1955	current																															
LA 1230	7.581	12.200	LA 472 north of Zion	LA 500 in Georgetown	1955	current	Was SR 619 before 1955																														
LA 1232	7.313	11.769	LA 501 north of Calvin	LA 156 north of Winnfield	1955	current																															
LA 1233	9.603	15.455	LA 156 east of Goldonna	LA 126 at Pine Ridge	1955	current																															
LA 1234	3.540	5.697	LA 505 in Gansville	LA 126 west of Dodson	1955	current																															
LA 1235	3.415	5.496	LA 126 in Dodson	Transport Road and Braxton Road	1955	current																															
LA 1236	4.769	7.675	US 167 south of Dodson	LA 34 southeast of Dodson	1955	current																															
LA 1237	1.188	1.912	Jake Creel Road	LA 126 and LA 499 in Sikes	1955	current																															
LA 1238	2.694	4.336	Beech Creek Church Road and Weatherford Road	LA 127 southeast of Hickory Valley	1955	current																															
LA 1239-1	1.046	1.683	Creola Street in Montgomery	US 71 and LA 122 in Montgomery	1955	current	Was portions of SR 1105 and SR 1 (later SR 1-D) before 1955																														
LA 1239-2	0.299	0.481	LA 1239-1	US 71 and LA 34	1955	current	Was a portion of SR 1105 before 1955																														
LA 1240	7.478	12.035	US 71 northwest of Aloha	LA 122 in Verda	1955	current	Was Route C-1432 before 1955																														
LA 1241	4.794	7.715	US 71 southeast of Rock Hill	US 167 in Prospect	1955	current																															
LA 1242	0.198	0.319	LA 3210 in Chase	Willie Hill Road	1998	current																															
LA 1243	3.253	5.235	LA 488 southwest of Alexandria	LA 28 in Alexandria	1998	current																															
LA 1244	—	—	LA 31	I-49 frontage road in Opelousas	1998	2003	Former portion of LA 31; transferred to local control																														
LA 1245	0.430	0.692	LA 300	LA 46 east of Poydras	2002	current	Along Access Road																														
LA 1246	0.247	0.398	Woodlawn Road	LA 82 north of Abbeville	1998	current	Along Lulu Road																														
LA 1247	1.587	2.554	LA 1010 at Brule	LA 308 in Labadieville	1999	current	Former portion of LA 398																														
LA 1248	—	—	LA 30	I-10 in Baton Rouge	2001	2020	Transferred to local control; now Bluebonnet Boulevard																														
LA 1249	3.455	5.560	LA 22 east of Springfield	LA 1040 west of Hammond	2000	current																															
LA 1250	0.705	1.135	US 165 Bus.	US 167 frontage road in Pineville	2001	current	Former portion of LA 107																														
LA 1251	0.068	0.109	LA 1	LA 75 in Plaquemine	2001	current																															
LA 1252	6.000	9.656	I-49 frontage road north of Carencro	Lafayette–St. Martin parish line northeast of Carencro	2002	current	Former portion of LA 726																														
LA 1253	0.550	0.885	Morrison Road and Downman Road	I-10 in New Orleans	2002	current	Was SR 2200 before 1955 and LA 3021 from 1955-2002																														
LA 1254	0.472	0.760	Dead end at US 167 right-of-way	US 165 and US 165 Bus. in Pineville	2002	current	Former portion of LA 1203																														
LA 1255	0.135	0.217	US 167 to the western side of the Kansas City Southern Railway overpass in Jonesboro	South Hudson Avenue	2004	current	Along South Hudson Avenue; former US 167																														
LA 1256	2.298	3.698	LA 27/LA 108 in Carlyss	I-10 in Sulphur	2003	current	Former LA 27 Bus.																														
LA 1257	0.650	1.046	US 425	Entrance of Chemin-A-Haut State Park northeast of Bastrop	2006	current																															
LA 1258	0.316	0.509	LA 498 in Alexandria	Old Boyce Road	2007	current	Along Old Boyce Road																														
LA 1259	0.617	0.993	Government Drive and South River Road	LA 3002 in Denham Springs	2009	current																															
LA 1260	—	—	Vermilion River at Bancker	LA 330	2008	2015	Former portion of LA 690; transferred to local control																														
LA 1261	2.263	3.642	LA 23	Peters Road south of Belle Chasse	2015	current	Along Peters Road																														
LA 1262	0.525	0.845	Broad Street	I-10/US 90 in Lake Charles	2011	current	Along North Lakeshore Drive																														
LA 1263	—	—	Ferdinand Street	US 61 and LA 10 in St. Francisville	2011	2018	Former portion of LA 10; transferred to local control																														
LA 1264	0.824	1.326	Leon C. Simon Drive, Lakeshore Drive, and Leroy Johnson Drive in New Orleans	Leon C. Simon Drive, Stars and Stripes Boulevard, and Downman Road	2012	current																															
LA 1265	1.671	2.689	Thomas Sanders Road	LA 153 south of Ashland	2014	current																															
LA 1266	2.076	3.341	Palmetto Island State Park entrance	LA 690 south of Abbeville	2015	current	Along Pleasant Drive																														
LA 1267	—	—	Barksdale Air Force Base	I-220 in Shreveport	2023	current	Construction started 2019, partly opened 2023, will be fully completed in December 2025; exit 17b on I-220; future exit 26 on I-20																														
LA 1268	5.75	9.25	US 165/LA 2 west of Bastrop	US 165/US 425/LA 2 in Bastrop	2022	current																															
LA 1269	0.02	0.032	—	—	2023	current	Located in West Baton Rouge, Louisiana																														
LA 1270	0.5	0.80	LA 77 in Grosse Tete	Dead end at Garner Lane and Locust Street	2025	current																															
LA 1271	3.46	5.57	—	—	2002	current	Located in Sabine and Natchitoches Parishes {{routelist row	state=LA	type=LA	route=1274	length_mi=0.80	length_ref=	terminus_a=	terminus_b=	established=	decommissioned=yes	notes=Replaced by Dakin Street {{routelist row	state=LA	type=LA	route=1275	length_mi=0.5	length_ref=	terminus_a=	terminus_b=	established=1998	decommissioned=	notes=Located in LaSalle Parish {routelist row	state=LA	type=LA	route=1282	length_mi=0.95	length_ref=	terminus_a=	terminus_b=	established=2002	decommissioned=2020	notes=Located in Franklin Parish
Former

=== LA 3000 to LA 3099 ===
Number	Length (mi)	Length (km)	Southern or western terminus	Northern or eastern terminus	Formed	Removed	Notes
LA 3000	1.354	2.179	Ramah	LA 76 west of Rosedale	1955	current	
LA 3001	0.89	1.43	Goldridge	—	—	—	
LA 3002	2.54	4.09	LA 1034	US 190/LA 16 in Denham Springs	1955	current	Along Range Avenue
LA 3003	1.72	2.77	LA 1032	LA 16 in Denham Springs	1955	current	
LA 3004	—	—	—	—	1955	1989	
LA 3005	3.55	5.71	Simsboro	Grambling	—	—	
LA 3006	2.53	4.07	LA 19	LA 67 in Baker	1955	current	Along Lavey Lane
LA 3007	3.52	5.66	Ebenezer	—	—	—	
LA 3008	8.25	13.28	—	—	—	—	
LA 3009	2.96	4.76	—	—	—	—	
LA 3010	—	—	—	—	—	1961	
LA 3011	1.50	2.41	PR 63	LA 57	1955	current	Along Grand Caillou Road
LA 3012	1.46	2.35	Ruston	—	—	—	
LA 3013	—	—	—	—	—	2004	
LA 3014	0.57	0.92	US 371	LA 160 in Cotton Valley	1955	current	
LA 3015	18.90	30.42	Longstreet	Grand Cane	—	—	
LA 3016	—	—	—	—	—	1964	
LA 3017	9.10	14.65	LA 18 in Harvey	LA 23 in Belle Chasse	1955	current	
LA 3018	0.73	1.17	US 90 Business (Westbank Expressway)	LA 18 (4th Street)	1955	current	Along Destrehan Avenue; was Route C-2052 before 1955
LA 3019	0.48	0.77	East side of the 17th Street Canal bridge	I-10/I-610	1955	current	Was a portion of Route C-2200 before 1955
LA 3020	3.18	5.12	Lake Charles	—	—	—	
LA 3021	1.84	2.96	LA 39/LA 46	US 90 (Gentilly Boulevard)	1955	current	Along Elysian Fields Avenue in New Orleans; was a portion of Route C-2200 before 1955
LA 3022	—	—	—	—	—	1960	Internal designation for the Baton Rouge Expressway
LA 3023	—	—	—	—	—	1960	
LA 3024	3.19	5.13	Maryland	—	—	—	
LA 3025	3.77	6.07	Lafayette	—	—	—	
LA 3026	—	—	—	—	—	1981	Now part of the Pineville Expressway (US 167)
LA 3027	—	—	—	—	—	1960	Temporary designation for I-10
LA 3028	—	—	—	—	—	1960	
LA 3029	—	—	—	—	—	1960	
LA 3030	—	—	—	—	—	1968	
LA 3031	—	—	—	—	—	1968	
LA 3032	2.32	3.73	Shreveport	Bossier City	—	—	
LA 3033	7.08	11.39	Lapine	Brownsville	—	—	
LA 3034	3.53	5.68	LA 408	LA 37/LA 64 in Central	1955	current	
LA 3035	—	—	—	—	—	1987	
LA 3036	1.19	1.92	Shreveport	—	—	—	
LA 3037	2.30	3.70	Jonesville	—	—	—	
LA 3038	0.64	1.03	Gonzales	—	—	—	
LA 3039	6.49	10.44	Parks	Patin	—	—	
LA 3040	6.27	10.09	LA 24 in Bayou Cane	LA 661 in Houma	1955	current	
LA 3041	1.34	2.16	—	—	—	—	
LA 3042	11.13	17.91	Ville Platte	St. Landry	—	—	
LA 3043	6.88	11.07	Prairie Ronde	Opelousas	—	—	
LA 3044	2.47	3.98	—	—	—	—	
LA 3045	0.49	0.79	Baton Rouge	—	—	—	exit 1E on I-110
LA 3046	0.96	1.54	US 90 in Jefferson	US 61 in Metairie	1957	current	
LA 3047	—	—	—	—	—	1961	
LA 3048	6.45	10.38	Rayville	—	—	—	
LA 3049	22.76	36.63	US 71/LA 1 in Shreveport	US 71 in Gilliam	1955	current	
LA 3050	1.59	2.56	Morganza	—	—	—	
LA 3051	6.11	9.83	Bastrop	—	—	—	
LA 3052	—	—	LA 311 near Gray	US 90 and LA 3198 south of Raceland	c. 1962	c. 1997	Temporary designation for relocation of US 167 and US 90; route now US 90
LA 3053	—	—	—	—	—	—	
LA 3054	1.22	1.96	Alexandria	—	—	—	
LA 3055	0.59	0.95	Jennings	—	—	—	
LA 3056	4.21	6.78	—	—	—	—	
LA 3057	—	—	Loop off US 61 in St. Francisville		1959	2018	
LA 3059	11.42	18.38	Moss Bluff	Iowa	—	—	
LA 3060	1.16	1.87	US 90	LA 18 (River Road) in Luling	1960	current	Along Barton Avenue
LA 3061	5.29	8.51	Ruston	—	—	—	
LA 3062	4.94	7.95	Homer	—	—	—	
LA 3063	4.80	7.72	Vinton	—	—	—	exit 7 on I-10
LA 3064	1.86	2.99	former LA 42 (Burbank Dr)	LA 73 (Jefferson Highway) in Baton Rouge	1960	current	Along Staring Lane and Essen Lane; extended south from Perkins Rd in 2020
LA 3065	—	—	—	—	—	1975	
LA 3066	9.96	16.03	Crescent	Plaquemine	—	—	
LA 3067	3.77	6.07	LA 91 south of Iota	LA 370	—	—	
LA 3068	5.05	8.13	US 190	LA 97 near Basile	—	—	
LA 3069	0.18	0.29	Franklin	—	1961	current	
LA 3070	6.73	10.83	LA 370 in Ellis	LA 100 west of Crowley	—	—	
LA 3071	3.68	5.92	—	—	—	—	
LA 3072	3.31	5.33	Vienna	—	—	—	
LA 3073	9.56	15.39	US 167 in Lafayette	US 90 in Broussard	c. 1960	current	Along Ambassador Caffery Parkway
LA 3074	2.42	3.89	Simsboro	—	—	—	
LA 3075	0.26	0.42	LA 405 east of White Castle	LA 141 in St. Gabriel	c. 1960	current	
LA 3076	—	—	—	—	c. 1960	2018	
LA 3077	—	—	—	—	—	1999	
LA 3078	0.45	0.72	—	—	—	—	
LA 3079	1.08	1.74	LA 593	LA 138 north of Collinston	1960	current	
LA 3080	—	—	—	—	—	2000	
LA 3081	2.17	3.49	US 11/LA 41 in Pearl River	I-59/US 11 in Pearl River	1965	current	Former routing of US 11/US 90 and former LA 41 Spur
LA 3082	—	—	LA 39/LA 3021 in New Orleans	LA 47 in Chalmette	1962	1967	Temporary designation for relocation of LA 39; route now LA 39
LA 3083	3.98	6.41	Coteau Holmes	—	—	—	
LA 3084	—	—	—	—	—	1964	
LA 3085	—	—	—	—	—	1964	
LA 3086	7.05	11.35	—	—	—	—	
LA 3087	5.03	8.10	LA 24 in Houma	LA 182 in Savoie	1968	current	
LA 3089	2.78	4.47	LA 1/LA 18 in Donaldsonville	LA 70	1964	current	
LA 3090	3.47	5.58	Port Fourchon	LA 1	1965	current	Along A. O. Rappelet Road
LA 3091	2.52	4.06	LA 620	LA 413 north of Erwinville	1960	current	
LA 3092	6.42	10.33	Lake Charles	—	—	—	
LA 3093	4.01	6.45	Wright	—	—	—	
LA 3094	3.99	6.42	Shreveport	—	—	—	
LA 3095	—	—	—	—	—	—	
LA 3096	2.55	4.10	—	—	—	—	
LA 3097	2.06	3.32	Ville Platte	—	—	—	
LA 3098	3.91	6.29	US 165 in Georgetown	LA 1230 on the Winn Parish line	c. 1960	current	
LA 3099	2.88	4.63	DeRidder	—	—	—	
Former

=== LA 3100 to LA 3199 ===
Number	Length (mi)	Length (km)	Southern or western terminus	Northern or eastern terminus	Formed	Removed	Notes
LA 3100	0.925	1.489	US 165 Bus.	US 167 and LA 28 in Pineville	1964	current	
LA 3101	3.77	6.07	—	—	—	—	
LA 3102	9.33	15.02	Larto	Argo	—	—	
LA 3103	—	—	US 84 in Mansfield	US 84 in Mansfield	c. 1960	c. 2000	Former portion of US 84
LA 3104	1.03	1.66	Midway	—	—	—	
LA 3105	6.21	9.99	Bossier City	—	—	—	
LA 3106	—	—	—	—	—	—	
LA 3107	—	—	LA 309 west of Thibodaux	LA 20 in Thibodaux	c. 1960	2016	
LA 3108	—	—	—	—	—	—	
LA 3110	—	—	LA 1 in Natchitoches	LA 1 in Natchitoches	1975	1980	Temporary designation for the LA 1 bypass; route now LA 1
LA 3111	—	—	—	—	—	—	
LA 3112	0.61	0.98	Toomey	—	—	—	
LA 3113	—	—	—	—	1960	2018	
LA 3114	—	—	US 190 near Covington	LA 25 near Covington	c. 1967	1971	Became a portion of US 190
LA 3115	2.50	4.02	LA 75	LA 74 in St. Gabriel	c. 1970	current	
LA 3116	2.39	3.85	Eunice	—	—	—	
LA 3117	—	—	—	—	—	1971	
LA 3118	1.26	2.03	Fort Jesup	—	—	—	
LA 3119	—	—	—	—	—	1968	
LA 3120	1.02	1.64	LA 18	LA 70 east of Donaldsonville	c. 1975	current	Former routing of LA 3089
LA 3121	6.064	9.759	LA 15 in Spearsville	LA 558 at Lockhart	c. 1975	current	
LA 3122	—	—	—	—	—	—	
LA 3123	1.89	3.04	LA 755 in Eunice	LA 13	1970	current	
LA 3124	3.63	5.84	Bogalusa	—	—	—	
LA 3125	13.78	22.18	LA 70 south of Sorrento	LA 641/LA 3213 east of Gramercy	1970	current	
LA 3126	—	—	—	—	—	—	
LA 3127	42.1	67.8	LA 70 east of Donaldsonville	I-310/US 90 in Boutte	c. 1975	current	Longest 4 digit highway in Louisiana
LA 3128	4.17	6.71	Kolin	Libuse	—	—	
LA 3129	—	—	—	—	—	—	
LA 3130	1.54	2.48	Nugent	—	—	—	
LA 3131	—	—	LA 1 in New Roads	LA 1/LA 10	c. 1970	2011	Became a portion of LA 1; old route of LA 1 now LA 1 Business
LA 3132	10.21	16.43	I-20/I-220 in Shreveport	LA 523 in Shreveport	1977	current	
LA 3133	—	—	—	—	—	—	
LA 3134	6.92	11.14	LA 45 in Jean Lafitte	LA 45 in Estelle	c. 1976	current	
LA 3136	0.72	1.16	Parish Road 817	LA 34 in Atlanta	1970	current	
LA 3137	3.44	5.54	LA 39 opposite the Mississippi River	LA 39	c. 1968	current	Former routing of LA 39
LA 3138	—	—	—	—	—	—	
LA 3139	5.10	8.21	Monroe Street in New Orleans	LA 3154 in Elmwood	c. 1971	current	
LA 3140	0.91	1.46	US 61 (Airline Highway) southeast of Sorrento	Private road	c. 1970	current	
LA 3141	1.27	2.04	LA 3127	LA 18 (River Road) in Killona	c. 1975	current	
LA 3142	1.56	2.51	LA 3127	LA 18 (River Road) in Taft	c. 1975	current	
LA 3143	3.12	5.02	—	—	—	—	
LA 3144	1.93	3.11	US 165 Business	LA 28 in Pineville	c. 1970	current	
LA 3146	—	—	LA 46	LA 39 in Violet	c. 1975	1980	
LA 3147	9.99	16.08	—	—	—	—	
LA 3148	3.25	5.23	Elam	—	—	—	
LA 3149	3.62	5.83	Mamou	Reddell	—	—	
LA 3150	0.29	0.47	LA 1	near Louisiana Avenue in Grand Isle	1972	current	Was LA 574-10 before 1972
LA 3151	1.12	1.80	LA 1 in Grand Isle	LA 1 in Grand Isle	1972	current	Was LA 574-11 before 1972
LA 3152	4.27	6.87	US 90/LA 48 in Elmwood	I-10 in Metairie	1972	current	Was SR 1245 before 1955 and LA 611-10 from 1955-1972
LA 3153	—	—	US 61 (Airline Highway)	West Metairie Avenue in Metairie	1972	c. 1986	Was SR 1246 before 1955 and LA 611-11 from 1955-1972; transferred to local control
LA 3154	3.16	5.09	LA 48 in Harahan	US 61 in Metairie	1972	current	Was LA 611-12 before 1972
LA 3155	0.50	0.80	Russell Avenue in River Ridge	US 61 (Airline Drive) in Metairie	1972	current	Was SR 2220 before 1955 and LA 611-13 from 1955-1972
LA 3156	0.21	0.34	West St. Peter Street in New Iberia	Front Street and Indest Street	1972	current	
LA 3158	2.29	3.69	I-12 southeast of Hammond	US 190 in Hammond	1970	current	
LA 3159	3.24	5.21	—	—	—	2018	
LA 3160	2.36	3.80	LA 3127	LA 18 in Hahnville	1975	current	
LA 3161	0.73	1.17	LA 3235	LA 1 in Cut Off	1975	current	
LA 3162	0.70	1.13	LA 3235	LA 308 in Galliano	1975	current	
LA 3163	2.58	4.15	Kraft	—	—	—	
LA 3164	1.03	1.66	Baton Rouge	—	—	—	exit 2A on I-110
LA 3165	1.36	2.19	—	—	—	—	
LA 3166	1.81	2.91	cul-de-sac alongside the Mermentau River	LA 1126 south of Jennings	1970	current	
LA 3168	0.67	1.08	US 90	I-10 in Scott	c. 1979	current	Former LA 93 Truck; co-designated with LA 93
LA 3169	1.04	1.67	LA 8 near Colfax	US 71/LA 8	—	—	
LA 3170	5.53	8.90	Chambers	Whittington	—	—	
LA 3171	—	—	—	—	—	2018	
LA 3172	—	—	—	—	—	2019	
LA 3173	1.26	2.03	LA 105 (South Levee Road) in Krotz Springs	US 190	c. 1973	current	
LA 3174	0.92	1.48	US 190 in Krotz Springs	LA 3173 (9th Avenue)	c. 1973	current	Was part of SR 7 before 1955 and part of LA 105 from 1955-1973
LA 3175	—	—	LA 6 in Natchitoches	LA 1 bypass (now LA 6) in Natchitoches	c. 1980	1994	Became part of LA 6
LA 3177	5.87	9.45	Butte la Rose	Atchafalaya	—	—	
LA 3178	0.23	0.37	LA 3173 in Krotz Springs	LA 105	c. 1973	current	
LA 3179	1.86	2.99	LA 44	US 61 in Reserve	c. 1970	current	
LA 3180	2.16	3.48	Taconey	Vidalia	—	—	
LA 3181	2.88	4.63	Lake Providence	—	—	—	
LA 3182	0.16	0.26	LA 182	LA 87 in Jeanerette	1980	current	
LA 3184	2.19	3.52	LA 3025	I-10 in Lafayette	c. 1980	current	
LA 3185	5.26	8.47	LA 308 west of Thibodaux	LA 20 in Schriever	c. 1980	current	
LA 3186	2.04	3.28	Lake Charles	—	—	—	
LA 3187	9.76	15.71	Pine Prairie	Turkey Creek	—	—	
LA 3188	2.80	4.51	US 61	I-10 in LaPlace	c. 1983	current	
LA 3190	0.41	0.66	Angola Ferry	—	—	—	
LA 3191	3.28	5.28	Calvert Acres	Natchitoches	—	—	Former routing of LA 1
LA 3192	—	—	—	—	—	—	
LA 3193	1.62	2.61	LA 44	LA 3125 in Lutcher	c. 1980	current	
LA 3194	3.54	5.70	LA 173	US 71/LA 1 in Shreveport	c. 1980	current	
LA 3195	1.82	2.93	LA 182	LA 86/LA 344 east of New Iberia	c. 1980	current	
LA 3196	11.40	18.35	Ridgecrest	Spokane	—	—	
LA 3197	0.49	0.79	LA 182/LA 315	LA 182 (Barrow Street)	1977	current	Former portion of US 90
LA 3198	—	—	US 90 (Exit 210) and LA 3052	LA 1 in Raceland	c. 1977	c. 1997	Former routing of US 90, became a portion of LA 182
LA 3199	—	—	US 90 (Exit 210) and LA 3052	LA 1 in Raceland	c. 1977	c. 1997	Former routing of US 90, became a portion of LA 182
Former

=== LA 3200 to LA 3299 ===
Number	Length (mi)	Length (km)	Southern or western terminus	Northern or eastern terminus	Formed	Removed	Notes
LA 3200	—	—	—	—	—	—	
LA 3201	1.57	2.53	LA 4 in Winnsboro	US 425 in Winnsboro	—	—	
LA 3202	1.18	1.90	US 65 in Tallulah	LA 601 in Richmond	—	—	
LA 3203	1.77	2.85	LA 907 in Catahoula Parish	LA 600 in Catahoula Parish	—	—	
LA 3205	0.87	1.40	LA 10 near Oakdale	South River Road near Oakdale	—	—	
LA 3206	0.79	1.27	LA 10 / LA 112 in Elizabeth	LA 1156 in Elizabeth	—	—	
LA 3209	1.02	1.64	US 65 in Waterproof	LA 568 in Waterproof	—	—	
LA 3210	1.71	2.75	LA 1242	US 425 and LA 15 in Chase	1982	current	Former routing of LA 15
LA 3211	1.91	3.07	US 90	LA 182 in Franklin	1980	current	
LA 3212	2.45	3.94	Charlotte	Independent	—	—	
LA 3213	6.60	10.62	LA 3127 west of Edgard	LA 641 and LA 3125 east of Gramercy	1995	current	
LA 3214	1.80	2.90	LA 44	LA 3125 north of Convent	1982	current	
LA 3215	0.56	0.90	US 90	LA 182 in Garden City	1955	current	
LA 3217	1.35	2.17	LA 628	US 61 in LaPlace	1980	current	
LA 3218	2.30	3.70	US 80 west of Delta	Old Vicksburg Bridge across the Mississippi River at Delta	1980	current	Former routing of US 80
LA 3219	1.23	1.98	LA 3127	LA 18 at Lagan	1982	current	
LA 3220	0.08	0.13	LA 1 south of Lockport	LA 308 south of Lockport	1986	current	
LA 3221	—	—	—	—	—	—	
LA 3223	0.38	0.61	—	—	—	2013	
LA 3224	0.28	0.45	LA 44 in LaPlace	US 61 in LaPlace	—	—	
LA 3225	4.39	7.07	US 71 and US 167	US 71 northwest of Pineville	1981	current	Former routing of US 71/US 167
LA 3226	7.56	12.17	US 190 near DeRidder	US 171 near Rosepine	—	—	
LA 3227	2.17	3.49	LA 157 in Haughton	LA 164 in Haughton	—	—	
LA 3228	—	—	US 190 in Mandeville	US 190 east frontage road just north of Mandeville	1980	2018	Former US 190; transferred to local control
LA 3229	4.19	6.74	LA 482 near Zwolle	Blue Lake Launch	—	—	
LA 3231	—	—	I-220	US 79/US 80 in Shreveport	1980	2000	Returned to local control
LA 3232	0.83	1.34	LA 15 in Ferriday	US 425 / US 85 in Ferriday	—	—	
LA 3233	1.27	2.04	LA 182	I-49 and US 167 south of Opelousas	1980	current	
LA 3234	2.78	4.47	Hammond	LA 1065 in Hammond	1986	current	
LA 3235	16.02	25.78	LA 1 south of Golden Meadow	LA 24 in Larose	1985	current	
LA 3237	0.77	1.24	Port Allen	—	—	—	
LA 3238	—	—	LA 46	LA 39 in Chalmette	1980	2014	Returned to local control
LA 3239	3.18	5.12	LA 126 near Grayson	LA 4 near Grayson	—	—	
LA 3240	—	—	US 61	LA 48	—	—	
LA 3241	5.6	9.0	LA 435 at Talisheek	LA 40/LA 41 at Bush	2024	current	Planned to extend south to I-12/LA 434 in Lacombe
LA 3242	5.56	8.95	Loreauville	Dauterive Landing	—	—	
LA 3244	—	—	—	—	—	2010	
LA 3245	—	—	South Harrell's Ferry Road	US 190 in Baton Rouge	1980	2018	Returned to local control
LA 3246	—	—	LA 42 south of Baton Rouge	US 61/LA 73 in Baton Rouge	1980	2023	Returned to local control
LA 3247	1.62	2.61	LA 1171	LA 29 northeast of Ville Platte	c. 1991	current	Former routing of LA 29
LA 3248	3.66	5.89	Naborton	—	—	—	
LA 3249	0.61	0.98	I-20 frontage road in West Monroe	US 80 and LA 15	1980	current	Unsigned
LA 3250	0.500	0.805	US 71/US-Bus 167 (MacArthur Drive) in Alexandria	LA 1208-4 (Eddie Williams Avenue) in Alexandria	c. 1996	current	
LA 3251	3.767	6.062	LA 75 near Gonzales	LA 30 near Gonzales	1990	current	
LA 3252	6.686	10.760	LA 573 near Waterproof	LA 892 in Mayflower	1990	current	
LA 3253	0.799	1.286	I-49/US 167 Service Road in Opelousas	US 190 (East Vine Street, East Landry Street) in Opelousas	c. 1993	current	
LA 3254	0.715	1.151	LA 31/LA 347 in Leonville	End state maintenance at Oscar Rivette Street and Garland Road	1990	current	
LA 3255	1.995	3.211	LA 961 and Peterson Road southwest of Felixville	LA 432 in Felixville	c. 1993	current	
LA 3256	3.069	4.939	US 90 near Lake Charles	I-10 Service Road	c. 1993	current	
LA 3257	5.790	9.318	Dead end at Bayou Rigolettes	LA 302 (Fisherman Boulevard) in Barataria	c. 1993	current	
LA 3258	3.756	6.045	I-10 Service Road in Calcasieu	I-10 Service Road	c. 1993	current	
LA 3259	0.961	1.547	LA 125 (East Hardtner Drive, South Pine Street) in Urania	US 165 in Urania	c. 1993	current	Former LA 125 Spur
LA 3260	—	—	US 190	US 51 in Hammond	c. 1993	2018	Returned to local control
LA 3261	—	—	Shrewsbury Road and Lausat Street	US 61 (Airline Drive) and LA 611-9 (Severn Avenue) in Metairie	1993	2010	Former portion of LA 611-3; returned to local control
LA 3262	—	—	LA 3139	LA 611-9 in Metairie	1993	2010	Former portion of LA 611-4; returned to local control
LA 3263	—	—	LA 107	LA 28 east of Pineville	—	—	
LA 3264	0.709	1.141	LA 124 near Jonesville	End state maintenance on Trinity Road in Trinity	1990	current	
LA 3265	2.930	4.715	US 165 in Woodworth	PR 22 (Robinson Bridge Road) near Lecompte	c. 1992	current	
LA 3266	1.296	2.086	LA 308 (Bayou Road) in Thibodaux	End state maintenance at Forty Arpent Road	1990	current	
LA 3267	3.794	6.106	LA 82 (LA 82 Truck begins) in Abbeville	LA 14/LA 82 Truck in Abbeville	1990	current	Concurrent with LA 82 Truck
LA 3269	0.124	0.200	LA 15 in Spearsville	LA 15 in Spearsville	1990	current	Loop off LA 15
LA 3272	1.15	1.85	—	—	1960	current	Located in Tangipahoa Parish
LA 3273	—	—	LA 427	Dawson Creek	1990	2024	Valley Street
LA 3274	2.580	4.152	LA 44 in Gramercy	US 61 in Gramercy	1997	current	Former portion of LA 20
LA 3275	0.373	0.600	US 80/US-Bus 165 in Monroe	US 165 (Sterlington Road, Martin Luther King Jr. Drive) /US 80	1997	current	
LA 3276	4.791	7.710	US 171 in Stonewall	PR 16 near Stonewall	1991	current	
LA 3277	10.380	16.705	US 190 (Basile–Eunice Highway) in Basille	LA 104 near Mamou	1994	current	Was LA 371 before 1994
LA 3278	2.064	3.322	LA 504 in Natchitoches	LA 6 (University Parkway) in Natchitoches	1990	current	Former routing of LA 6
LA 3279	2.361	3.800	LA 1 near Lena	LA 490 near Lena	1990	current	
LA 3280	0.180	0.290	Begin state maintenance at Coleman Avenue and South Riverfront Street in West Monroe	End state maintenance at DeSiard Street in Monroe	1990	current	
LA 3281	0.378	0.608	Begin state maintenance on Park Street	LA 15/LA 33 (South Main Street) in Farmerville	1990	current	
LA 3282	—	—	LA 16	LA 1031 in Denham Springs	1990	2017	Returned to local control
LA 3283	—	—	Livingston	Livingston	1990	2020	
LA 3284	—	—	LA 840-6	US 165 in Monroe	1990	2002	Returned to local control
LA 3285	—	—	LA 1019	LA 16 in Watson	1990	2013	Former LA 16 Spur
LA 3286	—	—	Begin state maintenance on Linda Ann Avenue	LA 24	—	—	
LA 3289	0.18	0.29	—	—	1955	current	Endom Bridge
LA 3290	0.2	0.32	—	—	1955	current	Located in East Baton Rouge, Louisiana
LA 3290-1	0.09	0.14	—	—	1955	current	Located in East Baton Rouge, Louisiana
LA 3290-2	0.01	0.016	—	—	1955	current	Located in East Baton Rouge, Louisiana
LA 3290-3	0.01	0.016	—	—	1955	current	Located in East Baton Rouge, Louisiana
LA 3290-4	0.01	0.016	—	—	1955	current	Located in East Baton Rouge, Louisiana
Former; Unbuilt or under construction

== Unbuilt state highways ==
- LA 3145: unbuilt Ivanhoe–Jeanerette highway (1970s)

== See also ==
- List of state highways in Louisiana (pre-1955)
