= Louisiana Highway 3127 =

Highway in Louisiana

Louisiana Highway 3127

Route information
- Maintained by Louisiana DOTD
- Length: 42.1 mi (67.8 km)
- Existed: c. 1975–present

Major junctions
- West end: LA 70 east of Donaldsonville
- LA 20 in North Vacherie LA 3213 in North Vacherie; LA 640 in Edgard I-310 in Luling
- East end: I-310 / Future I-49 / US 90 in Boutte

Location
- Country: United States
- State: Louisiana
- Parishes: Ascension, St. James, St. John the Baptist, St. Charles

Highway system
- Louisiana State Highway System; Interstate; US; State; Scenic
← LA 3126	→ LA 3128

Louisiana Highway 3127 (LA 3127) is a state highway in Louisiana that serves Ascension, St. James, St. John the Baptist, and St. Charles Parishes. It spans 42.1 miles (67.8 km) in a northwest to southeast direction. It parallels LA 18 along the west bank of the Mississippi River, providing a much shorter inland bypass of the River Road. It is bannered in all four cardinal directions depending upon the part of the route.

== Route description ==
Throughout its length, LA 3127 was built to eventually accommodate four lanes of traffic, as the land throughout its routing has been cleared for this accommodation. From the northwest, LA 3127 begins at a junction with LA 70 east of Donaldsonville and immediately enters St. James Parish. Undivided, two lanes, and largely secluded for the first several miles, it heads eastward and intersects LA 3219 near the community of St. James. Near Vacherie, it intersects LA 20. Continuing eastward, the route crosses into St. John the Baptist Parish before a junction with LA 640 south of Edgard. As LA 3127 crosses into St. Charles Parish, the highway turns toward the southeast. Shortly afterward, it divides and expands to four lanes. Access to the river communities of Killona, Taft, and Hahnville as well as many chemical and industrial facilities are provided via junctions with LA 3141, LA 3142, and LA 3160, respectively.

The final 1.1 miles (1.8 km) of LA 3127 consist of a concurrency with I-310, beginning at Exit 10. Both highways end at signaled intersection/interchange with US 90 just west of Boutte. As US 90 is slated to be upgraded to interstate standards (as Interstate 49), there are plans to massively reconfigure both the interchanges.

An extension of LA 3213 (which crosses the Mississippi River via the Veterans Memorial Bridge) to connect with LA 3127 opened in June 2008. This junction is between LA 20 and LA 640.

== Major intersections ==
Parish	Location	mi	km	Destinations	Notes
Ascension		0.0	0.0	LA 70 – Donaldsonville, Mississippi River Bridge	
St. James		12.5	20.1	LA 3219 – St. James, Lagan	Southern terminus of LA 3219
St. James	North Vacherie	18.4	29.6	LA 20 – Vacherie, Thibodaux	
St. James	North Vacherie	20.7	33.3	LA 3213 north – Mississippi River Bridge, Gramercy	Southern terminus of LA 3213
St. John the Baptist	Edgard	28.7	46.2	LA 640 – Reserve	Southern terminus of LA 640
St. Charles	Killona	32.8	52.8	LA 3141 (Mary Plantation Road) – Killona	Southern terminus of LA 3141
St. Charles	Killona	35.5	57.1	LA 3142 – Taft	Southern terminus of LA 3142
St. Charles	Hahnville	37.4	60.2	LA 3160 (Home Place) – Hahnville	Southern terminus of LA 3160
St. Charles	Luling	41.0	66.0	I-310 north – New Orleans	North end of freeway and I-310 concurrency; Exit 10 (I-310)
St. Charles	Boutte	42.1	67.8	US 90 – Boutte-New Orleans, Houma	Southern terminus of I-310; South end of freeway and I-310 concurrency (no exit number)
1.000 mi = 1.609 km; 1.000 km = 0.621 mi: Concurrency terminus
