= List of state highways in Louisiana (3200–3249) =

The following is a list of state highways in the U.S. state of Louisiana designated in the 3200-3249 range.

== Louisiana Highway 3201 ==
Louisiana Highway 3201
- Location: Winnsboro
- Length: 1.57 mi (2.53 km)

Louisiana Highway 3201 (LA 3201) runs 1.57 miles (2.53 km) in Winnsboro.

== Louisiana Highway 3202 ==
Louisiana Highway 3202
- Location: Tallulah–Richmond
- Length: 1.18 mi (1.90 km)

Louisiana Highway 3202 (LA 3202) runs 1.18 miles (1.90 km) from Tallulah to Richmond.

== Louisiana Highway 3203 ==
Louisiana Highway 3203
- Location: Concordia Parish–Catahoula Parish
- Length: 1.77 mi (2.85 km)

Louisiana Highway 3203 (LA 3203) runs 1.77 miles (2.85 km) from Concordia Parish to Catahoula Parish.

== Louisiana Highway 3205 ==
Louisiana Highway 3205
- Location: Allen Parish
- Length: 0.87 mi (1,400 m)

Louisiana Highway 3205 (LA 3205) runs 0.87 miles (1.40 km) in Allen Parish.

== Louisiana Highway 3206 ==
Louisiana Highway 3206
- Location: Elizabeth
- Length: 0.79 mi (1,270 m)

Louisiana Highway 3206 (LA 3206) runs 0.79 miles (1.27 km) in Elizabeth.

== Louisiana Highway 3209 ==
Louisiana Highway 3209
- Location: Waterproof
- Length: 1.02 mi (1.64 km)

Louisiana Highway 3209 (LA 3209) runs 1.02 miles (1.64 km) in Waterproof.

== Louisiana Highway 3210 ==
Louisiana Highway 3210
- Location: Chase
- Length: 1.71 mi (2.75 km)
- Existed: c. 1982–present

Louisiana Highway 3210 (LA 3210) runs 1.71 miles (2.75 km) in a north–south direction from LA 1242 to the concurrent US 425 and LA 15 in Chase, Franklin Parish. It is part of the original two-lane alignment of LA 15 bypassed around 1982.

LA 3210 heads north from LA 1242 at a point immediately east of the latter's intersection with US 425/LA 15. The route travels through the small community of Chase and intersects LA 866. Shortly afterward, LA 3210 reaches its terminus as it rejoins the divided four-lane US 425/LA 15. LA 3210 is an undivided two-lane highway for its entire length.

The entire highway is in Chase, Franklin Parish.

mi	km	Destinations	Notes
0.0	0.0	LA 1242	Southern terminus
1.1	1.8	LA 866	Western terminus of LA 866
1.7	2.7	US 425 / LA 15	Northern terminus
1.000 mi = 1.609 km; 1.000 km = 0.621 mi

== Louisiana Highway 3211 ==
Louisiana Highway 3211
- Location: Franklin
- Length: 1.91 mi (3.07 km)
- Existed: 1980s–present

Louisiana Highway 3211 (LA 3211) runs 1.91 miles (3.07 km) in a southwest to northeast direction along Northwest Boulevard from US 90 to LA 182 in Franklin, St. Mary Parish. The route connects Franklin with the US 90 freeway.

The entire highway is in Franklin, St. Mary Parish.

mi	km	Destinations	Notes
0.0	0.0	US 90	Southern terminus; exit 152 on US 90
1.9	3.1	LA 182	Northern terminus
1.000 mi = 1.609 km; 1.000 km = 0.621 mi

== Louisiana Highway 3212 ==
Louisiana Highway 3212
- Location: Charlotte–Independent
- Length: 2.45 mi (3.94 km)

Louisiana Highway 3212 (LA 3212) runs 2.45 miles (3.94 km) from Charlotte to Independent.

== Louisiana Highway 3213 ==
Louisiana Highway 3213
- Location: Gramercy
- Length: 6.60 mi (10.62 km)
- Existed: c. 1995–present

Louisiana Highway 3213 (LA 3213) runs 6.60 miles (10.62 km) in a north–south direction from LA 3127 west of Edgard to the junction of LA 641 and LA 3125 east of Gramercy, St. James Parish. The route consists largely of the Veterans Memorial Bridge, commonly known as the Gramercy Bridge, and its approaches.

LA 3213 heads northeast from LA 3127 and crosses from St. James Parish into St. John the Baptist Parish. After curving to the northeast, the highway has a folded diamond interchange with LA 18 just before ascending onto the Mississippi River bridge at Wallace. Midway across the river, LA 3213 crosses back into St. James Parish and has a similar interchange with LA 44 but with the northbound exit having to cross the opposite carriageway at grade. LA 3213 proceeds northward, running parallel to the eastern limit of Gramercy, and ends at a junction with LA 641 and LA 3125. The former continues straight ahead to connections with US 61 and I-10. LA 3213 is an undivided two-lane highway south of the LA 18 exit and a divided four-lane highway otherwise.

Parish	Location	mi	km	Destinations	Notes
St. James		0.0	0.0	LA 3127	Southern terminus
St. John the Baptist	Wallace	3.3– 3.9	5.3– 6.3	LA 18 – Vacherie, Edgard–Wallace	Interchange
Mississippi River		4.1– 5.6	6.6– 9.0	Veterans Memorial Bridge	
St. James		5.8– 6.1	9.3– 9.8	LA 44 – Reserve, Gramercy–Lutcher	Interchange
St. James		6.6	10.6	LA 641 to I-10 LA 3125 north	Northern terminus of LA 3213; southern terminus of LA 3125
1.000 mi = 1.609 km; 1.000 km = 0.621 mi

== Louisiana Highway 3214 ==
Louisiana Highway 3214
- Location: St. James Parish
- Length: 1.80 mi (2.90 km)
- Existed: c. 1982–present

Louisiana Highway 3214 (LA 3214) runs 1.80 miles (2.90 km) in an east–west direction from LA 44 to LA 3125 north of Convent, St. James Parish. The route is a short connector that is also the location of an Occidental Chemical Corporation facility. It is an undivided two-lane highway for its entire length.

The entire route is in St. James Parish.

mi	km	Destinations	Notes
0.0	0.0	LA 44	Western terminus
1.8	2.9	LA 3125	Eastern terminus
1.000 mi = 1.609 km; 1.000 km = 0.621 mi

== Louisiana Highway 3215 ==
Louisiana Highway 3215
- Location: Garden City
- Length: 0.56 mi (900 m)
- Existed: 1980s–present

Louisiana Highway 3215 (LA 3215) runs 0.56 miles (0.90 km) in a north–south direction from US 90 to LA 182 in Garden City, St. Mary Parish. The route is a short connector between US 90 and its pre-freeway alignment (LA 182) between Franklin and Centerville. It is an undivided two-lane highway for its entire length.

The entire highway is in Garden City, St. Mary Parish.

mi	km	Destinations	Notes
0.0	0.0	US 90	Southern terminus; exit 157 on US 90
0.6	0.97	LA 182	Northern terminus
1.000 mi = 1.609 km; 1.000 km = 0.621 mi

== Louisiana Highway 3217 ==
Louisiana Highway 3217
- Location: LaPlace
- Length: 1.35 mi (2.17 km)
- Existed: 1980s–present

Louisiana Highway 3217 (LA 3217) runs 1.35 miles (2.17 km) in an east–west direction from LA 628 to US 61 in LaPlace, St. John the Baptist Parish. The route is a short connector located on the southeast side of LaPlace just east of the Bonnet Carre Spillway. It is an undivided two-lane highway for its entire length.

The entire highway is in LaPlace, St. John the Baptist Parish.

mi	km	Destinations	Notes
0.0	0.0	LA 628 (River Road)	Southern terminus
1.3	2.1	US 61 (East Airline Highway)	Northern terminus
1.000 mi = 1.609 km; 1.000 km = 0.621 mi

== Louisiana Highway 3218 ==
Louisiana Highway 3218
- Location: Delta
- Length: 2.30 mi (3.70 km)
- Existed: 1980–present

Louisiana Highway 3218 (LA 3218) runs 2.30 miles (3.70 km) in an east–west direction from US 80 west of Delta to the foot of the Old Vicksburg Bridge across the Mississippi River at Delta, Madison Parish.

The route is the state-maintained approach to the bridge, built in 1930 and now closed to vehicular traffic. It was part of US 80 before that highway was re-routed onto the parallel I-20 bridge into Vicksburg, Mississippi in 1980. LA 3218 is an undivided two-lane highway for its entire length.

The entire highway is in Madison Parish.

Location	mi	km	Destinations	Notes
	0.0	0.0	US 80 to I-20	Western terminus
Delta	2.3	3.7	End state maintenance at foot of Old Vicksburg Bridge	Eastern terminus
1.000 mi = 1.609 km; 1.000 km = 0.621 mi

== Louisiana Highway 3219 ==
Louisiana Highway 3219
- Location: Lagan
- Length: 1.23 mi (1.98 km)
- Existed: c. 1982–present

Louisiana Highway 3219 (LA 3219) runs 1.23 miles (1.98 km) in a north–south direction from LA 3127 to LA 18 at Lagan, St. James Parish. The route is a short connector in an area commonly known as St. James.

The entire highway is in St. James Parish.

Location	mi	km	Destinations	Notes
	0.0	0.0	LA 3127	Southern terminus
Lagan	1.2	1.9	LA 18 (River Road)	Northern terminus
1.000 mi = 1.609 km; 1.000 km = 0.621 mi

== Louisiana Highway 3220 ==
Louisiana Highway 3220
- Location: Lafourche Parish
- Length: 0.08 mi (130 m)
- Existed: 1986–present

Louisiana Highway 3220 (LA 3220) runs 0.08 miles (0.13 km) and consists of the Belle Vue Swing Bridge over Bayou Lafourche that connects LA 1 and LA 308 south of Lockport, Lafourche Parish. The bridge was constructed in 1986 and carries two lanes of traffic.

The entire route is in Lafourche Parish.

mi	km	Destinations	Notes
0.0	0.0	LA 1	Western terminus
0.1	0.16	LA 308	Eastern terminus
1.000 mi = 1.609 km; 1.000 km = 0.621 mi

== Louisiana Highway 3223 ==
Louisiana Highway 3223
- Location: LaPlace
- Length: 0.38 mi (610 m)
- Existed: 2013

Louisiana Highway 3223 (LA 3223) ran 0.38 miles (0.61 km) in LaPlace.

== Louisiana Highway 3224 ==
Louisiana Highway 3224
- Location: LaPlace
- Length: 0.23 mi (370 m)

Louisiana Highway 3224 (LA 3224) runs 0.23 miles (0.37 km) in LaPlace.

== Louisiana Highway 3225 ==
Louisiana Highway 3225
- Location: Rapides Parish
- Length: 4.39 mi (7.07 km)
- Existed: 1981–present

Louisiana Highway 3225 (LA 3225) runs 4.39 miles (7.07 km) in a southeast to northwest direction from the concurrent US 71 and US 167 to a second junction with US 71 northwest of Pineville, Rapides Parish. It was the original route of US 71 and US 167, as well as the earlier Jefferson Highway auto trail, before being moved onto the present freeway alignment in 1981.

LA 3225 heads north from a diamond interchange with US 71 and US 167 in an area north of Pineville known as Tioga. Curving to the northwest, the route intersects LA 623 (Singer Drive) and LA 1204, which both head to nearby Ball, located on US 165. LA 3225 then has a second intersection with US 167 at the southern limit of Creola. The highway curves to the south and shortly reaches its terminus at US 71, just west of where it splits from US 167. LA 3225 is an undivided two-lane highway for its entire length.

The entire highway is in Rapides Parish.

Location	mi	km	Destinations	Notes
Tioga	0.0	0.0	US 71 / US 167 – Alexandria, Winnfield, Shreveport	Southern terminus; interchange
Tioga	0.6	0.97	LA 623 (Singer Drive)	Southern terminus of LA 623
	2.0	3.2	LA 1204	Western terminus of LA 1204
Creola	3.8	6.1	US 167 – Winnfield	
Timber Trails	4.4	7.1	US 71 – Shreveport	Northern terminus
1.000 mi = 1.609 km; 1.000 km = 0.621 mi

== Louisiana Highway 3226 ==
Louisiana Highway 3226
- Location: DeRidder–Rosepine
- Length: 7.56 mi (12.17 km)

Louisiana Highway 3226 (LA 3226) runs 7.56 miles (12.17 km) from DeRidder to Rosepine.

== Louisiana Highway 3227 ==
Louisiana Highway 3227
- Location: Haughton
- Length: 2.17 mi (3.49 km)

Louisiana Highway 3227 (LA 3227) runs 2.17 miles (3.49 km) in an east–west direction from LA 157 in Haughton to LA 164 east of Haughton. It is an undivided two-lane highway for its entire length.

The entire highway is in Bossier Parish.

Location	mi	km	Destinations	Notes
Haughton	0.0	0.0	LA 157 – Haughton, Fillmore	Western terminus
	2.17	3.49	LA 164	Eastern terminus
1.000 mi = 1.609 km; 1.000 km = 0.621 mi

== Louisiana Highway 3228 ==
Louisiana Highway 3228
- Location: Mandeville
- Length: 0.648 mi (1,043 m)
- Existed: 1980s–2018

Louisiana Highway 3228 (LA 3228) ran 0.65 miles (1.05 km) in a north–south direction along Asbury Drive from US 190 in Mandeville to a point on the US 190 east frontage road just north of Mandeville, St. Tammany Parish. It is a remnant of the original alignment of US 190 before it became a controlled-access highway in the 1980s.

The route was transferred to local control in 2018 as part of La DOTD's Road Transfer Program. LA 3228 was an undivided two-lane highway for its entire length.

The entire highway is in St. Tammany Parish.

Location	mi	km	Destinations	Notes
Mandeville	0.000– 0.010	0.000– 0.016	US 190	Southern terminus
	0.648	1.043	End state maintenance at US 190 frontage road	Northern terminus
1.000 mi = 1.609 km; 1.000 km = 0.621 mi

== Louisiana Highway 3229 ==
Louisiana Highway 3229
- Location: Sabine Parish
- Length: 4.19 mi (6.74 km)

Louisiana Highway 3229 (LA 3229) runs 4.19 miles (6.74 km) in Sabine Parish.

== Louisiana Highway 3231 ==
Louisiana Highway 3231
- Location: Shreveport
- Length: 0.5 mi (800 m)
- Existed: 1980s–2000s

Louisiana Highway 3231 (LA 3231) ran 0.5 miles (0.80 km) in an east–west direction along Jefferson Paige Road from I-220 to the concurrent US 79 and US 80 in Shreveport, Caddo Parish.

The route was a short connector between US 79-80 and a diamond interchange with I-220, returned to local control after a reconstruction and realignment project in the 2000s.

The entire highway was in Shreveport, Caddo Parish.

mi	km	Destinations	Notes
0.0	0.0	I-220 – Monroe, Dallas	Western terminus; exit 1A on I-220
0.5	0.80	US 79 / US 80 (Greenwood Road)	Eastern terminus
1.000 mi = 1.609 km; 1.000 km = 0.621 mi

== Louisiana Highway 3232 ==
Louisiana Highway 3232
- Location: Ferriday
- Length: 0.83 mi (1,340 m)

Louisiana Highway 3232 (LA 3232) runs 0.83 miles (1.34 km) in Ferriday.

== Louisiana Highway 3233 ==
Louisiana Highway 3233
- Location: St. Landry Parish
- Length: 1.27 mi (2.04 km)
- Existed: 1980s–present

Louisiana Highway 3233 (LA 3233) runs 1.27 miles (2.04 km) in an east–west direction along Harry Guilbeau Road from LA 182 to the concurrent I-49 and US 167 south of Opelousas, St. Landry Parish.

The entire route is in St. Landry Parish.

mi	km	Destinations	Notes
0.0	0.0	LA 182	Western terminus
1.3	2.1	I-49 / US 167 – Opelousas, Lafayette	Eastern terminus; exit 15 on I-49
1.000 mi = 1.609 km; 1.000 km = 0.621 mi

== Louisiana Highway 3234 ==
Louisiana Highway 3234
- Location: Hammond
- Length: 2.78 mi (4.47 km)
- Existed: c. 1986–present

Louisiana Highway 3234 (LA 3234) runs 2.78 miles (4.47 km) in an east–west direction from a local road west of Hammond to LA 1065 in Hammond, Tangipahoa Parish. The route connects Southeastern Louisiana University with I-55 at Exit 32.

From the west, LA 3234 begins on Wardline Road, an undivided two-lane thoroughfare, at its intersection with Randall Road. The route heads due east and immediately passes through a diamond interchange with I-55. LA 3234 continues onto University Avenue as an undivided four-lane highway with a center turning lane and intersects US 51 (North Morrison Boulevard) upon entering the Hammond city limits. It then bisects the SLU campus and passes the school's University Center arena. After crossing the Canadian National Railway (CN) line at grade, the route proceeds a short distance further to a T-intersection at LA 1065 (North Cherry Street).

The entire highway is in Tangipahoa Parish.

Location	mi	km	Destinations	Notes
	0.0	0.0	Wardline Road / Randall Road	Western terminus
	0.2– 0.4	0.32– 0.64	I-55 – New Orleans, Jackson	Exit 32 on I-55
Hammond	1.5	2.4	US 51 (North Morrison Boulevard)	
Hammond	2.8	4.5	LA 1065 (North Cherry Street)	Eastern terminus
1.000 mi = 1.609 km; 1.000 km = 0.621 mi

== Louisiana Highway 3235 ==
Louisiana Highway 3235
- Location: Lafourche Parish
- Length: 16.02 mi (25.78 km)
- Existed: c. 1985–present

Louisiana Highway 3235 (LA 3235) runs 16.02 miles (25.78 km) in a north–south direction from LA 1 south of Golden Meadow to LA 24 in Larose, Lafourche Parish. The route is a four-lane bypass and truck route of LA 1, which passes through various communities situated on the west bank of Bayou Lafourche.

LA 3235 splits off of LA 1 and heads north briefly as an undivided three-lane highway with one northbound lane and two southbound lanes. Upon entering Golden Meadow, however, it widens to a divided four-lane highway. LA 3235 proceeds north and passes through the communities of Galliano and Cutoff with LA 3162 and LA 3161 serving as connectors to LA 1 at these respective locations. After about 13 miles (21 km), LA 3235 enters Larose. Shortly after intersecting LA 657, a truck route connecting to a bridge across Bayou Lafourche, the highway reaches its end at a T-intersection with LA 24, connecting to Houma via Bourg.

The entire highway is in Lafourche Parish.

Location	mi	km	Destinations	Notes
	0.0	0.0	LA 1 – Grand Isle	Southern terminus; 0.2 miles (0.32 km) south of Golden Meadow
Galliano	8.2	13.2	LA 3162 (Tarpon Pass)	Western terminus of LA 3162
Cut Off	11.7	18.8	LA 3161 (Cote Blanche Connection)	Western terminus of LA 3161
Larose	15.6	25.1	LA 657 (Larose Link)	Western terminus of LA 657
Larose	16.0	25.7	LA 24 (Bourg–Larose Highway)	Northern terminus
1.000 mi = 1.609 km; 1.000 km = 0.621 mi

== Louisiana Highway 3237 ==
Louisiana Highway 3237
- Location: Port Allen
- Length: 0.77 mi (1,240 m)

Louisiana Highway 3237 (LA 3237) runs 0.77 miles (1.24 km) in Port Allen.

== Louisiana Highway 3238 ==
Louisiana Highway 3238
- Location: Chalmette
- Length: 0.55 mi (890 m)
- Existed: 1980s–2014

Louisiana Highway 3238 (LA 3238) ran 0.55 miles (0.89 km) in a north–south direction along Palmisano Boulevard from LA 46 to LA 39 in Chalmette, St. Bernard Parish.

The route was a short connector between LA 46 (East St. Bernard Highway) and LA 39 (East Judge Perez Drive) that handled traffic associated with Chalmette High School. It was an undivided two-lane highway, widening to accommodate a median immediately south of LA 39. LA 3238 was transferred to local control in 2014.

The entire highway was in Chalmette, St. Bernard Parish.

mi	km	Destinations	Notes
0.000	0.000	LA 46 (East St. Bernard Highway)	Southern terminus
0.549	0.884	LA 39 (East Judge Perez Drive)	Northern terminus
1.000 mi = 1.609 km; 1.000 km = 0.621 mi

== Louisiana Highway 3239 ==
Louisiana Highway 3239
- Location: Caldwell Parish
- Length: 3.18 mi (5.12 km)
- Existed: 2019

Louisiana Highway 3239 ran 3.18 miles in a northeast–southwest direction between LA 4 and LA 126 in Caldwell Parish.

From the western terminus at LA-126, LA-3239 ran 1.7 miles East-Northeast to an intersection with Buckskin Rd, where it turned left and ran 1.48 miles Northward to its northern/eastern terminus at LA-4.

Except for a very short concurrency with a paved local road, the entire route was gravel during its time as a State highway. The route was paved in 2019 and transferred to local control, as part of LA DOTD's "right-sizing" road transfer program.

== Louisiana Highway 3241 ==
Louisiana Highway 3241
- Location: St. Tammany Parish
- Length: 5.6 mi (9.0 km)
- Existed: 2024–present

Louisiana Highway 3241 is a four-lane divided highway which at present runs 5.6 miles (9.0 km) in a north–south direction between LA 40/LA 41 at Bush and LA 435 at Talisheek in St. Tammany Parish. The route is planned to extend south to I-12/LA 434 in Lacombe.

The first segment of the route to be open, Segment 3, opened on June 14, 2024. The second segment of the route, Segment 2, runs 8.0 miles (12.9 km) between LA 435 and LA 36 near Florenville. The third segment of the route, Segment 1, runs 6.2 miles (10.0 km) southwest to I-12 and LA 434, and is currently as of 2026 under construction

The highway was planned since the 1980s, with construction beginning in 2021.

== Louisiana Highway 3242 ==
Louisiana Highway 3242
- Location: Loreauville–Dauterive Landing
- Length: 5.56 mi (8.95 km)

Louisiana Highway 3242 (LA 3242) runs 5.56 miles (8.95 km) from Loreauville to Dauterive Landing.

== Louisiana Highway 3245 ==
Louisiana Highway 3245
- Location: Baton Rouge
- Length: 2.89 mi (4.65 km)
- Existed: 1980s–2018

Louisiana Highway 3245 (LA 3245) ran 2.89 miles (4.65 km) in a north–south direction along O'Neal Lane from a local road south of I-12 to a junction with US 190 in Baton Rouge, East Baton Rouge Parish.

The route headed north on O'Neal Lane from its intersection with South Harrell's Ferry Road. After 1 mile (1.6 km), LA 3245 passed the Baton Rouge campus of Ochsner Medical Center immediately followed by a diamond interchange with I-12 at Exit 7. The highway proceeded north and intersected LA 426 (Old Hammond Highway) before reaching its terminus at US 190 (Florida Boulevard) opposite the Central Throughway. LA 3245 was an undivided four-lane highway with a center turning lane for its entire length.

The route was deleted in 2018 as part of the La DOTD's Road Transfer program.

The entire highway was in East Baton Rouge Parish.

Location	mi	km	Destinations	Notes
Baton Rouge	0.0	0.0	South Harrell's Ferry Road	Southern terminus
Baton Rouge	1.2	1.9	I-12 – Baton Rouge, Hammond	Exit 7 on I-12
	2.4	3.9	LA 426 (Old Hammond Highway)	
Baton Rouge	2.9	4.7	US 190 (Florida Boulevard)	Northern terminus
1.000 mi = 1.609 km; 1.000 km = 0.621 mi

== Louisiana Highway 3246 ==
Louisiana Highway 3246
- Location: Baton Rouge
- Length: 3.80 mi (6.12 km)
- Existed: 1980s–2023

Louisiana Highway 3246 (LA 3246) runs 3.80 miles (6.12 km) in a north–south direction along Siegen Lane from LA 42 south of Baton Rouge to the concurrent US 61 and LA 73 in Baton Rouge, East Baton Rouge Parish.

The route begins at an intersection at which LA 42 turns east from Burbank Drive onto Highland Road. LA 3246 heads north on Siegen Lane, the continuation of Burbank Drive, initially as a divided four-lane highway through a suburban residential area southeast of Baton Rouge. After intersecting LA 427 (Perkins Road), the highway crosses over the Kansas City Southern Railway (KCS) line and passes through a diamond interchange with I-10 at Exit 163. LA 3246, now a primarily commercial thoroughfare, widens to an undivided six-lane highway with a center turning lane for the remainder of its route. It proceeds northward to its terminus at US 61/LA 73 (Airline Highway) in an area on the Baton Rouge city limits known as Nesser opposite South Sherwood Forest Boulevard. In 2023, LA 3246 was removed from the state highway system and transferred to local control.

The entire highway is in East Baton Rouge Parish.

Location	mi	km	Destinations	Notes
	0.0	0.0	LA 42 (Highland Road, Burbank Drive)	Southern terminus
Village St. George	1.3	2.1	LA 427 (Perkins Road)	
	2.4	3.9	I-10 – Baton Rouge, New Orleans	Exit 163 on I-10
Baton Rouge	3.8	6.1	US 61 / LA 73 (Airline Highway)	Northern terminus; location also known as Nesser
1.000 mi = 1.609 km; 1.000 km = 0.621 mi

== Louisiana Highway 3247 ==
Louisiana Highway 3247
- Location: Tate Cove
- Length: 1.62 mi (2.61 km)
- Existed: c. 1991–present

Louisiana Highway 3247 (LA 3247) runs 1.62 miles (2.61 km) in a northwest to southeast direction along Cabot Road from LA 1171 to LA 29 northeast of Ville Platte, Evangeline Parish. The route is a former alignment of LA 29.

The entire highway is in Evangeline Parish.

Location	mi	km	Destinations	Notes
Tate Cove	0.0	0.0	LA 1171	Western terminus
	1.6	2.6	LA 29 to I-49	Eastern terminus
1.000 mi = 1.609 km; 1.000 km = 0.621 mi

== Louisiana Highway 3248 ==
Louisiana Highway 3248
- Location: Naborton
- Length: 3.66 mi (5.89 km)

Louisiana Highway 3248 (LA 3248) runs 3.66 miles (5.89 km) in Naborton.

== Louisiana Highway 3249 ==
Louisiana Highway 3249
- Location: West Monroe
- Length: 0.61 mi (980 m)
- Existed: 1980s–present

Louisiana Highway 3249 (LA 3249) runs 0.61 miles (0.98 km) in a north–south direction from the south I-20 frontage road in West Monroe, Ouachita Parish to the concurrent US 80 and LA 15 just north of the city limits.

The route consists of the state-maintained portion of Well Road running through the partial cloverleaf interchange on I-20 at Exit 112 and connecting with US 80/LA 15. LA 3249 is an undivided four-lane highway with a center turning lane north of the I-20 interchange and an undivided two-lane highway otherwise. The LA 3249 designation is not signed, and only the local name (Well Road) is used on the I-20 exit signage.

The entire highway is in Ouachita Parish.

Location	mi	km	Destinations	Notes
West Monroe	0.0	0.0	Begin state maintenance at south I-20 frontage road	Southern terminus
West Monroe	0.1– 0.4	0.16– 0.64	I-20 – Monroe, Shreveport	Exit 112 on I-20
	0.6	0.97	US 80 / LA 15 (Cypress Street)	Northern terminus
1.000 mi = 1.609 km; 1.000 km = 0.621 mi
