= List of state highways in Louisiana (3100–3149) =

The following is a list of state highways in the U.S. state of Louisiana designated in the 3100–3149 range.

== Louisiana Highway 3100 ==
Louisiana Highway 3100
- Location: Pineville
- Length: 0.925 mi (1,489 m)
- Existed: 1964–present

Louisiana Highway 3100 (LA 3100) runs 0.93 miles (1.50 km) in a general east–west direction from US 165 Bus. to the junction of US 167 and LA 28 in Pineville. The route has a spur that travels 0.64 miles (1.03 km) along Donohue Ferry Road from LA 3100 to Expressway Drive.

LA 3100 heads northeast from US 165 Bus. (Military Highway) just north of the latter's entrance to Louisiana College. It travels along Donohue Ferry Road through a residential neighborhood. After crossing over the Kansas City Southern Railway (KCS) line, LA 3100 intersects LA 3100 Spur at Griffith Street. The spur route proceeds north on Donohue Ferry Road while LA 3100 turns southeast onto Griffth Street as signs direct motorists toward LA 28. LA 3100 proceeds a short distance past Lessie Moore Elementary School to a diamond interchange with US 167 and LA 28, connecting to Alexandria, Winnfield, and Jonesville. LA 3100 is an undivided two-lane highway with a center turning lane for its entire length.

LA 3100 was added to the state highway system in 1964, creating a state-maintained connection between the new Pineville Expressway and US 165 Bus. (Military Highway) along existing roadways.

The entire highway is in Pineville, Rapides Parish.

mi	km	Destinations	Notes
0.000	0.000	US 165 Bus. (Military Highway)	Western terminus
0.654	1.053	LA 3100 Spur (Donohue Ferry Road)	Southern terminus of LA 3100 Spur (signed as LA 3100)
0.925	1.489	US 167 / LA 28 west (Pineville Expressway) – Alexandria, Winnfield LA 28 east – Jonesville	Interchange; eastern terminus
1.000 mi = 1.609 km; 1.000 km = 0.621 mi

== Louisiana Highway 3101 ==
Louisiana Highway 3101
- Location: Catahoula Parish
- Length: 3.77 mi (6.07 km)

Louisiana Highway 3101 (LA 3101) runs 3.77 miles (6.07 km) in Catahoula Parish.

== Louisiana Highway 3102 ==
Louisiana Highway 3102
- Location: Larto–Argo
- Length: 9.33 mi (15.02 km)

Louisiana Highway 3102 (LA 3102) runs 9.33 miles (15.02 km) from Larto to Argo in Catahoula Parish.

== Louisiana Highway 3103 ==
Louisiana Highway 3103
- Location: Mansfield
- Length: 0.8 mi (1,300 m)
- Existed: 1960s–2000s

Louisiana Highway 3103 (LA 3103) ran 0.8 miles (1.3 km) in an east–west direction, looping off of US 84 in Mansfield, DeSoto Parish.

The route followed a short section of US 84 bypassed in the 1960s. From the west, LA 3103 headed northeast on Kings Highway past Mansfield High School, then curved due east onto McEnery Street. After crossing the present alignment of US 84 and US 171, the route continued a short distance to the contemporary alignment at Washington Avenue, now designated as US 84 Business.

The entire highway was in Mansfield, DeSoto Parish.

mi	km	Destinations	Notes
0.0	0.0	US 84	Western terminus
0.8	1.3	US 84 / US 171 (Washington Avenue)	Eastern terminus
1.000 mi = 1.609 km; 1.000 km = 0.621 mi

== Louisiana Highway 3104 ==
Louisiana Highway 3104
- Location: Midway
- Length: 1.03 mi (1.66 km)

Louisiana Highway 3104 (LA 3104) runs 1.03 miles (1.66 km) in a north–south direction from LA 8 to the concurrent US 84/LA 772 in Midway, LaSalle Parish. It is an undivided two-lane highway for its entire length.

The entire highway is in Midway, LaSalle Parish.

Parish	mi	km	Destinations	Notes
0.00	0.00	LA 8	Southern terminus	
1.03	1.66	US 84 / LA 772	Northern terminus	
1.000 mi = 1.609 km; 1.000 km = 0.621 mi

== Louisiana Highway 3105 ==
Louisiana Highway 3105
- Location: Bossier City
- Length: 4.91 mi (7.90 km)

Louisiana Highway 3105 (LA 3105) runs 4.91 miles (7.90 km) in a north–south direction from US 71 to the end of state maintenance at a point in Bossier City in Bossier Parish.

The route starts at Barksdale Boulevard (US 71), and heads northeast on Airline Drive. It crosses the Kansas City Southern railroad tracks, curving to the north-northwest and intersecting LA 72. Shortly after, it has a diamond interchange with I-20 (unsigned on I-20). It intersects the concurrent US 79/US 80 and curves to the north shortly after, having another diamond interchange with I-220. The route ends 1.0 mile (1.6 km) later at a point in Bossier City, while Airline Drive continues north. LA 3105 is an undivided four-lane highway, except for its interchanges at I-20 and I-220 where it briefly becomes divided. The route formerly continued south of US 71 along McDade Street and ended at Arthur Ray Teague Parkway, and also continued further north to end at the northern boundary of the Bossier City city limits. Both of these segments were deleted in 2023.

The entire highway is in Bossier City, Bossier Parish.

mi	km	Destinations	Notes
0.0	0.0	US 71 (Barksdale Boulevard)	Southern terminus; route continues as McDade Street
1.2	1.9	LA 72 (Old Minden Road)	
1.5– 1.6	2.4– 2.6	I-20 – Shreveport, Monroe	Exit 22 on I-20
1.9	3.1	US 79 / US 80 (East Texas Street)	
3.8– 4.0	6.1– 6.4	I-220 – Texarkana, Monroe	Exit 12 on I-220
4.91	7.90	End state maintenance in Bossier City	Northern terminus; route continues as Airline Drive
1.000 mi = 1.609 km; 1.000 km = 0.621 mi

== Louisiana Highway 3107 ==
Louisiana Highway 3107
- Location: Thibodaux
- Length: 4.19 mi (6.74 km)
- Existed: 1960s–2016

Louisiana Highway 3107 (LA 3107) ran 4.19 miles (6.74 km) in an east–west direction along Talbot Avenue from LA 309 west of Thibodaux to LA 20 in Thibodaux, Lafourche Parish.

The route headed east from LA 309 (Brule Guillot Road) in an area known as Brule. En route to Thibodaux, it intersected LA 3185 (West Thibodaux Bypass Road). Near the end of its route it briefly crossed into Terrebonne Parish before re-entering Lafourche Parish. LA 3107 then reached its eastern terminus at LA 20 (Canal Boulevard) in Thibodaux, just north of Schriever.

LA 3107 was an undivided two-lane highway for its entire length.

Parish	Location	mi	km	Destinations	Notes
Lafourche	Brule	0.0	0.0	LA 309 (Brule Guillot Road)	Western terminus
Lafourche	Leighton	1.5	2.4	LA 3185 (West Thibodaux Bypass Road)	
Terrebonne	No major junctions				
Lafourche	Thibodaux	4.2	6.8	LA 20 (Canal Boulevard)	Eastern terminus
1.000 mi = 1.609 km; 1.000 km = 0.621 mi

== Louisiana Highway 3110 ==
Louisiana Highway 3110
- Location: Natchitoches
- Length: 5.6 mi (9.0 km)
- Existed: 1975–1980

Louisiana Highway 3110 (LA 3110) was a Louisiana state highway located in Natchitoches. The LA 3110 designation was a temporary designation used for the LA 1 bypass during construction. Once construction was completed, the LA 3110 designation was removed and LA 1 was re-rerouted onto the bypass.

The entire route was in Natchitoches, Natchitoches Parish.

mi	km	Destinations	Notes
0.0	0.0	LA 1 – Natchitoches, Alexandria	
4.0	6.4	LA 6 (University Parkway) to I-49 – Northwestern State University	
5.6	9.0	LA 1	
1.000 mi = 1.609 km; 1.000 km = 0.621 mi

== Louisiana Highway 3112 ==
Louisiana Highway 3112
- Location: Toomey
- Length: 1.64 mi (2.64 km)

Louisiana Highway 3112 (LA 3112) runs 1.64 miles in an east–west direction, from LA 109 in Vinton and ending near Toomey in western Calcasieu Parish, near the Louisiana-Texas border.

In 2017 it was proposed for deletion as part of La DOTD's Road Transfer program.

The entire highway is in Calcasieu Parish.

Location	mi	km	Destinations	Notes
	0.000	0.000	Begin state maintenance on Seward Road	Western terminus
Vinton	1.637	2.634	LA 109	Eastern terminus
1.000 mi = 1.609 km; 1.000 km = 0.621 mi

== Louisiana Highway 3113 ==
Louisiana Highway 3113
- Location: Port Hudson
- Length: 1.91 mi (3.07 km)
- Existed: 1960s–2018

Louisiana Highway 3113 (LA 3113) ran 1.91 miles (3.07 km) in an east–west direction, connecting Port Hudson National Cemetery with US 61 north of Baton Rouge, East Baton Rouge Parish. It was an undivided two-lane highway for its entire length.

The route was deleted in 2018 as part of the La DOTD's Road Transfer program.

The entire highway is in East Baton Rouge Parish.

Location	mi	km	Destinations	Notes
Port Hudson	0.0	0.0	Begin state maintenance at Port Hudson National Cemetery	Western terminus
Bonn	1.9	3.1	US 61 (Samuels Road)	Eastern terminus
1.000 mi = 1.609 km; 1.000 km = 0.621 mi

== Louisiana Highway 3114 ==
Louisiana Highway 3114
- Location: Covington
- Length: 1.70 mi (2.74 km)
- Existed: c. 1967–1971

Louisiana Highway 3114 (LA 3114) was a state highway in Louisiana that served St. Tammany Parish. It spanned a total of 1.7 miles (2.7 km) along the present route of U.S. 190 on the north side of Covington.

== Louisiana Highway 3115 ==
Louisiana Highway 3115
- Location: St. Gabriel
- Length: 2.50 mi (4.02 km)
- Existed: 1970s–present

Louisiana Highway 3115 (LA 3115) runs 2.50 miles (4.02 km) in a north–south direction from LA 75 to LA 74 in St. Gabriel, Iberville Parish.

The route heads northeast from LA 75, which follows the east bank levee of the Mississippi River, and passes a series of industrial facilities in an otherwise rural area within the St. Gabriel city limits. After intersecting LA 30, the highway reaches its terminus at LA 74. Both routes connect St. Gabriel with the nearby I-10 and US 61 corridors. LA 3115 is an undivided two-lane highway for its entire length.

The entire highway is in St. Gabriel, Iberville Parish.

mi	km	Destinations	Notes
0.0	0.0	LA 75 (Point Clair Road)	Southern terminus
1.7	2.7	LA 30 – St. Gabriel, Gonzales	
2.5	4.0	LA 74 – St. Gabriel, Dutchtown	Northern terminus
1.000 mi = 1.609 km; 1.000 km = 0.621 mi

== Louisiana Highway 3116 ==
Louisiana Highway 3116
- Location: Eunice
- Length: 2.39 mi (3.85 km)

Louisiana Highway 3116 (LA 3116) runs 2.39 miles (3.85 km) in Eunice. It runs from LA 13 in the Acadia Parish part of Eunice to LA 91 in the St. Landry Parish part of Eunice.

== Louisiana Highway 3118 ==
Louisiana Highway 3118
- Location: Fort Jesup
- Length: 1.26 mi (2.03 km)

Louisiana Highway 3118 (LA 3118) runs 1.26 miles (2.03 km) in Fort Jesup, Sabine Parish.

== Louisiana Highway 3120 ==
Louisiana Highway 3120
- Location: Donaldsonville
- Length: 1.02 mi (1.64 km)
- Existed: c. 1975–present

Louisiana Highway 3120 (LA 3120) runs 1.02 miles (1.64 km) in a northwest to southeast direction from LA 18 to LA 70 east of Donaldsonville, Ascension Parish.

The route is a short connector, originally constructed around 1964 as part of LA 3089. It was the main route connecting Donaldsonville with the Sunshine Bridge across the Mississippi River until LA 3089 was re-routed and extended directly into town in the mid-1970s. LA 3120 is an undivided two-lane highway for its entire length.

The entire route is in Ascension Parish.

mi	km	Destinations	Notes
0.0	0.0	LA 18	Western terminus
1.0	1.6	LA 70 – Donaldsonville, Sunshine Bridge	Eastern terminus
1.000 mi = 1.609 km; 1.000 km = 0.621 mi

== Louisiana Highway 3121 ==
Louisiana Highway 3121
- Location: Spearsville–Lockhart
- Length: 6.064 mi (9.759 km)
- Existed: 1970s–present

Louisiana Highway 3121 (LA 3121) runs 6.06 miles (9.75 km) in a north–south direction from the LA 15 in Spearsville to LA 558 at Lockhart. The route has a spur that travels 0.07 miles (0.11 km) from LA 3121 to a dead end at the village's abandoned school property. A second spur was renumbered as LA 3269 in the early 1990s.

The entire highway is in Union Parish.

Location	mi	km	Destinations	Notes
Spearsville	0.000	0.000	LA 15 – Lillie, Farmerville	Southern terminus
Spearsville	0.014	0.023	LA 3121 Spur	Western terminus of LA 3121 Spur
Lockhart	6.064	9.759	LA 558	Northern terminus
1.000 mi = 1.609 km; 1.000 km = 0.621 mi

== Louisiana Highway 3123 ==
Louisiana Highway 3123
- Location: Eunice
- Length: 1.89 mi (3.04 km)
- Existed: 1970s–present

Louisiana Highway 3123 (LA 3123) is a two-lane state highway that travels just south of the city limits of Eunice in Acadia Parish. It is 1.9 miles (3.1 km) long, carries the name Tiger Lane, and is two lanes wide for its entire length. It begins at LA 755 in front of the Louisiana State University at Eunice campus. The highway heads to the southeast passing the entrance to Eunice Airport then passing some homes before curving to the east. Near its end, LA 3123 intersects LA 3116, crosses a railroad at-grade, and ends at LA 13.

== Louisiana Highway 3124 ==
Louisiana Highway 3124
- Location: Bogalusa
- Length: 3.63 mi (5.84 km)

Louisiana Highway 3124 (LA 3124) runs 3.63 miles (5.84 km) in Bogalusa, Washington Parish.

== Louisiana Highway 3125 ==
Louisiana Highway 3125
- Location: St. James Parish
- Length: 13.78 mi (22.18 km)
- Existed: 1970s–present

Louisiana Highway 3125 (LA 3125) runs 13.78 miles (22.18 km) in an east–west direction from LA 70 south of Sorrento to the junction of LA 641 and LA 3213 east of Gramercy.

The route spans the distance between the approaches to two bridges across the Mississippi River, the Sunshine Bridge on LA 70 and the Gramercy Bridge on LA 3213. It is a two-lane highway that provides a bypass of the older and winding River Road (LA 44), facilitating truck traffic through the industrial corridor along the river. Along the way, LA 3125 cuts across a sharp bend in the river at Convent. Near the end of its route, it passes through the adjacent unincorporated communities of Lutcher and Gramercy, terminating just south of a junction with US 61 (Airline Highway).

The entire highway is in St. James Parish.

Location	mi	km	Destinations	Notes
	0.0	0.0	LA 70 – Sorrento, Donaldsonville	Western terminus; to Sunshine Bridge
	5.0	8.0	LA 3214 – Convent	Eastern terminus of LA 3214
	9.4	15.1	LA 642	
Lutcher	12.1	19.5	LA 3193 (Lutcher Avenue)	Northern terminus of LA 3193
Gramercy	12.6	20.3	LA 3274 (North Airline Avenue)	
Gramercy	13.6	21.9	LA 641 south	Western end of LA 641 concurrency
	13.8	22.2	LA 641 north / LA 3213 south – Gramercy Bridge	Eastern terminus of LA 3125; eastern end of LA 641 concurrency; northern terminus of LA 3213
1.000 mi = 1.609 km; 1.000 km = 0.621 mi: Concurrency terminus

== Louisiana Highway 3127 ==
Louisiana Highway 3127
- Location: Boutte–Donaldsonville
- Length: 42.1 mi (67.8 km)
- Existed: 1970s–present

Louisiana Highway 3127 (LA 3127) is a state highway in Louisiana that serves Ascension, St. James, St. John the Baptist, and St. Charles Parishes.

== Louisiana Highway 3128 ==
Louisiana Highway 3128
- Location: Kolin–Libuse
- Length: 4.17 mi (6.71 km)

Louisiana Highway 3128 (LA 3128) runs 4.17 miles (6.71 km) from Kolin to Libuse.

== Louisiana Highway 3130 ==
Louisiana Highway 3130
- Location: Nugent
- Length: 1.54 mi (2.48 km)

Louisiana Highway 3130 (LA 3130) runs 1.54 miles (2.48 km) in Nugent.

== Louisiana Highway 3131 ==
Louisiana Highway 3131
- Location: New Roads
- Length: 1.79 mi (2.88 km)
- Existed: 1970s–2011

Louisiana Highway 3131 (LA 3131) ran 1.79 miles (2.88 km) in a north–south direction along Hospital Road in New Roads, Pointe Coupee Parish, connecting to LA 1 at either end.

The route served as a bypass of the downtown area and developed as a modern commercial corridor for the small city. Its local name, Hospital Road, reflects the presence of the Pointe Coupee General Hospital at its southern terminus. The construction of the nearby John James Audubon Bridge over the Mississippi River led to a reconfiguration of highway routes in the area. LA 3131 became part of mainline LA 1 with the old route through town designated as LA 1 Business.

The entire highway was in New Roads, Pointe Coupee Parish.

mi	km	Destinations	Notes
0.0	0.0	LA 1 (False River Drive)	Southern terminus
1.8	2.9	LA 1 / LA 10 – Marksville	Northern terminus
1.000 mi = 1.609 km; 1.000 km = 0.621 mi

== Louisiana Highway 3132 ==
Louisiana Highway 3132
- Location: Shreveport
- Length: 10.21 mi (16.43 km)
- Existed: c. 1979–present

Louisiana Highway 3132 (LA 3132) is a freeway located in Shreveport, Louisiana. It runs 10.25 miles (16.50 km) in a general east–west direction from the junction of Interstates 20 and 220 to LA 523, serving as a southwestern bypass of the downtown area. With I-220, the highway helps to carry through traffic between the two disconnected portions of Interstate 49 (I-49), the area's main north–south route.

== Louisiana Highway 3134 ==
Louisiana Highway 3134
- Location: Jefferson Parish
- Length: 6.92 mi (11.14 km)
- Existed: c. 1976–present

Louisiana Highway 3134 (LA 3134) is a state highway in Louisiana that serves Jefferson Parish. It spans 7.2 miles (11.6 km) in a north-south direction along Leo Kerner/Lafitte Parkway between Jean Lafitte and Estelle (south of Marrero) and acts as a four-lane bypass to the older Barataria Boulevard (LA 45).

== Louisiana Highway 3136 ==
Louisiana Highway 3136
- Location: Atlanta
- Length: 0.72 mi (1,160 m)
- Existed: 1970s–present

Louisiana Highway 3136 (LA 3136) runs 0.72 miles (1.16 km) in a general north–south direction (signed east–west) from Parish Road 817 to LA 34 in Atlanta, Winn Parish. It is an undivided two-lane highway for its entire length.

The entire highway is in Winn Parish.

Location	mi	km	Destinations	Notes
Atlanta	0.0	0.0	PR 817 (Packton–Alexandria Road)	Southern terminus
	0.7	1.1	LA 34 (Main Street)	Northern terminus
1.000 mi = 1.609 km; 1.000 km = 0.621 mi

== Louisiana Highway 3137 ==
Louisiana Highway 3137
- Location: Plaquemines Parish
- Length: 3.44 mi (5.54 km)
- Existed: c. 1968–present

Louisiana Highway 3137 (LA 3137) runs 3.44 miles (5.54 km) in a general north–south direction along English Turn Road, looping off of LA 39 opposite the Mississippi River from Belle Chasse, Plaquemines Parish. It was the original route of LA 39 before the present cut-off opened around 1968. LA 3137 is an undivided two-lane highway for its entire length.

The entire highway is in Plaquemines Parish.

Location	mi	km	Destinations	Notes
Scarsdale	0.0	0.0	LA 39	Southern terminus; at Belle Chasse–Scarsdale Ferry
Braithwaite	3.4	5.5	LA 39	Northern terminus
1.000 mi = 1.609 km; 1.000 km = 0.621 mi

== Louisiana Highway 3139 ==
Louisiana Highway 3139
- Location: New Orleans–Harahan
- Length: 5.10 mi (8.21 km)
- Existed: c. 1971–present

Louisiana Highway 3139 (LA 3139) is a state highway located in both Jefferson Parish and Orleans Parish, Louisiana. It spans a total of 5.2 miles (8.4 km). Although it is an odd-numbered highway and is bannered north/south, it travels in a more east-to-west direction.

== Louisiana Highway 3140 ==
Louisiana Highway 3140
- Location: Ascension Parish
- Length: 0.91 mi (1,460 m)
- Existed: 1970s–present

Louisiana Highway 3140 (LA 3140) runs 0.91 miles (1.46 km) in an east–west direction off of US 61 (Airline Highway) southeast of Sorrento, Ascension Parish. The route is located just north of exit 187 on I-10 and provides access to several petroleum industry facilities. It is an undivided two-lane highway for its entire length.

The entire route is in Ascension Parish.

mi	km	Destinations	Notes
0.0	0.0	US 61 (Airline Highway)	Western terminus
0.9	1.4	End state maintenance at private access road	Eastern terminus
1.000 mi = 1.609 km; 1.000 km = 0.621 mi

== Louisiana Highway 3141 ==
Louisiana Highway 3141
- Location: Killona
- Length: 1.27 mi (2.04 km)
- Existed: c. 1975–present

Louisiana Highway 3141 (LA 3141) runs 1.27 miles (2.04 km) in a southwest to northeast direction along Mary Plantation Road from LA 3127 to LA 18 (River Road) in Killona, St. Charles Parish. The route connects Killona with LA 3127, a highway constructed in the 1970s that bypasses the various communities along the west bank of the Mississippi River between Luling and Donaldsonville. It is an undivided two-lane highway for its entire length.

The entire highway is in St. Charles Parish.

Location	mi	km	Destinations	Notes
	0.0	0.0	LA 3127	Western terminus
Killona	1.3	2.1	LA 18 (River Road)	Eastern terminus
1.000 mi = 1.609 km; 1.000 km = 0.621 mi

== Louisiana Highway 3142 ==
Louisiana Highway 3142
- Location: Taft
- Length: 1.56 mi (2.51 km)
- Existed: c. 1975–present

Louisiana Highway 3142 (LA 3142) runs 1.56 miles (2.51 km) in a southwest to northeast direction from LA 3127 to LA 18 (River Road) in Taft, St. Charles Parish.

The route connects the industrial area of Taft with LA 3127, a highway constructed in the 1970s that bypasses the various communities along the west bank of the Mississippi River between Luling and Donaldsonville. The Dow Chemical Company and Waterford 3 nuclear power plant are among the facilities served by the highway. LA 3142 crosses the Union Pacific Railroad (UP) tracks by way of an overpass. It is an undivided two-lane highway for its entire length.

The entire highway is in St. Charles Parish.

Location	mi	km	Destinations	Notes
	0.0	0.0	LA 3127	Western terminus
Taft	1.6	2.6	LA 18 (River Road)	Eastern terminus
1.000 mi = 1.609 km; 1.000 km = 0.621 mi

== Louisiana Highway 3143 ==
Louisiana Highway 3143
- Location: Vermilion Parish
- Length: 3.12 mi (5.02 km)

Louisiana Highway 3143 (LA 3143) runs 3.12 miles (5.02 km) in Vermilion Parish.

== Louisiana Highway 3144 ==
Louisiana Highway 3144
- Location: Pineville
- Length: 1.93 mi (3.11 km)
- Existed: 1970s–present

Louisiana Highway 3144 (LA 3144) runs 1.93 miles (3.11 km) in a general north–south direction along Edgewood Drive from US 165 Business to LA 28 in Pineville, Rapides Parish.

The route heads north from LA 28 and passes through a wooded area of mixed residential and commercial establishments. After curving due west, LA 3144 passes through a diamond interchange with US 167 (Pineville Expressway). It proceeds a short distance further to its terminus at US 165 Business (Military Highway). LA 3144 is an undivided two-lane highway for its entire length.

The entire highway is in Pineville, Rapides Parish.

mi	km	Destinations	Notes
0.0	0.0	LA 28	Southern terminus
1.8	2.9	US 167 (Pineville Expressway)	
1.9	3.1	US 165 Bus. (Military Highway)	Northern terminus
1.000 mi = 1.609 km; 1.000 km = 0.621 mi

== Louisiana Highway 3146 ==
Louisiana Highway 3146
- Location: Violet
- Length: 0.56 mi (900 m)
- Existed: c. 1975–1980s

Louisiana Highway 3146 (LA 3146) ran 0.56 miles (0.90 km) in an east–west direction along Colonial Boulevard from LA 46 (East St. Bernard Highway) to LA 39 (East Judge Perez Drive) in Violet, St. Bernard Parish. It was a temporary connector between the original and current routes of LA 39 in the 1970s and 1980s.

In 1975, LA 39 was re-routed onto a newly opened extension of Judge Perez Drive from LA 47 (Paris Road) in Chalmette to a dead end at the Violet Canal, pending construction of a further extension from Violet to Poydras. During this time, traffic was routed onto Colonial Boulevard to connect the end of the new LA 39 (East Judge Perez Drive) with the existing LA 39 (East St. Bernard Highway, now LA 46). The Violet Canal bridge and extension of Judge Perez Drive to Poydras was opened in 1981, and LA 3146 was deleted sometime afterward.

The entire highway was in Violet, St. Bernard Parish.

mi	km	Destinations	Notes
0.00	0.00	LA 46 (East St. Bernard Highway)	Western terminus
0.56	0.90	LA 39 (East Judge Perez Drive)	Eastern terminus
1.000 mi = 1.609 km; 1.000 km = 0.621 mi

== Louisiana Highway 3147 ==
Louisiana Highway 3147
- Location: Vermilion Parish
- Length: 9.99 mi (16.08 km)

Louisiana Highway 3147 (LA 3147) runs 9.99 miles (16.08 km) in Vermilion Parish.

== Louisiana Highway 3148 ==
Louisiana Highway 3148
- Location: Elam
- Length: 3.25 mi (5.23 km)

Louisiana Highway 3148 (LA 3148) runs 3.25 miles (5.23 km) in Elam, Franklin Parish.

== Louisiana Highway 3149 ==
Louisiana Highway 3149
- Location: Mamou–Reddell
- Length: 3.62 mi (5.83 km)

Louisiana Highway 3149 (LA 3149) runs 3.62 miles (5.83 km) from Mamou to Reddell in Evangeline Parish.
