= Louisiana Highway 641 =

State highway in Louisiana, United States

Louisiana Highway 641

Route information
- Maintained by Louisiana DOTD
- Length: 6.9 mi (11.1 km)

Major junctions
- South end: LA 44 in Lutcher
- North end: I-10 North of Gramercy

Location
- Country: United States
- State: Louisiana
- Parishes: St. James

Highway system
- Louisiana State Highway System; Interstate; US; State; Scenic
| ← LA 640 | → LA 642 |

Louisiana Highway 641 (LA 641) is a state highway in Louisiana that serves St. James Parish. It travels 6.9 miles (11.1 km) in the shape of a capital J, starting northwest, veering northeast, and then turning north, serving the communities of Lutcher and Gramercy and providing a connection to Interstate 10 (I-10) for those towns.

== Route description ==
LA 641 starts at LA 44 (Jefferson Highway) in Lutcher and traverses north on Albert Street. It then crosses the Illinois Central Railroad and goes eastward on West Main Street. LA 641 intersects Lutcher Avenue (LA 3193) and North Airline Avenue (LA 3274, which was formerly LA 20). East of North Airline, the street is called East Main Street. Past Golden Grove Road, LA 641 resumes a north–south routing to meet LA 3125 near the Kansas City Southern Railway. The two highways are concurrent for 0.2 miles (0.32 km) until LA 3125 ends at a junction with LA 3213. From that ending, LA 641, traverses north, crossing the Kansas City Southern Railway and Airline Highway (U.S. Route 61) and traverses north through the Maurepas Swamp. LA 641 ends at I-10 where it crosses the highway at milepost 194.

LA 641 traverses a residential-commercial mix area in Lutcher and Gramercy, followed by an industrial area north of Gramercy. North of Airline Highway, the road traverses a secluded wetland before intersecting I-10. With the exception of the area immediately north and south of its intersection with Airline Highway, LA-641 is an undivided two-lane route in its entirety. It is a divided two-lane route in its short concurrency with LA 3125 and a four-lane road between LA 3213 and Airline Highway.

== History ==
LA 641 was originally conceived as a local route to serve Gramercy and Lutcher. The road traversed the two communities, serving local traffic, while LA 44 served through traffic among River Road communities. The southern part of the highway remains in its same 1955-era routing, using Albert Street and Main Street; however, the route originally returned to LA-44 by crossing the Illinois Central Railroad just east of LA 20 (present day LA 3274). In 1981, LA 641 was rerouted to its present routing north of Gramercy to connect to I-10. With the completion of the Gramercy Bridge (or Veterans Memorial Bridge) across the Mississippi River between Gramercy and Wallace, the new state highway (LA 3213) intersected with LA 641 just south of the Kansas City Southern Railway. The northern part of the road, albeit the most rural, serves as a connector route to industrial interests along Airline Highway and River Road in St. James and St. John parishes, the Gramercy Bridge, and plantation sightseeing on both sides of the Mississippi River.

== Major junctions ==
The entire highway is in St. James Parish.

| Location | mi | km | Destinations | Notes |
|---|---|---|---|---|
| Lutcher | 0.0 | 0.0 | LA 44 (Jefferson Highway) | |
| Lutcher | 0.5 | 0.80 | LA 3193 (Lutcher Avenue) | |
| Gramercy | 1.0 | 1.6 | LA 3274 (Airline Avenue) | |
| Gramercy | 2.8 | 4.5 | LA 3125 north | Southern end of LA 3125 concurrency |
| | 3.0 | 4.8 | LA 3213 south / LA 3225 ends – Gramercy Bridge | Northern terminus of LA 3213; northern end of LA 3125 concurrency |
| | 3.2 | 5.1 | US 61 (Airline Highway) – New Orleans, Baton Rouge | |
| | 6.4– 6.9 | 10.3– 11.1 | I-10 – New Orleans, Baton Rouge | Exit 194 (I-10) |
1.000 mi = 1.609 km; 1.000 km = 0.621 mi: Concurrency terminus
