= List of state highways in Louisiana (3250–3299) =

The following is a list of state highways in the U.S. state of Louisiana designated in the 3250–3299 range.

== Louisiana Highway 3250 ==
Louisiana Highway 3250
- Location: Alexandria
- Length: 0.500 mi (805 m)
- Existed: c. 1996–present

Louisiana Highway 3250 (LA 3250) runs 0.50 miles (0.80 km) in a southwest to northeast direction along Sugar House Road from the concurrent US 71/US 167 Bus. to LA 1208-4 in Alexandria.

The route is a short connector that has a half diamond interchange with I-49 at exit 81. It allows two-way access between I-49 and US 71 north of the actual interchange between them, where those movements are not permitted. LA 3250 is signed east–west and is generally an undivided four-lane highway.

The entire highway is in Alexandria, Rapides Parish.

mi	km	Destinations	Notes
0.000– 0.013	0.000– 0.021	US 71 / US 167 Bus. (MacArthur Drive) To I-49 south / US 167 south – Opelousas	Western terminus
0.262– 0.400	0.422– 0.644	I-49 / US 71 Byp. / US 167 north – Shreveport	Exit 81 on I-49; US 71 Byp. not signed on LA 3250
0.500	0.805	LA 1208-4 (Eddie Williams Avenue)	Eastern terminus; signed as LA 1208-1
1.000 mi = 1.609 km; 1.000 km = 0.621 mi: Incomplete access

== Louisiana Highway 3251 ==
Louisiana Highway 3251
- Location: Ascension Parish
- Length: 3.767 mi (6.062 km)
- Existed: 1990s–present

Louisiana Highway 3251 (LA 3251) runs 3.77 miles (6.07 km) in a southwest to northeast direction along Ashland Road from LA 75 to LA 30 west of Gonzales.

The route connects an industrial area situated near the Mississippi River with LA 30 about one mile (1.6 km) west of an interchange with I-10 (exit 177). LA 3251 is an undivided two-lane highway for its entire length.

The entire route is in Ascension Parish.

mi	km	Destinations	Notes
0.000	0.000	LA 75 – Geismar, Darrow	Southern terminus
3.767	6.062	LA 30 – Gonzales, St. Gabriel	Northern terminus
1.000 mi = 1.609 km; 1.000 km = 0.621 mi

== Louisiana Highway 3252 ==
Louisiana Highway 3252
- Location: Tensas Parish
- Length: 6.686 mi (10.760 km)
- Existed: 1990s–present

Louisiana Highway 3252 (LA 3252) runs 6.69 miles (10.77 km) in a general east–west direction from LA 573 north of Holly Ridge to LA 892 at Mayflower.

The entire highway is in Tensas Parish.

Location	mi	km	Destinations	Notes
	0.000	0.000	LA 573	Western terminus
Mayflower	6.686	10.760	LA 892	Eastern terminus
1.000 mi = 1.609 km; 1.000 km = 0.621 mi

== Louisiana Highway 3253 ==
Louisiana Highway 3253
- Location: Opelousas
- Length: 0.799 mi (1,286 m)
- Existed: c. 1993–present

Louisiana Highway 3253 (LA 3253) runs 0.80 miles (1.29 km) in a southeast to northwest direction from the I-49/US 167 service road to a junction with US 190 in Opelousas.

The route is a remnant of the original alignment of LA 31, which was relocated when US 167 was upgraded to a controlled-access highway as part of the construction of I-49 during the 1980s. LA 3253 is an undivided two-lane highway for its entire length.

The entire highway is in Opelousas, St. Landry Parish.

mi	km	Destinations	Notes
0.000	0.000	I-49/US 167 Service Road	Southern terminus
0.725– 0.799	1.167– 1.286	US 190 (East Vine Street, East Landry Street)	Northern terminus; one-way pair
1.000 mi = 1.609 km; 1.000 km = 0.621 mi

== Louisiana Highway 3254 ==
Louisiana Highway 3254
- Location: Leonville
- Length: 0.715 mi (1,151 m)
- Existed: 1990s–present

Louisiana Highway 3254 (LA 3254) runs 0.72 miles (1.16 km) in an east–west direction along Oscar Rivette Street from the junction of LA 31 and LA 347 in Leonville to a local road at the eastern corporate limits. The route's mileposts increase from the eastern end contrary to common practice. LA 3254 is an undivided two-lane highway for its entire length.

The entire highway is in Leonville, St. Landry Parish.

mi	km	Destinations	Notes
0.715	1.151	LA 31 / LA 347 – Arnaudville, Opelousas	Western terminus of LA 3254; northern terminus of LA 347
0.000	0.000	End state maintenance at junction of Oscar Rivette Street and Garland Road	Eastern terminus
1.000 mi = 1.609 km; 1.000 km = 0.621 mi

== Louisiana Highway 3255 ==
Louisiana Highway 3255
- Location: East Feliciana Parish
- Length: 1.995 mi (3.211 km)
- Existed: c. 1993–present

Louisiana Highway 3255 (LA 3255) runs 2.00 miles (3.22 km) in a general north–south direction from the junction of two local roads southwest of Felixville to a junction with LA 432 at Felixville.

The entire highway is in East Feliciana Parish.

Location	mi	km	Destinations	Notes
	0.000	0.000	Begin state maintenance at junction of Highway 961 and Peterson Road	Southern terminus
Felixville	1.995	3.211	LA 432	Northern terminus
1.000 mi = 1.609 km; 1.000 km = 0.621 mi

== Louisiana Highway 3256 ==
Louisiana Highway 3256
- Location: Calcasieu Parish
- Length: 3.069 mi (4.939 km)
- Existed: c. 1993–present

Louisiana Highway 3256 (LA 3256) runs 3.07 miles (4.94 km) in a general east–west direction from US 90 to the I-10 service road east of Lake Charles.

The entire route is in Calcasieu Parish.

mi	km	Destinations	Notes
0.000	0.000	US 90 – Lake Charles, Iowa	Western terminus
3.069	4.939	I-10 Service Road	Eastern terminus
1.000 mi = 1.609 km; 1.000 km = 0.621 mi

== Louisiana Highway 3257 ==
Louisiana Highway 3257
- Location: Jefferson Parish
- Length: 5.790 mi (9.318 km)
- Existed: c. 1993–present

Louisiana Highway 3257 (LA 3257) runs 5.79 miles (9.32 km) in a north–south direction along Privateer Boulevard through the community of Barataria between Bayou Rigolettes and Bayou Villars.

The route follows the west bank of Bayou Barataria and is only connected to another through route by a swing bridge spanning the bayou on LA 302 (Fisherman Boulevard, formerly Kerner Street). LA 3257 is an undivided two-lane highway for its entire length.

The entire highway is in Jefferson Parish.

Location	mi	km	Destinations	Notes
	0.000	0.000	Dead end at Bayou Rigolettes	Southern terminus
Barataria	5.080	8.175	LA 302 (Fisherman Boulevard)	Western terminus of LA 302
	5.790	9.318	Dead end at Bayou Villars	Northern terminus
1.000 mi = 1.609 km; 1.000 km = 0.621 mi

== Louisiana Highway 3258 ==
Louisiana Highway 3258
- Location: Iowa
- Length: 3.756 mi (6.045 km)
- Existed: c. 1993–present

Louisiana Highway 3258 (LA 3258) runs 3.76 miles (6.05 km) in an east–west direction from the I-10 service road west of Iowa, Calcasieu Parish to a second junction with the service road west of Lacassine, Jefferson Davis Parish.

Parish	Location	mi	km	Destinations	Notes
Calcasieu		0.000	0.000	I-10 Service Road	Western terminus
Calcasieu	Iowa	1.036	1.667	LA 383 (North Thomson Street) to I-10	
Jefferson Davis		2.624– 2.648	4.223– 4.262	US 165 – Lake Charles, Kinder	
Jefferson Davis		3.756	6.045	I-10 Service Road	Eastern terminus
1.000 mi = 1.609 km; 1.000 km = 0.621 mi

== Louisiana Highway 3259 ==
Louisiana Highway 3259
- Location: Urania
- Length: 0.961 mi (1,547 m)
- Existed: c. 1993–present

Louisiana Highway 3259 (LA 3259) runs 0.96 miles (1.54 km) in a northwest to southeast direction along East Hardtner Drive from LA 125 to US 165 in Urania.

The route connects the small town of Urania with the current four-lane alignment of US 165, which bypassed the original two-lane alignment through town now followed by LA 125. LA 3259 is an undivided two-lane highway for its entire route and was previously designated as LA 125 Spur.

The entire highway is in Urania, LaSalle Parish.

mi	km	Destinations	Notes
0.000	0.000	LA 125 (East Hardtner Drive, South Pine Street)	Western terminus
0.943– 0.961	1.518– 1.547	US 165 – Alexandria, Monroe	Eastern terminus
1.000 mi = 1.609 km; 1.000 km = 0.621 mi

== Louisiana Highway 3260 ==
Louisiana Highway 3260
- Location: Hammond
- Length: 0.778 mi (1,252 m)
- Existed: c. 1993–2018

Louisiana Highway 3260 (LA 3260) ran 0.78 miles (1.26 km) in an east–west direction along West Church Street from US 190 to US 51 in Hammond.

LA 3260 continued the trajectory of US 190 as the latter makes a slight S-curve heading east toward downtown Hammond. The route provided a more direct connection between southbound US 51 and westbound US 190 to I-55 than their actual junction located 0.3 miles (0.48 km) to the south. LA 3260 was an undivided two-lane highway for its entire length.

For a time in the 1950s, LA 3260 was designated on departmental maps as LA 190, a rare duplication between a U.S. and state route number after the 1955 Louisiana Highway renumbering.

LA 3260 was deleted in 2018 as part of the La DOTD's Road Transfer program.

The entire highway was in Hammond, Tangipahoa Parish.

mi	km	Destinations	Notes
0.000– 0.096	0.000– 0.154	US 190 (West Thomas Street) to I-55	Western terminus
0.778	1.252	US 51 (North Morrison Boulevard) to I-55	Eastern terminus
1.000 mi = 1.609 km; 1.000 km = 0.621 mi

== Louisiana Highway 3261 ==
Louisiana Highway 3261
- Location: Metairie
- Length: 0.3 mi (480 m)
- Existed: c. 1993–2010

Louisiana Highway 3261 (LA 3261) ran 0.3 miles (0.48 km) in a north–south direction along Shrewsbury Road from Lausat Street to the junction of US 61 (Airline Drive) and LA 611-9 (Severn Avenue) in Metairie. It was an undivided two-lane highway for its entire length.

The route was formerly part of LA 611-3, which originally included the entirety of Shrewsbury Road, including a grade crossing with the Illinois Central Railroad line (now the Canadian National Railway). The crossing was closed to traffic in June 1957 following the completion of the parallel Causeway Boulevard (LA 3046) overpass. Later, the construction of Earhart Expressway (LA 3139) through the area created a second barrier. In the early 1990s, La DOTD renumbered several highways whose routes had become discontinuous. The northern portion of Shrewsbury Road thus became LA 3261 until being transferred to local control in 2010.

The entire highway was in Metairie, Jefferson Parish.

mi	km	Destinations	Notes
0.0	0.0	Begin state maintenance at intersection of Shrewsbury Road and Lausat Street	Southern terminus
0.3	0.48	US 61 (Airline Drive); LA 611-9 (Severn Avenue)	Northern terminus of LA 3261; western terminus of LA 611-9
1.000 mi = 1.609 km; 1.000 km = 0.621 mi

== Louisiana Highway 3262 ==
Louisiana Highway 3262
- Location: Metairie
- Length: 0.6 mi (970 m)
- Existed: c. 1993–2010

Louisiana Highway 3262 (LA 3262) ran 0.6 miles (0.97 km) in a north–south direction from a dead end to a junction with LA 611-9 in Metairie.

The route began on the north side of LA 3139 (Earhart Expressway) and headed north on Labarre Road across US 61 (Airline Drive) to its terminus at LA 611-9 (Metairie Road) in a neighborhood known as Old Metairie. LA 3262 was an undivided two-lane highway for its entire length.

LA 3262 was formerly part of LA 611-4, which originally included the entirety of Labarre Road, including a grade crossing with the Illinois Central Railroad line (now the Canadian National Railway). The crossing was closed to traffic in June 1957 following the completion of the parallel Causeway Boulevard (LA 3046) overpass. Later, the construction of Earhart Expressway (LA 3139) through the area created a second barrier. In the early 1990s, La DOTD renumbered several highways whose routes had become discontinuous. The northern portion of Labarre Road thus became LA 3262 until being transferred to local control in 2010.

The entire highway was in Metairie, Jefferson Parish.

mi	km	Destinations	Notes
0.0	0.0	Dead end at LA 3139 (Earhart Expressway) right-of-way	Southern terminus
0.1	0.16	LA 3046 Spur (Lausat Street)	Eastern terminus of LA 3046 Spur
0.3	0.48	US 61 (Airline Drive)	
0.6	0.97	LA 611-9 (Metairie Road)	Northern terminus
1.000 mi = 1.609 km; 1.000 km = 0.621 mi

== Louisiana Highway 3263 ==
Louisiana Highway 3263
- Location: Rapides Parish
- Length: 0.58 mi (930 m)
- Existed: 1990s–1990s

Louisiana Highway 3263 (LA 3263) ran 0.58 miles (0.93 km) in a north–south direction along Pinegrove Drive from LA 107 to LA 28 east of Pineville.

The entire route was in Rapides Parish.

mi	km	Destinations	Notes
0.00	0.00	LA 107 – Pineville, Marksville	Southern terminus
0.58	0.93	LA 28 – Pineville, Jonesville	Northern terminus
1.000 mi = 1.609 km; 1.000 km = 0.621 mi

== Louisiana Highway 3264 ==
Louisiana Highway 3264
- Location: Catahoula Parish
- Length: 0.709 mi (1,141 m)
- Existed: 1990s–present

Louisiana Highway 3264 (LA 3264) runs 0.71 miles (1.14 km) in an east–west direction along Trinity Road from LA 124 to a local road north of Jonesville.

The entire highway is in Catahoula Parish.

Location	mi	km	Destinations	Notes
	0.000	0.000	LA 124 – Jonesville, Harrisonburg	Western terminus
Trinity	0.709	1.141	End state maintenance on Trinity Road	Eastern terminus
1.000 mi = 1.609 km; 1.000 km = 0.621 mi

== Louisiana Highway 3265 ==
Louisiana Highway 3265
- Location: Woodworth
- Length: 2.930 mi (4.715 km)
- Existed: c. 1992–present

Louisiana Highway 3265 (LA 3265) runs 2.93 miles (4.72 km) in an east–west direction along Robinson Bridge Road from US 165 to a point east of I-49 in Woodworth.

The route connects the town of Woodworth, situated along US 165 south of Alexandria, with I-49 (exit 73). It is an undivided two-lane highway for most of its length.

The entire highway is in Woodworth, Rapides Parish.

mi	km	Destinations	Notes
0.000	0.000	US 165 – Alexandria, Lake Charles	Western terminus
2.565– 2.747	4.128– 4.421	I-49 – Alexandria, Opelousas	Exit 73 on I-49
2.930	4.715	PR 22 west (Robinson Bridge Road)	Eastern terminus
1.000 mi = 1.609 km; 1.000 km = 0.621 mi

== Louisiana Highway 3266 ==
Louisiana Highway 3266
- Location: Lafourche Parish
- Length: 1.296 mi (2.086 km)
- Existed: 1990s–present

Louisiana Highway 3266 (LA 3266) runs 1.30 miles (2.09 km) in a north–south direction from LA 308 to a local road northwest of Thibodaux.

The route begins at a point on LA 308 just north and west of the Thibodaux city limits opposite a bridge across Bayou Lafourche that connects with LA 1. LA 3266 heads north as an undivided two-lane highway until reaching its terminus at Forty Arpent Road.

The entire route is in Lafourche Parish.

mi	km	Destinations	Notes
0.000	0.000	LA 308 (Bayou Road)	Southern terminus
1.296	2.086	End state maintenance at Forty Arpent Road	Northern terminus
1.000 mi = 1.609 km; 1.000 km = 0.621 mi

== Louisiana Highway 3267 ==
Louisiana Highway 3267
- Location: Abbeville
- Length: 3.794 mi (6.106 km)
- Existed: 1990s–present

Louisiana Highway 3267 (LA 3267) runs 3.79 miles (6.10 km) in a general southwest to northeast direction from LA 82 south of Abbeville to LA 14 in Abbeville.

The route serves as part of the LA 82 truck route around the center of Abbeville. It is an undivided two-lane highway for its entire length.

The entire highway is in Vermilion Parish.

Location	mi	km	Destinations	Notes
	0.000	0.000	LA 82 – Abbeville, Perry LA 82 Truck begins	Western terminus of LA 3267; southern terminus of LA 82 Truck; west end of LA 82 Truck concurrency
Abbeville	3.794	6.106	LA 14 / LA 82 Truck north (Veterans Memorial Drive) – Abbeville, Erath	Eastern terminus of LA 3267; east end of LA 82 Truck concurrency
1.000 mi = 1.609 km; 1.000 km = 0.621 mi: Concurrency terminus

== Louisiana Highway 3269 ==
Louisiana Highway 3269
- Location: Spearsville
- Length: 0.124 mi (200 m)
- Existed: 1990s–present

Louisiana Highway 3269 (LA 3269) runs 0.12 miles (0.19 km) in a northwest to southeast direction, looping off of LA 15 in Spearsville.

The entire highway is in Spearsville, Union Parish.

mi	km	Destinations	Notes
0.000	0.000	LA 15 – Lillie, Farmerville	Western terminus
0.124	0.200	LA 15 – Lillie, Farmerville	Eastern terminus
1.000 mi = 1.609 km; 1.000 km = 0.621 mi

== Louisiana Highway 3274 ==
Louisiana Highway 3274
- Location: Gramercy
- Length: 2.580 mi (4.152 km)
- Existed: c. 1997–present

Louisiana Highway 3274 (LA 3274) runs 2.58 miles (4.15 km) in a north–south direction from LA 44 to US 61 in Gramercy.

The route heads north on South Airline Avenue from LA 44 (Jefferson Highway) through the town of Gramercy. After intersecting LA 641 (Main Street), the local name becomes North Airline Avenue. Continuing northward, LA 3274 crosses LA 3125 before ending at a junction with US 61 (Airline Highway). LA 3274 is an undivided two-lane highway for its entire length.

LA 3274 was formerly part of LA 20 and connected to the remainder of that route via the Vacherie–Lutcher Ferry across the Mississippi River until that service was replaced by the nearby Veterans Memorial Bridge (or Gramercy Bridge) on LA 3213.

The entire highway is in Gramercy, St. James Parish.

mi	km	Destinations	Notes
0.000– 0.018	0.000– 0.029	LA 44 (Jefferson Highway) – Lutcher, Reserve	Southern terminus
0.348	0.560	LA 641 (Main Street) – Lutcher, New Orleans	
1.558	2.507	LA 3125 to I-10	
2.542– 2.580	4.091– 4.152	US 61 (Airline Highway) – LaPlace, Gonzales	Northern terminus
1.000 mi = 1.609 km; 1.000 km = 0.621 mi

== Louisiana Highway 3275 ==
Louisiana Highway 3275
- Location: Monroe
- Length: 0.373 mi (600 m)
- Existed: c. 1997–present

Louisiana Highway 3275 (LA 3275) runs 0.37 miles (0.60 km) in a north–south direction along Sterlington Road, consisting of a partially one-way connector between US 165 and the concurrent US 80/US 165 Bus. in Monroe. The route's mileposts increase from the northern end contrary to common practice.

The entire highway is in Monroe, Ouachita Parish.

mi	km	Destinations	Notes
0.373	0.600	US 80 / US 165 Bus. (DeSiard Street)	Southern terminus
0.000	0.000	US 165 (Sterlington Road, Martin Luther King Jr. Drive) to US 80	Northern terminus
1.000 mi = 1.609 km; 1.000 km = 0.621 mi

== Louisiana Highway 3276 ==
Louisiana Highway 3276
- Location: Stonewall
- Length: 4.791 mi (7.710 km)
- Existed: c. 1991–present

Louisiana Highway 3276 (LA 3276) runs 4.79 miles (7.71 km) in an east–west direction along Stonewall–Frierson Road from US 171 in Stonewall to a point east of I-49.

The entire highway is in DeSoto Parish.

Location	mi	km	Destinations	Notes
Stonewall	0.000– 0.017	0.000– 0.027	US 171 – Shreveport, Mansfield	Western terminus
	4.302– 4.451	6.923– 7.163	I-49 – Shreveport, Alexandria	Exit 191 on I-49
	4.791	7.710	PR 16 east (Stonewall–Frierson Road) – Frierson	Eastern terminus
1.000 mi = 1.609 km; 1.000 km = 0.621 mi

== Louisiana Highway 3277 ==
Louisiana Highway 3277
- Location: Evangeline Parish
- Length: 10.380 mi (16.705 km)
- Existed: 1994–present

Louisiana Highway 3277 (LA 3277) runs 10.38 miles (16.70 km) in a general north–south direction from US 190 in Basile to LA 104 northeast of Basile.

The route was renumbered in 1994 from its original designation as LA 371 to prevent a numerical duplication with the newly commissioned US 371.

Parish	Location	mi	km	Destinations	Notes
Acadia–Evangeline parish line	Basile	0.000	0.000	US 190 (Basile–Eunice Highway) – Elton, Eunice	Southern terminus
Evangeline	Basile	0.508	0.818	LA 1157-1 (East Stagg Avenue)	Eastern terminus of LA 1157-1
Evangeline		2.447	3.938	LA 1158 (Hunter Road)	Southern terminus of LA 1158
Evangeline		5.465	8.795	LA 757 (Old Basile Highway) – Eunice	Western terminus of LA 757
Evangeline		8.269	13.308	LA 374 (Duralde Highway) – Duralde, Fenris	Western terminus of LA 374
Evangeline		10.380	16.705	LA 104 (Oberlin Road) – Mamou, Oberlin	Northern terminus
1.000 mi = 1.609 km; 1.000 km = 0.621 mi

== Louisiana Highway 3278 ==
Louisiana Highway 3278
- Location: Natchitoches
- Length: 2.064 mi (3.322 km)
- Existed: 1990s–present

Louisiana Highway 3278 (LA 3278) runs 2.06 miles (3.32 km) in an east–west direction from LA 504 to LA 6 in Natchitoches.

The route is a remnant of the original two-lane alignment of LA 6.

The entire highway is in Natchitoches, Natchitoches Parish.

mi	km	Destinations	Notes
0.000	0.000	LA 504	Western terminus
2.054– 2.064	3.306– 3.322	LA 6 (University Parkway) – Natchitoches, Many	Eastern terminus
1.000 mi = 1.609 km; 1.000 km = 0.621 mi

== Louisiana Highway 3279 ==
Louisiana Highway 3279
- Location: Natchitoches Parish
- Length: 2.361 mi (3.800 km)
- Existed: 1990s–present

Louisiana Highway 3279 (LA 3279) runs 2.36 miles (3.80 km) in a north–south direction along Parish Road from LA 1 to LA 490 east of Chopin.

The route serves as a connector from LA 1 to LA 490 between Galbraith and Marco. It facilitates access from northbound LA 1 to the Red River Lock and Dam opposite Colfax. LA 3279 is an undivided two-lane highway for its entire length.

The entire route is in Natchitoches Parish.

mi	km	Destinations	Notes
0.000	0.000	LA 1 – Boyce, Natchitoches	Southern terminus
2.361	3.800	LA 490 – Marco	Northern terminus
1.000 mi = 1.609 km; 1.000 km = 0.621 mi

== Louisiana Highway 3280 ==
Louisiana Highway 3280
- Location: West Monroe–Monroe
- Length: 0.180 mi (290 m)
- Existed: 1990s–present

Louisiana Highway 3280 (LA 3280) runs 0.18 miles (0.29 km) in an east–west direction, consisting solely of the state-maintained Endom Bridge across the Ouachita River constructed in 2003. The route's mileposts increase from the eastern end contrary to common practice.

The swing bridge connects Coleman Avenue in West Monroe with DeSiard Street in Monroe. LA 3280 is an undivided two-lane highway for its entire length.

The entire highway is in Ouachita Parish.

Location	mi	km	Destinations	Notes
West Monroe	0.180	0.290	Begin state maintenance at junction of Coleman Avenue and South Riverfront Street	Western terminus
West Monroe–Monroe line	0.180– 0.000	0.290– 0.000	Endom Bridge over Ouachita River	
Monroe	0.000	0.000	End state maintenance at DeSiard Street	Eastern terminus
1.000 mi = 1.609 km; 1.000 km = 0.621 mi

== Louisiana Highway 3281 ==
Louisiana Highway 3281
- Location: Farmerville
- Length: 0.378 mi (608 m)
- Existed: 1990s–present

Louisiana Highway 3281 (LA 3281) runs 0.38 miles (0.61 km) in an east–west direction along Park Street from a point near Betty Street to a junction with the concurrent LA 15/LA 33 in Farmerville. The route's mileposts increase from the eastern end contrary to common practice.

As of 2020, it is the highest numbered state highway in active service.

The entire highway is in Farmerville, Union Parish.

mi	km	Destinations	Notes
0.378	0.608	Begin state maintenance on Park Street	Western terminus
0.000	0.000	LA 15 / LA 33 (South Main Street)	Eastern terminus
1.000 mi = 1.609 km; 1.000 km = 0.621 mi

== Louisiana Highway 3282 ==
Louisiana Highway 3282
- Location: Denham Springs
- Length: 0.792 mi (1,275 m)
- Existed: 1990s–2017

Louisiana Highway 3282 (LA 3282) ran 0.79 miles (1.27 km) in an east–west direction along Centerville Street East from LA 16 to LA 1031 in Denham Springs.

The route was transferred to local control in 2017 as part of the La DOTD Road Transfer Program.

The entire highway was in Denham Springs, Livingston Parish.

mi	km	Destinations	Notes
0.000	0.000	LA 16 (North Range Avenue, North Hummell Street)	Western terminus; one-way pair
0.792	1.275	LA 1031 (Hatchell Lane)	Eastern terminus
1.000 mi = 1.609 km; 1.000 km = 0.621 mi

== Louisiana Highway 3284 ==
Louisiana Highway 3284
- Location: Monroe
- Length: 0.71 mi (1,140 m)
- Existed: 1990s–2002

Louisiana Highway 3284 (LA 3284) ran 0.71 miles (1.14 km) in an east–west direction along Forsythe Avenue from LA 840-6 to US 165 in Monroe.

The entire highway was in Monroe, Ouachita Parish.

mi	km	Destinations	Notes
0.00	0.00	LA 840-6 (Forsythe Avenue, Forsythe Bypass)	Western terminus
0.71	1.14	US 165 (Sterlington Road)	Eastern terminus
1.000 mi = 1.609 km; 1.000 km = 0.621 mi

== Louisiana Highway 3285 ==
Louisiana Highway 3285
- Location: Watson
- Length: 0.687 mi (1,106 m)
- Existed: 1990s–2013

Louisiana Highway 3285 (LA 3285) ran 0.69 miles (1.11 km) in a north–south direction along Old Highway 16 from LA 1019 to LA 16 in Watson.

As its local name indicates, LA 3285 was a bypassed section of LA 16 that remained in the state highway system for a time. It was formerly designated as LA 16 Spur. LA 3285 was an undivided two-lane highway for its entire length.

The entire highway was in Watson, Livingston Parish.

mi	km	Destinations	Notes
0.000	0.000	LA 1019 (Old Highway 16, Springfield Road)	Southern terminus
0.687	1.106	LA 16 – Denham Springs, Montpelier	Northern terminus
1.000 mi = 1.609 km; 1.000 km = 0.621 mi

== Louisiana Highway 3286 ==
Louisiana Highway 3286
- Location: Gray
- Length: 0.30 mi (480 m)
- Existed: 1990s–1990s

Louisiana Highway 3286 (LA 3286) ran 0.30 miles (0.48 km) in an east–west direction along Linda Ann Avenue off of US 90 and LA 24 in Gray.

The entire highway was in Gray, Terrebonne Parish.

mi	km	Destinations	Notes
0.00	0.00	LA 24 – Houma, Thibodaux	Western terminus
0.30	0.48	End state maintenance on Linda Ann Avenue	Eastern terminus
1.000 mi = 1.609 km; 1.000 km = 0.621 mi
