= LA 18 =

LA 18 may refer to:

- KSCI (also known as KSCI-TV and LA-18) Los Angeles TV station
- Louisiana Highway 18
- 18th Street gang, a transnational criminal gang
