= Louisiana Highway 20 =

State highway in Louisiana, United States

Louisiana Highway 20

Route information
- Maintained by Louisiana DOTD
- Length: 36.6 mi (58.9 km)
- Existed: 1955 renumbering–present

Major junctions
- West end: LA 182 in Gibson
- Future I-49 / US 90 in Gibson; Future I-49 / US 90 in Chacahoula; LA 24 in Schriever; LA 1 / LA 308 in Thibodaux; LA 3127 in North Vacherie
- East end: LA 18 in North Vacherie

Location
- Country: United States
- State: Louisiana
- Parishes: Terrebonne, Lafourche, St. James

Highway system
- Louisiana State Highway System; Interstate; US; State; Scenic
← I-20	→ LA 21

Louisiana Highway 20 (LA 20) is a state highway that serves Terrebonne Parish, Lafourche Parish, and St. James Parish. It spans a total of 36.6 miles (58.9 km) as a two lane, undivided road.

== Route description ==
From the south, LA 20 begins at LA 182 in the northwest Terrebonne Parish town of Gibson. The road parallels then intersects U.S. 90 (Future I-49) at two locations (Exits 189 & 194) as it heads northeastward, where it intersects LA 24 in Schriever. LA 20 turns due north and intersects LA 1 in Thibodaux as it continues northward. The road then passes through Chackbay before it enters St. James Parish. LA 20 runs northward through South Vacherie and ends at an intersection with LA 18 in North Vacherie.

== History ==
In 1972, LA 20 was routed off of Jackson Street in downtown Thibodaux and onto parallel Canal Boulevard, a four-lane, largely residential thoroughfare. The extension of Canal Boulevard north of Bayou Lafourche was to be opened soon, bypassing St. Patrick Street. The route change was opposed by Thibodaux's mayor, Warren Harang, and the Louisiana Department of Highways agreed to keep truck traffic routed via Jackson Street, which was retained as LA 20 Spur. By the late 1990s, LA 20 was routed back onto Jackson Street, reinstating a short concurrency with LA 1 from St. Mary Street to West 1st Street and utilizing LA 308 to connect with North Canal Boulevard.

In Vacherie, LA 20 originally turned east along LA 18 and crossed the Mississippi River by ferry to Lutcher. It then followed what is now LA 3274 to a terminus at US 61 (Airline Highway). The ferry service was replaced by the newly opened Gramercy Bridge (or Veterans Memorial Bridge) in May 1995, and LA 20 was truncated to its present terminus in Vacherie two years later.

== Major intersections ==
Parish	Location	mi	km	Destinations	Notes
Terrebonne	Gibson	0.0	0.0	LA 182 (Bayou Black Drive)	Western terminus
Terrebonne	Gibson	1.2	1.9	US 90 – Morgan City, New Orleans	Exit 189 on US 90
Terrebonne	Chacahoula	5.6	9.0	LA 309 north (Brule Guillot Road)	Southern terminus of LA 309
Terrebonne	Chacahoula	5.9	9.5	US 90 – Morgan City, New Orleans	Exit 194 on US 90
Lafourche	No major junctions				
Terrebonne	Schriever	12.5	20.1	LA 24 east (Main Street, Park Avenue) – Houma	Interchange; western terminus of LA 24
Terrebonne	Schriever	13.7	22.0	LA 3185 (Elizabeth Street)	Southeastern terminus of LA 3185
Terrebonne	Schriever	14.8	23.8	LA 648 (Percy Brown Road)	Southwestern terminus of LA 648
Lafourche	Thibodaux	16.4	26.4	LA 1 north (St. Mary Street) – Napoleonville	West end of LA 1 concurrency
Lafourche	Thibodaux	16.5	26.6	LA 1 south (West 1st Street) – Raceland	East end of LA 1 concurrency
Lafourche	Thibodaux	16.6	26.7	LA 308 north (Bayou Road) – Napoleonville	West end of LA 308 concurrency
Lafourche	Thibodaux	16.9	27.2	LA 308 south (Bayou Road) – Raceland	East end of LA 308 concurrency
Lafourche	Chackbay	22.7	36.5	LA 304	Northeastern terminus of LA 304
Lafourche	Chackbay	27.7	44.6	LA 307 south – Kraemer	Northern terminus of LA 307
St. James	South Vacherie	31.6	50.9	LA 643 east – Lac Des Allemands	Western terminus of LA 643
St. James	South Vacherie	32.0	51.5	LA 644 east	Western terminus of LA 644
St. James	North Vacherie	33.9	54.6	LA 3127 – Donaldsonville, Boutte	
St. James	North Vacherie	36.6	58.9	LA 18 (River Road) – Donaldsonville, Luling / Mississippi River Bridge	Eastern terminus
1.000 mi = 1.609 km; 1.000 km = 0.621 mi: Concurrency terminus
