= 3260 =

3260 may refer to:

- A.D. 3260, a year in the 4th millennium CE
- 3260 BC, a year in the 4th millennium BCE
- 3260, a number in the 3000 (number) range

== Other uses ==
- 3260 Vizbor, an asteroid in the Asteroid Belt, the 3260th asteroid registered
- Louisiana Highway 3260, a state highway
- Texas Ranch to Market Road 3260, a state highway
