= 3140 =

3140 may refer to:

- A.D. 3140, a year in the 4th millennium CE
- 3140 BC, a year in the 4th millennium BCE
- 3140, a number in the 3000 (number) range

== Other uses ==
- 3140 Stellafane, an asteroid in the Asteroid Belt, the 3140th asteroid registered
- Hawaii Route 3140, a state highway
- Louisiana Highway 3140, a state highway
- Texas Farm to Market Road 3140, a state highway
