= Louisiana Highway 18 =

State highway in Louisiana, United States

Louisiana Highway 18

Route information
- Maintained by Louisiana DOTD
- Length: 79.7 mi (128.3 km)
- Existed: 1955 renumbering–present

Major junctions
- West end: LA 1 / LA 3089 in Donaldsonville
- LA 20 in North Vacherie LA 3213 in Wallace; LA 640 in Edgard; I-310 in Luling; US 90 in Bridge City; LA 45 in Marrero LA 3017 in Harvey
- East end: US 90 Bus. / Future I-49 / LA 23 in Gretna

Location
- Country: United States
- State: Louisiana
- Parishes: Ascension, St. James, St. John the Baptist, St. Charles, Jefferson

Highway system
- Louisiana State Highway System; Interstate; US; State; Scenic
| ← LA 17 | → LA 19 |

Louisiana Highway 18 (LA 18) is a state highway that serves Ascension, St. James, St. John the Baptist, St. Charles, and Jefferson Parishes. Called the Great River Road, it runs from west to east, parallel to the west bank of the Mississippi River, running from Donaldsonville to Gretna. It spans a total of 79.7 miles (128.3 km). In the more rural parts of LA 18's span, it is commonly referred to as River Road, but it becomes 4th Street once it enters Westwego.

== Route description ==
LA 18 begins as an undivided, two lane road in downtown Donaldsonville as Bayou Road, which runs parallel to the Mississippi River. It intersects with the Sunshine Bridge (LA 70) east of Donaldsonville, the Veterans Memorial Bridge (LA 3213) in Wallace, and Interstate 310 near Luling as it continues downriver. At Bridge City, LA 18 leaves the river and briefly merges with U.S. Highway 90 northbound, then turns east along Seven Oaks Blvd. while U.S. 90 crosses the Mississippi River via the Huey P. Long Bridge. LA 18 meets and briefly conjoins the alternate river road, LA 541. When LA 18 enters Westwego, LA 18 becomes 4th Street but still continues parallel to the river. In Gretna, LA 18 turns south, away from the river: first onto Huey P. Long Avenue for one block, then east along 5th Street to Lafayette Street. LA 18 then goes south and ends at the intersection of Lafayette St. and the Westbank Expressway.

== History ==
Between the junction with LA 52 in Luling and Huey P. Long Avenue in downtown Gretna, LA 18 is largely the original routing of U.S. Highway 90 (also LA 2 before the 1955 renumbering) and before that, the Old Spanish Trail highway. (One notable exception is that LA 18 is routed along Louisiana Street rather than the parallel Sala Avenue through Westwego's historic district.)

== Major intersections ==
| Parish | Location | mi | km | Destinations | Notes |
|---|---|---|---|---|---|
| Ascension | Donaldsonville | 0.0 | 0.0 | LA 1 (West 10th Street) – Thibodaux, Plaquemine LA 3089 east (Marchand Drive) | Western terminus; Western terminus of LA 3089 |
| Ascension | | 3.1 | 5.0 | LA 3120 | Northwestern terminus of LA 3120 |
| St. James | | 8.3 | 13.4 | LA 70 – Donaldsonville, Sorrento | LA 70 passes overhead via Sunshine Bridge across Mississippi River; indirect access via frontage road |
| St. James | Lagan | 20.4 | 32.8 | LA 3219 | Northern terminus of LA 3219 |
| St. James | North Vacherie | 26.5 | 42.6 | LA 20 west – Thibodaux | Eastern terminus of LA 20 |
| St. John the Baptist | Wallace | 30.9 | 49.7 | LA 3213 north to I-10 – Gramercy LA 3213 south – Donaldsonville | Interchange; LA 3213 passes overhead via Gramercy Bridge over Mississippi River |
| St. John the Baptist | | 33.9 | 54.6 | LA 639 | Northern terminus of LA 639; Unsigned junction |
| St. John the Baptist | Edgard | 38.9 | 62.6 | LA 640 north | West end of LA 640 concurrency; Until 2013, LA 640 crossed Mississippi River via Reserve-Edgard Ferry to LA 44 and LA 53 |
| St. John the Baptist | Edgard | 39.1 | 62.9 | LA 640 south | East end of LA 640 concurrency |
| St. Charles | Killona | 46.1 | 74.2 | LA 3141 (Mary Plantation Road) | Northern terminus of LA 3141 |
| St. Charles | Taft | 48.2 | 77.6 | LA 3142 | Northern terminus of LA 3142; Unsigned junction |
| St. Charles | Hahnville | 51.8 | 83.4 | LA 3160 (Home Place) | Northeastern terminus of LA 3160 |
| St. Charles | Luling | 55.1 | 88.7 | I-310 north – New Orleans I-310 south to US 90 – Boutte | Interchange; exit 7 on I-310; I-310 passes overhead via Luling Bridge across Mississippi River |
| St. Charles | Luling | 55.8 | 89.8 | LA 52 (Paul Maillard Road) – Boutte | Northern terminus of LA 52 |
| St. Charles | Luling | 57.3 | 92.2 | LA 3060 (Barton Avenue) | Northern terminus of LA 3060 |
| Jefferson | | 69.7 | 112.2 | LA 541 (River Road) – Bridge City | Western terminus of LA 541 |
| Jefferson | | 70.1 | 112.8 | US 90 west – Boutte | West end of U.S. 90 concurrency |
| Jefferson | Bridge City | 71.0 | 114.3 | US 90 east – New Orleans | East end of U.S. 90 concurrency; At Huey P. Long Bridge across Mississippi River |
| Jefferson | Westwego | 72.3 | 116.4 | LA 541 (River Road) | West end of LA 541 concurrency |
| Jefferson | Westwego | 72.8 | 117.2 | LA 541 (River Road) | East end of LA 541 concurrency |
| Jefferson | Westwego | 73.3 | 118.0 | LA 18 Spur (Louisiana Street) | Northern terminus of LA 18 Spur |
| Jefferson | Marrero | 76.3 | 122.8 | LA 45 south (Barataria Boulevard) to US 90 Bus. (West Bank Expressway) | Northern terminus of LA 45; Junction includes incorrect signage |
| Jefferson | Marrero | 76.6 | 123.3 | LA 560-2 (Barataria Boulevard) | Southern terminus of LA 560-2 |
| Jefferson | Harvey | 77.6 | 124.9 | LA 3018 (Destrehan Avenue) | Northern terminus of LA 3018; Unsigned junction |
| Jefferson | Harvey | 77.6 | 124.9 | LA 541 (Destrehan Avenue) | Eastern terminus of LA 541 |
| Jefferson | Harvey | 77.7 | 125.0 | Bridge over Harvey Canal | |
| Jefferson | Harvey | 77.8 | 125.2 | LA 3017 (Peters Road, Bark Street) | Northern terminus of LA 3017 |
| Jefferson | Gretna | 79.2 | 127.5 | LA 466 (5th Street) | Western terminus of LA 466; Unsigned junction |
| Jefferson | Gretna | 79.7 | 128.3 | US 90 Bus. (West Bank Expressway) – New Orleans; LA 23 (Lafayette Street, West Bank Expressway) – Belle Chasse | Southern terminus; Partially unsigned junction |
1.000 mi = 1.609 km; 1.000 km = 0.621 mi: Concurrency terminus; Incomplete access

== Louisiana Highway 18 Spur ==
Louisiana Highway 18 Spur
- Location: Westwego
- Length: 0.62 mi (1,000 m)
- Existed: 1960s–present

In Westwego, LA 18 turns from Louisiana Street onto 4th Street. LA 18 Spur continues southward for 0.6 miles (0.97 km) on Louisiana Street until it meets the Westbank Expressway (U.S. 90 Business).

The entire highway is in Westwego, Jefferson Parish.

| mi | km | Destinations | Notes |
|---|---|---|---|
| 0.00 | 0.00 | LA 18 (Louisiana Street, 4th Street) | Northern terminus |
| 0.62 | 1.00 | US 90 Bus. (West Bank Expressway) – New Orleans | Southern terminus |
1.000 mi = 1.609 km; 1.000 km = 0.621 mi
