= Airline Highway =

Highway in Louisiana, United States

Airline Highway
- Route of the Airline Highway highlighted in red

Route information
- Maintained by Louisiana DOTD
- Length: 115.6 mi (186.0 km)
- Existed: 1925 (planned); 1927 (first section opened); 1953 (last section opened)–present
- Component highways: US 61 from New Orleans to Baton Rouge; US 190 from Baton Rouge to near Krotz Springs

Major junctions
- Southeast end: US 61 in New Orleans
- I-10 in New Orleans; I-310 in St. Rose; US 51 in LaPlace; I-10 southeast of Sorrento; I-12 / US 190 / I-110 / US 61 in Baton Rouge
- Northwest end: US 190 east of Krotz Springs

Location
- Country: United States
- State: Louisiana
- Parishes: Orleans, Jefferson, St. Charles, St. John the Baptist, St. James, Ascension, East Baton Rouge, West Baton Rouge, Pointe Coupee

Highway system
- United States Numbered Highway System; List; Special; Divided; Louisiana State Highway System; Interstate; US; State; Scenic

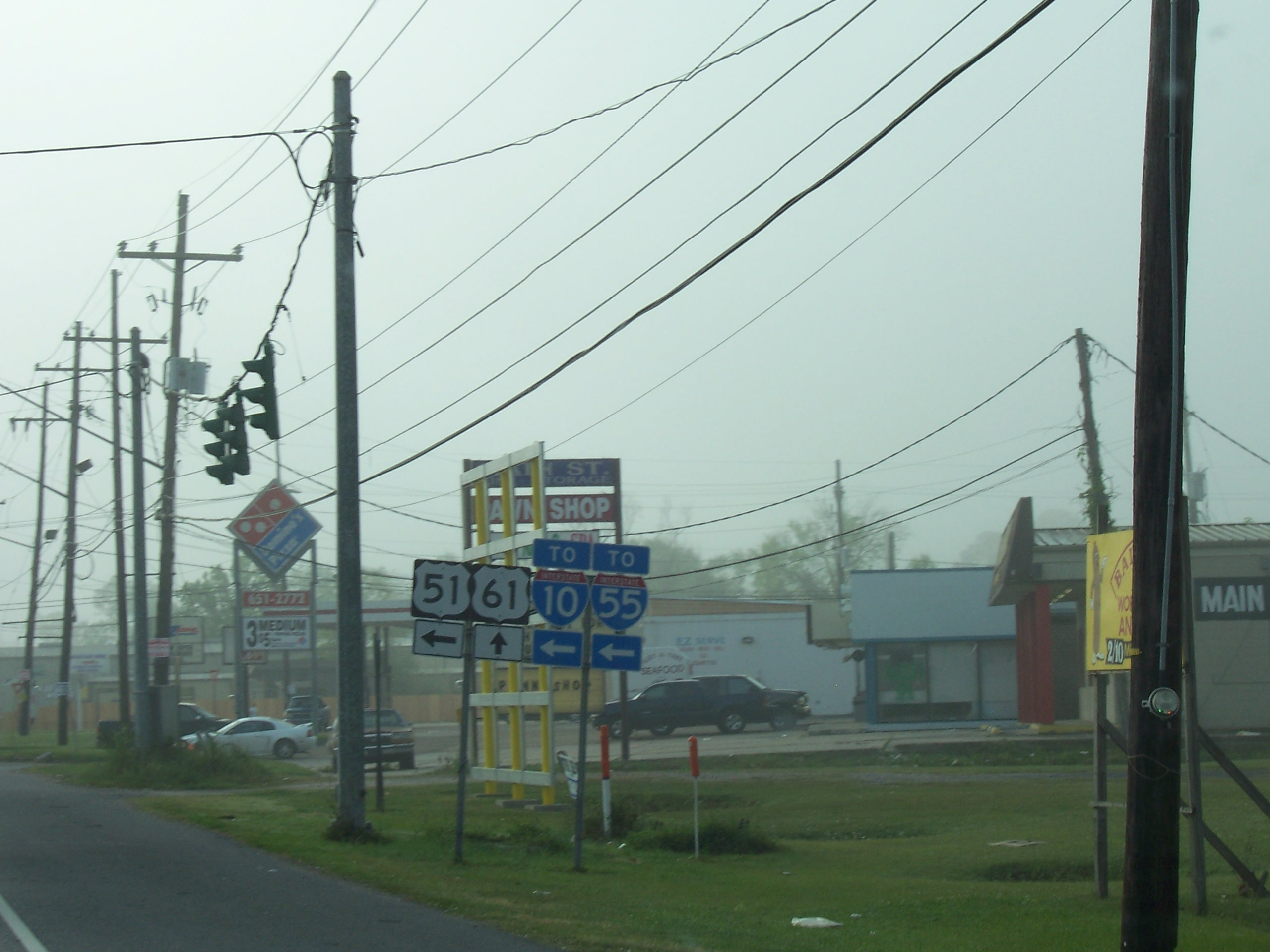
Sign showing the intersection of U.S. Highway 61 (Airline Highway) at U.S. Highway 51 in LaPlace, Louisiana

Airline Highway is a divided highway in the U.S. state of Louisiana, built in stages between 1925 and 1953 to bypass the older Jefferson Highway. It runs 115.6 miles (186.0 km), carrying U.S. Highway 61 from New Orleans northwest to Baton Rouge and U.S. Highway 190 from Baton Rouge west over the Mississippi River on the Huey P. Long Bridge. US 190 continues west towards Opelousas on an extension built at roughly the same time.

The highway was named "Airline" because it runs relatively straight on a new alignment, rather than alongside the winding Mississippi River. (Compare with the similar term air-line railroad.) The name later became even more fitting, as both Louis Armstrong New Orleans International Airport and Baton Rouge Metropolitan Airport were built along the highway. Airline Highway also runs close to the site of the old Baton Rouge airfield (near the intersection of Airline and Florida Boulevard, now a park and government office complex), which brings it within blocks of the similarly named Airport Avenue and Airway Drive.

== History ==
The highway's origin is famously identified with Governor Huey P. Long, who advocated for a modern highway system in Louisiana. Though the project was underway when Long took office, most of its initial construction was completed during his administration. The Airline Highway was considered a pet project of Long's as it reduced the length of his journey between the capitol building in Baton Rouge and the bars and establishments in New Orleans, namely The Sazerac Bar in the Roosevelt Hotel. Originally, Airline Highway was a two-lane road that ran from Prairieville to Shrewsbury. The first section, running between Williams Boulevard in Kenner and Shrewsbury Road, opened in June 1927. It was begun by the Jefferson Parish Police Jury as a local road and incorporated into the plan for Airline Highway during construction. The remainder of the highway was built between 1928 and 1933 by the Louisiana Highway Commission with federal aid, as the road would carry US 61 upon completion.

The section north of the spillway was officially opened on July 4, 1933, and the section on the south side followed three weeks later. (Various sections had been temporarily opened to traffic beginning in October 1931.) Completion of the bridge over the Bonnet Carré Spillway was delayed until 1935, necessitating a detour over the Jefferson Highway (River Road) via temporary gravel roads along the spillway guide levees. The spillway bridge was opened to traffic on September 28, 1935 and dedicated on December 13.

At this time, traffic was routed from Prairieville into Baton Rouge over the Jefferson Highway (today's LA 73). On the New Orleans end, travelers had the option to continue on Airline Highway and follow Metairie Road (the original route of Jefferson Highway) into town or transfer to the Jefferson Highway (today's LA 48) at Kenner and follow the direct connection onto South Claiborne Avenue completed in 1928.

The first improvements to the Airline Highway began in 1935 and consisted of widening and re-surfacing the Kenner-Shrewsbury link built a decade earlier. The new four-lane section from Williams Boulevard to Haring Road opened in October 1937. The new four- and six-lane section from Haring Road to Labarre Road opened in December 1938. The latter project included a slight re-alignment and extension on the Shrewsbury end. (Present-day Robertson Street is a remnant of the old alignment.) The eight-lane extension into Tulane Avenue (reached by a now-demolished six-lane bridge over the former New Basin Canal) was officially opened on August 26, 1940.

Also in 1940, the Old Mississippi River Bridge opened in Baton Rouge. With this occurrence, a 7.9 mile bypass was built around the city that went to the Nesser Overpass, opening to traffic in July 1941—this bypass was part of Airline Highway, but it was not connected to the rest of the highway until 1953. A further extension continued west to the Atchafalaya Bridge at Krotz Springs. The remainder of the highway was multilaned in sections during the 1940s and the 1950s. For a short time in that decade, it was the longest toll-free four-lane highway in the nation, as the multilaned portion ran 124 miles from the Atchafalaya River to New Orleans. The spillway bridge carried four very narrow lanes of traffic (often resulting in accidents) until 1984 when a parallel bridge was constructed.

The majority of the New Orleans-Baton Rouge section was built parallel to the Louisiana Railway and Navigation Company, which was itself built later than the slightly longer Yazoo and Mississippi Valley Railroad. The former Louisiana Railway, now part of the Kansas City Southern Railway, crosses the Huey Long Bridge with the highway and splits to the northwest towards Shreveport; the extension to Opelousas parallels the New Orleans, Texas and Mexico Railway (later part of the Missouri Pacific Railroad).

Originally US Highways 65 and 51 were cosigned to Airline (65 the entire length, and 51 from LaPlace to New Orleans). In 1951, Louisiana truncated the route lengths, and the highway, with the exception of a portion in north Baton Rouge, is signed as US 61.

In an effort to clean up the highway's notorious history due to the seedy hotels and motels that once lined it, the portion in Jefferson Parish has been renamed Airline Drive.

=== Baton Rouge bypass ===
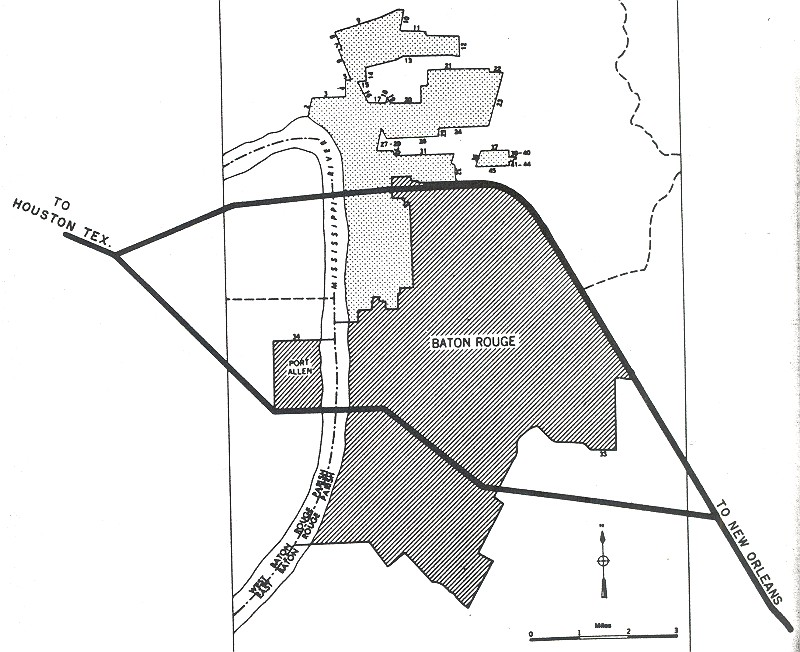
1955 Interstate Highway plans, showing the Baton Rouge bypass on the Airline Highway as an urban route (numbered I-410 by 1959)

The portion of the Airline Highway north and east of downtown Baton Rouge carries U.S. Highway 61 and U.S. Highway 190 around downtown, and includes several interchanges. The bypass was designated U.S. Highway 61/190 Bypass from 1957 to 1963, after which US 61 and US 190 were moved onto it, and their old routes through downtown became US 61 Business/US 190 Business. The bypass and business routes originally intersected in a traffic circle, which was replaced in 1963 by a cloverleaf interchange.

In the original 1955 plan for urban Interstate Highways, numbered by 1959, the Baton Rouge bypass was designated Interstate 410; it would have connected to Interstate 10 on both ends (as I-10 would have used the US 190 corridor immediately west of Baton Rouge, still crossing the Atchafalaya Swamp in its present location). The route was cancelled by the end of the 1960s, and the number was later reused for another I-410 (which itself was cancelled in 1977).

== Major intersections ==
Parish	Location	mi	km	Destinations	Notes
Orleans	New Orleans	115.0	185.1	US 61 south (Tulane Avenue)	Southeastern terminus; south end of US 61 concurrency
Orleans	New Orleans	114.6– 114.5	184.4– 184.3	I-10 west – N.O. Int'l Airport, Baton Rouge (northbound) I-10 east to US 90 Bus. – Westbank (southbound)	Exit 232 on I-10
Jefferson	Metairie	113.7– 113.5	183.0– 182.7	LA 3046 south (Causeway Boulevard) to US 90 (Jefferson Highway)	Interchange; northern terminus of LA 3046 (not signed)
Jefferson	Metairie	112.7	181.4	LA 611-9 (Severn Avenue)	Western terminus of LA 611-9; to Metairie Road
Jefferson	Metairie	112.5	181.1	To LA 3139 south (Earhart Expressway)	At Cleary Avenue
Jefferson	Metairie	112.2	180.6	LA 3152 north (Clearview Parkway) LA 3152 south (South Clearview Parkway) to LA 3139 (Earhart Expressway)	
Jefferson	Metairie	112.0	180.2	LA 3154 south (Hickory Avenue) – Harahan	Northern terminus of LA 3154
Jefferson	Metairie	111.5	179.4	LA 3155 (Little Farms Avenue)	Northern terminus of LA 3155 (not signed)
Jefferson	Kenner	110.8	178.3	LA 49 north (Williams Boulevard) to I-10	Southern terminus of LA 49
St. Charles	St. Rose	109.3	175.9	LA 50 (Almedia Road) – Almedia	Northern terminus of LA 50
St. Charles	St. Rose	108.4– 108.2	174.5– 174.1	I-310 – Boutte, Baton Rouge	Exit 2 on I-310
St. Charles	Destrehan	107.0	172.2	LA 626 (St. Rose Avenue) – Destrehan, St. Rose	Northern terminus of LA 626
St. Charles	Norco	105.4	169.6	LA 627 (Prospect Avenue)	Northern terminus of LA 627
St. Charles	Norco	104.0	167.4	LA 48 east (Apple Street)	Western terminus of LA 48
St. Charles		101.4– 101.2	163.2– 162.9	U.S. 61 Bonnet Carré Spillway Bridge	
St. Charles	Montz	100.5	161.7	LA 628 west (CC Road) – Montz	Eastern terminus of LA 628
St. John the Baptist	LaPlace	99.2	159.6	LA 3217 south	Northern terminus of LA 3217
St. John the Baptist	LaPlace	98.2	158.0	LA 636-1 south (McReine Road)	Northern terminus of LA 636-1
St. John the Baptist	LaPlace	96.2	154.8	LA 44 west (Main Street)	Eastern terminus of LA 44
St. John the Baptist	LaPlace	96.1	154.7	US 51 north to I-10 / I-55	Southern terminus of US 51
St. John the Baptist	LaPlace	96.0	154.5	LA 3188 north (Belle Terre Boulevard) to I-10	Southern terminus of LA 3188
St. John the Baptist	Reserve	94.8	152.6	LA 3179 south (East 22nd Street)	Northern terminus of LA 3179
St. John the Baptist	Reserve	93.0	149.7	LA 53 south (Central Avenue) – Reserve–Edgard Ferry	Northern terminus of LA 53
St. John the Baptist	Reserve	90.0	144.8	LA 637 south (West 10th Street)	Northern terminus of LA 637
St. John the Baptist	Garyville	86.2	138.7	LA 54 south – Garyville, Mt. Airy	Northern terminus of LA 54
St. James		84.5	136.0	LA 641 north to I-10 LA 641 south to LA 3213 – Gramercy, Lutcher, Convent	LA 3213 southbound leads to Gramercy Bridge (not signed)
St. James	Gramercy	82.2	132.3	LA 3274 (North Airline Avenue)	Northern terminus of LA 3274
Ascension		81.5– 81.2	131.2– 130.7	I-10 west – Baton Rouge (northbound) I-10 east – New Orleans (southbound)	Exit 187 on I-10
Ascension		80.2	129.1	LA 3140	Western terminus of LA 3140
Ascension	Sorrento	78.0	125.5	LA 22 – Sunshine Bridge, Donaldsonville	
Ascension	Brittany	74.2	119.4	LA 30 – LSU; LA 431 – Port Vincent, Denham Springs	Eastern terminus of LA 30; southern terminus of LA 431
Ascension	Gonzales	72.0	115.9	LA 939 (South Purpera Avenue)	Eastern terminus of LA 939
Ascension	Gonzales	71.0	114.3	LA 3038 (East Cornerview Street)	Eastern terminus of LA 3038
Ascension	Gonzales	69.200	111.367	LA 429 (Weber City Road, East Ascension Street)	
Ascension	Gonzales	68.2	109.8	LA 44 (North Burnside Avenue)	
Ascension		67.4	108.5	LA 74 west	Eastern terminus of LA 74
Ascension		66.2	106.5	LA 621	
Ascension	Prairieville	64.0	103.0	LA 73 south (Old Jefferson Highway)	South end of LA 73 concurrency
Ascension	Prairieville	61.2	98.5	LA 73 north (Old Jefferson Highway)	North end of LA 73 concurrency
Ascension	Prairieville	60.0	96.6	LA 42 east	South end of LA 42 concurrency
Ascension	Prairieville	57.9	93.2	LA 427 (Perkins Road)	
East Baton Rouge		54.2	87.2	LA 42 west / LA 948 (Highland Road)	North end of LA 42 concurrency; western terminus of LA 948
East Baton Rouge	Baton Rouge	51.0	82.1	LA 73 south (Jefferson Highway)	South end of LA 73 concurrency
East Baton Rouge	Baton Rouge	47.0	75.6	LA 3246 west (Siegen Lane)	Eastern terminus of LA 3246
East Baton Rouge		45.8– 45.6	73.7– 73.4	LA 73 north (Jefferson Highway)	Interchange; northbound exit and southbound entrance; North end of LA 73 concurrency
East Baton Rouge	Baton Rouge	44.2– 71.6	71.1– 115.2	I-12 – Baton Rouge, Hammond	Exit 2A–B on I-12
East Baton Rouge	Baton Rouge	43.0	69.2	LA 426 (Old Hammond Highway)	
East Baton Rouge	Baton Rouge	41.0– 40.50	66.0– 65.18	US 190 east (Florida Boulevard) – Hammond US 61 Bus. / US 190 Bus. (Florida Boulevard)	Interchange; east end of US 190 concurrency; Southeastern terminus of US 61/190 Business
East Baton Rouge	Baton Rouge	38.2– 38.0	61.5– 61.2	LA 37 (Greenwell Springs Road) – Baton Rouge, Greenwell Springs	Interchange
East Baton Rouge	Baton Rouge	36.4– 36.2	58.6– 58.3	LA 67 (Plank Road) – Baker–Zachary, Clinton	Interchange; no access to and from I-110.
East Baton Rouge	Baton Rouge	34.3– 34.0	55.2– 54.7	I-110 – Baton Rouge, Natchez	Exit 5B on I-110; to Metro Airport and St. Francisville (secondary signage)
East Baton Rouge	Baton Rouge	31.8– 31.4	51.2– 50.5	US 61 north (Scenic Highway) – Scotlandville US 61 Bus. / US 190 Bus. (Scenic Highway)	Interchange; north end of US 61 concurrency; northwestern terminus of US 61/190 Business; to Southern University
East Baton Rouge– West Baton Rouge line		30.2– 30.0	48.6– 48.3	Huey P. Long Bridge over Mississippi River	
West Baton Rouge		28.2– 28.0	45.4– 45.1	LA 1 south to I-10 – Port Allen, Plaquemine	Interchange; east end of LA 1 concurrency
West Baton Rouge	Lobdell	26.0	41.8	LA 415 (Plantation Avenue) to I-10	Interchange
West Baton Rouge	Lobdell	25.2	40.6	LA 415 Spur south (North Lobdell Highway) to I-10	Westbound entrance and eastbound exit; Northern terminus of LA 415 Spur
West Baton Rouge	Westover	24.0	38.6	LA 1145 south (Calumet Road)	Northern terminus of LA 1145
West Baton Rouge		21.5	34.6	LA 983 north (Bueche Road)	Southern terminus of LA 983
West Baton Rouge	Erwinville	21.0	33.8	LA 413 (Poydras Bayou Road) to I-10 – Rosedale, Lakeland	
Pointe Coupee		19.8	31.9	LA 1 north (Wye Road) – New Roads, Marksville	West end of LA 1 concurrency
Pointe Coupee	Torbert	17.0	27.4	LA 978 north (Bigman Lane)	Southern terminus of LA 978
Pointe Coupee	Livonia	15.8	25.4	LA 78 (Mississippi River Trail) – False River, New Roads, St. Francisville; LA 411 (Maringouin Road East) – Maringouin, Rosedale, Ramah	Southern terminus of LA 78; northern terminus of LA 411
Pointe Coupee	Livonia	12.6	20.3	LA 77 (Fordoche Road, Maringouin Road West) to I-10 – Maringouin, Fordoche	
Pointe Coupee	Blanks	10.0	16.1	LA 976	Northern terminus of LA 976
Pointe Coupee	Lottie	7.8	12.6	LA 81 (Charles Road) – Fordoche, Morganza	
Pointe Coupee		4.9– 4.5	7.9– 7.2	Bridge over Morganza Spillway	
Pointe Coupee		0.2	0.32	LA 975 – Sherburne, Sherburne Wildlife Management Area	Interchange; northern terminus of LA 975
Pointe Coupee		0.0	0.0	US 190 west – Opelousas	Northwestern terminus; west end of US 190 conurrency; At Atchafalaya River Bridge
1.000 mi = 1.609 km; 1.000 km = 0.621 mi: Concurrency terminus; Incomplete access
