= Leonville, Louisiana =

- Town
- Town of Leonville
- Location of Leonville in St. Landry Parish, Louisiana.

- Location of Louisiana in the United States
- Coordinates: 30°27′58″N 91°58′52″W
- Country: United States
- State: Louisiana
- Parish: St. Landry

Area
  - Total: 2.76 sq mi (7.15 km^{2})
  - Land: 2.73 sq mi (7.06 km^{2})
  - Water: 0.035 sq mi (0.09 km^{2})
- Elevation: 230 ft (70 m)

Population (2020)
  - Total: 868
  - Density: 318.5/sq mi (122.97/km^{2})
- Time zone: UTC-6 (CST)
  - Summer (DST): UTC-5 (CDT)
- Area code: 337
- FIPS code: 22-43395
- GNIS feature ID: 2406006
- Website: townofleonville.com

Leonville is a town in St. Landry Parish, Louisiana, United States. As of the 2020 census, Leonville had a population of 868. It is part of the Opelousas–Eunice Micropolitan Statistical Area.

== Geography ==
According to the United States Census Bureau, the town has a total area of 2.7 square miles (6.9 km^{2}), all land.

== Demographics ==
Historical population
Census	Pop.	Note	%±
1920	326		—
1930	408		25.2%
1940	451		10.5%
1950	514		14.0%
1960	526		2.3%
1970	512		−2.7%
1980	1,143		123.2%
1990	825		−27.8%
2000	1,007		22.1%
2010	1,084		7.6%
2020	868		−19.9%
2025 (est.)	870	▲	0.2%
U.S. Decennial Census

As of the 2010 United States census, there were 1,084 people living in the town. The racial makeup of the town was 58.3% White, 40.8% Black, 0.1% Native American and 0.3% from two or more races. 0.6% were Hispanic or Latino of any race.

As of the census of 2000, there were 1,007 people, 365 households, and 281 families living in the town. The population density was 376.9 inhabitants per square mile (145.5/km^{2}). There were 389 housing units at an average density of 145.6 per square mile (56.2/km^{2}). The racial makeup of the town was 65.34% White, 33.37% African American, 0.50% from other races, and 0.79% from two or more races. Hispanic or Latino of any race were 0.89% of the population.

There were 365 households, out of which 38.6% had children under the age of 18 living with them, 61.1% were married couples living together, 11.8% had a female householder with no husband present, and 23.0% were non-families. 19.5% of all households were made up of individuals, and 11.5% had someone living alone who was 65 years of age or older. The average household size was 2.76 and the average family size was 3.19.

In the town, the population was spread out, with 27.7% under the age of 18, 8.2% from 18 to 24, 28.1% from 25 to 44, 23.3% from 45 to 64, and 12.6% who were 65 years of age or older. The median age was 37 years. For every 100 females, there were 95.5 males. For every 100 females age 18 and over, there were 90.6 males.

The median income for a household in the town was $25,982, and the median income for a family was $30,673. Males had a median income of $29,554 versus $15,000 for females. The per capita income for the town was $10,839. About 17.1% of families and 19.2% of the population were below the poverty line, including 17.5% of those under age 18 and 34.7% of those age 65 or over.

== Religion ==
The majority of people who live in Leonville are Catholics. They are served by three church parishes: Saint Leo the Great, Saint Catherine and lastly Saint Jules, which is on the road to Opelousas. In the days of segregation, Whites attended St. Leo's, Blacks went to St.Catherine's and St.Jules served the mixed race population. Since the diocese placed one priest in charge of all three communities in 2005, Masses have been coordinated and there is greater movement of races between the parishes. There is also a Southern Baptist church, just outside the village, on the road to Opelousas. Burials and interments take place in the village's one cemetery, next to Saint Leo's church.

== Notable people ==
- Clifton Chenier, zydeco recording artist
