= Larto, Louisiana =

- Unincorporated community
- Location within Louisiana Location within the United States
- Coordinates: 31°22′22″N 91°54′16″W
- Country: United States
- State: Louisiana
- Parish: Catahoula
- Elevation: 49 ft (15 m)
- Time zone: UTC-6 (Central (CST))
  - Summer (DST): UTC-5 (CDT)
- Area code: 318
- GNIS feature ID: 543378

Larto is an unincorporated community in Catahoula Parish, Louisiana, United States.
