= Nesser, Louisiana =

Unincorporated community in Louisiana

- Unincorporated community
- Location within Louisiana Location within the United States
- Coordinates: 30°23′54″N 91°03′07″W
- Country: United States
- State: Louisiana
- Parish: East Baton Rouge
- Elevation: 39 ft (12 m)
- Time zone: UTC-6 (Central (CST))
  - Summer (DST): UTC-5 (CDT)
- ZIP code: 70805
- Area code: 225
- GNIS feature ID: 543515
- FIPS code: 22-53860

Nesser is an unincorporated community in East Baton Rouge Parish, Louisiana, United States. The community is located 2 miles (3.2 kilometres) northwest of Old Jefferson and 2 miles (3.2 kilometres) southeast of Westminster.

== Etymology ==
The community is named after Ludwig Nesser. A German from Trier, Germany that immigrated to Baton Rouge to work on a plantation owned by the Garig family. After getting married he purchased five acres of land and a built a small house. Then in 1883 the United States Federal Government established a post office in the region. They appointed Nesser as the first postmaster. He served as the postmaster until 1897.

== Siegen Lane ==
When the Louisiana Railway and Navigation Company built a line through the area they renamed the road Siegen Lane.
