= Gramercy Bridge =

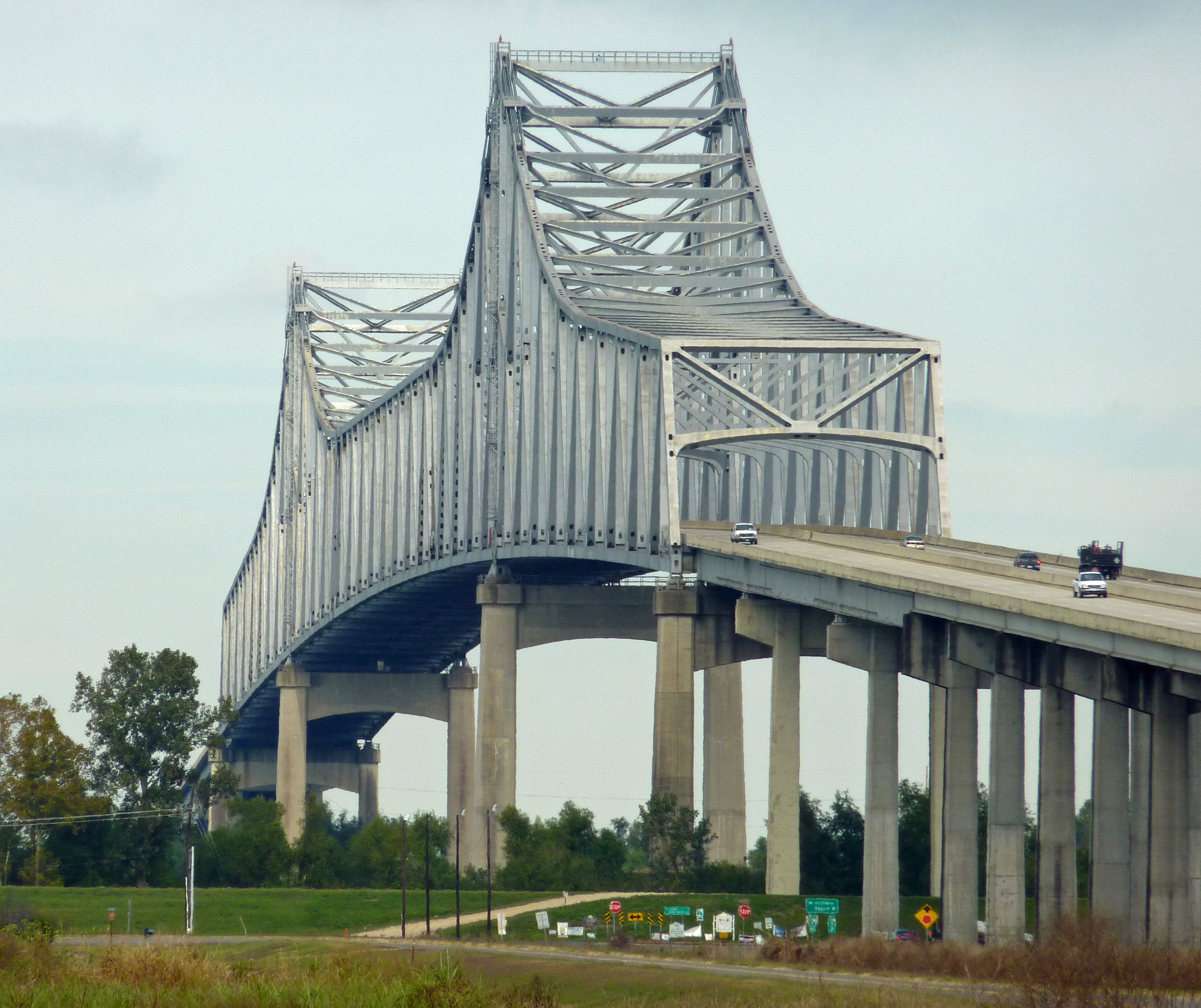
- Coordinates: 30°02′45″N 90°40′21″W
- Carries: 4 lanes of LA 3213
- Crosses: Mississippi River
- Locale: Gramercy, Louisiana and Wallace, Louisiana
- Official name: Veterans Memorial Bridge
- Maintained by: LaDOTD
- ID number: 614704340300011

Characteristics
- Design: Cantilever bridge
- Total length: 3,101 feet (945 m)
- Width: 72 feet (22 m)
- Longest span: 1,460 feet (445 m)
- Clearance below: 165 feet (50 m)

History
- Construction cost: $109.6 million
- Opened: 1995

Statistics
- Daily traffic: 9,000 (2007)

Louisiana Highway 3213
- Location: Gramercy
- Length: 3.79 mi (6.10 km)

The Gramercy Bridge (officially the Veterans Memorial Bridge), is a cantilever bridge over the Mississippi River connecting Gramercy, Louisiana in St. James Parish with St. John the Baptist Parish. It is the second newest Mississippi River bridge in Louisiana (due to the completion of the John James Audubon Bridge), one of many built to replace the ferry system following a 1976 accident that killed 78 when a ferry with an inebriated pilot and crew sank after being struck by a ship. The bridge and its approaches are Louisiana Highway 3213 (LA 3213), which runs 3.79 miles (6.10 km) from Louisiana Highway 18 on the west bank north over the bridge, past an interchange with Louisiana Highway 44, to its terminus at Louisiana Highway 641. (LA 641 continues north across U.S. Highway 61 (Airline Highway) to Interstate 10.)

LA 3213 now extends from the bridge to LA 3127 on a two lane roadway that crosses over railroad tracks about halfway down the road.

== See also ==
- List of crossings of the Lower Mississippi River
