= Gramercy, Louisiana =

Gramercy
- Town
- Location of Gramercy in St. James Parish, Louisiana.

- Location of Louisiana in the United States
- Coordinates: 30°03′14″N 90°41′21″W
- Country: United States
- State: Louisiana
- Parish: St. James

Government
  - Mayor: Steven J. Bourgeois (I)

Area
  - Total: 2.04 sq mi (5.29 km^{2})
  - Land: 2.01 sq mi (5.21 km^{2})
  - Water: 0.031 sq mi (0.08 km^{2})
- Elevation: 16 ft (4.9 m)

Population (2020)
  - Total: 2,932
  - Density: 1,457/sq mi (562.5/km^{2})
- Time zone: UTC-6 (CST)
  - Summer (DST): UTC-5 (CDT)
- Area code: 225
- FIPS code: 22-30550
- Website: www.townofgramercy.com

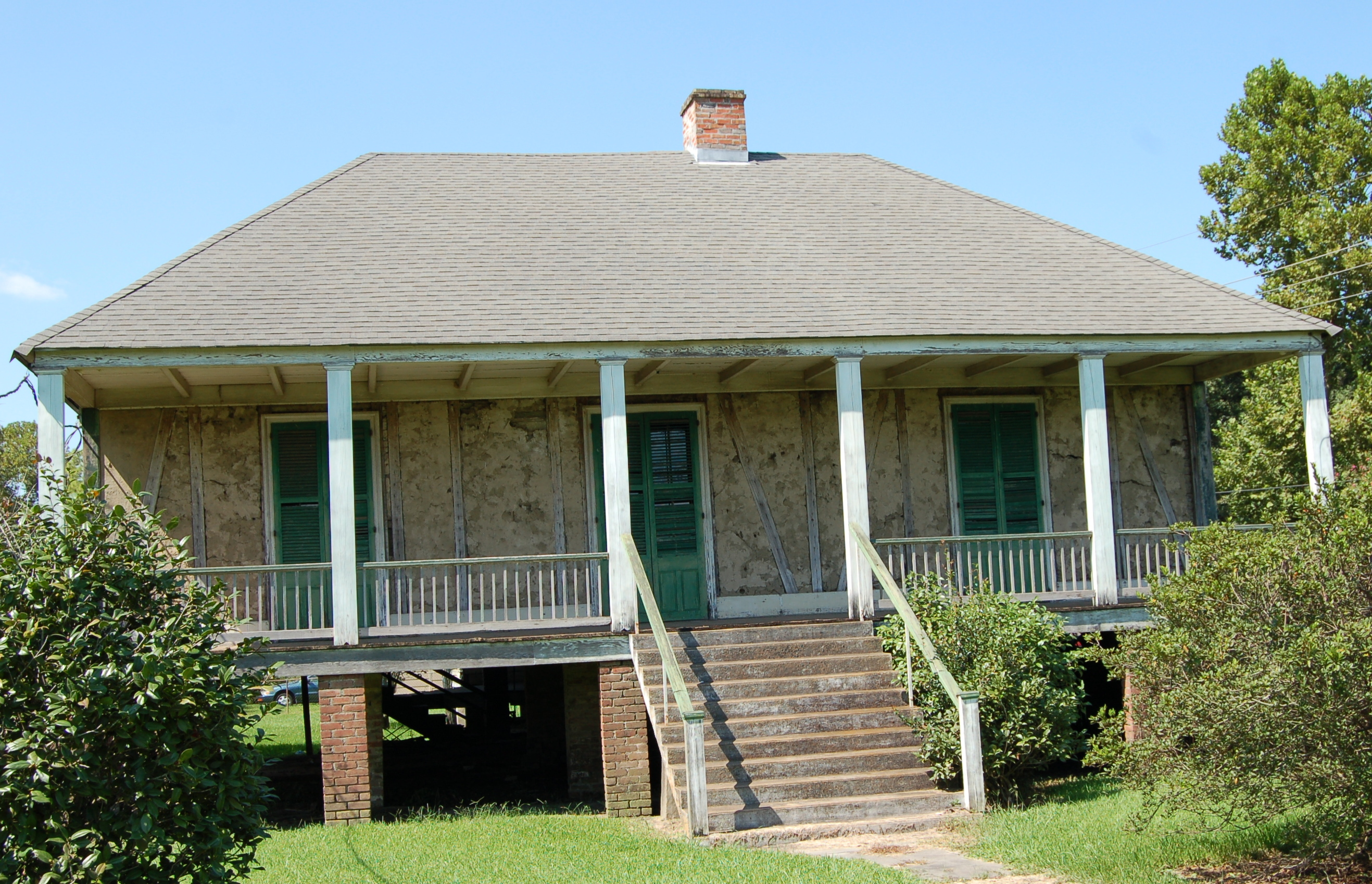
Millet House, Gramercy

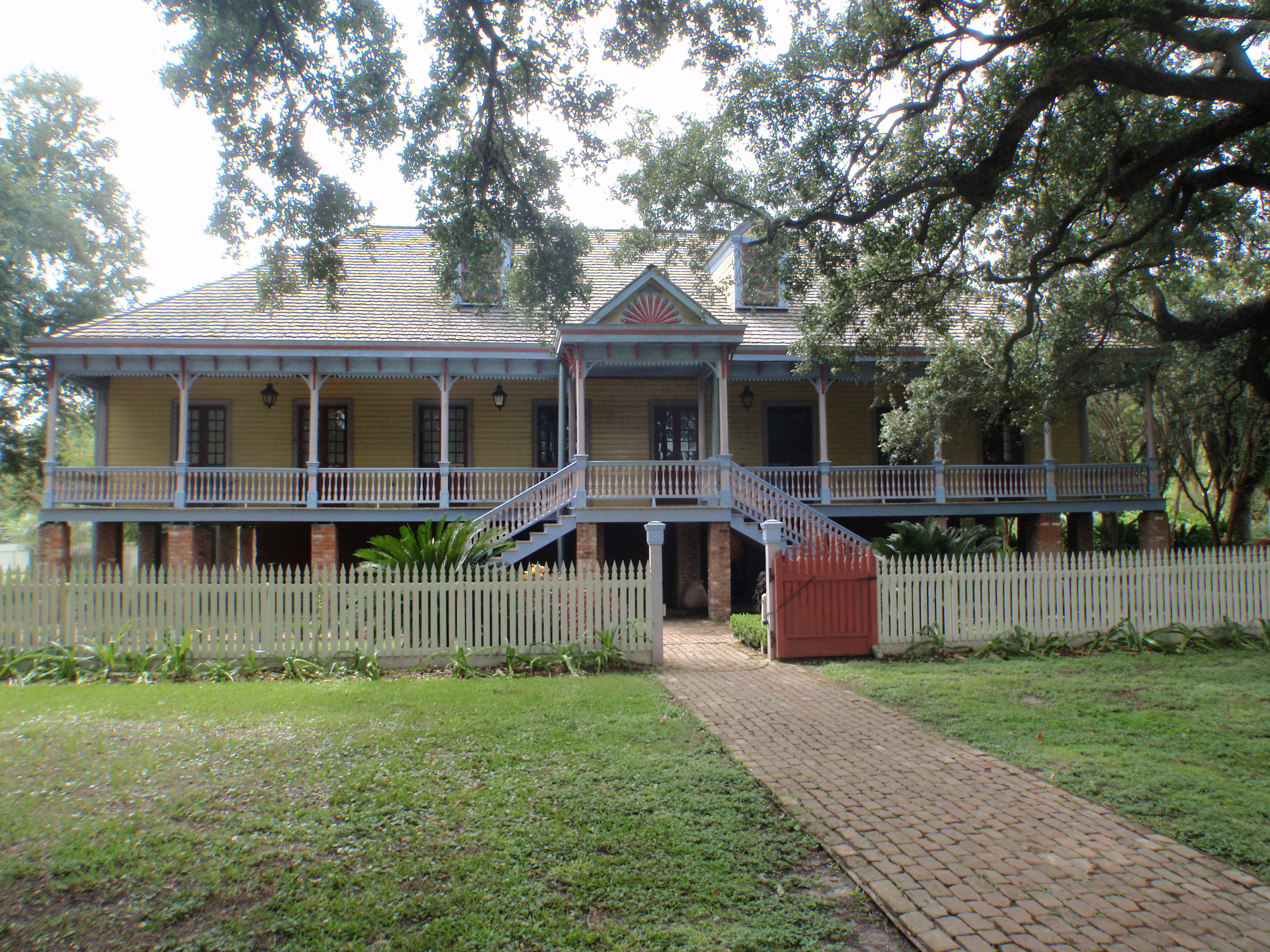
Laura Plantation house front near Vacherie

Gramercy is a town in the U.S. state of Louisiana, in St. James Parish. It is part of the New Orleans Metropolitan Area . The population was 3,613 at the time of the 2010 U.S. census and 3,188 according to the 2020 population estimates program.

== History ==
Gramercy was originally an American Indian and French settlement and trading post. In 1739, much of the area which is now known as Gramercy was sold to Joseph Delille Dupart, Commissioner of Indian Nations under Jean-Baptiste Le Moyne de Bienville. The town was incorporated in November 1947. A historic sugar mill was established in Gramercy in 1895, which became the Colonial Sugar Refinery in 1902. The National Park Service has designated the site as the Colonial Sugar National Historic District.

== Geography ==
Gramercy is located at 30°3′14″N 90°41′21″W (30.053907, -90.689154). The town of Gramercy is bordered on the west by the town of Lutcher and on the south by the Mississippi River. Gramercy is approximately 36 miles west of New Orleans

According to the United States Census Bureau, the town has a total area of 2.1 square miles (5.4 km^{2}), of which 2.1 square miles (5.4 km^{2}) is land and 0.04 square miles (0.10 km^{2}) (1.42%) is water.

== Demographics ==
Historical population
Census	Pop.	Note	%±
1950	1,184		—
1960	2,094		76.9%
1970	2,567		22.6%
1980	3,211		25.1%
1990	2,412		−24.9%
2000	3,066		27.1%
2010	3,613		17.8%
2020	2,932		−18.8%
2025 (est.)	2,689	▼	−8.3%
U.S. Decennial Census

Gramercy town, Louisiana – Racial and ethnic composition Note: the U.S. Census Bureau treats Hispanic/Latino as an ethnic category. This table excludes Latinos from the racial categories and assigns them to a separate category. Hispanics/Latinos may be of any race.
Race / Ethnicity (NH = Non-Hispanic)	Pop 2000	Pop 2010	Pop 2020	% 2000	% 2010	% 2020
White alone (NH)	1,935	1,847	1,448	63.11%	51.12%	49.39%
Black or African American alone (NH)	1,065	1,673	1,348	34.74%	46.31%	45.98%
Native American or Alaska Native alone (NH)	14	20	7	0.46%	0.55%	0.24%
Asian alone (NH)	3	16	12	0.10%	0.44%	0.41%
Native Hawaiian or Pacific Islander alone (NH)	0	0	0	0.00%	0.00%	0.00%
Other race alone (NH)	0	0	7	0.00%	0.00%	0.24%
Mixed race or Multiracial (NH)	27	21	64	0.88%	0.58%	2.18%
Hispanic or Latino (any race)	22	36	46	0.72%	1.00%	1.57%
Total	3,066	3,613	2,932	100.00%	100.00%	100.00%

As of the 2020 United States census, there were 2,932 people, 1,177 households, and 954 families residing in the town. The 2019 American Community Survey determined the racial and ethnic makeup of the town was 46.8% non-Hispanic white, 52.1% Black and African American, and 1,1% Asian. Of the population, males had a median income of $45,071 versus $38,306 for females. The median household income was $57,750, and 17.7% of the population lived at or below the poverty line.

At the 2000 United States census, there were 3,066 people, 1,090 households, and 833 families residing in the town. The population density was 1,477.6 inhabitants per square mile (570.5/km^{2}). There were 1,163 housing units at an average density of 560.5 per square mile (216.4/km^{2}). The racial makeup of the town was 63.60% White, 34.83% African American, 0.46% Native American, 0.10% Asian, and 1.01% from two or more races. Hispanics or Latin Americans of any race were 0.72% of the population.

In 2000, there were 1,090 households, out of which 35.0% had children under the age of 18 living with them, 53.4% were married couples living together, 18.1% had a female householder with no husband present, and 23.5% were non-families. 20.8% of all households were made up of individuals, and 7.9% had someone living alone who was 65 years of age or older. The average household size was 2.81 and the average family size was 3.27. In the town, the population was spread out, with 28.6% under the age of 18, 7.5% from 18 to 24, 30.0% from 25 to 44, 21.1% from 45 to 64, and 12.7% who were 65 years of age or older. The median age was 35 years. For every 100 females, there were 95.3 males. For every 100 females age 18 and over, there were 89.4 males at the 2000 U.S. census.

In 2000, the median income for a household in the town was $33,824, and the median income for a family was $39,350. Males had a median income of $39,013 versus $22,750 for females. The per capita income for the town was $14,040. About 17.4% of families and 21.3% of the population were below the poverty line, including 29.2% of those under age 18 and 10.0% of those age 65 or over.

== Industry ==
Gramercy was the home of Zapp's Potato Chips and Louisiana Sugar Refining, LLC (LSR).

LSR operates a state-of-the-art sugar refinery with a capacity of 3,100 tons per day. The refinery employs about 150 people. LSR is located in the Colonial Sugars National Historic District.

== See also ==
- Gramercy Bridge
