= Louisiana Highway 611 =

State highway in Louisiana, United States

Louisiana Highway 611

- Routes of the three current sections of LA 611 in red

Route information
- Maintained by Louisiana DOTD
- Existed: 1955 renumbering–present

Location
- Country: United States
- State: Louisiana
- Parishes: Jefferson, Orleans

Highway system
- Louisiana State Highway System; Interstate; US; State; Scenic
← LA 610	→ LA 612

Louisiana Highway 611 (LA 611) is a collection of three current and 10 former state-maintained streets in Jefferson, Metairie, and New Orleans. All 13 routes were established with the 1955 Louisiana Highway renumbering.

== Current routes ==
=== Louisiana Highway 611-1 ===
Louisiana Highway 611-1
- Location: Jefferson
- Length: 2.5 mi (4.0 km)
- Existed: 1955–present

From the west, LA 611-1 begins on River Road at an intersection with Jefferson Heights Avenue in Jefferson. LA 611-1 continues eastward, running parallel to the Mississippi River, and intersects LA 611-3 (Shrewsbury Road). The route ends at the Jefferson Parish/Orleans Parish Line adjacent to Monticello Avenue. LA 611-1 is known locally as River Road and is an undivided, two-lane highway for its entire length.

LA 611-1 formerly intersected five other routes in the LA 611 group that have since been deleted from the state highway system: LA 611-2 (Central Avenue), LA 611-4 (Labarre Road), LA 611-5 (Brooklyn Avenue), LA 611-7 (Dakin Street), and LA 611-8 (Monticello Avenue).

LA 611-1 comprised most of State Routes 459 and 1232 in the pre-1955 Louisiana highway system.

Parish	Location	mi	km	Destinations	Notes
Jefferson	Jefferson	0.0	0.0	Begin state maintenance at Jefferson Heights Avenue	Western terminus
Jefferson	Jefferson	0.8	1.3	LA 611-3 (Shrewsbury Road)	Southern terminus of LA 611-3
Jefferson–Orleans parish line	Jefferson–New Orleans line	2.5	4.0	End state maintenance at Upper Protection Levee	Eastern terminus
1.000 mi = 1.609 km; 1.000 km = 0.621 mi

=== Louisiana Highway 611-3 ===
Louisiana Highway 611-3
- Location: Jefferson
- Length: 0.34 mi (550 m)
- Existed: 1955–present

From the south, LA 611-3 begins at an intersection with LA 611-1 (River Road) in Jefferson and, after passing the Jefferson Parish Streets Department facility, terminates at an intersection with U.S. 90 (Jefferson Highway). The route is known locally as Shrewsbury Road and is an undivided, two-lane highway for its entire length.

LA 611-3 originally continued along Shrewsbury Road past U.S. 90 and across the railroad tracks to U.S. 61 (Airline Highway, now Airline Drive). The route was severed in June 1957 when the railroad crossing on Shrewsbury Road was closed following completion of the parallel Causeway Boulevard (LA 3046) overpass. The extension of the Earhart Expressway (LA 3139) from Deckbar Avenue to Cleary Avenue in 1984 created a second barrier. In 2002, the segment of LA 611-3 north of the railroad tracks was given a separate route number, LA 3261, before being deleted altogether in 2010. LA 611-3 was then shortened to its present terminus at U.S. 90.

In its original form, the route of LA 611-3 included what was once a small piece of the Jefferson Highway (State Route 1 in the pre-1955 Louisiana highway system) and U.S. 61 prior to the direct extension of Jefferson Highway into South Claiborne Avenue in 1928. Shrewsbury Road then became part of State Route 454 until the 1955 Louisiana Highway renumbering.

The entire highway is in Jefferson, Jefferson Parish.

mi	km	Destinations	Notes
0.00	0.00	LA 611-1 (River Road)	Southern terminus
0.34	0.55	US 90 (Jefferson Highway)	Northern terminus
1.000 mi = 1.609 km; 1.000 km = 0.621 mi

=== Louisiana Highway 611-9 ===
Louisiana Highway 611-9
- Location: Metairie, New Orleans
- Length: 3.6 mi (5.8 km)
- Existed: 1955–present

From the west, LA 611-9 begins at the intersection of U.S. 61 (Airline Drive) and Severn Avenue. After briefly heading north on Severn Avenue, LA 611-9 immediately turns eastward onto Metairie Road, which is the local name for the remainder of its route. The first block of Metairie Road handles eastbound traffic only, and westbound traffic is diverted onto parallel Johnson Street to reach Severn Avenue. Running east atop the Metairie Ridge, LA 611-9 passes under Causeway Boulevard and intersects Bonnabel Boulevard. It enters New Orleans/Orleans Parish before coming to an end at a diamond interchange (Exit 231A) with I-10 (the Pontchartrain Expressway) at Pontchartrain Boulevard.

With the exception of the block-long divided, four-lane section near Severn Avenue (configured in February 1957), LA 611-9 is an undivided, two-lane highway in Jefferson Parish. It divides and expands to four lanes when it enters New Orleans and remains in that capacity until its terminus at I-10.

In December 1916, the route of today's LA 611-9 was designated as the New Orleans entrance of the Jefferson Highway. This became State Route 1 in 1921 and U.S. 61 in 1926. These highways were moved off of the route in 1928-1929 when Jefferson Highway was extended along the Orleans-Kenner interurban streetcar right-of-way from Shrewsbury Road to the Protection Levee at South Claiborne Avenue to provide a more direct entrance into New Orleans. The former route along Shrewsbury Road and Metairie Road became State Route 454 until the 1955 Louisiana Highway renumbering. (Today's LA 611-9 briefly carried U.S. 61 again from 1933 to 1935.)

Parish	Location	mi	km	Destinations	Notes
Jefferson	Metairie	0.0	0.0	US 61 (Airline Drive)	Western terminus
Jefferson–Orleans parish line	Metairie–New Orleans line	2.9	4.7	Bridge over 17th Street Canal	
Orleans	New Orleans	3.6	5.8	I-10 (Pontchartrain Expressway) – Baton Rouge, New Orleans/ Pontchartrain Boulevard	Eastern terminus; Diamond interchange; Exit 231A (I-10)
1.000 mi = 1.609 km; 1.000 km = 0.621 mi

== Former routes ==
=== Louisiana Highway 611-2 ===
Louisiana Highway 611-2
- Location: Jefferson
- Length: 0.52 mi (840 m)
- Existed: 1955–2010

From the south, LA 611-2 began at an intersection with LA 611-1 (River Road) in Jefferson. LA 611-2 continued along Central Avenue northward to a terminus at U.S. 90/LA 48 (Jefferson Highway). LA 48 eastbound traversed the remainder of Central Avenue northward to U.S. 61 (Airline Drive). LA 611-2 was an undivided, two-lane highway for its entire length.

Central Avenue became a local road in 2010, eliminating LA 611-2 and truncating the eastern terminus of LA 48.

LA 611-2 was known as State Route 1234 in the pre-1955 Louisiana highway system.

The entire highway was in Jefferson, Jefferson Parish.

mi	km	Destinations	Notes
0.00	0.00	LA 611-1 (River Road)	Southern terminus
0.52	0.84	US 90 / LA 48 (Jefferson Highway, Central Avenue)	Northern terminus
1.000 mi = 1.609 km; 1.000 km = 0.621 mi

=== Louisiana Highway 611-4 ===
Louisiana Highway 611-4
- Location: Jefferson
- Length: 0.59 mi (950 m)
- Existed: 1955–2010

From the south, LA 611-4 began at an intersection with LA 611-1 (River Road) in Jefferson. After an intersection with U.S. 90 (Jefferson Highway), LA 611-4 continued northward to a dead end at the railroad tracks south of LA 3139 (Earhart Expressway). LA 611-4 followed Labarre Road and was an undivided, two-lane highway for its entire length.

LA 611-4 originally continued along Labarre Road across the railroad tracks to U.S. 61 (Airline Highway, now Airline Drive). The route was severed in June 1957 when the railroad crossing on Labarre Road was closed following completion of the parallel Causeway Boulevard (LA 3046) overpass. The extension of the Earhart Expressway (LA 3139) from Deckbar Avenue to Cleary Avenue in 1984 created a second barrier. In 2002, the segment of LA 611-4 north of the railroad tracks was given a separate route number, LA 3262, before being deleted altogether in 2010.

LA 611-4 was known as State Route 1231 in the pre-1955 Louisiana highway system.

The entire highway was in Jefferson, Jefferson Parish.

mi	km	Destinations	Notes
0.00	0.00	LA 611-1 (River Road)	Southern terminus
0.20	0.32	US 90 (Jefferson Highway)	
0.59	0.95	Dead end at New Orleans Public Belt Railroad tracks south of LA 3139 (Earhart Expressway)	Northern terminus
1.000 mi = 1.609 km; 1.000 km = 0.621 mi

=== Louisiana Highway 611-5 ===
Louisiana Highway 611-5
- Location: Jefferson
- Length: 0.55 mi (890 m)
- Existed: 1955–2010

From the south, LA 611-5 began at an intersection with LA 611-1 (River Road) in Jefferson. After an intersection with former LA 611-6 (Cicero Street), it continued northward to a terminus at U.S. 90 (Jefferson Highway). LA 611-5 followed Brooklyn Avenue and was an undivided, two-lane highway for its entire length. The route was deleted in 2010.

LA 611-5 was known as State Route 1233 in the pre-1955 Louisiana highway system.

The entire highway was in Jefferson, Jefferson Parish.

mi	km	Destinations	Notes
0.00	0.00	LA 611-1 (River Road)	Southern terminus
0.30	0.48	LA 611-6 (Cicero Street)	Eastern terminus of LA 611-6
0.55	0.89	US 90 (Jefferson Highway)	Northern terminus
1.000 mi = 1.609 km; 1.000 km = 0.621 mi

=== Louisiana Highway 611-6 ===
Louisiana Highway 611-6
- Location: Jefferson
- Length: 0.05 mi (80 m)
- Existed: 1955–2010

From the west, LA 611-6 began at an intersection with U.S. 90 (Jefferson Highway) in Jefferson. It continued eastward to a terminus at former LA 611-5 (Brooklyn Avenue). LA 611-6 followed Cicero Street and was an undivided, two-lane highway for its entire length. The route was deleted in 2010.

LA 611-6 was known first as State Route 1243D and later as State Route 1795 in the pre-1955 Louisiana highway system.

The entire highway was in Jefferson, Jefferson Parish.

mi	km	Destinations	Notes
0.00	0.00	US 90 (Jefferson Highway)	Western terminus
0.55	0.89	LA 611-5 (Brooklyn Avenue)	Eastern terminus
1.000 mi = 1.609 km; 1.000 km = 0.621 mi

=== Louisiana Highway 611-7 ===
Louisiana Highway 611-7
- Location: Jefferson
- Length: 0.80 mi (1,290 m)
- Existed: 1955–1974

From the south, LA 611-7 began at an intersection with LA 611-1 (River Road) in Jefferson. It continued northward to a terminus at U.S. 90 (Jefferson Highway). LA 611-7 followed Dakin Street and was an undivided, two-lane highway for its entire length. The route was deleted in 1974.

LA 611-7 was known as State Route 1251 in the pre-1955 Louisiana highway system.

The entire highway was in Jefferson, Jefferson Parish.

mi	km	Destinations	Notes
0.00	0.00	LA 611-1 (River Road)	Southern terminus
0.80	1.29	US 90 (Jefferson Highway)	Northern terminus
1.000 mi = 1.609 km; 1.000 km = 0.621 mi

=== Louisiana Highway 611-8 ===
Louisiana Highway 611-8
- Location: Jefferson
- Length: 0.82 mi (1,320 m)
- Existed: 1955–2010

From the south, LA 611-8 began at an intersection with LA 611-1 (River Road) in Jefferson. It continued northward to a terminus at U.S. 90 (Jefferson Highway). LA 611-8 followed Monticello Avenue, running alongside the Jefferson Parish/Orleans Parish Line, and was an undivided, two-lane highway for its entire length. The route was deleted in 2010.

LA 611-8 was known as State Route 458 in the pre-1955 Louisiana highway system.

The entire highway was in Jefferson, Jefferson Parish.

mi	km	Destinations	Notes
0.00	0.00	LA 611-1 (River Road)	Southern terminus
0.82	1.32	US 90 (Jefferson Highway)	Northern terminus
1.000 mi = 1.609 km; 1.000 km = 0.621 mi

=== Louisiana Highway 611-10 ===
Louisiana Highway 611-10
- Location: Metairie
- Length: 0.50 mi (800 m)
- Existed: 1955–1972

From the south, LA 611-10 began at an intersection with U.S. 61 (Airline Highway, now Airline Drive) in Metairie. It continued northward to a terminus at West Metairie Avenue. LA 611-10 followed Clearview Parkway and was a divided, six-lane highway for its entire length.

LA 611-10 formerly extended north to Veterans Highway (now Veterans Memorial Boulevard) and was shortened before being renumbered to LA 3152 in 1972. LA 3152 has since been extended south over South Clearview Parkway to U.S. 90/LA 48 (Jefferson Highway) at the Huey P. Long Bridge and north to I-10 over most of its former route.

LA 611-10 was known as State Route 1245 in the pre-1955 Louisiana highway system.

The entire highway was in Metairie, Jefferson Parish.

mi	km	Destinations	Notes
0.00	0.00	US 61 (Airline Highway)	Southern terminus
0.50	0.80	End state maintenance at West Metairie Avenue	Northern terminus
1.000 mi = 1.609 km; 1.000 km = 0.621 mi

=== Louisiana Highway 611-11 ===
Louisiana Highway 611-11
- Location: Metairie
- Length: 0.50 mi (800 m)
- Existed: 1955–1972

From the south, LA 611-11 began at an intersection with U.S. 61 (Airline Highway, now Airline Drive) in Metairie. It continued northward to a terminus at West Metairie Avenue. LA 611-11 followed Transcontinental Drive and was a divided, four-lane highway for its entire length.

LA 611-11 formerly extended north to Veterans Highway (now Veterans Memorial Boulevard) and was shortened before being renumbered to LA 3153 in 1972. The route was deleted altogether in the 1980s.

LA 611-11 was known as State Route 1246 in the pre-1955 Louisiana highway system.

The entire highway was in Metairie, Jefferson Parish.

mi	km	Destinations	Notes
0.00	0.00	US 61 (Airline Highway)	Southern terminus
0.50	0.80	End state maintenance at West Metairie Avenue	Northern terminus
1.000 mi = 1.609 km; 1.000 km = 0.621 mi

=== Louisiana Highway 611-12 ===
Louisiana Highway 611-12
- Location: Harahan, Metairie
- Length: 3.0 mi (4.8 km)
- Existed: 1955–1972

From the south, LA 611-12 began at an intersection with LA 48 (Jefferson Highway) in Harahan. It continued northward to a terminus at U.S. 61 (Airline Highway, now Airline Drive) in Metairie. LA 611-12 followed Hickory Avenue and was an undivided, two-lane highway for its entire length.

LA 611-12 was renumbered to LA 3154 in 1972, and much of the route has been shifted onto a parallel divided, four-lane alignment known as Dickory Avenue.

The entire highway was in Jefferson Parish.

Location	mi	km	Destinations	Notes
Harahan	0.0	0.0	LA 48 (Jefferson Highway)	Southern terminus
Metairie	3.0	4.8	US 61 (Airline Highway)	Northern terminus
1.000 mi = 1.609 km; 1.000 km = 0.621 mi

=== Louisiana Highway 611-13 ===
Louisiana Highway 611-13
- Location: Metairie
- Length: 0.30 mi (480 m)
- Existed: 1955–1972

From the south, LA 611-13 began on the south side of the Illinois Central Railroad tracks at Russell Street in River Ridge. It continued northward to a terminus at U.S. 61 (Airline Highway, now Airline Drive) in Metairie. LA 611-13 followed Little Farms Avenue and was an undivided, two-lane highway for its entire length.

The route originally covered all of Little Farms Avenue from LA 48 (Jefferson Highway) to U.S. 61 but was shortened before being renumbered to LA 3155 in 1972.

LA 611-13 was known as State Route 2220 in the pre-1955 Louisiana highway system.

The entire highway was in Jefferson Parish.

Location	mi	km	Destinations	Notes
River Ridge	0.00	0.00	Begin state maintenance at Russell Street	Southern terminus
Metairie	0.30	0.48	US 61 (Airline Highway)	Northern terminus
1.000 mi = 1.609 km; 1.000 km = 0.621 mi
