= Louisiana Highway 3152 =

State highway in Louisiana, United States

Louisiana Highway 3152
- (South) Clearview Parkway

Route information
- Maintained by Louisiana DOTD
- Length: 3.8 mi (6.1 km)
- Existed: 1972–present

Major junctions
- South end: US 90 / LA 48 in Elmwood
- US 61 in Metairie
- North end: I-10 in Metairie

Location
- Country: United States
- State: Louisiana
- Parishes: Jefferson

Highway system
- Louisiana State Highway System; Interstate; US; State; Scenic
← LA 3151	→ LA 3153

Louisiana Highway 3152 (LA 3152) is a state highway in Louisiana that serves Jefferson Parish. LA 3152 spans 3.8 miles (6.1 km) in a south to north direction and is known locally as South Clearview Parkway and Clearview Parkway.

== Route description ==
LA 3152 begins at an interchange with U.S. 90 and LA 48 (Jefferson Highway) at the east bank base of the Huey P. Long Bridge in Elmwood. LA 3152 continues northward along South Clearview Parkway, intersecting with LA 3139 (Earhart Expressway) via an interchange. At U.S. 61 (Airline Drive), the local name changes to Clearview Parkway, and LA 3152 continues to an interchange with I-10. Clearview Parkway continues northward across Veterans Memorial Boulevard and eventually ends at Lake Pontchartrain.

LA 3152 is a divided, six-lane highway for its entire length.

== History ==
Clearview Parkway began as a main thoroughfare through the Bridgedale subdivision which opened in 1925 during construction of the Airline Highway between Shrewsbury (Metairie) and Kenner. In 1930, it was designated as State Route 1245 in the pre-1955 Louisiana Highway system. The other main thoroughfare, Transcontinental Drive (State Route 1246), was intended to be extended south to Jefferson Highway (State Route 1) to connect with the Huey P. Long Bridge then in the planning stages. These plans never came to fruition, and the Bridgedale area would not be not directly connected to the bridge for almost fifty years.

The route became LA 611-10 in the 1955 Louisiana Highway renumbering and assumed its present number in 1972. The extension of Clearview Parkway, complete with railroad overpass, south from Airline Highway to the Huey P. Long Bridge at Jefferson Highway, opened in June 1973 and was designated as South Clearview Parkway. The Earhart Expressway (LA 3139) interchange was partially completed in the 1970s as part of the Clearview Parkway-Dickory Avenue section of the expressway. The overpass was completed in June 1986 along with the final link of the expressway between Cleary Avenue and Clearview Parkway.

LA 3152 originally included only the part of Clearview Parkway/South Clearview Parkway between the Earhart Expressway and West Metairie Avenue. In 2010, the route was extended on both the northern and southern ends to its present termini at U.S. 90/LA 48 and I-10.

== Major intersections ==
The entire highway is in Jefferson Parish.

Location	mi	km	Destinations	Notes
Elmwood	0.0	0.0	US 90 (Jefferson Highway, Huey P. Long Bridge) – New Orleans, Westbank LA 48 west (Jefferson Highway)	Interchange; Huey P. Long Bridge across Mississippi River on the southeast
Elmwood	1.2	1.9	LA 3139 (Earhart Expressway) – Harahan, New Orleans	Interchange
Metairie	1.8	2.9	US 61 (Airline Drive) – Kenner, New Orleans	
Metairie	3.8	6.1	I-10 – Baton Rouge, New Orleans	Exit 226 (I-10)
1.000 mi = 1.609 km; 1.000 km = 0.621 mi
