= Louisiana Highway 48 =

State highway in Louisiana, United States

Louisiana Highway 48

Route information
- Maintained by Louisiana DOTD
- Length: 20.9 mi (33.6 km)
- Existed: 1955 renumbering–present

Major junctions
- West end: US 61 in Norco
- I-310 in Destrehan; LA 3154 in Harahan
- East end: US 90 / LA 3152 in Elmwood

Location
- Country: United States
- State: Louisiana
- Parishes: St. Charles, Jefferson

Highway system
- Louisiana State Highway System; Interstate; US; State; Scenic
← LA 47	→ I-49

Louisiana Highway 48 (LA 48) is a state highway in Louisiana that serves St. Charles and Jefferson Parishes. It runs from west to east, parallel to the east bank of the Mississippi River, from Norco to Jefferson. It spans a total of 20.9 miles (33.6 km). Throughout its run, LA 48 is known as Apple Street, River Road, 3rd Street, Reverend Richard Wilson Drive, and Jefferson Highway.

== Route description ==
From the west, LA 48 begins at an intersection with US 61 (Airline Highway) in Norco. Then known as Apple Street, it runs southward as an undivided two-lane highway. When it reaches the Mississippi River, it turns eastward to follow and run parallel to it as River Road. It intersects LA 627, dividing and expanding to four lanes briefly at the interchange with I-310, followed by intersections at LA 626 and LA 50 as it continues downriver through the St. Charles Parish communities of New Sarpy, Destrehan, St. Rose, and Almedia.

As it enters Jefferson Parish and the city of Kenner, it becomes known as 3rd Street and then Reverend Richard Wilson Drive. The road becomes a divided four-lane street at Williams Boulevard, and upon crossing from Kenner into River Ridge at Filmore Street, it becomes known as Jefferson Highway. After passing through Harahan, LA 48 shortly merges with US 90 at the east bank base of the Huey P. Long Bridge and LA 3152 (South Clearview Parkway) in Elmwood, becoming a six-lane divided highway through the concurrency.

LA 48 ends at Central Avenue in Jefferson, and US 90 continues along Jefferson Highway toward New Orleans.

== History ==
Almost all of LA 48 follows the historic Jefferson Highway auto trail designated in 1916 and was once the main traffic route from New Orleans to Baton Rouge and points north in the state. In 1921, this became State Route 1 in the pre-1955 Louisiana highway system and the original alignment of US 61 in 1926. US 61 was removed from the route of today's LA 48 in 1933, 1935, and 1940 as various sections of the Airline Highway were completed between the Bonnet Carré Spillway and New Orleans.

LA 48 originally turned northward from its present eastern terminus and followed Central Avenue to US 61 (Airline Highway). Central Avenue became a local road in 2010, truncating the route of LA 48 and eliminating altogether LA 611-2 which included the remainder of Central Avenue south of US 90.

== Major intersections ==
Parish	Location	mi	km	Destinations	Notes
St. Charles	Norco	0.0	0.0	US 61 (Airline Highway) – Baton Rouge, New Orleans	Western terminus
St. Charles	Norco	2.2	3.5	LA 627 (Prospect Avenue)	Southern terminus of LA 627
St. Charles	Destrehan	6.1	9.8	I-310 – Boutte, New Orleans	Exit 6 (I-310); I-310 passes overhead via Luling Bridge across Mississippi River
St. Charles	St. Rose	9.7	15.6	LA 626 (St. Rose Avenue)	Southern terminus of LA 626
St. Charles	St. Rose	11.0	17.7	LA 50 (Almedia Road)	Southern terminus of LA 50
Jefferson	Harahan	19.7	31.7	LA 3154 north (Hickory Avenue)	Southern terminus of LA 3154
Jefferson	Elmwood	20.9	33.6	US 90 – New Orleans, Gretna LA 3152 north (South Clearview Parkway)	Eastern terminus; Interchange; Huey P. Long Bridge across Mississippi River on the southeast; Junction includes incorrect and incomplete signage
1.000 mi = 1.609 km; 1.000 km = 0.621 mi
