= U.S. Route 90 Business (New Orleans) =

Highway in New Orleans, Louisiana

U.S. Highway 90 Business
- Non-freeway segment of US 90 Bus. in blue; freeway portion (unsigned I-910) in red

Route information
- Auxiliary route of US 90
- Maintained by Louisiana DOTD
- Length: 14.250 mi (22.933 km) I-910: 9.70 miles (15.61 km)
- Existed: 1960–present
- Tourist routes: National Scenic Byway: Great River Road

Major junctions
- West end: Future I-49 / US 90 in Avondale
- LA 45 in Marrero; LA 18 / LA 23 in Gretna
- East end: I-10 / US 90 in New Orleans

Location
- Country: United States
- State: Louisiana
- Parishes: Jefferson, Orleans

Highway system
- United States Numbered Highway System; List; Special; Divided; Louisiana State Highway System; Interstate; US; State; Scenic
← LA 89	→ LA 91
← LA 909	I-910	→ LA 910

U.S. Highway 90 Business (US 90 Bus.) is a business route of U.S. Highway 90 located in and near New Orleans, Louisiana. It runs 14.25 miles (22.93 km) in a general east–west direction from US 90 in Avondale to a junction with Interstate 10 (I-10) and US 90 in the New Orleans Central Business District.

Unlike a typical business route, US 90 Bus. is built to a higher standard than the segment of US 90 that it parallels. More than half of the route is an elevated freeway with frontage roads while mainline US 90 is a divided six-lane surface highway. It is also the only business route of a U.S. Highway in Louisiana that is not derived from a former alignment of its parent route. US 90 Bus. was newly constructed between 1954 and 1960 while the parallel section of US 90 has remained largely unchanged since 1936.

US 90 Bus. initially heads eastward along the Westbank Expressway, serving a number of suburban communities in Jefferson Parish located on the west bank of the Mississippi River. These include Westwego, Marrero, Harvey, and Gretna, the parish seat. After transitioning from a surface route to an elevated freeway in Marrero, US 90 Bus. traverses a high-level bridge over the Harvey Canal, a link in the Gulf Intracoastal Waterway, while the frontage roads pass through the Harvey Tunnel. Shortly after entering an area of New Orleans known as Algiers, US 90 Bus. curves due west onto the Crescent City Connection, a twin-span cantilever bridge across the Mississippi River. The highway continues alongside the downtown area as part of the elevated Pontchartrain Expressway to a complex interchange with I-10 and mainline US 90 adjacent to the Superdome.

The entirety of US 90 Bus. is intended to become part of I-49 once that highway is extended along the present US 90 corridor from Lafayette to New Orleans. In the meantime, the route carries the designation of Future I-49, as approved by the American Association of State Highway and Transportation Officials in 1999. While the Federal Highway Administration approved the existing freeway portion of US 90 Bus. to be signed as Interstate 910 in the interim, the Louisiana Department of Transportation and Development did not follow through with an application to the AASHTO's U.S. Route Numbering Committee, and the designation remains unused. This route exit 6A from the nearby west in Harvey in Gretna to New Orleans district.

== Route description ==
=== Westwego to Harvey Canal ===
From the west, US 90 Bus. begins at a modified trumpet interchange with US 90 in a sparsely developed area of Jefferson Parish surrounded by the suburban city of Westwego, Bayou Segnette State Park, and an industrial area formerly known as Avondale Shipyard. Mainline US 90 connects with Boutte to the west and the Huey P. Long Bridge across the Mississippi River to the east (geographically north). Due to the proximity of the BNSF/Union Pacific Railroad overpass on eastbound US 90, the ramp from westbound US 90 Bus. travels in an indirect fashion and intersects an eastbound ramp at grade at a four-way stop. As a result, a significant amount of local traffic circumvents this movement by turning onto Nine Mile Point Road toward a signalized intersection with US 90 that features a protected no-stop turn lane.

US 90 Bus. heads southeast along the Westbank Expressway as a divided four-lane highway and intersects Segnette Boulevard, the entrance to the Alario Center and Bayou Segnette State Park. Soon afterward, US 90 Bus. widens to six lanes, and the median width increases from 41 feet (12 m) to 206 feet (63 m). Upon entering the city of Westwego, US 90 Bus. becomes a developed commercial corridor, and an intersection with LA 18 Spur (Louisiana Street) provides a route for truck traffic to the industrial facilities along the riverfront. The highway crosses from Westwego into the unincorporated community of Marrero immediately past Victory Drive and curves due east, maintaining a parallel trajectory to the Mississippi River. At Carmadelle Street, several blocks past a signalized intersection with Westwood Drive, a ramp leads through traffic onto an elevated six-lane freeway, which begins in the median. The ground-level portion of the Westbank Expressway continues straight ahead as frontage roads serving local businesses and maintains a six-lane capacity.

After a short distance, the first in a series of tight diamond interchanges, exit 4A, connects with Ames Boulevard. As it is located near the west end of the freeway, the interchange consists only of an eastbound entrance and westbound exit with the remaining movements accessed from the frontage roads. The following exit (4B) connects with LA 45 (Barataria Boulevard) and leads to Jean Lafitte National Historical Park and Preserve as well as several communities situated alongside Bayou Barataria. This exit also serves the nearby West Jefferson Medical Center. US 90 Bus. proceeds through the neighboring unincorporated community of Harvey, which is bisected by the Harvey Canal, a link in the Gulf Intracoastal Waterway. An industrial corridor flanks the canal and stretches from the Mississippi River southward into Plaquemines Parish near Belle Chasse. A half-diamond interchange at exit 5 (MacArthur Avenue) serves the industrial area on the west bank of the canal. The highway elevates to a height of 95 feet (29 m) to cross the canal while the frontage roads pass underneath it via the Harvey Tunnel. Direct access to the facilities on the east side of the canal, situated along LA 3017 (Peters Road), is limited to a westbound exit ramp.

=== Harvey Canal to Mississippi River ===
Harvey Tunnel
- Interactive map of Harvey Tunnel

Overview
- Location: Harvey
- Coordinates: 29°53′54″N 90°04′44″W
- Status: Open
- Route: US 90 Bus. / Future I-49 (Frontage Roads)

Operation
- Work began: June 28, 1954; 72 years ago
- Opened: September 5, 1957; 69 years ago
- Owner: La DOTD
- Traffic: Automotive

Technical
- Length: 1,079.7 feet (329.1 m)
- No. of lanes: 4
- Tunnel clearance: 13 feet (4.0 m)
- Width: 43.9 feet (13.4 m)

East of the Harvey Canal, US 90 Bus. heads northwest, returning to its prior elevation and connecting to Manhattan Boulevard via exit 6. It then enters the city of Gretna, the seat of Jefferson Parish government. Two interchanges serve Gretna: exit 7 to LA 18/LA 23 (Lafayette Street) and exit 8 to Stumpf Boulevard. Between these two exits, the expressway frontage roads run concurrent with LA 23, which continues northwest onto Stumpf Boulevard. While passing alongside the Oakwood Center shopping mall, US 90 Bus. enters into its final interchange on the west bank: exit 9 to Terry Parkway and General de Gaulle Drive. These are parallel divided thoroughfares, the former serving the mall and adjacent neighborhood of Terrytown. The first portion of the exit is a tight half-diamond interchange consisting of an eastbound exit and westbound entrance that utilize the frontage roads to connect with both thoroughfares.

Immediately after crossing Terry Parkway, US 90 Bus. enters Orleans Parish and the city of New Orleans, which are co-extensive. All remaining movements on exit 9 are provided via a partial cloverleaf interchange at General de Gaulle Drive with flyover ramps connecting to Terry Parkway, and the US 90 Bus. frontage roads are discontinued at this point. General de Gaulle Drive is part of LA 428 and is the principal thoroughfare of Algiers, a name applied to the west bank section of New Orleans. The highway curves due west to begin its ascent onto the Crescent City Connection, a pair of cantilever bridges each carrying four lanes of through traffic across the Mississippi River. Additionally, the eastbound (geographically westbound) span contains two reversible HOV lanes, separated from the main travel lanes by a row of Jersey barriers. Due to the bend in the Mississippi River from which the "Crescent City" gets its name and the orientation of the bridges, the remainder of US 90 Bus. carries traffic signed "eastbound" and "westbound" in geographically opposite directions.

=== Downtown New Orleans ===
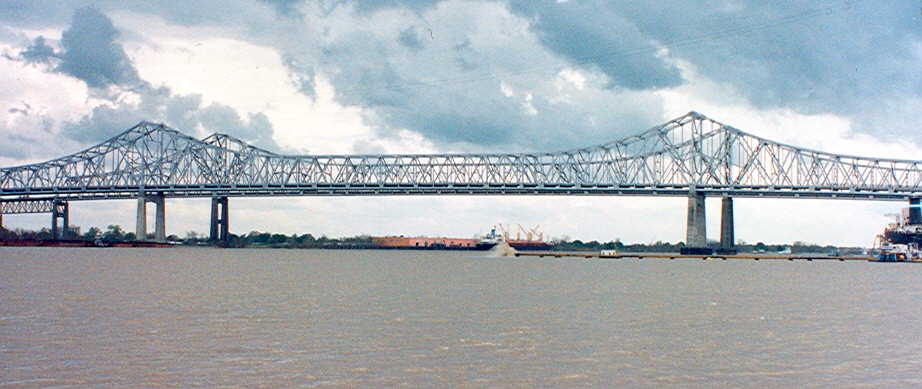
The Crescent City Connection carries US 90 Bus. into downtown New Orleans

After climbing to a height of 150 feet (46 m) above the Mississippi River, US 90 Bus. enters the New Orleans Central Business District and crosses over the city's Convention Center. The highway simultaneously engages in an interchange with Tchoupitoulas Street at exit 11A, the designated exit for truck traffic associated with the Port of New Orleans. (This exit is signed westbound as exit 11 to Tchoupitoulas and South Peters Streets.) US 90 Bus. proceeds northwest onto the Pontchartrain Expressway, an elevated six-lane freeway in the center of Calliope Street, a divided surface street. Several overlapping interchanges with limited movements further serve the business district, beginning with exit 12A (Camp Street), which passes between the National World War II Museum and Lee Circle. This is followed by exit 12D (Carondelet Street/St. Charles Avenue). In addition to being a significant downtown street, St. Charles Avenue is a scenic oak tree-lined boulevard that traverses uptown neighborhoods such as the Garden District and Carrollton. Exit 12C connects with Loyola Avenue, a divided downtown thoroughfare that provides access to the Union Passenger Terminal and the city's two major entertainment venues—the Superdome and New Orleans Arena. At Loyola Avenue, Calliope Street becomes Earhart Boulevard, which serves as a frontage road for a short distance until US 90 Bus. departs from its alignment.

US 90 Bus. enters into a complex interchange with both US 90 (South Claiborne Avenue) and I-10. Separate ramps connect to westbound US 90 (exit 13A), eastbound US 90 (13B), and eastbound I-10 (13C). To the east, US 90 travels beneath the elevated I-10 as it passes through the downtown area en route to Slidell, located on the north shore of Lake Pontchartrain. Following exit 13C, eastbound US 90 Bus. continues straight ahead to merge with westbound I-10, which swings to the northwest to proceed along the Pontchartrain Expressway toward New Orleans International Airport and the city of Baton Rouge. Locally, westbound I-10 carries traffic between downtown New Orleans and the suburbs in Jefferson and St. Tammany parishes, the latter accessed via the Lake Pontchartrain Causeway.

=== Route classification and data ===
US 90 Bus. is classified as an urban freeway by the Louisiana Department of Transportation and Development (La DOTD) and carries the internal designation of US 90-Z. Annual average daily traffic data collected by the department in 2019 showed a low of 38,818 vehicles near Westwego, increasing to a peak of 163,126 vehicles on the Mississippi River bridge. The remainder of the route through downtown New Orleans maintained at least 100,000 vehicles to the junction with I-10. The posted speed limit is 45 mph (70 km/h) along the surface portion of the route, increasing to 60 mph (95 km/h) throughout the west bank freeway portion. The remainder of the route across the Crescent City Connection and along the Pontchartrain Expressway is generally posted at 50 mph (80 km/h).

The portion of US 90 Bus. between the Lafayette Street and Camp Street exits serves as a link in the ten-state National Scenic Byway known as the Great River Road.

== History ==
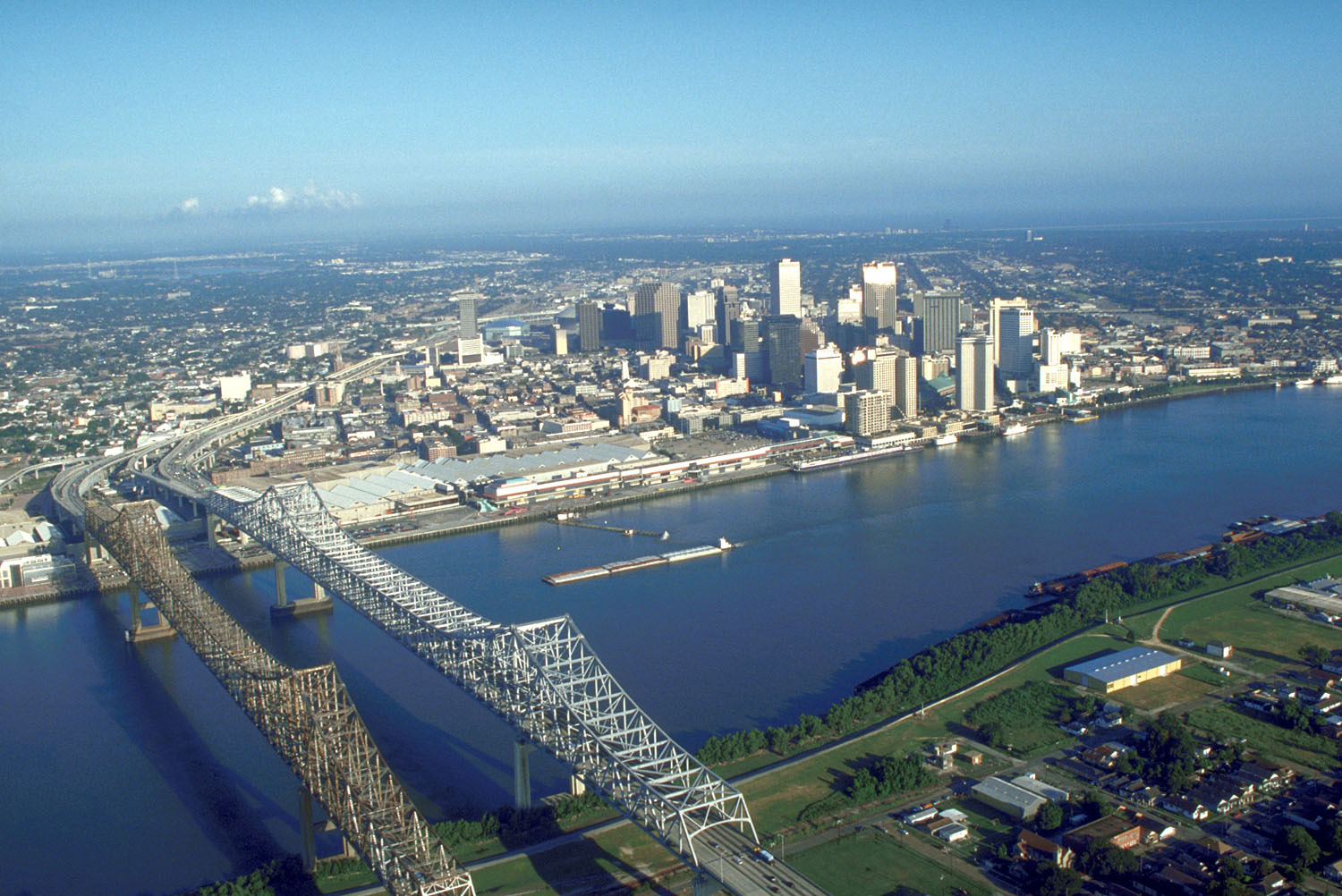
The Crescent City Connection and the New Orleans skyline

The three main elements that constitute the route of US 90 Bus. in New Orleans—the Westbank Expressway, the Crescent City Connection, and the Pontchartrain Expressway—were initially conceived between the 1920s and 1940s as separate projects.

=== Early planning ===
In 1926, New Orleans visionary George A. Hero and engineer Allen S. Hackett proposed the construction of a bridge across the Mississippi River located in downtown New Orleans. At the time, there was no automobile bridge spanning the river south of Memphis, Tennessee. While its construction was authorized by the United States Congress the following year, the project languished in the face of the Great Depression. In 1935, the Huey P. Long Bridge was completed in neighboring Jefferson Parish about 9 miles (14 km) upriver from the city's business district. This bridge was constructed and financed jointly between the Louisiana Highway Commission and the New Orleans Public Belt Railroad primarily to accommodate railroad traffic, which up to that time was forced to cross the river by ferry between the rail yards at Avondale and Harahan. While it contained automobile lanes that benefited through traffic on US 90 through the area, the bridge's location made it inconvenient for local travel between New Orleans and the developing communities on the opposite side of the river. While increasingly outmoded, the string of existing ferry services along the Mississippi River would continue to serve this purpose for another two decades.

Before the existence of the Westbank Expressway, the only highway traversing the west bank communities between US 90 and Algiers was former State Route 30, a narrow two-lane highway that zigzagged through the center of each town. This route is now generally followed by the modern LA 18, which was created in the 1955 Louisiana Highway renumbering. During the 1930s, this once rural area was transformed into a booming industrial corridor focused along the Mississippi River and the Harvey Canal, which had become a link in the Gulf Intracoastal Waterway. By 1942, the existing highway had become heavily congested, and the draw bridge crossing of the Harvey Canal was specifically cited as one of the worst traffic bottlenecks in the entire state. That year, the Jefferson Parish Police Jury and a committee of local citizens began to lobby the state highway department to alleviate the problem by constructing a new four-lane highway parallel to the existing Route 30. The proposed bypass would extend from US 90 near the Huey P. Long Bridge to the Algiers Naval Station. It would also feature a bridge across the Harvey Canal with a higher draw span, allowing most marine traffic to pass underneath without impeding the flow of vehicular traffic.

In 1946, the Louisiana Department of Highways engaged New York-based urban planner, Robert Moses, to study traffic patterns in the New Orleans metropolitan area and compile a report to address current and future transportation needs. Moses devised a multi-phase plan that incorporated both the downtown bridge proposal and the west bank bypass highway. The plan also included the Pontchartrain Expressway, another project discussed for many years involving the construction of a modern highway connecting the downtown area with US 61 (Airline Highway), the main route to the state capital. Moses' plan combined these elements into a continuous traffic artery and provided cost estimates as well as engineering evaluations by the New York firm of Andrews and Clark. Eight more years would pass, however, before construction on these projects would begin.

=== Construction ===
The first project that would eventually become part of US 90 Bus. was underway in June 1954 with the construction of the Harvey Tunnel. Approved by the Louisiana Department of Highways in October 1951, the tunnel had replaced the earlier idea of a bridge across the Harvey Canal. Although the more expensive option, the tunnel would be quicker to build and could be used as a bomb shelter in case the Cold War were to heat up. Construction of the Westbank Expressway began in the vicinity of the Harvey Canal and forged a path largely along the southern edge of the west bank's existing development. It was originally configured as a divided four-lane surface highway with interchanges at US 90 and Victory Drive (now General de Gaulle Drive). (Note: Victory Drive was renamed as General de Gaulle Drive as part of an ordinance proposed by New Orleans' mayor, deLesseps S. Morrison, and approved by the city council in April 1960, commemorating the French president's concurrent visit to the city.) Intersections were provided at major cross streets between these points while two-lane frontage roads provided access to all services and remaining cross streets. The frontage roads began at Louisiana Street in Westwego and continued to the Victory Drive interchange in Algiers, interrupted only at the Harvey Tunnel, through which only the central express lanes traveled. On September 5, 1957, the Harvey Tunnel was opened to traffic and was touted as the first fully automatic underwater vehicular tunnel in the world. Completion of the tunnel was more than 20 months behind schedule due to unexpected soil and cofferdam difficulties. Also placed into service were the adjacent portions of the West Bank Expressway extending west to Barataria Boulevard in Marrero and east to Franklin Avenue in Gretna. A newly reconstructed and improved Franklin Avenue carried through traffic into Algiers at this time.

The Greater New Orleans Bridge, now the westbound (geographically eastbound) span of the Crescent City Connection, began construction in early 1955. The bridge was designed by Modjeski and Masters, the firm responsible for the earlier Huey P. Long Bridge upriver. When opened to traffic in April 1958, the Greater New Orleans Bridge was declared as having the longest cantilever structure in the United States and third longest in the world, its central span totaling 1,575 feet (480 m). The bridge originally contained a 52-foot-wide (16 m) roadway that carried two 12-foot (3.7 m) travel lanes in either direction. The cost of the bridge was approximately $54 million, to be recouped by tolls collected at a toll plaza located at its west bank approach. (The tolls were later removed by Governor John McKeithen in 1964.) Also opened was the first section of the Pontchartrain Expressway, New Orleans' first controlled access freeway, extending from the bridge to an interchange with US 90 (South Claiborne Avenue). The Pontchartrain Expressway also carried four lanes of traffic in its original configuration and contained partial interchanges at Camp Street, St. Charles Avenue, Dryades Street (now O'Keefe Avenue), and Loyola Avenue.

After the opening of the Greater New Orleans Bridge, the Louisiana Department of Highways focused on extending its adjoining expressways to their intended termini. The Pontchartrain Expressway was completed between US 90 (South Claiborne Avenue) and US 61 (Airline Highway) in February 1960. During construction, this segment had been incorporated into the new Interstate Highway System as part of I-10 and was signed accordingly by the end of the year. In September 1960, the Westbank Expressway was completed westward from Barataria Boulevard to its interchange with US 90 near Avondale, which involved filling in a section of Westwego's historic Company Canal. With this accomplished, the designation of US 90 Bus. was applied to the entire route comprising the Westbank Expressway, Greater New Orleans Bridge, and the Pontchartrain Expressway as far as the Claiborne interchange, as it now connected with US 90 at either end. Prior to 1960, the entire route carried the state highway designation of LA 3019, which was changed from Route 2200 in the 1955 Louisiana Highway renumbering.

=== Later improvements ===
In December 1972, the I-10 viaduct in the median of South Claiborne Avenue was completed, closing a gap in the interstate's route between the Pontchartrain Expressway and Tulane Avenue. New ramps were added to directly connect the two sections of I-10 and allow through traffic to bypass the Claiborne interchange. However, no direct connection was provided between US 90 Bus. and the new section of I-10 along South Claiborne Avenue.

During the 1960s and 1970s, the suburbs of New Orleans continued to grow dramatically, including the communities on the west bank of the Mississippi River. The resulting traffic congestion on the Westbank Expressway led to plans that would ultimately convert most of the route into an elevated controlled-access freeway. This project was carried out in stages beginning in September 1977 with the construction of a high-level bridge across the Harvey Canal. When completed in May 1984, the bridge became the route for through traffic while the frontage roads were reconfigured to utilize the existing Harvey Tunnel. Also placed into service at this time was the first section of the elevated expressway on either end of the bridge, extending from Avenue D in Marrero to Manhattan Boulevard in Harvey. The elevated expressway was completed eastward from Manhattan Boulevard to Lafayette Street in Gretna in January 1985 and to Stumpf Boulevard the following September. After several delays, the portion between Stumpf Boulevard and Terry Parkway was completed in February 1987. By 1993, the elevated Westbank Expressway was completed from the General de Gaulle Drive interchange to its present terminus near Westwood Drive in Marrero. The original expressway lanes had been removed from that point through Westwego during the 1980s, leaving all traffic to utilize the existing service roads, which were improved and widened. As of 2020, plans to complete the expressway through Westwego have not come to fruition, although the route is part of the future extension of I-49.

By the 1970s, heavy traffic congestion on the Greater New Orleans Bridge and Pontchartrain Expressway led to the planning of a massive road project that would ultimately become the longest-running in the state's history. Construction began in September 1980 on a parallel span of the Greater New Orleans Bridge designed to carry eastbound traffic on US 90 Bus., freeing the original span to carry four lanes of westbound traffic. The Pontchartrain Expressway was also twinned between the new bridge and the Claiborne interchange, after which the original viaduct was extensively rebuilt. A new exit serving the recently improved Tchoupitoulas Street corridor created a route for truck traffic associated with the Port of New Orleans that had formerly traversed residential uptown neighborhoods. Several ramps accessed directly from neighborhood streets were removed and reconfigured, which was made possible by the construction of new service roads along the expressway. Preservationists celebrated the long-awaited removal of an entrance ramp on Camp Street in the city's historic Lower Garden District, which was replaced by a less conspicuous ramp looping underneath the expressway. Perhaps most significant among the numerous other improvements, new flyover ramps were built to finally provide a direct connection to I-10 east of the Claiborne interchange. For years, motorists had utilized the US 90 east off-ramp to reach I-10 east while performing a dangerous and illegal maneuver that caused numerous accidents and fatalities over the years but was often tolerated by law enforcement out of necessity.

The new span of the Greater New Orleans Bridge was completed in 1988, and both spans were collectively renamed the Crescent City Connection the following year. The entire project was completed and opened to traffic in June 1996 after 16 years and an expenditure of approximately $480 million.

== Future ==

The entire route of US 90 Bus. is planned to become part of I-49, which is currently being extended from Lafayette to New Orleans along the present US 90 corridor. The proposed route south of I-310 in Boutte, which includes US 90 Bus., was officially approved as Future I-49 by the American Association of State Highway Officials on October 1, 1999. Signage identifying the route as such can be seen at various points along the Westbank Expressway. The Federal Highway Administration approved the existing freeway portion of US 90 Bus. to be signed as Interstate 910 in the interim, subject to the approval of the AASHTO's Route Numbering Committee. However, the Louisiana Department of Transportation and Development did not follow through, and the designation remains unused.

== Major intersections ==
Parish	Location	mi	km	Exit	Destinations	Notes
Jefferson	Avondale	0.000– 1.052	0.000– 1.693	1A	Future I-49 north / US 90 west – Boutte, Raceland US 90 east – Huey P. Long Bridge, New Orleans	Western terminus; interchange
Jefferson	Bridge City	1.752	2.820	1B	Segnette Boulevard	Future interchange
Jefferson	Westwego	2.325	3.742	2	LA 18 Spur (Louisiana Street) / Drake Avenue	Southern terminus of LA 18 Spur; future interchange
Jefferson	Marrero	4.020– 4.026	6.470– 6.479	3	Westwood Drive, Central Avenue	Signed westbound at west end of freeway ramp; future interchange
Jefferson	Marrero	4.245– 4.292	6.832– 6.907	Western end of freeway; grade-level roadways continue as frontage roads		
Jefferson	Marrero	4.990– 5.047	8.031– 8.122	4A	Ames Boulevard	Eastbound entrance and westbound exit
Jefferson	Marrero	5.176– 6.074	8.330– 9.775	4B	LA 45 (Barataria Boulevard)	To Jean Lafitte
Jefferson	Harvey	6.153– 6.171	9.902– 9.931	5	MacArthur Avenue	Eastbound exit and westbound entrance
Jefferson	Harvey	6.341– 7.201	10.205– 11.589	Bridge over Harvey Canal (Gulf Intracoastal Waterway)		
Jefferson	Harvey	7.285– 8.007	11.724– 12.886	6A	Manhattan Boulevard	Signed eastbound as exit 6
Jefferson	Harvey	7.785	12.529	6B	LA 3017 (Peters Road) / MacArthur Avenue	Westbound exit only; to Harvey Tunnel and Destrehan Avenue
Jefferson	Gretna	8.096– 8.720	13.029– 14.033	7	LA 18 west / LA 23 south (Lafayette Street)	Eastern terminus of LA 18; western end of LA 23 concurrency (signed on frontage roads); to Belle Chasse and Port Sulphur
Jefferson	Gretna	8.769– 9.446	14.112– 15.202	8	Stumpf Boulevard	Eastern end of LA 23 concurrency (signed on frontage roads)
Jefferson–Orleans parish line	Gretna–New Orleans line	9.569– 10.391	15.400– 16.723	9	LA 428 (General de Gaulle Drive) / Terry Parkway, Frontage Road	Western end of reversible HOV lanes; signed westbound as exits 9A (Terry Parkway) and 9B (General de Gaulle Drive)
Orleans	New Orleans	10.374– 12.058	16.695– 19.405	Crescent City Connection over Mississippi River		
Orleans	New Orleans	11.822– 12.577	19.026– 20.241	11	Tchoupitoulas Street, South Peters Street	Signed eastbound as exit 11A and to Tchoupitoulas Street only
Orleans	New Orleans	11.999	19.311	♦	Convention Center Boulevard	Reversible eastbound exit / westbound entrance
Orleans	New Orleans	12.138– 12.227	19.534– 19.677	12A	Camp Street	Eastbound exit and westbound entrance
Orleans	New Orleans	12.596– 12.649	20.271– 20.357	12B	O'Keefe Avenue	Eastbound exit and westbound entrance
Orleans	New Orleans	12.900– 12.969	20.761– 20.872	12D	Carondelet Street, St. Charles Avenue	Eastbound entrance and westbound exit
Orleans	New Orleans	13.233– 13.506	21.296– 21.736	12C	Loyola Avenue	Eastbound entrance and westbound exit
Orleans	New Orleans	13.008– 14.004	20.934– 22.537	13A	To US 90 west (Claiborne Avenue) / Earhart Boulevard	Eastern end of reversible HOV lanes; Earhart Boulevard signed eastbound only
Orleans	New Orleans	13.452– 14.004	21.649– 22.537	13B	US 90 east (Claiborne Avenue) – Superdome	Superdome signed westbound only
Orleans	New Orleans	13.232– 14.250	21.295– 22.933	13C	I-10 – Slidell, Baton Rouge	Eastern terminus; exit number signed for I-10 east only; exit 234 on I-10; Future eastern end of I-49 concurrency
1.000 mi = 1.609 km; 1.000 km = 0.621 mi: Concurrency terminus; HOV only; Incomplete access
