= Earhart Expressway =

State highway in Louisiana, United States

Louisiana Highway 3139

- Route of the Earhart Expressway (LA 3139) highlighted in red

Route information
- Maintained by Louisiana DOTD
- Length: 5.2 mi (8.4 km)
- Existed: c. 1971–present

Major junctions
- South end: Monroe Street in New Orleans
- LA 3152 in Elmwood
- North end: LA 3154 in Elmwood

Location
- Country: United States
- State: Louisiana
- Parishes: Jefferson, Orleans

Highway system
- Louisiana State Highway System; Interstate; US; State; Scenic
← LA 3138	→ LA 3140

The Earhart Expressway, named for former New Orleans Commissioner of Public Utilities, Fred A. Earhart, is a state highway located in both Jefferson Parish and Orleans Parish, Louisiana. It is also designated as Louisiana Highway 3139 (LA 3139), spanning a total of 5.2 miles (8.4 km). Although it is an odd-numbered highway and is bannered north/south, it travels in a more east-to-west direction.

== Route description ==
From the south (east), LA 3139 begins at the intersection of Earhart Boulevard and Monroe Street in New Orleans. The expressway designation begins several blocks later as Earhart Boulevard transitions into a limited-access freeway after crossing Hamilton Street. Earhart Expressway proceeds westward and passes over Hoey's Canal and the Canadian National Railway (CN) as it crosses from Orleans Parish into Jefferson Parish. A partial interchange at Deckbar Avenue provides access to U.S. 90 (Jefferson Highway). Continuing westward along the southern boundary of Metairie, the expressway passes underneath Causeway Boulevard (LA 3046) and crosses over the Norfolk Southern Railway (NS). A second partial interchange is encountered at Cleary Avenue, providing access to U.S. 61 (Airline Drive), after which the expressway again crosses over the CN railroad tracks as well as Central Avenue. The only full interchange along the route occurs at (South) Clearview Parkway (LA 3152), a north-south thoroughfare which connects the Huey P. Long Bridge with U.S. 61 and I-10. From this interchange, the expressway proceeds westward to a terminus at Dickory Avenue (LA 3154) near Harahan.

The majority of the expressway carries three lanes in each direction, narrowing to two lanes at either end. The posted speed limit is 50 mph (80 km/h), and there is no paved shoulder along the route. Excepting the full interchange at Clearview Parkway, exits only occur from the westbound lanes, and marked on-ramps only serve the eastbound direction. (An unmarked on-ramp enters the westbound lanes from L&A Road behind the Kansas City Southern railroad yard). Earhart Expressway is used as a relatively uncongested route for commuters, as well as an alternate to I-10 or Airline Drive to reach Louis Armstrong New Orleans International Airport.

== Earhart Boulevard ==
The Earhart Expressway is an extension of Earhart Boulevard, a divided four- and six-lane thoroughfare that begins at Loyola Avenue near the New Orleans Union Passenger Terminal. It continues the route of Calliope Street alongside and underneath the Pontchartrain Expressway (U.S. 90 Business), splitting off at South Claiborne Avenue and following an abandoned railroad right-of-way to the beginning of the expressway, about 0.5 miles (0.80 km) from the Orleans/Jefferson Parish line.

== Major intersections ==
Parish	Location	mi	km	Destinations	Notes
Orleans	New Orleans	0.0	0.0	Monroe Street	Southern terminus of LA 3139
Orleans	New Orleans	0.3	0.48	Hamilton Street	South end of freeway and Earhart Expressway designation
Jefferson	Metairie	0.6	0.97	Dakin Street to US 90 (Jefferson Highway)	Unbuilt southbound exit to Dakin Street extension
Jefferson	Metairie	1.1	1.8	L&A Road	Northbound entrance (unsigned)
Jefferson	Metairie	1.5	2.4	Deckbar Avenue to US 90 (Jefferson Highway)	Northbound exit and southbound entrance
Jefferson	Metairie	2.2	3.5	LA 3046 (Causeway Boulevard)	Unbuilt interchange with LA 3046
Jefferson	Metairie	3.0	4.8	To US 61 (Airline Drive) / Cleary Avenue	Northbound exit and southbound entrance
Jefferson	Elmwood	3.9	6.3	LA 3152 (Clearview Parkway) / Huey P. Long Bridge	
Jefferson	Elmwood	5.2	8.4	LA 3154 (Dickory Avenue)	Northern terminus of LA 3139; North end of freeway and Earhart Expressway designation
1.000 mi = 1.609 km; 1.000 km = 0.621 mi: Incomplete access; Unopened
