= Louisiana Highway 3046 =

State highway in Louisiana, United States

Louisiana Highway 3046
- Causeway Boulevard
- LA 3046 highlighted in red

Route information
- Maintained by Louisiana DOTD
- Length: 1.0 mi (1.6 km)
- Existed: c. 1957–present

Major junctions
- South end: US 90 in Jefferson
- North end: US 61 in Metairie

Location
- Country: United States
- State: Louisiana
- Parishes: Jefferson

Highway system
- Louisiana State Highway System; Interstate; US; State; Scenic
← LA 3045	→ LA 3048

Louisiana Highway 3046 (LA 3046) is a state highway in Louisiana that serves Jefferson Parish. It spans 1.0 mile (1.6 km) in a south to north direction. It is known locally as Causeway Boulevard.

== Route description ==
From the south, LA 3046 begins in Jefferson at an interchange with U.S. 90 (Jefferson Highway). It heads north and immediately becomes elevated to cross several railroad tracks and LA 3139 (Earhart Expressway). LA 3046 ends at a multi-level traffic circle interchange with U.S. 61 (Airline Drive) in Metairie. Causeway Boulevard continues northward through Metairie to I-10 (Exit 228) and ultimately the Lake Pontchartrain Causeway.

LA 3046 is a divided, four-lane highway for its entire length.

== History ==
LA 3046 began as part of the Greater New Orleans Expressway, a 1950s project to transform the century-old Harlem Avenue right-of-way into a multilane highway connecting U.S. 90 (Jefferson Highway), U.S. 61 (Airline Highway, now Drive), and Veterans Memorial Highway (now Boulevard) to the Lake Pontchartrain Causeway then under construction. Harlem Avenue would be renamed Causeway Boulevard. The expressway's name survives in the Greater New Orleans Expressway Commission which maintains and patrols the Causeway bridge.

The multilevel rotary interchange at U.S. 61 (Airline Highway) and the hook ramp at U.S. 90 (Jefferson Highway) were opened in June 1957. The narrow hook ramp originally carried two-way traffic (southbound Causeway Boulevard to eastbound Jefferson Highway and eastbound Jefferson Highway to northbound Causeway Boulevard). It was reconfigured in 1999 to carry one-way traffic, with southbound Causeway Boulevard traffic now crossing the Jefferson Highway median to turn eastbound. The ramp's clearance over Jefferson Highway was increased from 14 feet (4.3 m) to 17 feet (5.2 m) in 2009 to facilitate truck traffic passing underneath. Acceleration and deceleration lanes were added to the north side of the rotary interchange in 2003, while the south side remains in its original configuration.

== Major intersections ==
The entire highway is in Jefferson Parish.

Location	mi	km	Destinations	Notes
Jefferson	0.0	0.0	US 90 (Jefferson Highway)	Southern terminus; Partial interchange
Metairie	1.0	1.6	US 61 (Airline Drive)	Northern terminus; Multi-level rotary interchange
1.000 mi = 1.609 km; 1.000 km = 0.621 mi

== Louisiana Highway 3046 Spur ==
Louisiana Highway 3046 Spur
- Location: Metairie
- Length: 0.28 mi (450 m)
- Existed: 1960s–2010

Louisiana Highway 3046 Spur (LA 3046 Spur) was a state highway in Louisiana that served Jefferson Parish. It spanned 0.28 miles (0.45 km) in a west to east direction along Lausat Street.

The western terminus of LA 3046 Spur was at LA 3046 (Causeway Boulevard) between LA 3139 (Earhart Expressway) and U.S. 61 (Airline Drive). There was no connection between the spur route and its parent as the two highways did not meet at grade: LA 3046 (Causeway Boulevard) is elevated via a long overpass, and LA 3046 Spur existed at ground level on Lausat Street. LA 3046 Spur headed east to a terminus at LA 3262 (Labarre Road). The route was deleted in 2010.

LA 3046 Spur was an undivided, two-lane highway for its entire length.

The entire highway was in Metairie, Jefferson Parish.

mi	km	Destinations	Notes
0.00	0.00	LA 3046 (Causeway Boulevard)	Western teminus; no access due to grade separation
0.28	0.45	LA 3262 (Labarre Road)	Eastern terminus
1.000 mi = 1.609 km; 1.000 km = 0.621 mi: Incomplete access
