= Pontchartrain Expressway =

Route information
- Length: 7.0 mi (11.3 km)
- Existed: 1946 (planned); 1955 (construction begun); 1957 (first section opened); 1962 (last section opened)–present
- Component highways: US 90 Bus. / Future I-49 / I-10

Major junctions
- South end: US 90 Bus. / Future I-49 (Westbank Expressway) at the Crescent City Connection
- US 90 Bus. / Future I-49 in New Orleans; US 90 in New Orleans; I-10 in New Orleans
- North end: I-610 / I-10 near the New Orleans–Metarie line

Location
- Country: United States
- State: Louisiana

Highway system
- Louisiana State Highway System; Interstate; US; State; Scenic
- Interstate Highway System; Main; Auxiliary; Suffixed; Business; Future
- United States Numbered Highway System; List; Special; Divided

The Pontchartrain Expressway is a parallel six-lane section of Interstate 10 (I-10) and U.S. Route 90 Business (US 90 Bus.) in New Orleans, Louisiana, USA, with a brief stand-alone section in between junctions with these highways. The designation begins on I-10 near the Orleans–Jefferson parish line at the I-610 Split. The expressway follows I-10 into the Central Business District (CBD) of New Orleans (by the Superdome) and then follows US 90 Bus. to the Crescent City Connection. The expressway takes its name from Pontchartrain Boulevard, which the expressway replaced in some areas. The Pontchartrain name is derived from Lake Pontchartrain, which New Orleans' northern border traverses.

== History ==
Construction of the Pontchartrain Expressway began in the 1950s. It would later be incorporated into Interstate 10. I-10 enters Orleans Parish after crossing the 17th Street Canal; this is where the expressway designation begins. At the vicinity of West End Boulevard/Florida Avenue exit, the expressway turns to the southeast along the right-of-way for the former New Basin Canal which had been filled in between 1937 and 1947. The expressway continues along this right-of-way as I-10 until a stack interchange with U.S. 90 (Claiborne Avenue) in the CBD.

At this interchange, I-10 breaks off to the northeast and Business U.S. 90 begins. The expressway continues southeast along the upriver side of the CBD as an elevated highway that leads to the Crescent City Connection. This section was completed by the 1958 opening of the Crescent City Connection.

The Business U.S. 90 portion of the expressway was expanded in the mid 1980s to accommodate the second span of the Crescent City Connection which opened in 1988. This stretch of the expressway and the stack interchange of I-10 and U.S. 90 received further reconstruction in the early 1990s, including two reversible HOV lanes that stretch from the intersection of Earhart Boulevard and Magnolia Street (underneath the Pontchartrain Expressway) across the Crescent City Connection to the Westbank Expressway. Reconstruction of the northern end of the expressway in the I-610 Split vicinity was undertaken in the late 1990s. Also in the late 1990s, further work was done on the expressway as two ramps were constructed, connecting West I-10 to West Business U.S. 90 and westbound Claiborne Avenue (West US 90), replacing an earlier, more dangerous ramp. The direct ramp from 90B East to I-10 East was completed by 1989.

The Norfolk Southern Railway has an overpass crossing near the Metairie Cemetery between the City Park Avenue and West End Boulevard/Florida Avenue exits. The expressway dips down to 12 feet (3.7 m) below sea level to allow for the rail line to pass overhead. This area once experienced flooding on a regular basis in heavy thunderstorms and tropical systems. The problem was so common, a depth meter was painted on the overpass support columns to warn drivers of the water's depth. A new pumping station was completed adjacent to the expressway in 2004 to keep this area dry and allow the interstate to remain open in the event of an evacuation.

== Hurricane Katrina ==
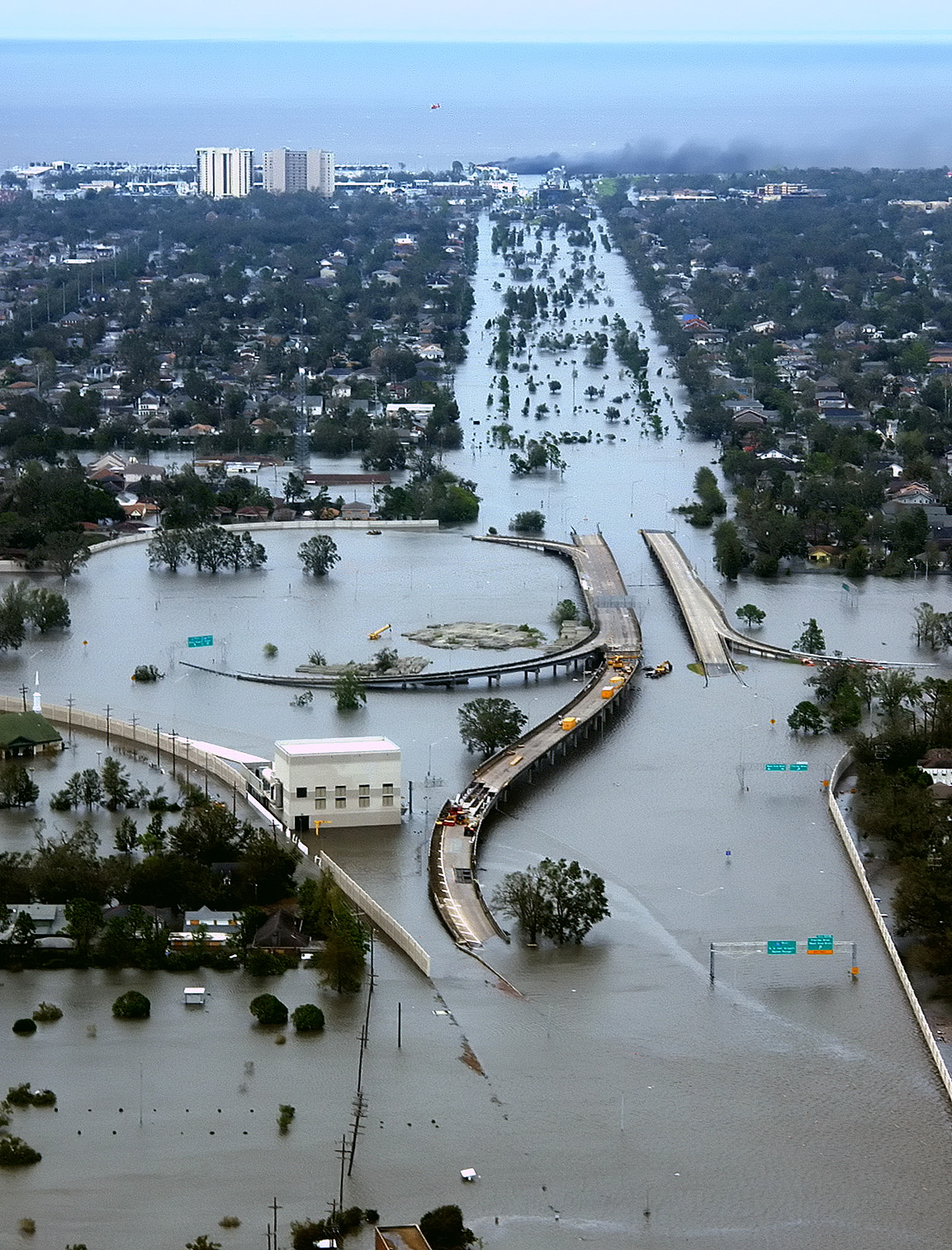
The I-610/West End Blvd exit near the western end of the Pontchartrain Expressway was extensively flooded in the aftermath of Hurricane Katrina.

In the aftermath of Hurricane Katrina, this pumping station was overwhelmed and the railroad underpass and the entire I-610/West End Boulevard interchange was extensively flooded. In fact, the 17th Street Canal breach is about one mile (1.6 km) north of this area. This flooding cut Orleans Parish off from most areas to the west, making the Crescent City Connection one of the few clear routes into the east bank of Orleans Parish. Areas under the elevated portions of the expressway in the CBD area saw flooding in the vicinity of the Superdome but for the most part remained dry and undamaged. Some evacuees trapped in the city for days after Katrina attempted to use the expressway and the Crescent City Connection to walk to dry ground on the west bank.

== Interstates 49 and 910 ==
The Business U.S. 90 portion of the Pontchartrain Expressway is also designated as Interstate 910, however it is not signed as such. This is a temporary designation that overlaps all freeway portions of Business U.S. 90 (the Pontchartrain Expressway, Crescent City Connection, and Westbank Expressway). When Interstate 49 is completed from Lafayette to New Orleans, Business U.S. 90/Interstate 910 will be re-signed as Interstate 49.

== Exit list ==
Parish	Location	mi	km	Exit	Destinations	Notes
Orleans	New Orleans	0.000	0.000		US 90 Bus. west	Continuation westbound as the Westbank Expressway
Orleans	New Orleans	0.000– 2.105	0.000– 3.388	Crescent City Connection over Mississippi River; Southern terminus		
Orleans	New Orleans	1.440– 2.195	2.317– 3.533	11	Tchoupitoulas Street / South Peters Street	Exit numbers continue from Westbank Expwy. numbering; signed as exit 11A northbound and to Tchoupitoulas St. only
Orleans	New Orleans	1.756– 1.845	2.826– 2.969	12A	Camp Street	Northbound exit only
Orleans	New Orleans	1.756– 1.845	2.826– 2.969		Calliope Street	Southbound entrance only
Orleans	New Orleans	2.214– 2.587	3.563– 4.163	12D	Carondelet Street / St. Charles Avenue	Southbound exit and northbound entrance
Orleans	New Orleans	2.267	3.648	12B	O'Keefe Avenue	Northbound exit only
Orleans	New Orleans	2.267	3.648		Calliope Street	Southbound entrance only
Orleans	New Orleans	2.626– 3.622	4.226– 5.829	—	To US 90 west (Claiborne Avenue) / Earhart Boulevard	No northbound entrance
Orleans	New Orleans	2.851– 3.131	4.588– 5.039	12C	Loyola Avenue	Southbound entrance and northbound exit
Orleans	New Orleans	3.070– 3.622	4.941– 5.829	13B	US 90 Bus. east to US 90 east (Claiborne Avenue)	North end of US 90 Bus. concurrency; southbound exit is part of exit 13A
Orleans	New Orleans	3.070– 3.622	4.941– 5.829	13A	US 90 west (Claiborne Avenue) – Superdome	Southbound exit and northbound entrance
Orleans	New Orleans	3.070– 3.622	4.941– 5.829	13C	I-10 east – Slidell	South end of I-10 concurrency; I-10 WB exit 234C, EB exit 234A
Orleans	New Orleans	4.0– 5.4	6.4– 8.7	232	US 61 north (Airline Highway) US 61 south (Tulane Avenue); Carrollton Avenue	Exit numbers follow I-10
Orleans	New Orleans	5.3– 6.0	8.5– 9.7	231A	Metairie Road (LA 611-9 west) / City Park Avenue	Eastern terminus of unsigned LA 611-9
Orleans	New Orleans	6.2– 6.6	10.0– 10.6	231B	Florida Boulevard / West End Boulevard	West End Blvd. is a one-way street; northbound exit only
Orleans	New Orleans	6.2– 6.6	10.0– 10.6	231B	Pontchartrain Boulevard	One-way street; southbound entrance only
Orleans–Jefferson parish line	New Orleans–Metairie line	6.2– 7.00	10.0– 11.27	230	I-610	Northern terminus; western terminus of I-610; exit 1B on I-610; southbound entrance only
Orleans–Jefferson parish line	New Orleans–Metairie line	6.2– 7.00	10.0– 11.27		I-10 west – N.O. Int'l Airport, Baton Rouge	Continuation west beyond northern terminus
1.000 mi = 1.609 km; 1.000 km = 0.621 mi: Concurrency terminus; Incomplete access; Route transition
