= Elmwood, Louisiana =

- Census-designated place
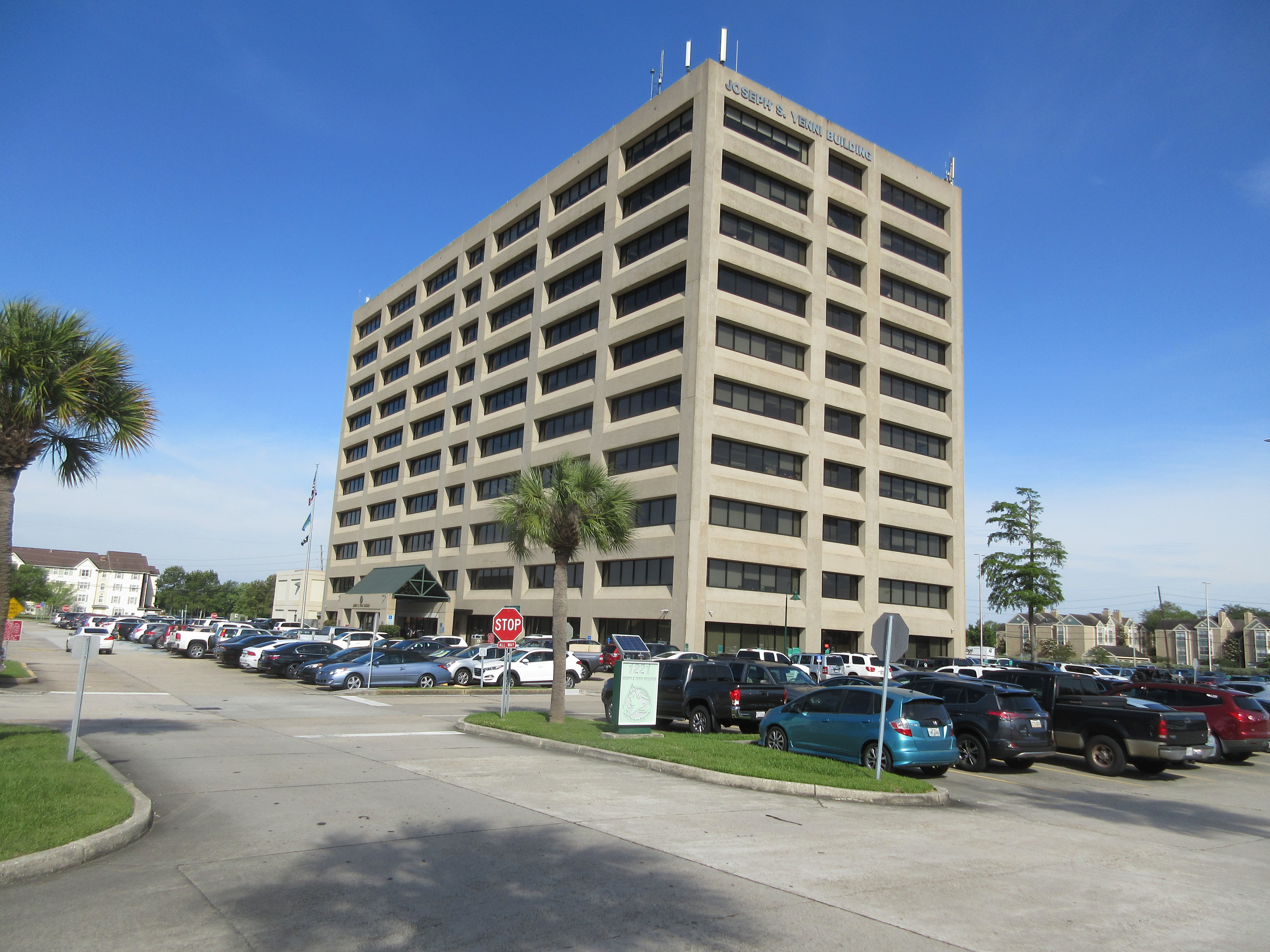
- The Joseph S. Yenni Building in Elmwood houses much of Jefferson Parish Government offices for the East Bank of the Parish.

- Location of Elmwood in Louisiana
- Coordinates: 29°57′23″N 90°11′10″W
- Country: United States
- State: Louisiana
- Parish: Jefferson

Area
  - Total: 4.04 sq mi (10.46 km^{2})
  - Land: 3.77 sq mi (9.77 km^{2})
  - Water: 0.27 sq mi (0.69 km^{2})
- Elevation: 3 ft (0.91 m)

Population (2020)
  - Total: 5,649
  - Density: 1,496.8/sq mi (577.93/km^{2})
- Time zone: UTC−6 (CST)
  - Summer (DST): UTC−5 (CDT)
- ZIP Code: 70123
- Area code: 504
- FIPS code: 22-23567

Elmwood is a census-designated place (CDP) in Jefferson Parish, Louisiana, United States, within the New Orleans–Metairie–Kenner metropolitan statistical area. The population was 4,635 at the 2010 census, and 5,649 in 2020. Elmwood was part of neighboring Jefferson's census area from 1960 to 1990. The ZIP Code serving Elmwood is 70123.

== History ==
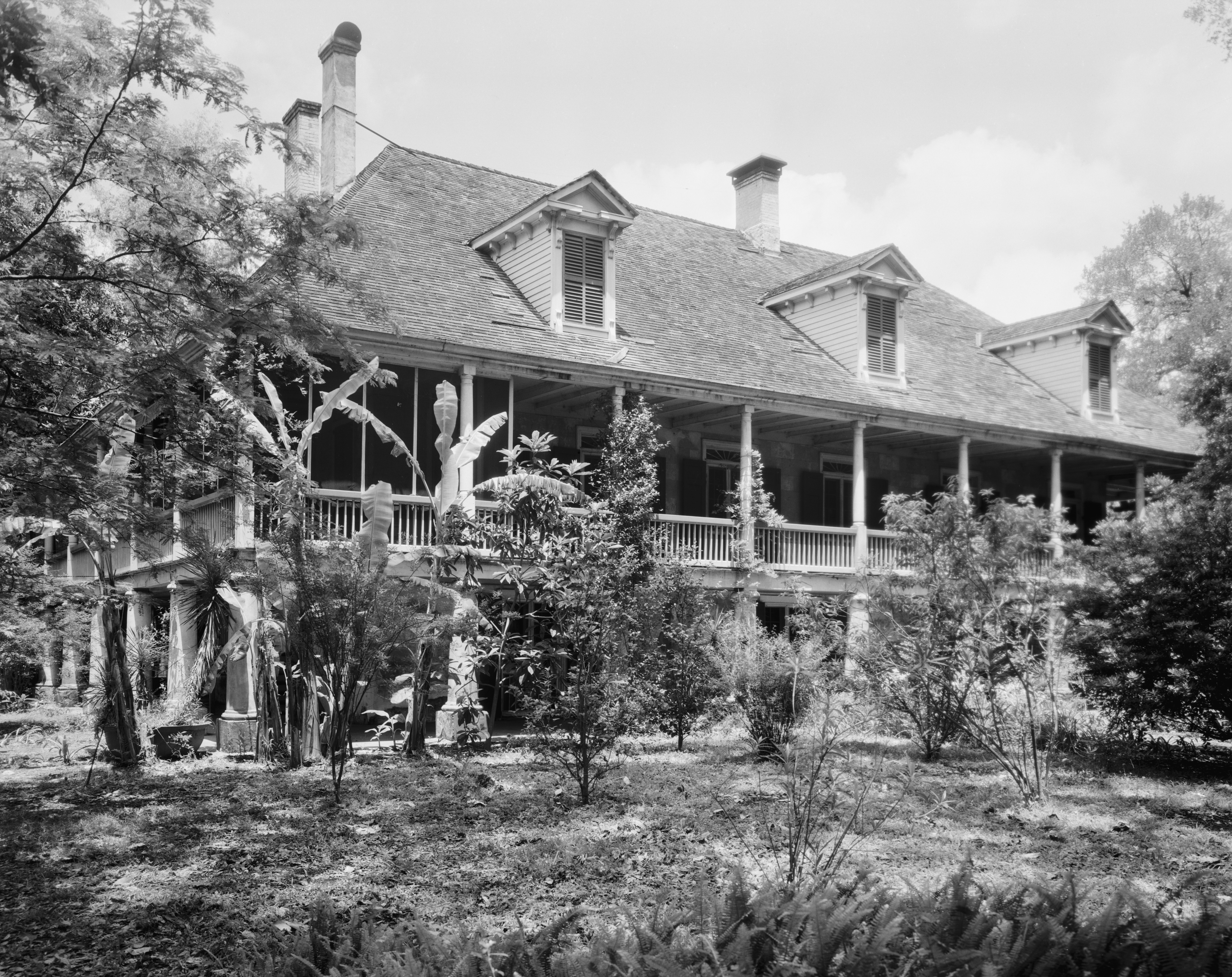
Elmwood Planation House in 1938. The building was later converted into a restaurant, which was destroyed by fire in 1978.

Elmwood was plantation land starting in the French and Spanish colonial era. The opening of the Huey P. Long Bridge in 1935 kicked off more modern development.

== Geography ==
Elmwood is located in northern Jefferson Parish at 29°57′23″N 90°11′10″W (29.956455, −90.186098). It is bordered to the north by Metairie, to the east by Jefferson, to the west by Harahan, and to the south, across the Mississippi River, by Avondale and Bridge City. The Huey P. Long Bridge, carrying U.S. Route 90, crosses the Mississippi from Elmwood to Bridge City. Downtown New Orleans is 9 miles (14 km) to the east.

According to the United States Census Bureau, the Elmwood CDP has a total area of 4.03 square miles (10.45 km^{2}), of which 3.77 square miles (9.77 km^{2}) are land and 0.26 square miles (0.68 km^{2}), or 6.52%, are water.

== Demographics ==
Historical population
Census	Pop.	Note	%±
2000	4,270		—
2010	4,635		8.5%
2020	5,649		21.9%
U.S. Decennial Census

Elmwood was first listed as a census designated place in the 2000 U.S. census.

Elmwood CDP, Louisiana – Racial and ethnic composition Note: the U.S. Census Bureau treats Hispanic/Latino as an ethnic category. This table excludes Latinos from the racial categories and assigns them to a separate category. Hispanics/Latinos may be of any race.
Race / Ethnicity (NH = Non-Hispanic)	Pop 2000	Pop 2010	Pop 2020	% 2000	% 2010	% 2020
White alone (NH)	3,277	2,894	2,781	76.74%	62.44%	49.23%
Black or African American alone (NH)	490	918	1,582	11.48%	19.81%	28.00%
Native American or Alaska Native alone (NH)	12	11	16	0.28%	0.24%	0.28%
Asian alone (NH)	194	299	496	4.54%	6.45%	8.78%
Native Hawaiian or Pacific Islander alone (NH)	1	3	0	0.02%	0.06%	0.00%
Other race alone (NH)	18	12	38	0.42%	0.26%	0.67%
Mixed race or Multiracial (NH)	54	102	196	1.26%	2.20%	3.47%
Hispanic or Latino (any race)	224	396	540	5.25%	8.54%	9.56%
Total	4,270	4,635	5,649	100.00%	100.00%	100.00%

The 2019 census estimates determined 5,698 people lived in the CDP, up from 4,635 at the 2010 U.S. census. In 2020, its population was 5,649. The racial and ethnic makeup was 52.4% non-Hispanic white, 28% Black or African American, 0.2% Native American, 0.2% some other race, 1.4% two or more races, and 11.8% Hispanic or Latino American of any race per 2019 estimates; and in 2020, the population was a tabulated 49.23% non-Hispanic white, 28% Black or African American, 0.28% Native American, 8.78% Asian, 4.14% two or more races, and 9.56% Hispanic or Latino American of any race. This has reflected the demographic growth among Hispanic populations nationwide. In 2019, the median household income was $57,396 and 7% of the population lived at or below the poverty line.

== Economy ==
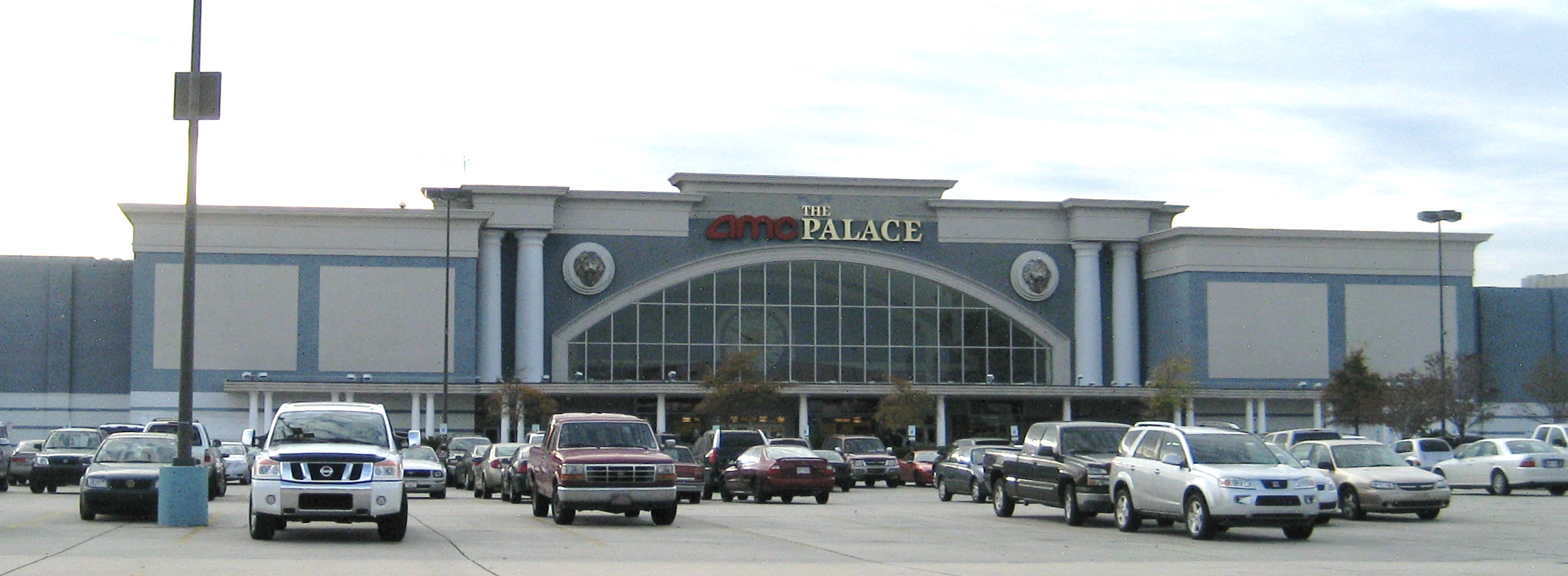
AMC Palace Cinema in Elmwood

Elmwood is home to the offices of the Strategic Petroleum Reserve, operated by Fluor for the United States Department of Energy.

Elmwood is also home to a Coca-Cola bottling plant, the Elmwood Business Park, Elmwood Shopping Center, and various small businesses with the largest concentration along Clearview Parkway. In 2025, the Amazon same-day delivery site for Greater New Orleans opened in Elmwood.

== Government ==
The United States Postal Service operates a post office in Elmwood.

== Education ==
The Jefferson Parish Public School System (JPPSS) operates district public schools.

Most residents are zoned to: Jefferson PreK-8 School in Jefferson for elementary and middle school, while some are zoned to Harahan PreK-8 School in Harahan for those levels. All residents are zoned to Riverdale High School in Jefferson.

In regards to the advanced studies academies, most areas are zoned to Airline Park Academy, while some areas are zoned to Metairie Academy.

In 2012 the Jefferson Parish campus of the International School of Louisiana (ISL) charter school opened in a leased JPPSS building on South Clearview Parkway in Elmwood. The JPPSS board later arranged for the charter school to move from the Elmwood facility to the former Ralph J. Bunche Academy in Metairie.

In the mid-2010s most residents were zoned to Harahan Elementary School while some were zoned to Jefferson Elementary School (now merged into Jefferson PreK-8). All students were zoned to Riverdale Middle School (now part of Jefferson PreK-8).
