= International School of Louisiana =

School in Louisiana, United States

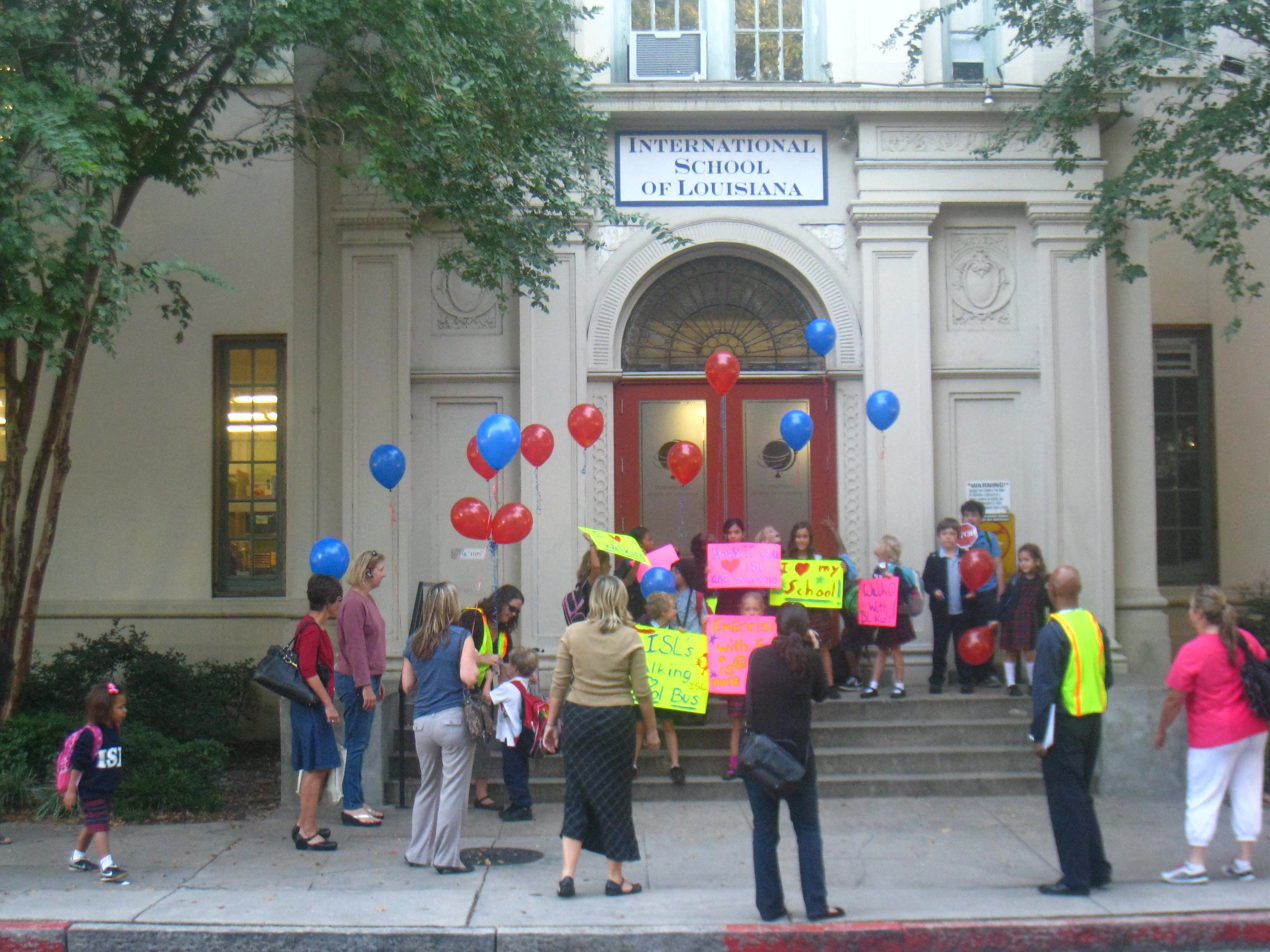

Location
- Dixon Campus: 4040 Eagle St. Uptown Campus: 1400 Camp St. Westbank Campus; New Orleans, Louisiana; United States

Information
- Established: 2000
- Founder: Julie Fabian, Maria Redmann Treffinger, Jane Fitzpatrick, Shelley Stephenson Midura, Ivan Baas-Thomas
- Status: Open
- Oversight: State of Louisiana
- Staff: Over 200 staff members from 33 countries
- Grades: K-8
- Gender: Co-educational
- Enrollment: Approximately 1,200 students
- Education system: Charter school
- Campus type: Urban
- Website: Official website

The International School of Louisiana (ISL) is a system of charter schools in Greater New Orleans. Three campuses are located in New Orleans. The K-8 school offers a French immersion program and a Spanish immersion program. As of 2007 it was one of two New Orleans schools chartered by the State of Louisiana that is not a part of the Recovery School District. The International School of Louisiana (ISL) educates students in K-8 across three campuses located in Dixon (K-2nd), Uptown (3-8th), and the Westbank (K-5th). ISL employs over 200 staff members from 33 countries and fluent in 23 different languages who educate approximately 1200 students (43% African American, 29% White, 25% Latin American/Hispanic, 2% Asian/Pacific and 1% American Indian).

== History ==
The school was founded in 2000 by Julie Fabian, Maria Redmann Treffinger, Jane Fitzpatrick, Shelley Stephenson Midura, and Ivan Baas-Thomas. The original location was at the First United Methodist Church in Mid-City, but the school relocated to Camp Street after Hurricane Katrina.

In 2011 ISL had received more applications for the French immersion program than it had in any previous year. That year, its Algiers campus opened. It was the first language immersion school on the West Bank side.

In 2012 the Jefferson Parish campus opened. When it opened it had 328 students, a smaller number than originally anticipated. The Jefferson Campus closed in 2014.

The school restructured in 2017, opening the Dixon Campus at 4040 Eagle St. Serving students from Kindergarten-2nd, re-organizing the Uptown campus to serve 3rd-8th at 1400 Camp St., and serving Kindergarten-5th at the Westbank campus.

Currently, ISL serves 1183 students across 3 campuses in New Orleans (Dixon Campus, Uptown Campus, and Westbank Campus).

== Locations ==
The Dixon Campus is located at the former Mary Bethune Building in the Dixon Neighborhood. The Uptown Street Campus is located in the former Andrew Jackson Elementary School in the Lower Garden District (29.9363°N 90.0727°W). The Olivier Street campus is located in Algiers Point.

== Academics ==
In 2014, according to the state rankings, the school system received an "A" grade. The Center for Education Reform in 2007 ranked the International School as one of the best charter schools in the United States.
