= Harahan, Louisiana =

City in Louisiana, United States

- City
- City of Harahan
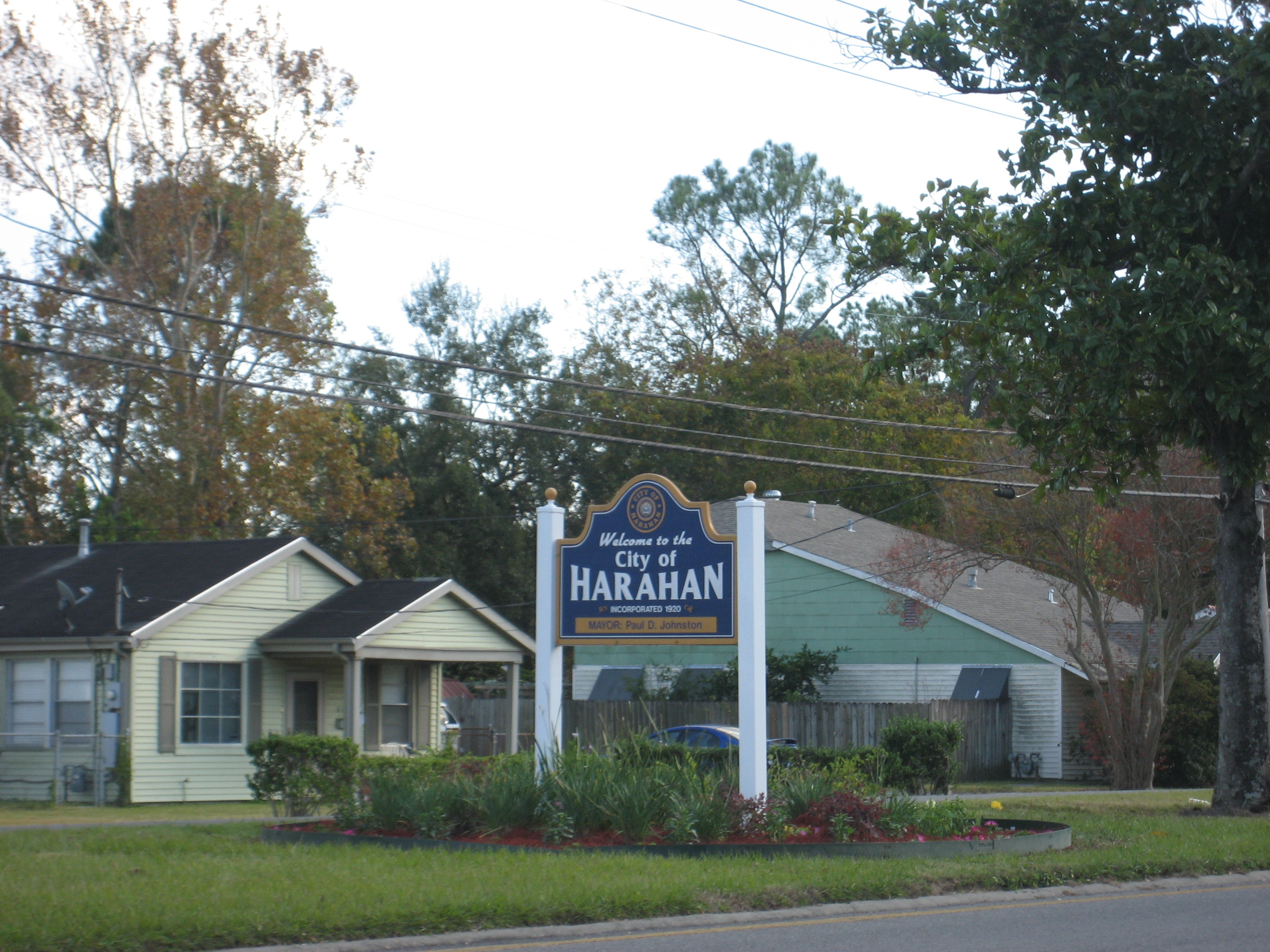
- Welcome sign on Jefferson Highway

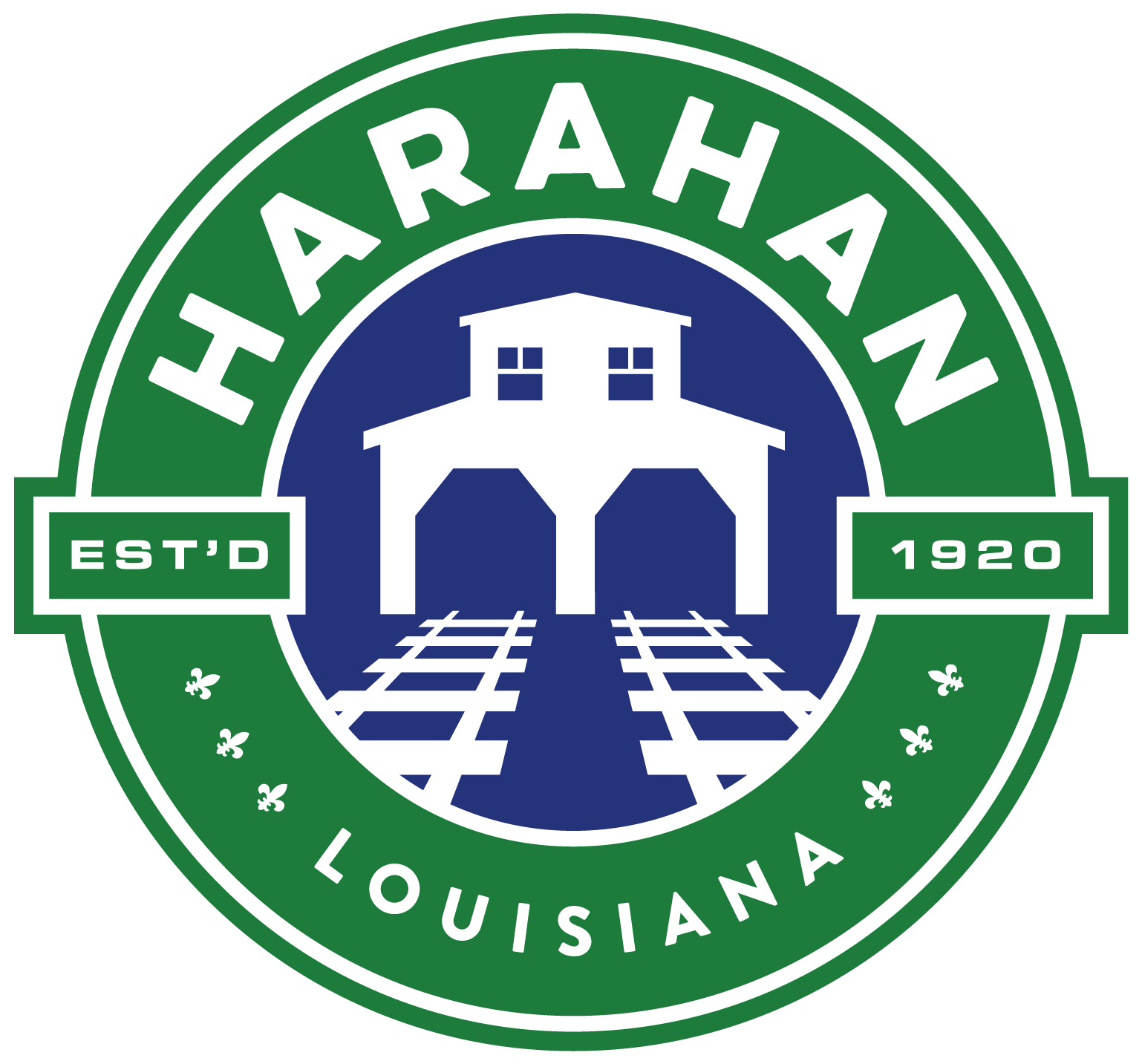
- Flag Seal

- Location of Harahan in Jefferson Parish, Louisiana.

- Location of Louisiana in the United States
- Coordinates: 29°56′15″N 90°12′11″W
- Country: United States
- State: Louisiana
- Parish: Jefferson

Government
  - Mayor: Tim Baudier (R)

Area
  - Total: 2.49 sq mi (6.46 km^{2})
  - Land: 2.02 sq mi (5.23 km^{2})
  - Water: 0.47 sq mi (1.23 km^{2})
- Elevation: 10 ft (3.0 m)

Population (2020)
  - Total: 9,116
  - Rank: JE: 3rd
  - Density: 4,516.8/sq mi (1,743.95/km^{2})
- Time zone: UTC-6 (CST)
  - Summer (DST): UTC-5 (CDT)
- ZIP code: 70123
- Area code: 504
- FIPS code: 22-32930
- GNIS feature ID: 2403796
- Website: www.harahanla.gov

Harahan is a city in Jefferson Parish, Louisiana; it is a suburb of New Orleans. Its population was 9,116 at the 2020 census.

== History ==
Harahan occupies land which was once part of the Soniat Plantation. The area was historically known for ideal conditions to use as farming and raising cattle. In the late 1800s, part of the former plantation was used as an experimental farm operated by Southern University and A&M College.

Non-agricultural development began in 1894, when the Illinois Central Railroad (now Canadian National) built a repair yard and roundhouse adjacent to the current city hall. In 1914, the Harahan Land Company, composed of ICRR officials, bought the Southern University tract of land and subdivided it. Residents included railroad workers, river workers and truck farmers. The village of Harahan was incorporated in 1920–named after James Theodore Harahan, the ICRR President.

Prior to the Huey P. Long Bridge being built, Harahan was one of few points on the entire Mississippi River where railcars could cross. The Illinois Central and Southern Pacific Railroads maintained a ferry crossing between Harahan and Avondale to carry their railroad cars across the Mississippi River. To reach this ferry, the rail cars traveled up an incline that brought them over the river levee. The three largest barges in the world, the Mastodon, the Mammoth and El Grande once called Harahan home.

In 1908, the Colonial Country Club was built and occupied the old Soniat Plantation home. By 1910, Wedell-Williams on the eastern edge of Harahan had become the de facto New Orleans airport, and aviation pioneer John Moisant died there in a plane accident while preparing for a competition. Shortly thereafter, Harahan dedicated Moisant Park on Hickory Avenue in his honor. This park was later renamed Zeringue Park shortly after World War II. Wedell-Williams operated commercial and military flights through the 1940s.

In 1930, the Huey P. Long Bridge was opened, increasing the importance of Harahan and by 1940, the population had risen to 1,082 citizens.

During World War II, Camp Plauche was established on the current land occupied by Elmwood. In addition to the camp, Freiburg Mahogany manufacturing began producing critical aircraft and boat components for the war effort. This activity spurred economic growth, particularly new homes; Harahan's population tripled during this period. This growth continued after the war.

By 1960, the population had grown to over 9,000. Numerous improvements were undertaken, including modernizing the police and fire departments, paving more streets and building a water treatment facility. Commercial activity was limited to Jefferson Highway and the northern end of Hickory. The 1970s and early 80s so rapid development of apartment construction on Hickory and areas of Elmwood. Completion of Earhart Expressway, making access to New Orleans proper much easier, influenced this growth as the appeal of Harahan as a “bedroom community.” Today, Harahan is directly influenced by its relationship with the larger surrounding areas including Jefferson Parish and the city of New Orleans.

== Demographics ==
Historical population
Census	Pop.	Note	%±
1930	892		—
1940	1,082		21.3%
1950	3,394		213.7%
1960	9,275		173.3%
1970	13,037		40.6%
1980	11,384		−12.7%
1990	9,927		−12.8%
2000	9,885		−0.4%
2010	9,277		−6.2%
2020	9,116		−1.7%
2025 (est.)	8,916	▼	−2.2%
U.S. Decennial Census

Harahan city, Louisiana – Racial and ethnic composition Note: the U.S. Census Bureau treats Hispanic/Latino as an ethnic category. This table excludes Latinos from the racial categories and assigns them to a separate category. Hispanics/Latinos may be of any race.
Race / Ethnicity (NH = Non-Hispanic)	Pop 2000	Pop 2010	Pop 2020	% 2000	% 2010	% 2020
White alone (NH)	9,415	8,468	7,421	95.25%	91.28%	81.41%
Black or African American alone (NH)	61	197	382	0.62%	2.12%	4.19%
Native American or Alaska Native alone (NH)	43	42	17	0.44%	0.45%	0.19%
Asian alone (NH)	34	93	110	0.34%	1.00%	1.21%
Native Hawaiian or Pacific Islander alone (NH)	3	3	1	0.03%	0.03%	0.01%
Other race alone (NH)	6	13	16	0.06%	0.14%	0.18%
Mixed race or Multiracial (NH)	80	56	352	0.81%	0.60%	3.86%
Hispanic or Latino (any race)	243	405	817	2.46%	4.37%	8.96%
Total	9,885	9,277	9,116	100.00%	100.00%	100.00%

The 2010 U.S. census tabulated a population of 9,277. At the 2000 U.S. census, there were 9,885 people, 3,994 households, and 2,799 families residing in the city. In 2000, the population density was 5,023.5 inhabitants per square mile (1,939.6/km^{2}). In 2019, there were 4,082 housing units. By the 2020 United States census, there were 9,116 people, 3,733 households, and 2,262 families residing in the city.

In 2000, there were 3,994 households, out of which 28.2% had children under the age of 18 living with them, 55.2% were married couples living together, 11.1% had a female householder with no husband present, and 29.9% were non-families. 25.3% of all households were made up of individuals, and 11.4% had someone living alone who was 65 years of age or older. The average household size was 2.42 and the average family size was 2.91.

In the city, the population was spread out, with 20.8% under the age of 18, 6.9% from 18 to 24, 28.5% from 25 to 44, 24.0% from 45 to 64, and 19.8% who were 65 years of age or older. The median age was 41 years. For every 100 females, there were 90.1 males. For every 100 females age 18 and over, there were 86.9 males. In 2019, the American Community Survey estimated 3.4% of the population were under 5 years of age; 82.2% were aged 18 and older; and 20.6% were aged 65 and older. The median age was 44.2 and 90.9% of the population spoke only English at home.

At the 2019 American Community Survey, the median income for a household was $66,741, up from $44,702 in 2000. The median earnings for full-time, year-round males was $46,996 versus $43,022 for females. The city had a poverty rate of 10.3%.

In 2019, the racial and ethnic makeup of Harahan was 83.9% non-Hispanic white, 4.8% Black or African American, 1.1% Asian, 0.1% multiracial, and 10% Hispanic or Latino American of any race. A year later, the U.S. Census Bureau determined 81.41% of the population was non-Hispanic white, 4.19% Black or African American, 0.19% Native American, 1.21% Asian, 0.01% Pacific Islander, 4.04% multiracial or some other race, and 8.96% Hispanic or Latino American of any race. In 2000, the racial and ethnic makeup of the city was 97.06% White, 0.62% African American, 0.45% Native American, 0.37% Asian, 0.03% Pacific Islander, 0.37% from other races, and 1.10% from two or more races; 2.46% of the population were Hispanic or Latino American of any race. Against nationwide demographic trends since 2020, Harahan has remained predominantly non-Hispanic white as non-White Americans migrate to other suburban communities surrounding New Orleans.

== Arts and culture ==
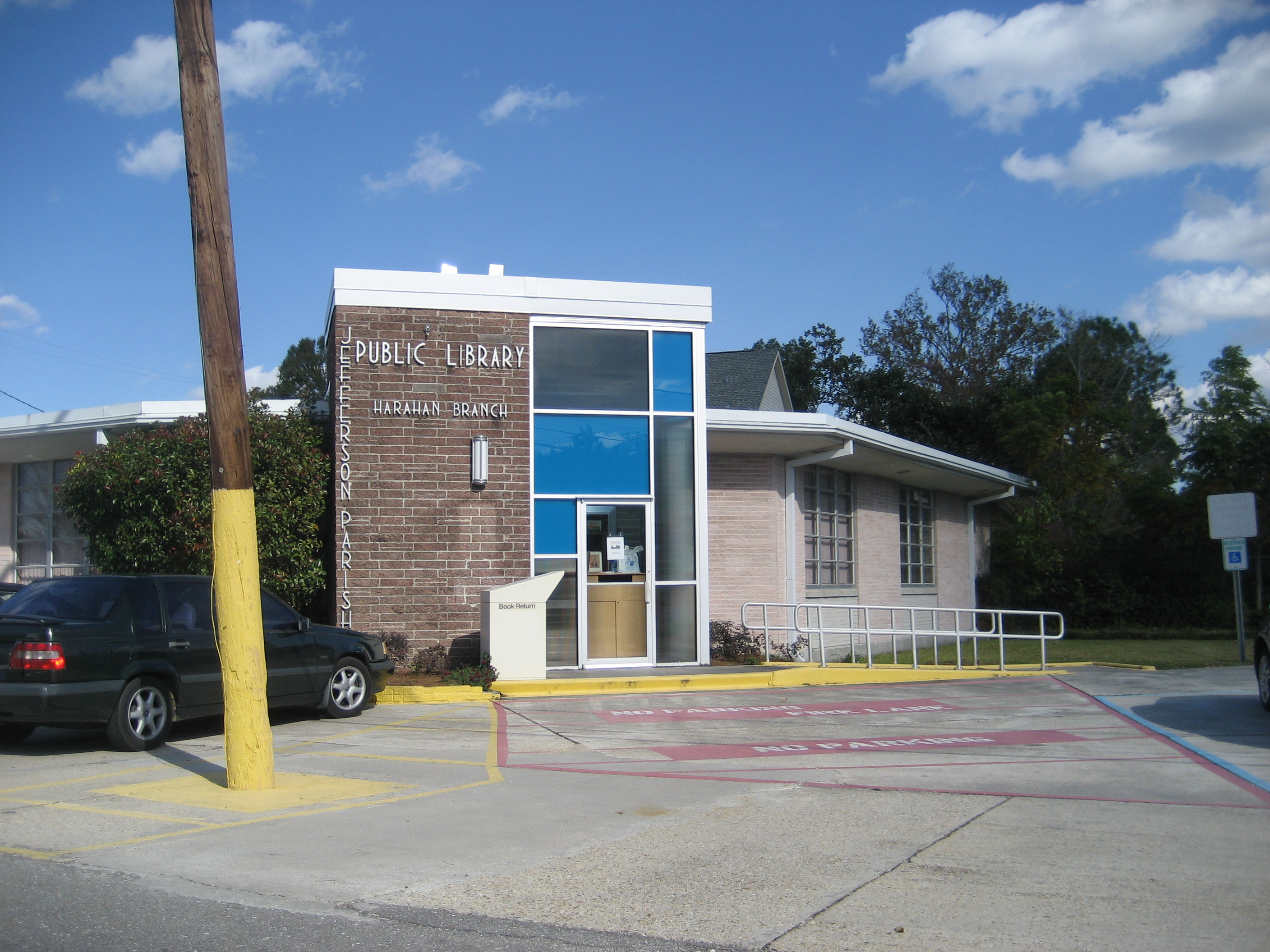
Harahan Library

Jefferson Parish Library operates the Harahan Library.

== Parks and recreation ==
Harahan was home to Colonial Golf and Country Club. It hosted the 1954 New Orleans Women's Open. It closed in early 2012.

== Education ==
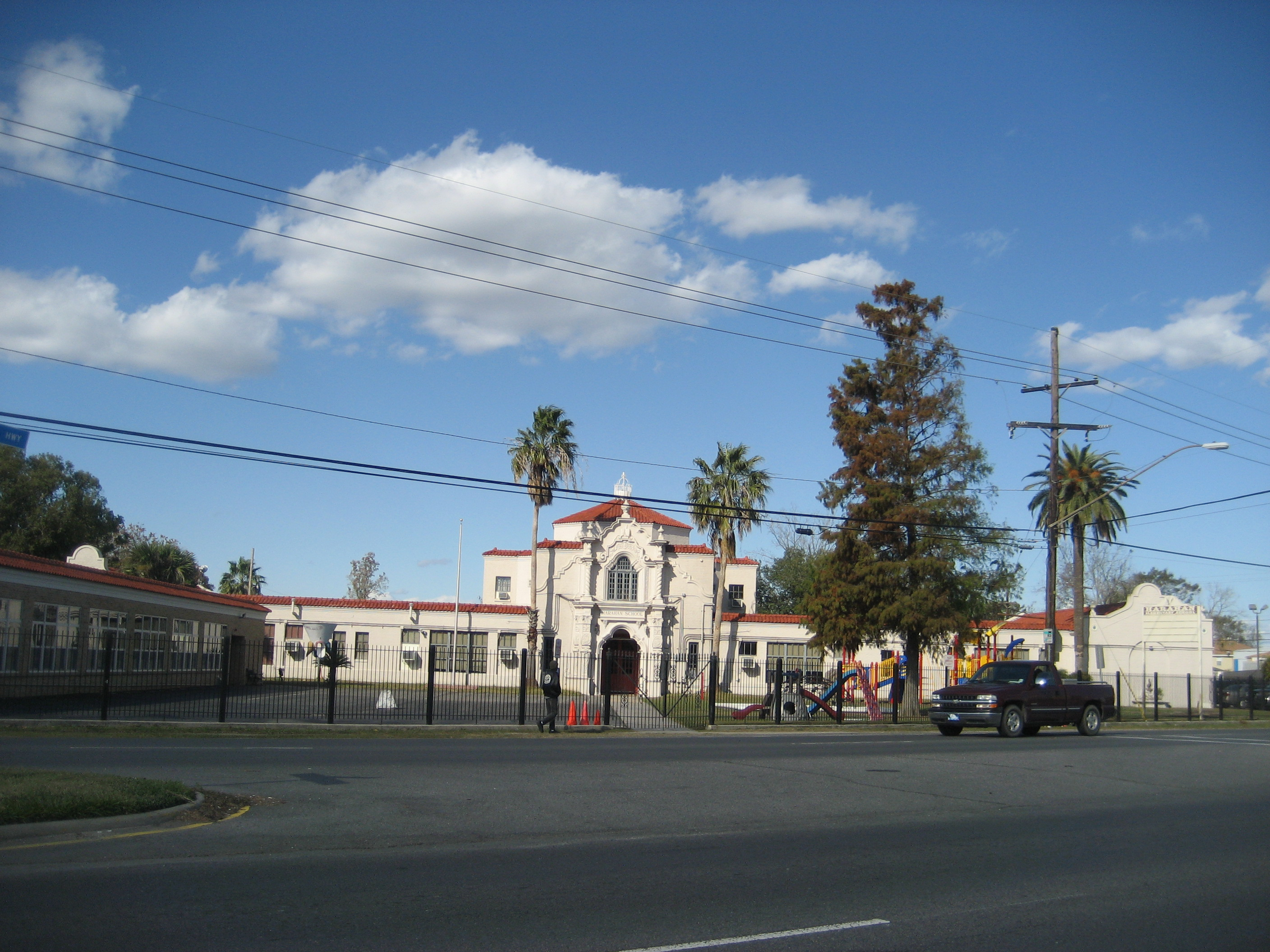
Harahan School on Jefferson Highway

Harahan's public schools are operated by the Jefferson Parish Public Schools (JPPS).

Residents are zoned to Harahan School (formerly an elementary school) for PK-8, and Riverdale High School in Jefferson. Formerly Harahan ES took elementary grades, while Riverdale Middle School in Jefferson (now part of Jefferson PK-8 School) took middle school grades.

In regards to the advanced studies academies, students are zoned to Airline Park Academy.

In 2012, the Jefferson Parish campus of the International School of Louisiana (ISL) charter school opened in a leased JPPPS building on South Clearview Parkway in Elmwood. near Harahan. The Jefferson Parish Public School board later arranged for the charter school to move from the Elmwood facility to the former Ralph J. Bunche Academy in Metairie.

Private Schools in Harahan include St. Rita, a Catholic Elementary and Middle School, and Faith Lutheran, a K-12 Private Lutheran School.

== Notable people ==
- Robert T. Garrity, Jr., politician
- Johnny Giavotella, second baseman for Kansas City Royals
