= Veterans Memorial Boulevard =

Louisiana thoroughfare

- Length: 9.9 mi (15.9 km)
- Location: Metairie, Louisiana, U.S. New Orleans, Louisiana, U.S.
- West end: Belleview Boulevard in Kenner
- Major junctions: LA 49 in New Orleans I-10; LA 3019; I-610 I-10
- East end: West End Boulevard

Veterans Memorial Boulevard, formerly Veterans Highway (locally referred to as Vets or Veterans), is a 6-lane thoroughfare in Jefferson Parish, Louisiana, U.S., and Orleans Parish, Louisiana, U.S., running west–east mostly parallel to Interstate 10. The western terminus is at Belleview Boulevard in Kenner just north of the Louis Armstrong New Orleans International Airport and just east of the St. Charles Parish line. Veterans then proceeds in an easterly direction across the Jefferson Parish communities of Kenner and Metairie before crossing the 17th Street Canal into New Orleans and terminating at West End Boulevard approximately 1/2 mile east of the Orleans Parish line.

Veterans is primarily a commercial corridor lined with malls such as Lakeside Shopping Center and Clearview Mall, strip shopping centers and car dealers. During Carnival season, several Mardi Gras parades roll along portions of Veterans as they wind through the streets of Metairie. Beginning in 1978, the Jefferson Parish Council adopted a standardized parade route for Metairie, which began at the Clearview Shopping Center and rolled east along Veterans before disbanding at Bonnabel Boulevard. In 2019, the council started allowing krewes the option of parading westbound from Bonnabel to Clearview. The Clearview Mall opened on November 3, 1969, at Veterans Memorial Boulevard and Clearview Parkway. Demolition of the enclosed mall began in July 2026 as part of its redevelopment into the open-air Clearview City Center. The original Clearview mall closed in May 2026 when Zea Rotisserie & Bar, its final interior tenant, vacated its longtime location."Clearview Mall owners plan $100M 'live, work, play' transformation". New Orleans CityBusiness. December 5, 2019.Welty, Chris (July 6, 2026). "Clearview Mall demolition begins as $100M redevelopment moves forward". WVUE. Gray Media.

Veterans Memorial Boulevard is dedicated to the memory of all veterans.
