= Huey P. Long Bridge (Jefferson Parish) =

Road and railroad bridge in Louisiana, U.S.

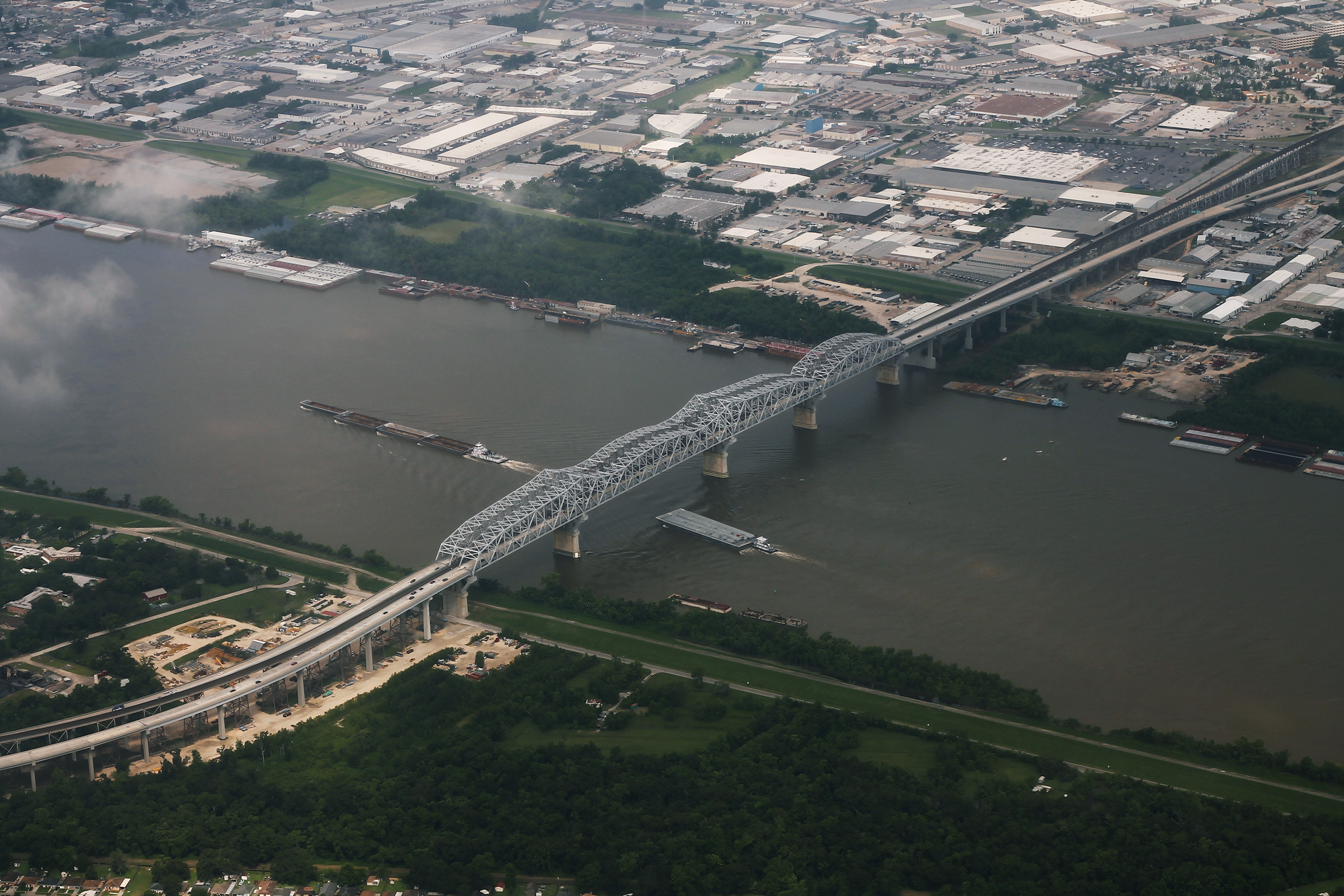
- Aerial view of the bridge in 2013
- Coordinates: 29°56′39″N 90°10′08″W
- Carries: US 90 and New Orleans Public Belt Railroad
- Crosses: Mississippi River
- Locale: Jefferson Parish, Louisiana
- Owner: New Orleans Public Belt Railroad
- Maintained by: Louisiana Department of Transportation and Development; New Orleans Public Belt Railroad
- ID number: 022600060100001

Characteristics
- Design: Cantilever truss bridge
- Total length: Road: 8,076 ft (2,462 m); Rail: 22,996 ft (7,009 m)
- Width: 84 ft (26 m)
- Longest span: 790 ft (241 m)
- Clearance below: 153 ft (47 m)
- No. of lanes: 6

Rail characteristics
- No. of tracks: 2
- Track gauge: 4 ft 8 1/2 in (1,435 mm) standard gauge

History
- Construction cost: $13.4 million (equivalent to $247 million in 2025)
- Opened: December 1935
- Rebuilt: June 2013

Statistics
- Daily traffic: 41,000 vehicles (2023); 18.9 trains (2014)

Location
- Interactive map of Huey P. Long Bridge

The Huey P. Long Bridge, (Note: The bridge is also known by local Vietnamese Americans as the Huỳnh Phi Long bridge, a phono-semantic matching of Huey P. Long's name in the style of a Vietnamese name.) located in Jefferson Parish, Louisiana, is a cantilevered steel through-truss bridge that carries a two-track railroad line over the Mississippi River at mile 106.1, with three lanes of US 90 on each side of the central tracks. It is several miles upriver from the city of New Orleans. The East Bank entrance is at Elmwood, Louisiana, and the West Bank at Bridge City.

Opened in December 1935, the bridge was named for the late Governor Huey P. Long, who was assassinated on September 8 of that year. The bridge was the first Mississippi River span built in Louisiana and the 29th along the length of the river. It was designed by Polish-American engineer Ralph Modjeski and is designated as a National Historic Civil Engineering Landmark by the American Society of Civil Engineers.

On June 16, 2013, a $1.2 billion widening project by the Louisiana Department of Transportation and Development was completed and opened to motorists. The bridge now consists of three 11-foot (3.4 m) lanes in each direction, with inside and outside shoulders. Prior to the expansion, there were two 9-foot (2.7 m) lanes in each direction with no shoulders. In both cases, the road lanes flanked the twin railroad tracks contained within the truss.

In 2014, a writer at The New Yorker described the bridge as "a structure so vaulting and high that it seems to extend from one white, towering Gulf Coast cloud to the next."

== Structure ==
The widest clear span is 790 feet (240 m) long while each of the three additional spans are 530 feet (160 m) long, making the total river crossing about 2,400 feet (730 m) long. There are three navigation channels below the bridge, the widest being 750 feet (230 m). The vertical clearance below the structure is 152.9 feet (46.6 m). The distinctive rail structure is 22,996 feet (7,009 m) long and extends as rail viaducts well into the city on both sides of the river from the central spans. It has sometimes been described as the longest rail bridge in the US, but the nearby Norfolk Southern Lake Pontchartrain Bridge, at 5.8 miles (9.3 km), is considerably longer. The highway structure is 8,076 feet (2,462 m) long with steep grades on both sides. As originally constructed, each roadway deck was 18 feet (5.5 m) wide, with two 9-foot (2.7 m) lanes; but because of the railroad component, it is unusually flat. Normally, bridges its height have a hump, but this bridge was designed flat to facilitate rail traffic.

The bridge is a favorite railfan location. It is owned by the New Orleans Public Belt Railroad, which is owned by the City of New Orleans and managed by the Public Belt Railroad Commission. The bridge was hated by many drivers in the New Orleans area due to the narrow 9-foot-wide (2.7 m) lanes without shoulders before it was widened. Additionally, where the East Bank approach met the superstructure of the bridge, the two vehicular roadways "jogged" or shifted inwards towards the bridge centerline about 1 1/2 feet (0.46 m) since the through-truss portion of the superstructure was 3 feet (0.91 m) wider than the deck truss portion of the east approach.

The foundation of the bridge is also unique. The land in and around New Orleans was formed by silt deposits brought down the Mississippi River. The clay topsoil, known colloquially as "gumbo soil," is compressible and unsuitable for foundation loads. As bedrock is around 1,000 feet (300 m) below the surface, making it too deep for normal bridge foundation construction, the main piers are seated on a layer of fine sand 160 to 170 feet (49 to 52 m) below Mean Gulf Level and rely on their size and mass to hold them in place.

The bridge dates from an era when large bridges mixing rail tracks and highways were common, as typified by the MacArthur Bridge and McKinley Bridge in St. Louis, Missouri, and the Harahan Bridge in Memphis, Tennessee. A second Huey P. Long Bridge, which is very similar to the design of this bridge in New Orleans before its renovation, was built further upstream in 1940 in Baton Rouge, Louisiana. While both of the Long bridges still carry both types of traffic, most of the others have been converted either to entirely rail use (Harahan since 1949, MacArthur since 1981) or exclusive road use (McKinley since 1978), sometimes with bicycle and/or pedestrian use added (McKinley in 2007, Harahan in 2016).

== History ==
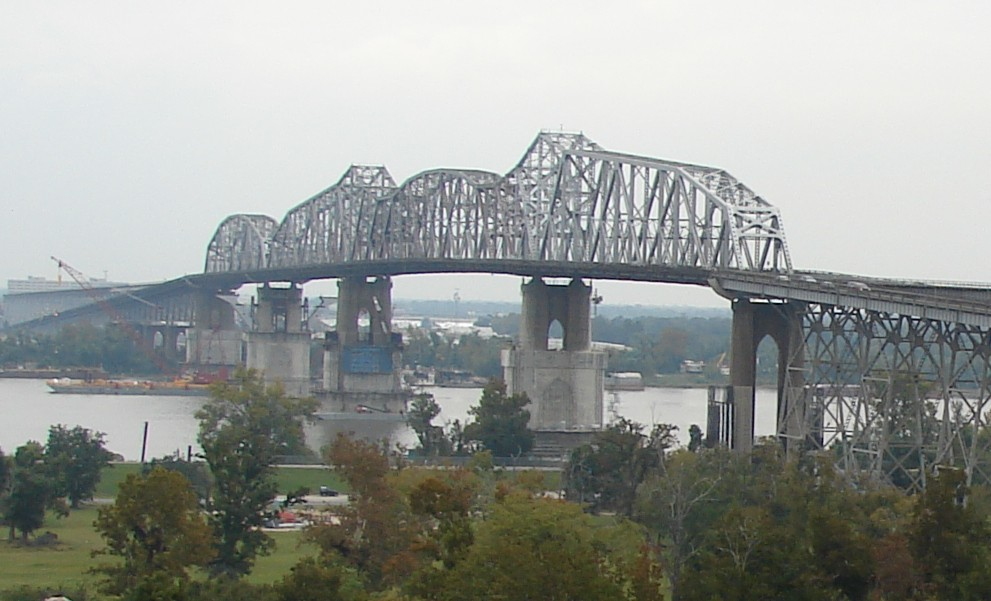
The Huey Long Bridge in 2007, when widening work had just begun

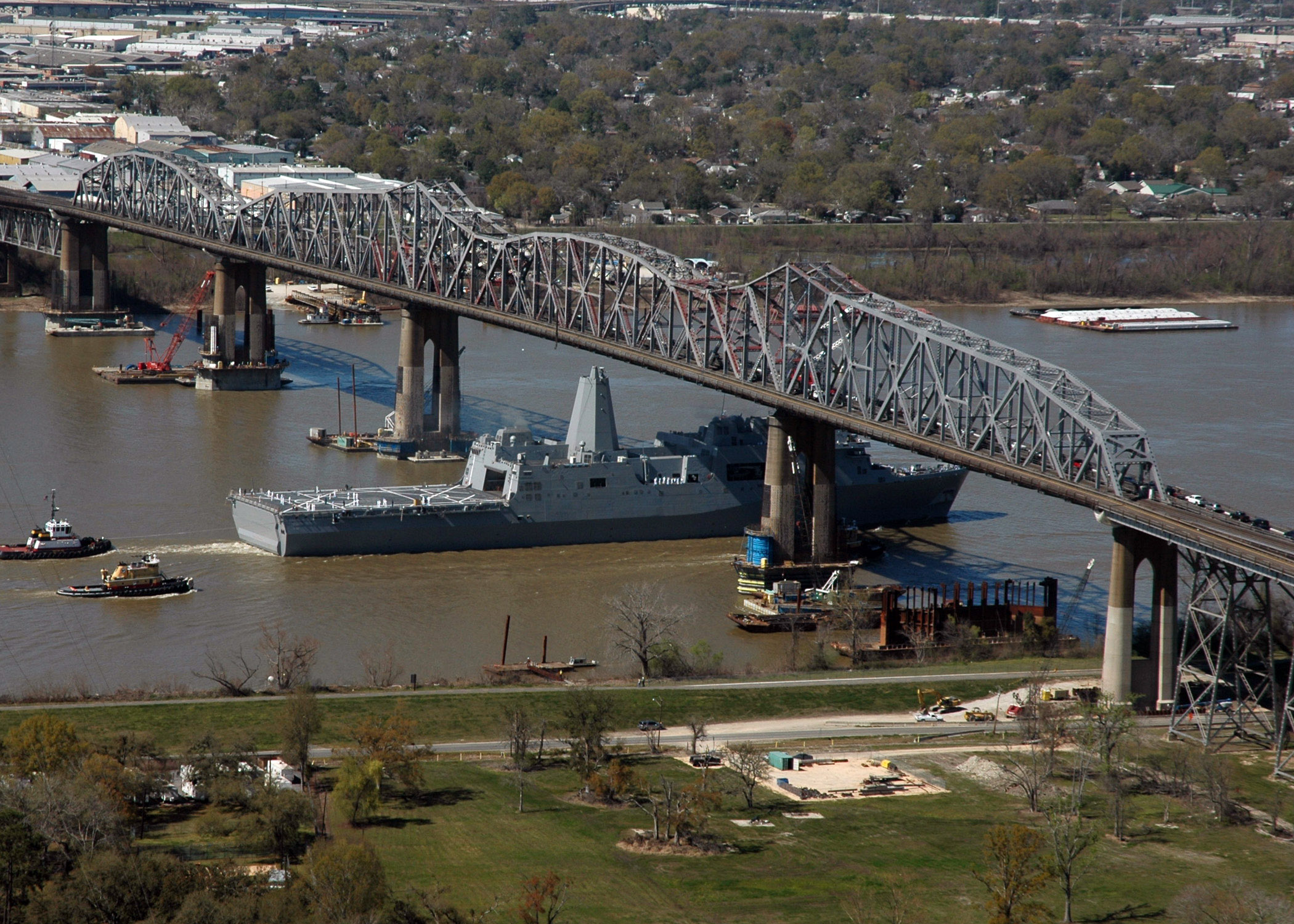
USS New Orleans passes under the bridge, March 2007

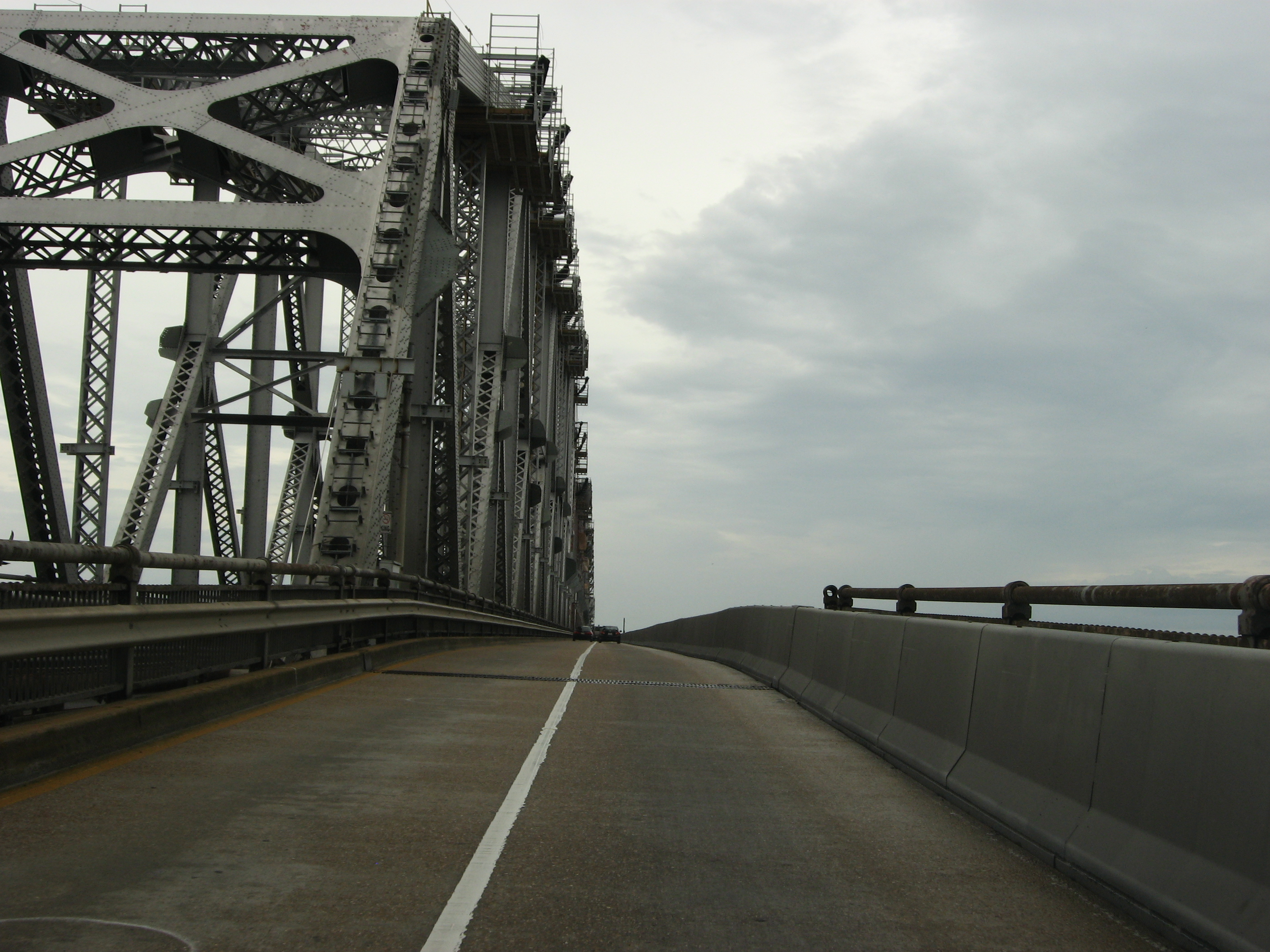
The bridge deck in its original configuration in 2009

As early as 1892 the Southern Pacific Railway proposed a high-level bridge, but a depression that year prevented further work on a project that would have been an overwhelming challenge for the engineers of the time due to soil conditions and extremely high clearances for river navigation. With the development of the Public Belt Railroad, interest in a river rail crossing grew and led to passage of a constitutional amendment in 1916 granting the city exclusive power to build and operate a crossing. Three general ideas emerged from the planning process: a low-level drawbridge, a tunnel, and a high-level bridge. The tunnel idea died first, because it would have provided limited capacity, and the War Department (after years of wrangling) ultimately rejected the idea of a drawbridge as too problematic for such a significant concentration of vital transportation infrastructure.

Work on the design of the bridge began in earnest in 1925 by the engineering firm of Modjeski and Masters. Some pilings were actually driven that year to prevent expiration of congressional authority and provide further information for the design. As the magnitude of the project became apparent and projected costs ballooned, financing difficulties compounded by the Great Depression delayed the project. Finally, on November 5, 1932, the bonds of the Public Belt Railroad Commission were guaranteed by a complex agreement between the Southern Pacific Railroad, the City of New Orleans and the State of Louisiana. Principal construction contracts were signed on December 30, 1932, and work formally started the following day. Construction of the bridge proceeded smoothly over a three-year period with only minor interruptions due to high water and a one-month strike in September 1933.

=== Expansion ===
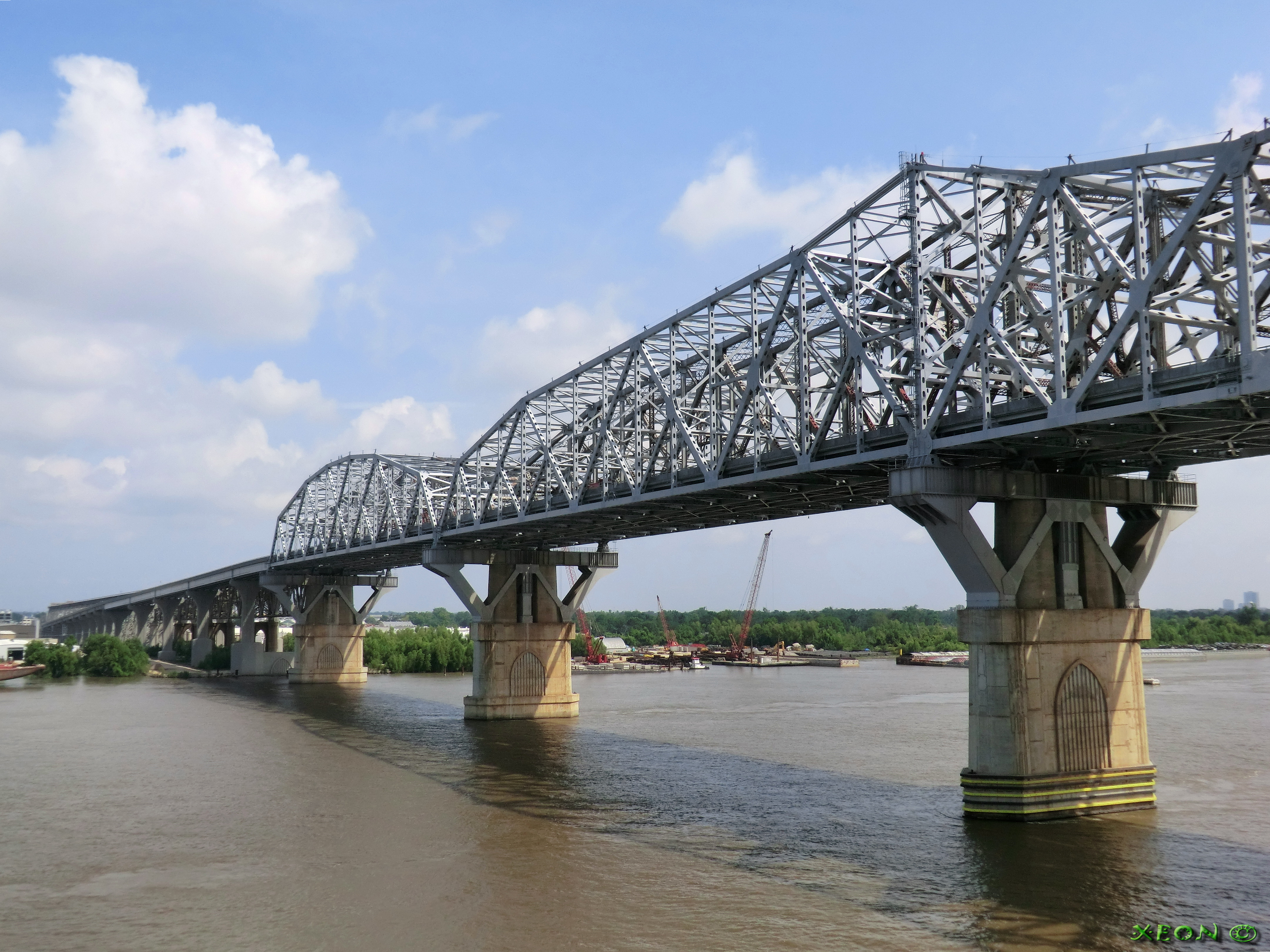
Part of the bridge in 2013, showing the pier and deck expansions

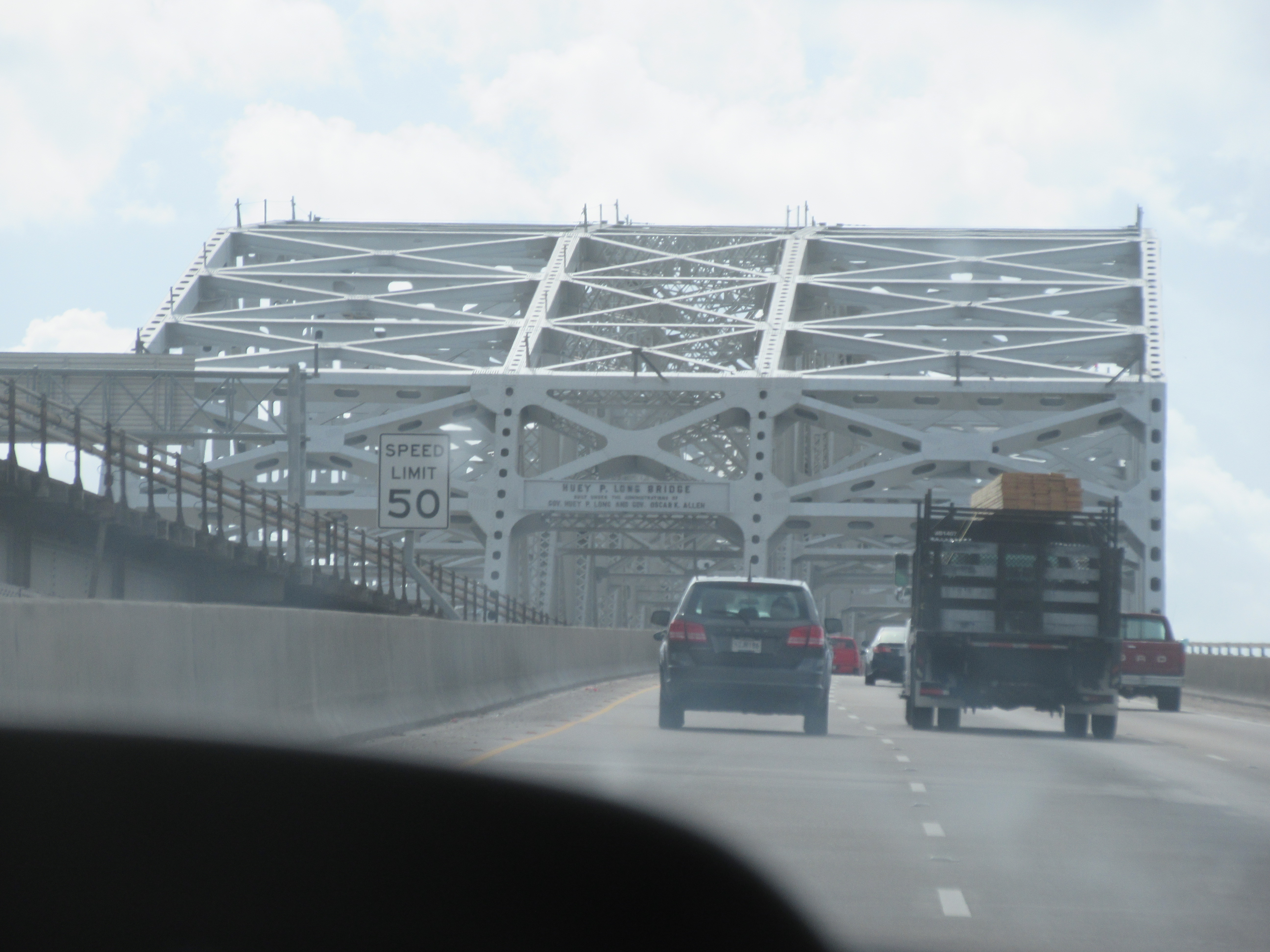
The bridge deck in 2019

The Huey P. Long Bridge Widening Project is a TIMED (Transportation Infrastructure Model for Economic Development) Program project. The TIMED Program was created by Act 16 of the 1989 Louisiana Legislature, was voted for by the people and is the single largest transportation program in state history. The Program is designed to enhance economic development in Louisiana through an investment in transportation projects.

The $1.2 billion widening project started in April 2006 and is the first change to the structure since it opened in 1935. The project expanded the highway on each side of the structure from two 9-foot (2.7 m) lanes to three 11-foot (3.4 m) lanes with a 2-foot (0.61 m) inside shoulder and an 8-foot (2.4 m) outside shoulder. It also included new signalized intersections to replace the traffic circles at Jefferson Highway and at Bridge City Avenue, both in Jefferson Parish, Louisiana.

This seven-year-long, four-phase project was completed in 2013. The timeline of the project was as follows:

Phase I: Main support widening (piers)
In this phase, completed in May 2009, four river piers and one land pier were widened to support the additional lanes. Reinforcing framework and concrete filled the void sections of the piers to strengthen them. In addition, w-shaped metal bridge struts were anchored to the upper part of each pier to support the additional new trusses and the existing truss.

Phase II: Railroad modifications
In October 2006, work to relocate five selected railroad supports was done to facilitate the construction of the new approaches. This phase was completed in June 2008.

Phase III: Main bridge widening (truss)
Completed in 2012, this phase widened the existing truss on either side to accommodate new travel lanes and shoulders.
The bridge, which is composed of four spans, was erected one span at a time. In November 2009, construction of the West Bank Anchor Span began by using the stick-built method, meaning each element of the span was individually placed. In order to minimize the use of falsework and river closures in the navigation or auxiliary channels, the three remaining spans were done through the span-by-span method. This method involved large barges transporting a pre-assembled span section, positioning it under the bridge, and lifting it into position using strand jacks. Temporary stability frames made up of floorbeams and towers were used to support each span section during the lifting process.

This phase was completed on April 29, 2012, when traffic was shifted from the original lanes (two 9-foot (2.7 m) lanes in each direction, cantilevered on each side of the original truss) to two temporary lanes in each direction on the widened portion of the truss.

Phase IV: New approaches construction
During this phase of the project, the two temporary lanes were widened to three 11-foot (3.4 m) lanes in each direction with 8-foot (2.4 m) shoulders and 2-foot (0.61 m) inside shoulders. The traffic circles at each end of the bridge were replaced with signalized intersections. Also, new roadway and elevated structures were constructed.

Four cameras were installed to view the approaches and ramps construction – two on the East Bank of Jefferson Parish and two on the West Bank of Jefferson Parish.

On February 5, 2013, Louisiana Department of Transportation and Development Secretary Sherri LeBas announced that the bridge would be fully open to drivers on June 16, 2013.

== Incidents ==
On April 27, 2015, a severe storm knocked several double stack train cars off the track as the train crossed the Huey P. Long Bridge, with no injuries reported. The accident was captured by a WGNO News Team dashcam.

== See also ==
- List of bridges documented by the Historic American Engineering Record in Louisiana
- List of bridges in the United States
- List of crossings of the Lower Mississippi River
- List of longest bridges
- Huey P. Long Bridge (Baton Rouge)
