= List of memorials to Huey P. Long =

Memorials to Huey P. Long

This is a list of things named after Huey P. Long, the 40th governor of Louisiana (1928-1932) and US Senator (1932-1935).

== Bridges ==
- Huey P. Long Bridge, Baton Rouge
- Huey P. Long Bridge, Jefferson Parish
- Long–Allen Bridge, Harrisonburg
- Long–Allen Bridge, Jonesville
- Long–Allen Bridge, Morgan City
- Long–Allen Bridge, Red River

== Buildings ==
- Huey P. Long Field House, Louisiana State University, Baton Rouge

== Statues ==
- Huey P. Long Grave and Memorial, Baton Rouge, Louisiana
- Huey Long, National Statuary Hall Collection, Washington, D.C.
- Huey Long Statue, Winn Parish Courthouse, Winnfield, Louisiana
