= Bonnet Carré Spillway Bridge =

Bonnet Carré Spillway Bridge may refer to:

- I-10 Bonnet Carré Spillway Bridge
- CNR Bonnet Carré Spillway-McComb Bridge
- U.S. 61 Bonnet Carré Spillway Bridge
- Kansas City Southern Bonnet Carré Spillway Bridge
- CNR Bonnet Carré Spillway-Baton Rouge Bridge
