= List of bridges documented by the Historic American Engineering Record in Louisiana =

This is a list of bridges documented by the Historic American Engineering Record in the U.S. state of Louisiana.

== Bridges ==
Survey No.	Name (as assigned by HAER)	Status	Type	Built	Documented	Carries	Crosses	Location	Parish	Coordinates
LA-7	Krotz Springs Bridge	Replaced	K-truss	1934	1985	US 190	Atchafalaya River	Krotz Springs	St. Landry	30°32′46″N 91°44′59″W
LA-8	Bayou Teche Bridge	Replaced	Swing span	1932	1985	LA 351	Bayou Teche	Ruth	St. Martin	30°14′13″N 91°52′41″W
LA-13	DeSiard Street Bridge	Replaced	Swing span	1899	1997	DeSiard Street	Ouachita River	Monroe	Ouachita	32°30′01″N 92°07′11″W
LA-17	Huey P. Long Bridge	Extant	Cantilever	1935	2005	US 90	Mississippi River	Jefferson	Jefferson	29°56′39″N 90°10′08″W
LA-18	Long–Allen Bridge	Extant	K-truss	1933	2000	US 79 / US 80	Red River	Shreveport	Caddo	32°31′05″N 93°44′33″W
LA-20	Ouachita River Bridge	Demolished	Parker truss	1932	2009	LA 2	Ouachita River	Sterlington	Ouachita	32°41′46″N 92°05′13″W
LA-21	Lake Pontchartrain Causeway & Southern Toll Plaza Bridge	Extant	Trestle	1956	2010	Causeway Boulevard	Lake Pontchartrain	Metairie and Mandeville	Jefferson and St. Tammany	30°11′59″N 90°07′22″W
LA-27	Missouri Pacific Railroad Bridge	Extant	Reinforced concrete girder	1932	2016	US 84	Missouri Pacific Railroad	Tullos	LaSalle	31°49′35″N 92°19′37″W
LA-28	Clarke Bayou Bridge	Extant	Box culvert	1926	2016	US 79 / US 80 westbound	Clarke Bayou	Fillmore	Bossier	32°34′04″N 93°29′08″W
LA-29	Bayou Teche Bridge	Extant	Rolling lift (Scherzer) bascule	1940	2016	LA 86 (Bridge Street)	Bayou Teche	New Iberia	Iberia	30°00′21″N 91°49′01″W
LA-30	Calcasieu River West Fork Bridge	Extant	Vertical-lift bridge	1968	2016	LA 378	Calcasieu River west fork	Moss Bluff	Calcasieu	30°17′49″N 93°14′56″W
LA-31	West Pearl River Bridge	Extant	Vertical-lift bridge	1933	2016	US 90	West Pearl River	Slidell	St. Tammany	30°13′52″N 89°40′07″W
LA-32	Lockport Company Canal Bridge	Extant	Vertical-lift bridge	1959	2016	LA 1 (Crescent Avenue)	Lockport Company Canal	Lockport	Lafourche	29°38′41″N 90°32′40″W
LA-33	Lower Grand River Bridge	Extant	Swing span	1958	2016	LA 997	Lower Grand River	Plaquemine	Iberville	30°04′09″N 91°17′08″W
LA-34	St. Martin Parish Road Bridge	Extant	Swing span	1939	2016	Parish Road 196	Bayou La Rose	Butte La Rose	St. Martin	30°16′55″N 91°44′08″W
LA-35	Terrebonne Parish Road No. 004 Bridge	Extant	Swing span	1959	2016	Parish Road 111	Bayou du Large	Theriot	Terrebonne	29°24′35″N 90°47′11″W
LA-36	Lacombe Bayou Bridge	Extant	Swing span	1938	2016	US 190	Bayou Lacombe	Lacombe	St. Tammany	30°18′50″N 89°56′08″W
LA-37	Bayou Teche at Charenton Bridge	Extant	Swing span	1945	2016	LA 324	Bayou Teche	Charenton	St. Mary	29°53′14″N 91°31′22″W
LA-38	Pass Manchac Bridge	Extant	Steel rolled multi-beam	1957	2016	US 51	Pass Manchac	Akers and Galva	Tangipahoa and St. John the Baptist	30°17′08″N 90°24′04″W
LA-39	Missouri Pacific Railroad Bridge	Extant	Steel rolled multi-beam	1938	2016	US 165	Missouri Pacific Railroad	Bonita	Morehouse	32°53′12″N 91°43′17″W
LA-40	Manchac Bayou Bridge	Extant	Warren truss	1931	2016	LA 73	Bayou Manchac	Baton Rouge and Prairieville	East Baton Rouge and Ascension	30°20′39″N 90°59′00″W
LA-41	Miller's Bluff Bridge	Extant	Warren truss	1955	2016	LA 2	Red River	Plain Dealing and Hosston	Bossier and Caddo	32°53′34″N 93°49′13″W
LA-42	Boeuf River Bridge	Extant	Parker truss	1926	2016	LA 132	Boeuf River	Rayville	Richland	32°18′05″N 91°56′29″W
LA-43	Charenton Bridge	Extant	K-truss	1941	2016	LA 182	Charenton Drainage and Navigation Canal	Baldwin	St. Mary	29°49′31″N 91°32′17″W
LA-49	Illinois Central Railroad, McComb Subdivision, Mainline Bridge 891.5	Extant	Trestle	1935	2018	Canadian National Railway	Bonnet Carré Spillway	Norco and LaPlace	St. Charles and St. John the Baptist	30°03′47″N 90°23′09″W
