= List of state highways in Louisiana (3150–3199) =

List of highways in Louisiana

The following is a list of state highways in the U.S. state of Louisiana designated in the 3150–3199 range.

== Louisiana Highway 3150 ==
Louisiana Highway 3150
- Location: Grand Isle
- Length: 0.29 mi (470 m)
- Existed: 1972–present

Louisiana Highway 3150 (LA 3150) runs 0.29 miles (0.47 km) in a north–south direction along Minnich Lane from LA 1 to a point near Louisiana Avenue, a local road, in Grand Isle, Jefferson Parish. It is an undivided two-lane highway for its entire length.

The route was designated as LA 574-10 prior to 1972, when five digit routes were eliminated by the state highway department.

The entire highway is in Grand Isle, Jefferson Parish.

mi	km	Destinations	Notes
0.0	0.0	LA 1	Southern terminus
0.3	0.48	End state maintenance near Louisiana Avenue	Northern terminus
1.000 mi = 1.609 km; 1.000 km = 0.621 mi

== Louisiana Highway 3151 ==
Louisiana Highway 3151
- Location: Grand Isle
- Length: 1.12 mi (1.80 km)
- Existed: 1972–present

Louisiana Highway 3151 (LA 3151) runs 1.12 miles (1.80 km) in a general north–south direction along Humble Road, looping off of LA 1 in Grand Isle, Jefferson Parish. It is an undivided two-lane highway for its entire length.

The route was designated as LA 574-11 prior to 1972, when five digit routes were eliminated by the state highway department.

The entire highway is in Grand Isle, Jefferson Parish.

mi	km	Destinations	Notes
0.0	0.0	LA 1	Southern terminus
1.1	1.8	LA 1	Northern terminus
1.000 mi = 1.609 km; 1.000 km = 0.621 mi

== Louisiana Highway 3152 ==
Louisiana Highway 3152
- Location: Jefferson Parish
- Length: 4.27 mi (6.87 km)
- Existed: 1972–present

Louisiana Highway 3152 (LA 3152) is a state highway in Louisiana that serves Jefferson Parish. LA 3152 spans 3.8 miles (6.1 km) in a south to north direction and is known locally as South Clearview Parkway and Clearview Parkway.

== Louisiana Highway 3153 ==
Louisiana Highway 3153
- Location: Metairie
- Length: 0.5 mi (800 m)
- Existed: 1972–1980s

Louisiana Highway 3153 (LA 3153) ran 0.5 miles (0.80 km) in a north–south direction along Transcontinental Drive from US 61 (Airline Highway) to West Metairie Avenue in Metairie, Jefferson Parish. It was a divided four-lane highway for its entire length.

Transcontinental Drive began as a main thoroughfare through the Bridgedale subdivision, which opened in 1925 during construction of the Airline Highway between Shrewsbury and Kenner. In 1930, it was designated as State Route 1246 in the pre-1955 Louisiana Highway system. Transcontinental Drive was intended to be extended south to Jefferson Highway (State Route 1) to connect with the Huey P. Long Bridge then in the planning stages. These plans never came to fruition, and the Bridgedale area would not be not directly connected to the bridge for almost fifty years via an extension of Clearview Parkway. State Route 1246 became LA 611-11 in the 1955 Louisiana Highway renumbering and assumed its present number in 1972. The route was returned to local control by 1986.

The entire highway was in Metairie, Jefferson Parish.

mi	km	Destinations	Notes
0.0	0.0	US 61 (Airline Highway)	Southern terminus
0.5	0.80	West Metairie Avenue	Northern terminus
1.000 mi = 1.609 km; 1.000 km = 0.621 mi

== Louisiana Highway 3154 ==
Louisiana Highway 3154
- Location: Harahan–Metairie
- Length: 3.16 mi (5.09 km)
- Existed: 1972–present

Louisiana Highway 3154 (LA 3154) runs 3.16 miles (5.09 km) in a north–south direction from LA 48 in Harahan to US 61 in Metairie, Jefferson Parish.

The route initially heads north on Hickory Avenue, an undivided two-lane thoroughfare, from LA 48 (Jefferson Highway) in Harahan. At Roberts Street, signs direct traffic onto Dickory Avenue, a parallel divided four-lane thoroughfare, to continue north on LA 3154. Officially, the route leaves Hickory Avenue further north via Gardner Street (also the connector for southbound traffic), requiring a U-turn before proceeding north on Dickory Avenue. Now outside the Harahan city limits, LA 3154 intersects LA 3139 (Earhart Expressway) and proceeds across the Canadian National Railway (CN) tracks via an overpass into Metairie. The highway proceeds a short distance further to its terminus at US 61 (Airline Drive).

LA 3154 was designated as LA 611-12 prior to 1972, when five digit routes were eliminated by the state highway department. The route originally followed Hickory Avenue for its entire length and crossed what was then the Illinois Central Railroad (IC) line at grade. Construction began in 1974 on a four-lane bypass of Hickory Avenue that would include a railroad overpass and an interchange with the future Earhart Expressway. The new alignment, Dickory Avenue, opened in December 1975 and extended from Citrus Road to Airline Highway (now Airline Drive). Almost two decades later, Dickory Avenue was extended slightly to the south, providing better access to the Elmwood Business Park. In 2003, a further extension continued the road to its present terminus just south of 9th Street, providing another route into the Elmwood Business Park via an extension of Mounes Street. Plans are underway to extend the road to Jefferson Highway and bypass the remainder of Hickory Avenue.

The entire highway is in Jefferson Parish.

Location	mi	km	Destinations	Notes
Harahan	0.0	0.0	LA 48 (Jefferson Highway)	Southern terminus
Elmwood	2.4	3.9	LA 3139 south (Earhart Expressway) – New Orleans	Northern terminus of LA 3139
Metairie	3.3	5.3	US 61 (Airline Drive) – Kenner, New Orleans	Northern terminus
1.000 mi = 1.609 km; 1.000 km = 0.621 mi

== Louisiana Highway 3155 ==
Louisiana Highway 3155
- Location: River Ridge–Metairie
- Length: 0.50 mi (800 m)
- Existed: 1972–present

Louisiana Highway 3155 (LA 3155) runs 0.50 miles (0.80 km) in a north–south direction along Little Farms Avenue from Russell Avenue in River Ridge to a junction with US 61 (Airline Drive) in Metairie. It crosses the Canadian National Railway line at grade at its southern end and is an undivided two-lane highway for its entire length.

Little Farms Avenue is the main thoroughfare of the J. H. Little Farms residential subdivision opened in 1925. The subdivision was laid out alongside the Jefferson Highway (State Route 1 in the pre-1955 Louisiana highway system) and adjacent streetcar line operated by the Orleans-Kenner Traction Company. Little Farms Avenue was soon extended across the railroad tracks to connect with the newly constructed Airline Highway. In 1954, the Bunche Village residential subdivision opened adjacent to Little Farms Avenue between the railroad tracks and Airline Highway.

Little Farms Avenue was originally designated as State Route 2220 in the pre-1955 system and included the entire length of the road from Jefferson Highway to Airline Highway (now Airline Drive). It became LA 611-13 in the 1955 Louisiana Highway renumbering, but in 1972, the route was renumbered to LA 3155 and retained only the section of Little Farms Avenue north of the railroad tracks.

The entire highway is in Jefferson Parish.

Location	mi	km	Destinations	Notes
River Ridge	0.0	0.0	Russell Street	Southern terminus
Metairie	0.35	0.56	US 61 (Airline Drive)	Northern terminus
1.000 mi = 1.609 km; 1.000 km = 0.621 mi

== Louisiana Highway 3156 ==
Louisiana Highway 3156
- Location: New Iberia
- Length: 0.21 mi (340 m)
- Existed: c. 1972–present

Louisiana Highway 3156 (LA 3156) is a short state-maintained section of Jefferson Street in downtown New Iberia within Iberia Parish. The 0.21-mile-long (0.34 km) highway begins at West St. Peter Street (carrying eastbound LA 182) and travels northeast past a church, school, and a house. After crossing West Main Street (westbound LA 182), it crosses Bayou Teche on the Joe Daigre Bridge, a swing bridge opened in 2014. State maintenance ends just past the bridge at the intersection of Front Street and Indest Street.

== Louisiana Highway 3158 ==
Louisiana Highway 3158
- Location: Hammond
- Length: 2.29 mi (3.69 km)
- Existed: 1970s–present

Louisiana Highway 3158 (LA 3158) runs 2.29 miles (3.69 km) in a north–south direction along South Airport Road from I-12 southeast of Hammond to US 190 in Hammond, Tangipahoa Parish.

The route connects I-12 (Exit 42) with the Hammond Northshore Regional Airport east of downtown Hammond. Outside of the diamond interchange with I-12, LA 3158 is an undivided two-lane highway for its entire length. At about the midpoint of its route, LA 3158 intersects Old Covington Highway, a local road formerly designated as LA 1067. The intersection was converted from a four-way stop to a roundabout in 2010.

The entire highway is in Tangipahoa Parish.

Location	mi	km	Destinations	Notes
	0.0	0.0	I-12 – Hammond, Slidell	Southern terminus at exit 42
Hammond	2.3	3.7	US 190	Northern terminus; to Hammond Northshore Regional Airport/Louisiana National Guard
1.000 mi = 1.609 km; 1.000 km = 0.621 mi

== Louisiana Highway 3159 ==
Louisiana Highway 3159
- Location: La Salle Parish
- Length: 3.24 mi (5.21 km)

Louisiana Highway 3159 (LA 3159) runs 3.24 miles (5.21 km) in La Salle Parish.

== Louisiana Highway 3160 ==
Louisiana Highway 3160
- Location: Hahnville
- Length: 2.36 mi (3.80 km)
- Existed: c. 1975–present

Louisiana Highway 3160 (LA 3160) runs 2.36 miles (3.80 km) in an east–west direction along Home Place from LA 3127 to LA 18 in Hahnville, St. Charles Parish.

The route connects Hahnville, the parish seat, with LA 3127, a highway constructed in the 1970s that bypasses the various communities along the west bank of the Mississippi River between Luling and Donaldsonville. It is an undivided two-lane highway for its entire length.

The entire highway is in St. Charles Parish.

Location	mi	km	Destinations	Notes
	0.0	0.0	LA 3127	Western terminus
Hahnville	2.3	3.7	LA 18 (River Road)	Eastern terminus
1.000 mi = 1.609 km; 1.000 km = 0.621 mi

== Louisiana Highway 3161 ==
Louisiana Highway 3161
- Location: Cut Off
- Length: 0.73 mi (1,170 m)
- Existed: c. 1975–present

Louisiana Highway 3161 (LA 3161) runs 0.73 miles (1.17 km) in an east–west direction from LA 3235 to LA 1 in Cut Off, Lafourche Parish. The route is a short connector between LA 1 and its four-lane bypass, LA 3235. It is also signed as the Cote Blanche Connection and is an undivided two-lane highway for its entire length.

The entire highway is in Cut Off, Lafourche Parish.

mi	km	Destinations	Notes
0.0	0.0	LA 3235	Western terminus
0.7	1.1	LA 1	Eastern terminus
1.000 mi = 1.609 km; 1.000 km = 0.621 mi

== Louisiana Highway 3162 ==
Louisiana Highway 3162
- Location: Galliano
- Length: 0.70 mi (1,130 m)
- Existed: c. 1975–present

Louisiana Highway 3162 (LA 3162) runs 0.70 miles (1.13 km) in an east–west direction from LA 3235 to LA 308 in Galliano, Lafourche Parish. The route is a short connector between LA 1 and its four-lane bypass, LA 3235. It extends east across Bayou Lafourche by way of a vertical lift bridge, connecting LA 1 and LA 308, which travel along opposite banks of the bayou. LA 3162 is an undivided two-lane highway for its entire length.

The entire highway is in Galliano, Lafourche Parish.

mi	km	Destinations	Notes
0.0	0.0	LA 3235	Western terminus
0.6	0.97	LA 1	
0.7	1.1	Bridge over Bayou Lafourche	
0.7	1.1	LA 308	Eastern terminus
1.000 mi = 1.609 km; 1.000 km = 0.621 mi

== Louisiana Highway 3163 ==
Louisiana Highway 3163
- Location: Kraft
- Length: 2.58 mi (4.15 km)

Louisiana Highway 3163 (LA 3163) runs 2.58 miles (4.15 km) in Kraft.

== Louisiana Highway 3164 ==
Louisiana Highway 3164
- Location: Baton Rouge
- Length: 1.03 mi (1.66 km)

Louisiana Highway 3164 (LA 3164) runs 1.03 miles (1.66 km) in Baton Rouge.

== Louisiana Highway 3165 ==
Louisiana Highway 3165
- Location: Catahoula Parish
- Length: 1.36 mi (2.19 km)

Louisiana Highway 3165 (LA 3165) runs 1.36 miles (2.19 km) in Catahoula Parish.

== Louisiana Highway 3166 ==
Louisiana Highway 3166
- Location: Jefferson Davis Parish
- Length: 1.81 mi (2.91 km)
- Existed: 1970s–present

Louisiana Highway 3166 (LA 3166) runs 1.81 miles (2.91 km) in a north–south direction from a cul-de-sac alongside the Mermentau River to a junction with LA 1126 south of Jennings, Jefferson Davis Parish.

The entire route is in Jefferson Davis Parish.

mi	km	Destinations	Notes
0.0	0.0	Begin state maintenance	Southern terminus
1.8	2.9	LA 1126	Northern terminus
1.000 mi = 1.609 km; 1.000 km = 0.621 mi

== Louisiana Highway 3168 ==
Louisiana Highway 3168
- Location: Scott
- Length: 0.67 mi (1,080 m)
- Existed: c. 1979–present

Louisiana Highway 3168 (LA 3168) runs 0.67 miles (1.08 km) in a north–south direction from US 90 to a point just south of I-10 in Scott, Lafayette Parish. The route is entirely co-signed with LA 93.

LA 3168 heads north from US 90 along Apollo Road. Upon reaching a roundabout intersection with St. Mary Street, the town's main north–south thoroughfare, the LA 3168 designation ends. LA 93 continues immediately through an interchange with I-10 at Exit 97.

LA 3168 was constructed around 1979 as a truck route for LA 93, which followed St. Mary Street through the center of town. It became the actual route of LA 93 when St. Mary Street was subsequently returned to local control. However, the LA 3168 designation remains and is entirely co-signed with the portion of LA 93 on Apollo Road.

The entire highway is in Scott, Lafayette Parish.

mi	km	Destinations	Notes
0.0	0.0	US 90 / LA 93 south	Southern terminus; south end of LA 93 concurrency
0.7	1.1	LA 93 north	Northern terminus; north end of LA 93 concurrency
1.000 mi = 1.609 km; 1.000 km = 0.621 mi: Concurrency terminus

== Louisiana Highway 3169 ==
Louisiana Highway 3169
- Location: Colfax
- Length: 1.04 mi (1.67 km)

Louisiana Highway 3169 (LA 3169) is an approximate one-mile-long (1.6 km) highway located east of Colfax, Grant Parish. It travels between LA 8 and US 71/LA 8 through a mostly wooded area. The road has been discontinuous since October 2010 as the bridge over the Bayou Rigolette is closed.

== Louisiana Highway 3170 ==
Louisiana Highway 3170
- Location: Chambers–Whittington
- Length: 5.53 mi (8.90 km)

Louisiana Highway 3170 (LA 3170) runs 5.53 miles (8.90 km) from Chambers to Whittington.

== Louisiana Highway 3173 ==
Louisiana Highway 3173
- Location: Krotz Springs
- Length: 1.26 mi (2.03 km)
- Existed: c. 1973–present

Louisiana Highway 3173 (LA 3173) runs 1.26 miles (2.03 km) in a general north–south direction through Krotz Springs, St. Landry Parish.

The route begins at LA 105 (South Levee Road) and proceeds west along 2nd Street. It then turns north onto 9th Avenue, crosses the Union Pacific Railroad (UP) tracks, and intersects LA 3174 (Main Street). LA 3173 turns east onto Main Street for one block then north onto 8th Avenue to an intersection with LA 3178 (Florida Street). Here, LA 3173 turns west and reaches its terminus at US 190 just west of the Krotz Springs Bridge over the Atchafalaya River. LA 3173 is an undivided two-lane highway for its entire length.

The upper section of LA 3173 was formerly part of LA 105 before the construction of the current westbound bridge span caused a slight realignment of that route. LA 3173 was added to the state highway system around 1973, and its route has remained the same to the present day.

The entire highway is in Krotz Springs, St. Landry Parish.

mi	km	Destinations	Notes
0.0	0.0	LA 105 (South Levee Road)	Southern terminus
0.6	0.97	LA 3174 (Main Street) to US 190	Eastern terminus of LA 3174
1.2	1.9	LA 3178 (Florida Street)	Western terminus of LA 3178
1.3	2.1	US 190 – Opelousas, Baton Rouge	Northern terminus
1.000 mi = 1.609 km; 1.000 km = 0.621 mi

== Louisiana Highway 3174 ==
Louisiana Highway 3174
- Location: Krotz Springs
- Length: 0.92 mi (1,480 m)
- Existed: c. 1973–present

Louisiana Highway 3174 (LA 3174) runs 0.92 miles (1.48 km) in an east–west direction along Main Street in Krotz Springs, St. Landry Parish.

The route begins at US 190 and heads south briefly before curving to the east. It enters the town of Krotz Springs and proceeds to a terminus at LA 3173 (9th Avenue). LA 3174 is an undivided two-lane highway for its entire length. Truck traffic from the industrial area south of town is directed onto LA 3174 to reach westbound US 190.

In the pre-1955 state highway system, LA 3174 was part of State Route 7. After the 1955 Louisiana Highway renumbering, it became part of the original route of LA 105. LA 3174 was created when construction of the current westbound span of the Krotz Springs Bridge caused a slight realignment of LA 105 in the early 1970s.

The entire highway is in Krotz Springs, St. Landry Parish.

mi	km	Destinations	Notes
0.0	0.0	US 190 – Opelousas, Baton Rouge	Western terminus
0.9	1.4	LA 3173 (9th Avenue)	Eastern terminus
1.000 mi = 1.609 km; 1.000 km = 0.621 mi

== Louisiana Highway 3175 ==
Louisiana Highway 3175
- Location: Natchitoches
- Existed: 1980–1994

Louisiana Highway 3175 (LA 3175) was a Louisiana state highway that was located in northern Natchitoches. The highway was constructed around 1980, connecting LA 6 with the newly constructed LA 1 bypass (originally designated as LA 3110). LA 3175 was removed from the state highway system in 1994 when LA 6 was re-routed onto the LA 1 Natchitoches bypass.

== Louisiana Highway 3177 ==
Louisiana Highway 3177
- Location: Butte La Rose–Atchafalaya
- Length: 5.87 mi (9.45 km)

Louisiana Highway 3177 (LA 3177) runs 5.87 miles (9.45 km) from Butte La Rose to Atchafalaya.

== Louisiana Highway 3178 ==
Louisiana Highway 3178
- Location: Krotz Springs
- Length: 0.23 mi (370 m)
- Existed: c. 1973–present

Louisiana Highway 3178 (LA 3178) runs 0.23 miles (0.37 km) in an east–west direction along Florida Street in Krotz Springs, St. Landry Parish.

The route begins at the intersection of Florida Street and 8th Avenue, a junction with LA 3173, and proceeds east to LA 105 (North Levee Road). It provides a more direct connection between US 190 and LA 105 at the west end of the Krotz Springs Bridge over the Atchafalaya River. It is an undivided two-lane highway for its entire length.

LA 3178 connects the original and current alignments of LA 105, which was slightly realigned in the early 1970s when the current westbound span of the Krotz Springs Bridge was constructed.

The entire highway is in Krotz Springs, St. Landry Parish.

mi	km	Destinations	Notes
0.0	0.0	LA 3173 (Florida Street, 9th Avenue)	Western terminus
0.2	0.32	LA 105 (North Levee Road)	Eastern terminus
1.000 mi = 1.609 km; 1.000 km = 0.621 mi

== Louisiana Highway 3179 ==
Louisiana Highway 3179
- Location: Reserve
- Length: 1.86 mi (2.99 km)
- Existed: 1970s–present

Louisiana Highway 3179 (LA 3179) runs 1.86 miles (2.99 km) in a north–south direction from LA 44 to US 61 in Reserve, St. John the Baptist Parish.

The entire highway is in Reserve, St. John the Baptist Parish.

mi	km	Destinations	Notes
0.0	0.0	LA 44	Southern terminus
1.9	3.1	US 61 (Airline Highway)	Northern terminus
1.000 mi = 1.609 km; 1.000 km = 0.621 mi

== Louisiana Highway 3180 ==
Louisiana Highway 3180
- Location: Taconey–Vidalia
- Length: 2.16 mi (3.48 km)

Louisiana Highway 3180 (LA 3180) runs 2.16 miles (3.48 km) from Taconey to Vidalia.

== Louisiana Highway 3181 ==
Louisiana Highway 3181
- Location: Lake Providence
- Length: 2.88 mi (4.63 km)

Louisiana Highway 3181 (LA 3181) runs 2.88 miles (4.63 km) in Lake Providence.

== Louisiana Highway 3182 ==
Louisiana Highway 3182
- Location: Jeanerette
- Length: 0.16 mi (260 m)
- Existed: 1980–present

Louisiana Highway 3182 (LA 3182) runs 0.16 miles (0.26 km) in an east–west direction from LA 182 to LA 87 in Jeanerette, Iberia Parish. It connects the two routes by way of a swing bridge across Bayou Teche constructed in 1980.

The entire highway is in Jeanerette, Iberia Parish.

mi	km	Destinations	Notes
0.0	0.0	LA 182 (Main Street)	Western terminus
0.1	0.16	Bridge over Bayou Teche	
0.2	0.32	LA 87	Eastern terminus
1.000 mi = 1.609 km; 1.000 km = 0.621 mi

== Louisiana Highway 3184 ==
Louisiana Highway 3184
- Location: Lafayette
- Length: 2.19 mi (3.52 km)
- Existed: 1980s–present

Louisiana Highway 3184 (LA 3184) runs 2.19 miles (3.52 km) in a north–south direction from LA 3025 to I-10 in Lafayette, Lafayette Parish. It is a largely commercial corridor that connects I-10 with Cajun Field, the Cajundome Convention Center, and Lafayette's southwest suburbs.

The route heads northwest on Bertrand Drive from LA 3025 then curves due north onto Ambassador Caffery Parkway. Shortly afterward, LA 3184 intersects US 90 (Cameron Street). The highway then crosses the BNSF/Union Pacific Railroad (UP) tracks by way of an overpass and proceeds to an interchange with I-10 at Exit 100. LA 3184 is a divided four-lane highway for its entire length.

The entire highway is in Lafayette, Lafayette Parish.

mi	km	Destinations	Notes
0.0	0.0	LA 3025 (Bertrand Drive)	Southern terminus
1.0	1.6	US 90 (Cameron Street)	
1.8– 2.2	2.9– 3.5	I-10 – Baton Rouge, Lake Charles	Northern terminus; exit 100 on I-10
1.000 mi = 1.609 km; 1.000 km = 0.621 mi

== Louisiana Highway 3185 ==
Louisiana Highway 3185
- Location: Thibodaux–Schriever
- Length: 5.26 mi (8.47 km)
- Existed: 1980s–present

Louisiana Highway 3185 (LA 3185) runs 5.26 miles (8.47 km) in a northwest to southeast direction from LA 308 west of Thibodaux, Lafourche Parish to LA 20 in Schriever, Terrebonne Parish. The route is generally known as West Thibodaux Bypass Road.

LA 3185 initially heads southwest from LA 308 (Bayou Road), immediately crossing Bayou Lafourche and intersecting LA 1. After curving to the southeast, LA 3185 crosses from Lafourche Parish into Terrebonne Parish. The highway terminates soon afterward at LA 20 in Schriever. It is an undivided two-lane highway for its entire length.

Parish	Location	mi	km	Destinations	Notes
Lafourche		0.0	0.0	LA 308 (Bayou Road) – Donaldsonville, Thibodaux	Northwestern terminus
Lafourche		0.0	0.0	Bridge over Bayou Lafourche	
Lafourche		0.0	0.0	LA 1 – Donaldsonville, Thibodaux	
Terrebonne	Schriever	5.3	8.5	LA 20 (West Main Street, West Park Avenue) – Thibodaux	Southeastern terminus
1.000 mi = 1.609 km; 1.000 km = 0.621 mi

== Louisiana Highway 3186 ==
Louisiana Highway 3186
- Location: Lake Charles
- Length: 2.04 mi (3.28 km)

Louisiana Highway 3186 (LA 3186) runs 2.04 miles (3.28 km) in Lake Charles.

== Louisiana Highway 3187 ==
Louisiana Highway 3187
- Location: Pine Prairie–Turkey Creek
- Length: 9.76 mi (15.71 km)

Louisiana Highway 3187 (LA 3187) runs 9.76 miles (15.71 km) from Pine Prairie to Turkey Creek.

== Louisiana Highway 3188 ==
Louisiana Highway 3188
- Location: LaPlace
- Length: 2.80 mi (4.51 km)
- Existed: c. 1983–present

Louisiana Highway 3188 (LA 3188) runs 2.80 miles (4.51 km) in a north–south direction from US 61 to I-10 in LaPlace, St. John the Baptist Parish. It is one of two highways that connect LaPlace to the interstate.

LA 3188 heads north from US 61 (West Airline Highway) on Belle Terre Boulevard, a divided four-lane commercial thoroughfare. There are four signalized intersections along the route: US 61, a shopping strip entrance, Fairway Drive, and St. Andrews Boulevard. Just north of the latter, LA 3188 enters an undeveloped area at the north end of LaPlace. The highway curves to the northeast, engaging in a trumpet interchange with I-10 at Exit 206, connecting to New Orleans and Baton Rouge.

The highway was constructed in the early 1980s and involved re-routing and extending the existing Belle Terre Boulevard to I-10. The original alignment curved northeast onto what is now Lakewood Drive, ending at the Belle Terre Country Club.

The entire highway is in LaPlace, St. John the Baptist Parish.

mi	km	Destinations	Notes
0.0	0.0	US 61 (West Airline Highway)	Southern terminus
2.8	4.5	I-10 – New Orleans, Baton Rouge	Northern terminus; exit 206 on I-10
1.000 mi = 1.609 km; 1.000 km = 0.621 mi

== Louisiana Highway 3190 ==
Louisiana Highway 3190
- Location: Angola Ferry
- Length: 0.41 mi (660 m)

Louisiana Highway 3190 (LA 3190) runs 0.41 miles (0.66 km) to the Angola Ferry.

== Louisiana Highway 3191 ==
Louisiana Highway 3191
- Location: Calvert Acres–Natchitoches
- Length: 3.28 mi (5.28 km)
- Existed: 1975–present

Louisiana Highway 3191 (LA 3191) runs 3.28 miles (5.28 km) from Calvert Acres to Natchitoches. From the highway's southern terminus at LA 1/LA 6/LA 1 Bus. to the intersection at LA 504, LA 3191 forms the northern segment of a loop around Sibley Lake.

LA 3191 was designated in 1975 along an old routing of LA 1 when that road was re-rerouted onto a new bypass around the central business district of Natchitoches.

The entire route is in Natchitoches Parish.

Location	mi	km	Destinations	Notes
Natchitoches	0.0	0.0	LA 1 / LA 6 (Highway 3110) / LA 1 Bus. south (Texas Avenue)	
	2.1	3.4	LA 504 west	
	3.3	5.3	LA 1	
1.000 mi = 1.609 km; 1.000 km = 0.621 mi

== Louisiana Highway 3193 ==
Louisiana Highway 3193
- Location: Lutcher
- Length: 1.62 mi (2.61 km)
- Existed: 1980s–present

Louisiana Highway 3193 (LA 3193) runs 1.62 miles (2.61 km) in a north–south direction from LA 44 to LA 3125 in Lutcher, St. James Parish.

From the south, LA 3193 begins at LA 44, which follows the east bank levee of the Mississippi River. It proceeds northwest on Lutcher Avenue, an undivided two-lane residential thoroughfare. Just after crossing the Canadian National Railway (CN) tracks at grade, the highway intersects LA 641 (West Main Street). LA 3193 continues past St. James Parish Hospital and widens to a divided four-lane highway shortly before reaching its terminus at LA 3125.

The entire highway is in Lutcher, St. James Parish.

mi	km	Destinations	Notes
0.0	0.0	LA 44 (Jefferson Highway)	Southern terminus
0.3	0.48	LA 641 (West Main Street)	
1.6	2.6	LA 3125	Northern terminus
1.000 mi = 1.609 km; 1.000 km = 0.621 mi

== Louisiana Highway 3194 ==
Louisiana Highway 3194
- Location: Shreveport
- Length: 3.54 mi (5.70 km)
- Existed: 1980s–present

Louisiana Highway 3194 (LA 3194) runs 3.54 miles (5.70 km) in an east–west direction from LA 173 to the concurrent US 71/LA 1 in Shreveport.

The entire highway is in Shreveport, Caddo Parish.

mi	km	Destinations	Notes
0.0	0.0	LA 173 (Shreveport-Blanchard Highway)	Western terminus
2.6– 3.2	4.2– 5.1	I-49 – Shreveport, Texarkana	Exit 211 on I-49
3.6	5.8	US 71 / LA 1 (North Market Street)	Eastern terminus
1.000 mi = 1.609 km; 1.000 km = 0.621 mi

== Louisiana Highway 3195 ==
Louisiana Highway 3195
- Location: New Iberia
- Length: 1.82 mi (2.93 km)
- Existed: 1980s–present

Louisiana Highway 3195 (LA 3195) runs 1.82 miles (2.93 km) in a north–south direction from LA 182 to the junction of LA 86 and LA 344 east of New Iberia, Iberia Parish.

The entire highway is in Iberia Parish.

Location	mi	km	Destinations	Notes
	0.0	0.0	LA 182	Southern terminus
	0.1	0.16	Bridge over Bayou Teche	
	0.3	0.48	LA 87	
Morbihan	1.8	2.9	LA 86 / LA 344	Northern terminus
1.000 mi = 1.609 km; 1.000 km = 0.621 mi

== Louisiana Highway 3196 ==
Louisiana Highway 3196
- Location: Ridgecrest–Spokane
- Length: 11.40 mi (18.35 km)

Louisiana Highway 3196 (LA 3196) runs 11.40 miles (18.35 km) from Ridgecrest to Spokane. It is a partially unpaved route with no major junctions apart from its endpoints at US 425/84 and LA 569.

== Louisiana Highway 3197 ==
Louisiana Highway 3197
- Location: Houma
- Length: 0.49 mi (790 m)
- Existed: c. 1977–present

Louisiana Highway 3197 (LA 3197) runs 0.49 miles (0.79 km) in a southwest to northeast direction along Bayou Black Drive between two points on LA 182 in Houma, Terrebonne Parish. It is a discontinuous remnant of the original alignment of US 90 through the area.

From the southwest, LA 3197 begins at a junction with LA 182 and LA 315 at the intersection of Bayou Black Drive and Barrow Street. It proceeds northeast on Bayou Black Drive alongside the Houma Golf Course. At the intersection of Bayou Black Drive with Country Club Drive and Mulberry Road, LA 3197 turns northwest and shortly reaches a dead end at the former location of the Houma Canal bridge. The route resumes on the north side of the canal and proceeds northwest a short distance to its terminus at LA 182 (Barrow Street) opposite the concurrent LA 311 and LA 312.

LA 3197 is an undivided two-lane highway for its entire length.

The entire highway is in Houma, Terrebonne Parish.

mi	km	Destinations	Notes
0.0	0.0	LA 182 (Bayou Black Drive, Barrow Street) LA 315 south	Southwestern terminus of LA 3197; northern terminus of LA 315
Gap in LA 3197 at former location of Houma Canal Bridge
0.5	0.80	LA 182 (Barrow Street); LA 311 / LA 312 (Little Bayou Black Drive)	Northeastern terminus of LA 3197; southern terminus of LA 311 and LA 312
1.000 mi = 1.609 km; 1.000 km = 0.621 mi

== Louisiana Highway 3198 ==
Louisiana Highway 3198
- Location: Raceland
- Length: 3.3 mi (5.3 km)
- Existed: c. 1977–c. 1997

Louisiana Highway 3198 (LA 3198) ran 3.3 miles (5.3 km) in a southwest to northeast direction along what is now LA 182 connecting Raceland with US 90 in Lafourche Parish. LA 3198 was part of the original alignment of US 90 before the Raceland bypass was opened in the late 1970s.

From the southwest, LA 3198 began at an interchange with US 90 (Exit 210) and LA 3052 (now also part of US 90). It proceeded northeast along the present LA 182, intersecting LA 653 and LA 652 on the way to Raceland. LA 3198 reached its terminus at LA 1 in Raceland opposite Bayou Lafourche.

The entire highway was in Lafourche Parish.

Location	mi	km	Destinations	Notes
	0.0	0.0	US 90 / LA 3052 – Houma, New Orleans	Southwestern terminus
	1.2	1.9	LA 653	Northern terminus of LA 653
Raceland	1.9	3.1	LA 652 (Buford Street)	Northern terminus of LA 652
Raceland	3.3	5.3	LA 1 – Thibodaux, Larose	Northeastern terminus
1.000 mi = 1.609 km; 1.000 km = 0.621 mi

== Louisiana Highway 3199 ==
Louisiana Highway 3199
- Location: Raceland
- Length: 3.6 mi (5.8 km)
- Existed: c. 1977–c. 1997

Louisiana Highway 3199 (LA 3199) ran 3.6 miles (5.8 km) in a southwest to northeast direction along what is now LA 182 connecting Raceland with US 90 in Lafourche Parish. LA 3198 was part of the original alignment of US 90 before the Raceland bypass was opened in the late 1970s.

From the southwest, LA 3199 began at an intersection with LA 1 on the south side (west bank) of Bayou Lafourche. It proceeded northeast along the present LA 182, intersecting LA 307 along the northeastern tip of Raceland. LA 3199 reached its terminus shortly thereafter at US 90 alongside the BNSF/Union Pacific Railroad (UP) tracks.

The entire highway was in Lafourche Parish.

Location	mi	km	Destinations	Notes
Raceland	0.0	0.0	LA 1 – Thibodaux, Larose	Southwestern terminus
Raceland	0.0	0.0	Bridge over Bayou Lafourche	
Raceland	0.1	0.16	LA 308 – Thibodaux, Larose	
Raceland	3.2	5.1	LA 307 – Bayou Boeuf	Southern terminus of LA 307
	3.6	5.8	US 90 – Houma, New Orleans	Northeastern terminus
1.000 mi = 1.609 km; 1.000 km = 0.621 mi
