= Bonnet Carré =

Bonnet Carré may refer to:

- Bonnet Carré Spillway, a flood control structure in Louisiana
- Bonnet Carré Crevasse, 1871 Mississippi River levee failure and associated flood
