= Montz, Louisiana =

Montz
- Census-designated place
- Location of Montz in Louisiana
- Coordinates: 30°01′07″N 90°27′02″W
- Country: United States
- State: Louisiana
- Parish: St. Charles

Area
  - Total: 2.81 sq mi (7.29 km^{2})
  - Land: 2.16 sq mi (5.59 km^{2})
  - Water: 0.66 sq mi (1.70 km^{2})
- Elevation: 10 ft (3.0 m)

Population (2020)
  - Total: 2,106
  - Density: 975.0/sq mi (376.46/km^{2})
- Time zone: UTC-6 (CST)
  - Summer (DST): UTC-5 (CDT)
- Area code: 985
- FIPS code: 22-51795
- GNIS feature ID: 2403304

Montz is a census-designated place (CDP) in St. Charles Parish, Louisiana, United States. It first appeared in the 2000 census with a population of 1,120. The 2020 census indicates a population of 2,106.

== History ==
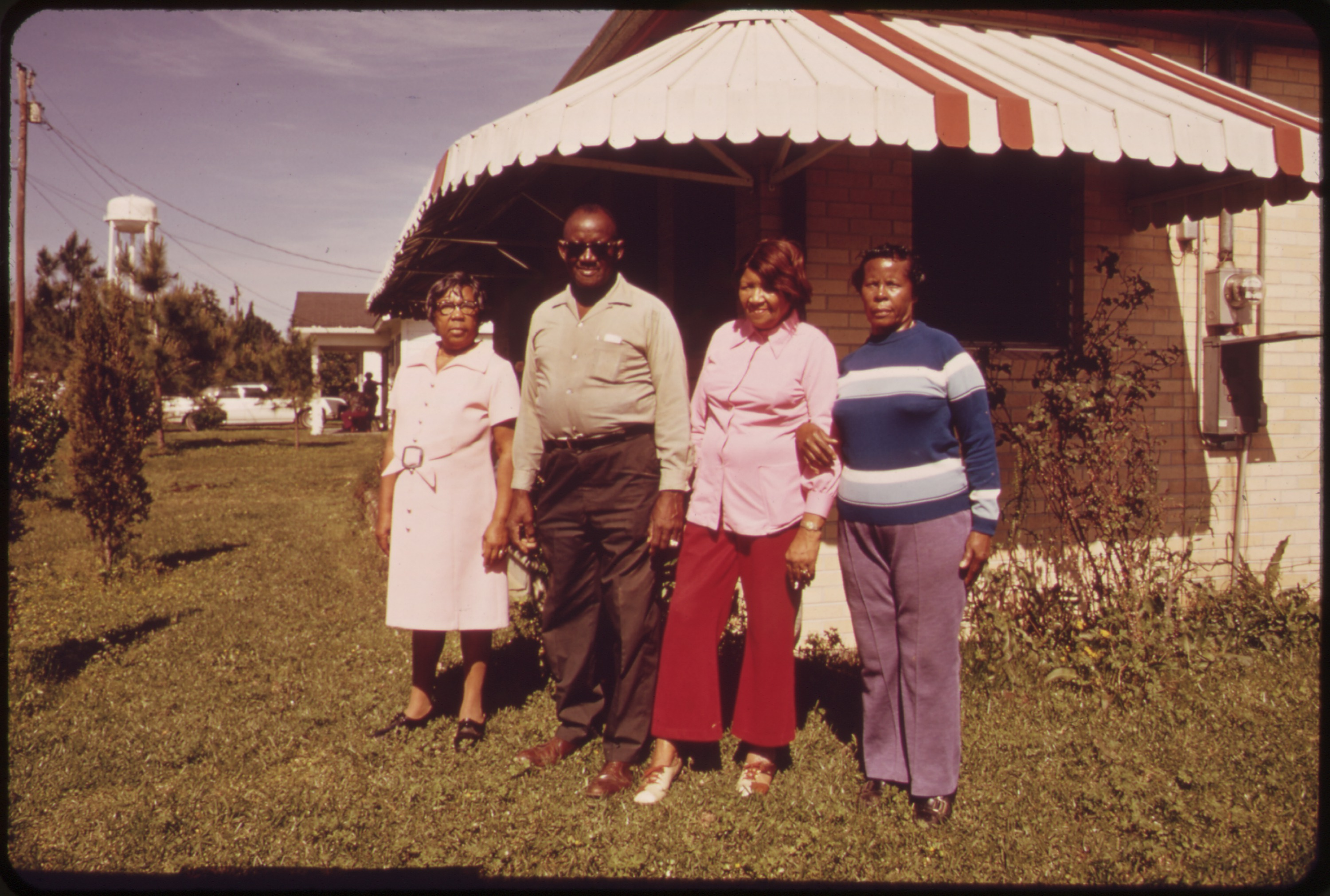
One of 36 families in Montz whose houses were appropriated by the U.S. Army Corps of Engineers in 1973 for construction of a new levee.

The Bonnet Carré Crevasse occurred in and near the present-day location of Montz. It was one of several levee breaches in the Bonnet Carré area in the mid-to-late-1800s. Bonnet Carré was approximately 50 kilometers from New Orleans, Louisiana. The breach occurred when excess water from the Mississippi River flowed over the east bank levee of Bonnet Carré.

Montz is located between LaPlace, Louisiana and the Bonnet Carré Spillway. It was separated from the other municipalities and communities on the east bank of the Mississippi River in St. Charles Parish by the construction of the spillway, which was completed in 1931.

On December 14, 2022, the town was hit by a destructive and deadly EF2 tornado that damaged or destroyed numerous structures, killed one person, and injured eight others.

== Geography ==
Montz is located at 30°1′7″N 90°27′2″W (30.018513, -90.450683).

According to the United States Census Bureau, the CDP has a total area of 3.5 square miles (9.1 km^{2}), of which 2.8 square miles (7.3 km^{2}) is land and 0.7 square miles (1.8 km^{2}) (19.66%) is water.

== Demographics ==
Historical population
Census	Pop.	Note	%±
2000	1,120		—
2010	1,918		71.3%
2020	2,106		9.8%
U.S. Decennial Census; 2000 2010 2020

Montz was first listed as a census designated place in the 2000 U.S. census.

Montz CDP, Louisiana – Racial and ethnic composition Note: the U.S. Census Bureau treats Hispanic/Latino as an ethnic category. This table excludes Latinos from the racial categories and assigns them to a separate category. Hispanics/Latinos may be of any race.
Race / Ethnicity (NH = Non-Hispanic)	Pop 2000	Pop 2010	Pop 2020	% 2000	% 2010	% 2020
White alone (NH)	896	1,511	1,564	80.00%	78.78%	74.26%
Black or African American alone (NH)	199	309	310	17.77%	16.11%	14.72%
Native American or Alaska Native alone (NH)	2	1	14	0.18%	0.05%	0.66%
Asian alone (NH)	5	11	9	0.45%	0.57%	0.43%
Pacific Islander alone (NH)	0	0	0	0.00%	0.00%	0.00%
Some Other Race alone (NH)	2	2	16	0.18%	0.10%	0.76%
Mixed Race or Multi-Racial (NH)	5	10	75	0.45%	0.52%	3.56%
Hispanic or Latino (any race)	11	74	118	0.98%	3.86%	5.60%
Total	1,120	1,918	2,106	100.00%	100.00%	100.00%

In 2020, its population was 2,106, up from 1,918 at the 2010 census. Among its population in 2020, 74.26% were non-Hispanic white, 14.72% African American, 0.66% Native American, 0.43% Asian, 0.76% other, 3.56% multiracial, and 5.60% Hispanic or Latino of any race.

== Education ==
St. Charles Parish Public School System operates public schools, including:

- Destrehan High School in Destrehan
