= Atchafalaya, Louisiana =

Atchafalaya
- Ghost Town
- Location within the state of Louisiana
- Coordinates: 30°20′41.8″N 91°43′17.3″W
- Country: United States
- State: Louisiana
- Parish: St. Martin
- Time zone: UTC-6 (Central (CST))
  - Summer (DST): UTC-5 (CDT)

Atchafalaya is a ghost town that was located in St. Martin Parish, approximately 6 miles north of Butte La Rose, Louisiana, United States and just north of I-10 on the Atchafalaya River. The site of the town itself is located at coordinates 30°20'41.8"N 91°43'17.3"W, and is abandoned. United States Geological Survey maps from 1935 show the town to be located on the west bank of the Atchafalaya River at the Southern Pacific Railroad crossing, which was built in 1908. The West Bank location is confirmed by the US Post Office application dated January 21, 1915 and approved February 13, 1915. After the bridge was damaged due to the Great Mississippi Flood of 1927, the railroad from Lafayette to Baton Rouge was abandoned a few years later. With no transportation in and out, the town population began to dwindle, with the last resident leaving in 1959. There is no visible trace of the town left today.

== See also ==
- Butte La Rose - a town in neighboring St. Martin Parish.
- Krotz Springs - a town in neighboring St. Landry Parish.
