= Huey P. Long Bridge =

Huey P. Long Bridge may refer to:

- Huey P. Long Bridge (Baton Rouge), in Baton Rouge, Louisiana, United States
- Huey P. Long Bridge (Jefferson Parish), in Jefferson Parish, Louisiana, United States (near New Orleans), a civil engineering landmark

== See also ==
- Long-Allen Bridge (disambiguation), for other bridges named after Louisiana governors Huey P. Long and Oscar K. Allen
