= 3190 =

3190 may refer to:

- A.D. 3190, a year in the 4th millennium CE
- 3190 BC, a year in the 4th millennium BCE
- 3190, a number in the 3000 (number) range

== Other uses ==
- 3190 Aposhanskij, an asteroid in the Asteroid Belt, the 3190th asteroid registered
- Hawaii Route 3190, a state highway
- Louisiana Highway 3190, a state highway
- Texas Farm to Market Road 3190, a state highway
