= Ridgecrest =

Ridgecrest may refer to:

- Ridgecrest, California
- Ridgecrest, Florida
- Ridgecrest, Louisiana
- Ridgecrest, North Carolina
