= 3180 =

3180 may refer to:

== In general ==
- A.D. 3180, a year in the 4th millennium CE
- 3180 BC, a year in the 4th millennium BCE
- 3180, a number in the 3000 (number) range

== Other uses ==
- 3180 Morgan, an asteroid in the Asteroid Belt, the 3180th asteroid registered
- Hawaii Route 3180, a state highway
- Louisiana Highway 3180, a state highway
- Texas Farm to Market Road 3180, a state highway
