= Long–Allen Bridge =

Long–Allen Bridge can refer to several current or past bridges named in honor of Louisiana governors Huey P. Long and Oscar K. Allen:

- Long–Allen Bridge (Harrisonburg), demolished in 2018
- Long–Allen Bridge (Jonesville), demolished in 2009
- Long–Allen Bridge (Morgan City)
- Long–Allen Bridge (Shreveport), better known as the Texas Street Bridge
