= CNR Bonnet Carré Spillway-Baton Rouge Bridge =

- Coordinates: 30°00′50″N 90°26′11″W
- Carries: Canadian National rail line
- Crosses: Bonnet Carré Spillway
- Locale: St. Charles Parish
- Owner: Canadian National Railway
- Maintained by: Canadian National Railway

Characteristics
- Total length: 6,864 ft (2,092 m)

History
- Opened: 1936

The CNR Bonnet Carré Spillway-Baton Rouge Bridge is a 1.3 mile (2,092 m or 6,864 ft) wooden trestle bridge that carries a Canadian National Railway rail line over the Bonnet Carré Spillway in St. Charles Parish. Its length once had it included on the list for longest bridges in the world.

The bridge is owned and maintained by the Canadian National Railway corporation and is used by Canadian National Railway freight trains. It is currently being reconstructed as a concrete bridge to allow Amtrak to run a train between Baton Rouge and New Orleans.

== See also ==
- List of bridges in the United States
