= E. J. "Lionel" Grizzaffi Bridge =

- Coordinates: 29°41′45″N 91°12′50″W
- Carries: 4 lanes of US 90; Future I-49
- Crosses: Atchafalaya River
- Locale: Berwick and Morgan City, Louisiana
- Maintained by: LaDOTD

Characteristics
- Design: Cantilever bridge
- Total length: 1838.4 ft.
- Width: 67.9 ft.
- Longest span: 617 ft.
- Clearance above: 30 ft.

History
- Opened: 1975

The E. J. "Lionel" Grizzaffi Bridge is a cantilever bridge in the U.S. state of Louisiana which carries US 90 over the Atchafalaya River between Berwick and Morgan City. Before the 1975 opening, US 90 followed the Long–Allen Bridge.

The bridge will eventually be part of the I-49 extension between Lafayette and New Orleans once the highway is brought up to interstate highway standards.
