= Long–Allen Bridge (Jonesville) =

- Coordinates: 31°37′23″N 91°48′43″W
- Carries: 2 lanes of US 84
- Crosses: Black River
- Locale: Jonesville, Louisiana
- Other name: La 8 Bridge
- ID number: 581500220700001

Characteristics
- Design: Swing
- Total length: 673 feet (205 m)
- Width: 21.9 feet (7 m)
- Longest span: 673 feet (205 m)
- Clearance below: 11.8 feet (4 m)

History
- Opened: 1933; 93 years ago
- Closed: 2009; 17 years ago

The Long–Allen Bridge (named for Louisiana Governors Huey Long and Oscar K. Allen) was a two-lane swing bridge carrying U.S. Route 84 (US 84) across the Black River. It connected Jonesville, Louisiana in Catahoula Parish with an unincorporated area of Concordia Parish near Wildsville, Louisiana. It was replaced by a larger bridge in 2009. The newer structure carries 4 lanes of traffic and was built at a cost of $8,610,000.

== See also ==
- Long–Allen Bridge (disambiguation) for other bridges named for the same two governors
