= Long–Allen Bridge (Harrisonburg) =

- Coordinates: 31°46′14″N 91°49′06″W
- Carries: 2 lanes of LA 8
- Crosses: Ouachita River
- Locale: Harrisonburg, LA
- Other name: La 8 Bridge
- Maintained by: LaDOTD
- ID number: 611704500900001

Characteristics
- Design: Truss
- Total length: 4,550 feet (1,387 m) (superstructure); 14,150 feet (4,313 m) (overall)
- Width: 80 feet (24 m)
- Longest span: 1,235 feet (376 m)
- Clearance below: 175 feet (53 m)

History
- Opened: 1933
- Closed: 2017

The Long–Allen Bridge was a truss bridge carrying Highway 8 across the Ouachita River at Harrisonburg in Catahoula Parish, Louisiana. This was the only point where La Route 8 crossed the Ouachita River in Louisiana. It was initially constructed in 1932 and carried approximately 3,000 vehicles per day.

The structure was considered to be in "poor standing" by the Louisiana Department of Transportation and Development. In August 2017, a replacement span, the Veterans Memorial Bridge, was opened. As of November 2017, the bridge was no longer in commission, and in January 2018, it was demolished.

== See also ==
- Long–Allen Bridge (disambiguation) for other bridges named for the same two governors
