= CNR Bonnet Carré Spillway-McComb Bridge =

- Coordinates: 30°03′47″N 90°23′09″W
- Carries: Canadian National Railway
- Crosses: Bonnet Carré Spillway and Lake Pontchartrain
- Locale: St. Charles Parish and St. John the Baptist Parish, Louisiana
- Owner: Canadian National Railway
- Maintained by: Canadian National Railway

Characteristics
- Total length: 12,144 ft (3,701 m)

History
- Opened: 1935

The CNR Bonnet Carré Spillway-McComb Bridge is a 1.3 mile (2,092 m or 6,864 ft) bridge that carries Canadian National Railway tracks over the Bonnet Carré Spillway and a portion of Lake Pontchartrain in St. Charles Parish and St. John the Baptist Parish. Its length makes it one of the longest bridges in the world.

The bridge is owned and maintained by the Canadian National Railway and is used by Amtrak passenger trains and Canadian National Railway freight trains.

In 2011, most likely due to debris hitting the bridge after the opening of the Bonnet Carré Spillway, 26 feet (7.9 m) of the bridge was damaged and a bridge pier was dislodged.

On February 13, 2016, a fire destroyed over 800 feet (240 m) of the trestle near its southeast end. The damaged segment was quickly rebuilt and reopened to rail traffic on February 20.

== See also ==
- List of bridges documented by the Historic American Engineering Record in Louisiana
- List of bridges in the United States
