= Krotz Springs Bridge =

- Coordinates: 30°32′46.0″N 91°44′59.0″W
- Carries: 4 lanes of US 190
- Crosses: Atchafalaya River
- Locale: Krotz Springs, Louisiana and East Krotz Springs, Louisiana
- Official name: Frank and Sal Diesi Bridge
- Maintained by: LaDOTD

Characteristics
- Design: Dual continuous truss bridges

History
- Opened: 1973, 1988

The Krotz Springs Bridge, officially named the Frank and Sal Diesi Bridge, is a pair of continuous truss bridges in the U.S. state of Louisiana which carry US 190 over the Atchafalaya River at Krotz Springs.

Although it was long rumored that the bridge was constructed due to Governor Huey Long's political issues with the town of Melville upstream, which was originally on the route for U.S. Highway 71 and Jefferson Highway, plans for this bridge in Krotz Springs (originally as a toll) were announced as early as 1925. This original span opened July 1, 1928, as a free bridge and carried railroad and automobile traffic, similar to the Atchafalya River Crossing in Simmesport. This dual crossing was short-lived and construction on a dedicated auto bridge began in 1931. Shortly before the dual crossing ended, the railroad commission charged tolls for automobiles.

The original bridge, a truss span costing $1 million, was built in 1934 and carried two lanes of US 190 traffic. It was one of many bridges constructed in the early 1930s named the Long-Allen Bridge. In 1973, a parallel span was built to accommodate westbound traffic as traffic counts overwhelmed the original bridge. In 1985, the original span closed and was demolished, temporarily converting the 1973 span to two-lane traffic. The current eastbound span opened in 1988. In September 2015, the bridge was named for Krotz Springs Port officials Frank and Sal Diesi.

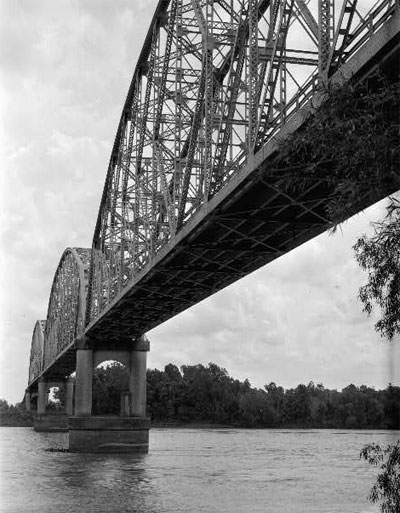
Old Krotz Springs Bridge, replaced by dual span bridges in 1973.

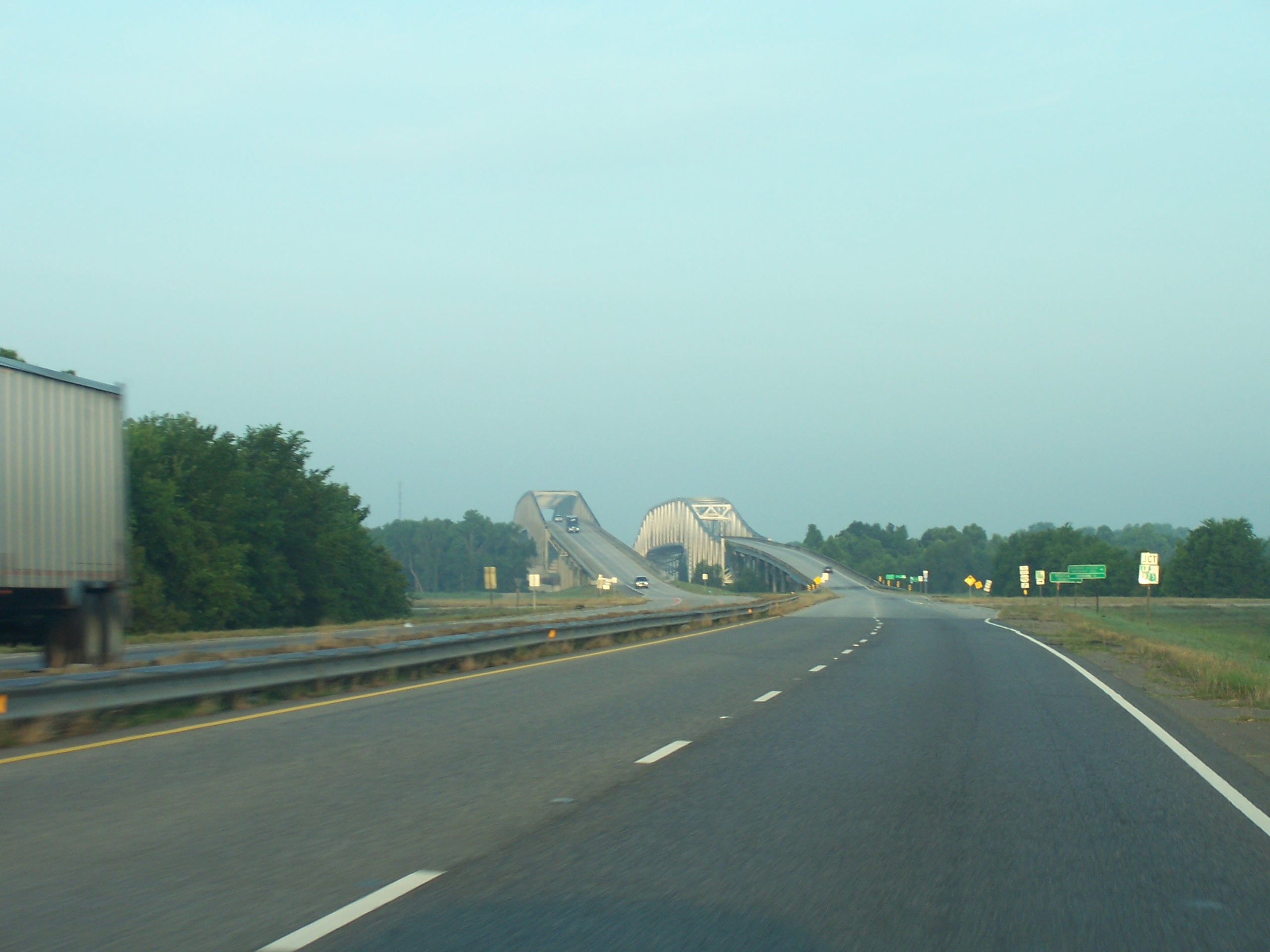
New Krotz Springs bridge span, the one on the right was built in 1973, and the one on the left was built in 1988.

== See also ==
- List of bridges documented by the Historic American Engineering Record in Louisiana
