= U.S. 61 Bonnet Carré Spillway Bridge =

- Coordinates: 30°01′34″N 90°25′16″W
- Carries: 4 lanes of US 61 (Airline Highway)
- Crosses: Bonnet Carré Spillway
- Locale: St. Charles Parish
- Maintained by: LA DOTD

Characteristics
- Total length: 6,006 feet (1,831 m)
- Width: 40 ft

History
- Opened: 1935 (eastern route), 1984 (western route)

Location
- Interactive map of U.S. 61 Bonnet Carré Spillway Bridge

The U.S. 61 Bonnet Carré Spillway Bridge is a twin concrete trestle bridge in the U.S. state of Louisiana. It has a total length of 6,006.0 feet (1,830.6 m; 1.13750 mi). The bridge carries U.S. Route 61 (Airline Highway) over the Bonnet Carré Spillway in St. Charles Parish. The original bridge opened in 1935 serving four narrow lanes of traffic; however, due to frequent traffic congestion and accidents, a parallel span opened in 1984. The original span currently serves eastbound (towards New Orleans) traffic, while the newer span serves westbound (towards Baton Rouge) traffic.

== See also ==
- List of bridges in the United States
