= Long–Allen Bridge (Morgan City) =

Bridge in the United States of America

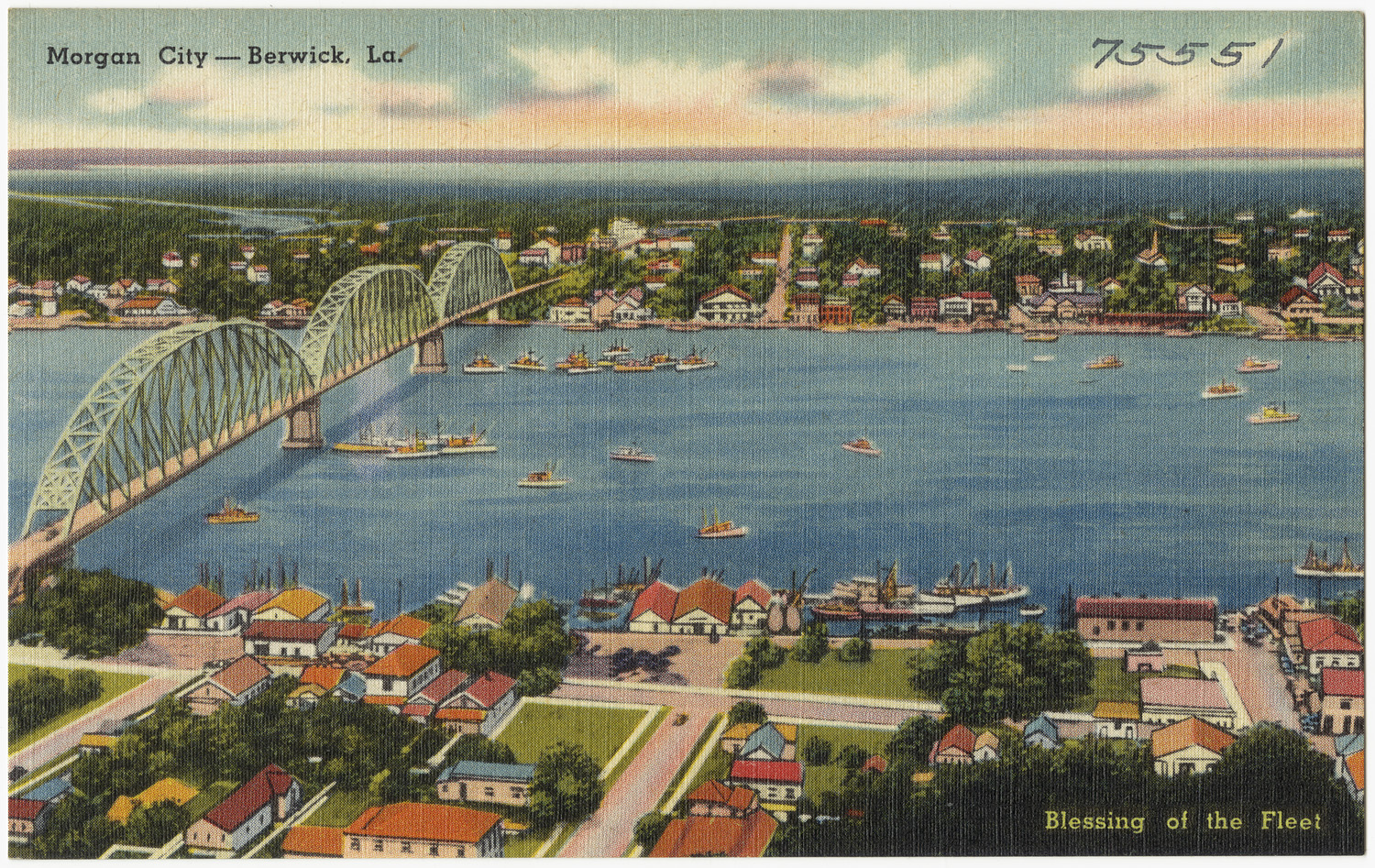
- Coordinates: 29°41′48″N 91°12′51″W
- Carries: 2 lanes of LA 182
- Crosses: Atchafalaya River
- Locale: Berwick and Morgan City, Louisiana
- Maintained by: LaDOTD

Characteristics
- Design: Truss bridge
- Total length: 3,745.2 ft.
- Width: 23.9 ft.
- Longest span: 607.7 ft.
- Clearance above: 14 ft.

History
- Opened: 1933

Location
- Interactive map of Long–Allen Bridge

The Long–Allen Bridge is a truss bridge in the U.S. state of Louisiana which carries LA 182 over the Atchafalaya River between Berwick and Morgan City.

This bridge was built by the Mt. Vernon Bridge Co. of Mt. Vernon, Ohio, and opened for traffic in 1933. This bridge once served as a major crossing along the Old Spanish Trail and US 90 before the E. J. "Lionel" Grizzaffi Bridge opened in 1975.

== Construction ==
The bridge was completed in 1933, with a K-truss design, across the Atchafalaya River. In May 2023, the bridge closed for repairs. It is planned to reopen in May 2025.

== See also ==
- Long–Allen Bridge (disambiguation) for other bridges named for the same two governors
