= Kansas City Southern Bonnet Carré Spillway Bridge =

- Coordinates: 30°01′30″N 90°25′37″W
- Carries: Canadian Pacific Kansas City rail line
- Crosses: Bonnet Carré Spillway
- Locale: St. Charles Parish, Louisiana
- Owner: Canadian Pacific Kansas City
- Maintained by: Canadian Pacific Kansas City

Characteristics
- Total length: 9,501 ft (2,896 m)

History
- Opened: 1936

The Kansas City Southern Bonnet Carré Spillway Bridge is a bridge that carries a Canadian Pacific Kansas City rail line over the Bonnet Carré Spillway in St. Charles Parish. At 1.8 miles (2,896 m or 9,504 ft), its length once had it included on the list for longest bridges in the world.

The bridge is owned and maintained by the Canadian Pacific Kansas City Limited and is used by Canadian Pacific Kansas City (CPKC) freight trains. By 2015, speed limits on the bridge had been reduced to 10 miles per hour (16 km/h). It is proposed to be reconstructed and upgraded as part of Amtrak's proposed New Orleans–Baton Rouge passenger rail.

== See also ==
- List of bridges in the United States
