= New Orleans–Baton Rouge passenger rail =

Proposed train service in Louisiana

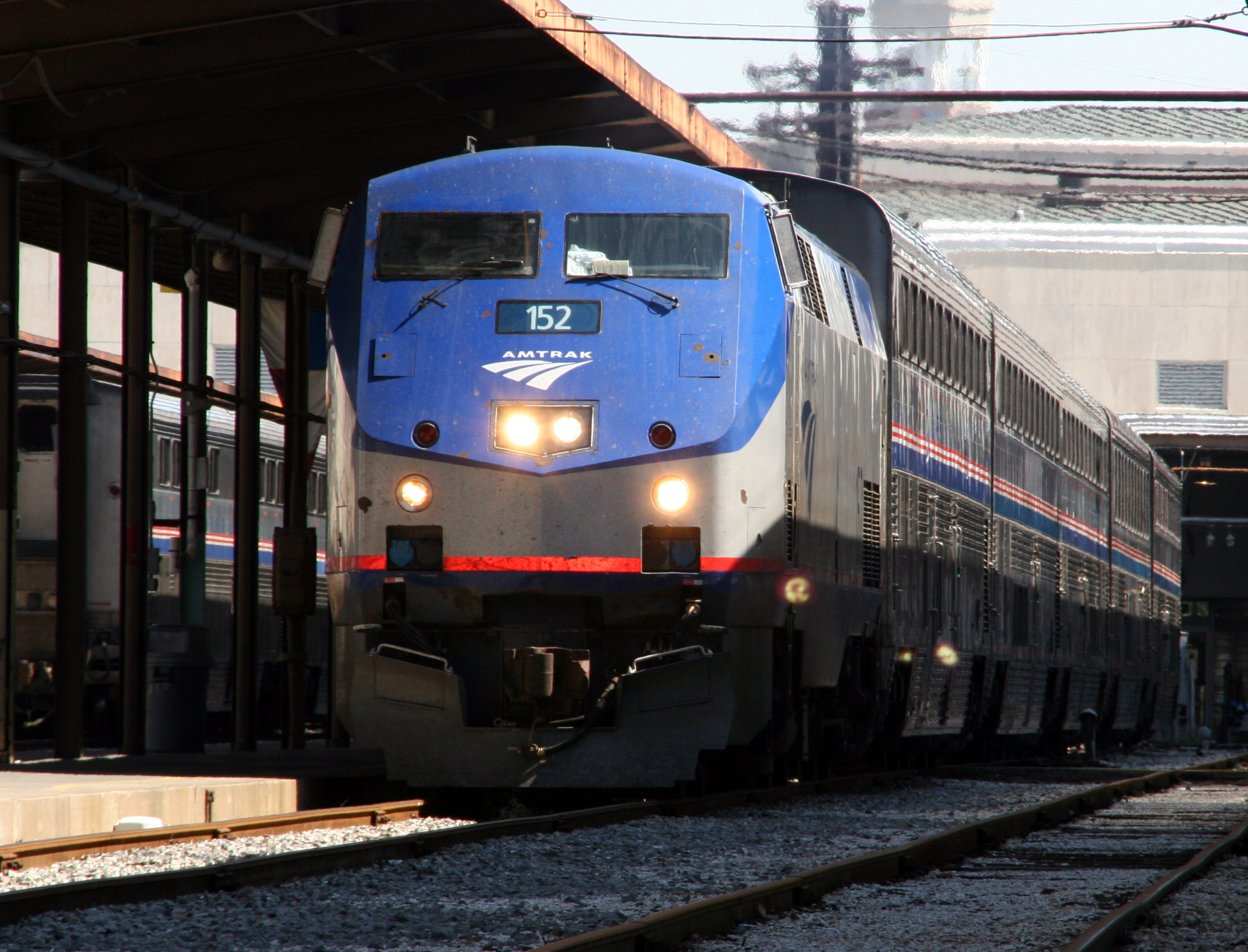
- Amtrak train at New Orleans Union Passenger Terminal, a proposed endpoint of the route

Overview
- Service type: Inter-city rail
- Status: Proposed
- Locale: Louisiana
- First service: 2027 (provisional estimate)
- Website: www.southernrailcommission.org/baton-rouge-to-new-orleans

Route
- Termini: New Orleans; Baton Rouge

Technical
- Track gauge: 4 ft 8 1/2 in (1,435 mm) standard gauge
- Operating speed: 90 mph (140 km/h) (max)

New Orleans–Baton Rouge passenger rail is a proposed inter-city passenger train service between New Orleans and Baton Rouge along the I-10 corridor in the U.S. state of Louisiana. The route would connect the state's largest city to its second-largest city and state capital with trains as fast as 90 mph (140 km/h).

As of August 2023, the project is moving forward but is not fully funded. Initial service is expected to consist of two daily round trips, with intermediate stops that include Louis Armstrong International Airport, LaPlace, and Gonzales. The route is also intended to aid in evacuations ahead of future hurricanes.

== History ==
=== Background ===
The last passenger train to run between New Orleans and Baton Rouge was the Kansas City Southern Railway's Southern Belle, discontinued in 1969. Canadian Pacific Kansas City (formerly just KCS until the 2023 merger with Canadian Pacific Railway) still owns one of the three extant rail lines between New Orleans and Baton Rouge.

In 2009, Louisiana Governor Bobby Jindal rejected $300 million in federal stimulus money from the American Recovery and Reinvestment Act of 2009 that would have gone toward the route.

=== Efforts in the 2020s ===
In spring 2021, Amtrak included the 79-mile (127 km) route in its 15-year "Amtrak Connects US" expansion vision. The proposal calls for two round trips per day with a one-way trip time of 1 hour 34 minutes. Trains would reach speeds up to 90 mph (140 km/h). Intermediate stops are listed as Louis Armstrong New Orleans International Airport, LaPlace, and Gonzales. Economic benefit is estimated at $1.1 billion in one-time investment plus $25.6 million annually.

In December 2021, Canadian Pacific Railway shareholders approved the company's $31 billion takeover of Kansas City Southern. As part of its appeal to regulators, CP committed to supporting one round trip per day between New Orleans and Baton Rouge if the merger were to be approved. The move was supported by Governor John Bel Edwards and New Orleans Mayor LaToya Cantrell.

In April 2022, Governor Edwards promoted the project by riding an inspection train over the proposed route.

In June 2022 the Louisiana Legislature approved $37.5 million toward the project to meet federal dollar-matching obligations. In August the U.S. Department of Transportation awarded a $20 million RAISE grant toward the design and construction of the Baton Rouge and Gonzales train stations. The total cost estimate is $46.6 million for the two stations and $260 million for the total route. Baton Rouge has said it will contribute $3.25 million toward its station.

In November 2022, plans for two daily round trips on the corridor were moving forward. A consultant working on the project said that engineering and financing studies should be completed in February 2023. The preliminary cost of infrastructure upgrades is estimated at $250–300 million, with $80–$100 million going toward rebuilding the Bonnet Carré Spillway Bridge. Louisiana is applying for federal funding authorized by the Infrastructure Investment and Jobs Act. Once funded, construction is expected to take 18 to 24 months.

In August 2023, it was announced that Louisiana had allocated a further $20.5 million in funding to the service, and that the state was hoping to receive $200 million in federal grant money. Service was expected to start as soon as 2025. The grant was ultimately denied in December 2023.

On October 26, 2023, Governor Edwards signed the agreement of the New Orleans–Baton Rouge passenger rail service proposal and the officials announced that the project will begin in 2024 and expect to be completed by 2027.

In December 2023, the Federal Railroad Administration accepted an application by the Louisiana Department of Transportation to enter the New Orleans–Baton Rouge route into its Corridor Identification and Development Program. The program grants $500,000 toward service planning and prioritizes the route for future federal funding.

In January 2024, Republican Jeff Landry succeeded Democrat John Bel Edwards as Governor of Louisiana, a change that was not expected to greatly affect the train project.

== See also ==
- Mardi Gras Service
