= Ridgecrest, Louisiana =

- Town
- Town of Ridgecrest
- Location of Ridgecrest in Concordia Parish, Louisiana.

- Location of Louisiana in the United States
- Coordinates: 31°36′07″N 91°31′50″W
- Country: United States
- State: Louisiana
- Parish: Concordia

Area
  - Total: 0.43 sq mi (1.11 km^{2})
  - Land: 0.43 sq mi (1.11 km^{2})
  - Water: 0 sq mi (0.00 km^{2})
- Elevation: 52 ft (16 m)

Population (2020)
  - Total: 583
  - Density: 1,356.7/sq mi (523.84/km^{2})
- Time zone: UTC-6 (CST)
  - Summer (DST): UTC-5 (CDT)
- Area code: 318
- FIPS code: 22-64765
- GNIS feature ID: 2407213

Ridgecrest is a small town in Concordia Parish, Louisiana, United States. As of the 2020 census, Ridgecrest had a population of 583.

== Geography ==
Ridgecrest is located in northeastern Concordia Parish. U.S. Routes 84 and 425 form the northeast boundary of the town; the highways lead northwest 3 miles (5 km) to Ferriday and southeast 6 miles (10 km) to Vidalia on the Mississippi River; Natchez, Mississippi, is 9 miles (14 km) to the southeast. The Mississippi state line is less than a mile northeast of Ridgecrest in a former channel of the Mississippi River known as Marengo Bend.

According to the United States Census Bureau, the town has a total area of 0.42 square miles (1.1 km^{2}), all land.

== Demographics ==
Historical population
Census	Pop.	Note	%±
1970	1,076		—
1980	895		−16.8%
1990	804		−10.2%
2000	801		−0.4%
2010	694		−13.4%
2020	583		−16.0%
2025 (est.)	539	▼	−7.5%
U.S. Decennial Census

As of the census of 2000, there were 801 people, 291 households, and 229 families residing in the town. The population density was 1,850.2 inhabitants per square mile (714.4/km^{2}). There were 306 housing units at an average density of 706.8 per square mile (272.9/km^{2}). The racial makeup of the town was 93.51% White, 5.49% African American, 0.87% Native American, 0.12% from other races. Hispanic or Latino of any race were 1.37% of the population.

There were 291 households, out of which 28.9% had children under the age of 18 living with them, 60.8% were married couples living together, 12.0% had a female householder with no husband present, and 21.0% were non-families. 17.9% of all households were made up of individuals, and 10.0% had someone living alone who was 65 years of age or older. The average household size was 2.60 and the average family size was 2.95.

In the town, the population was spread out, with 21.5% under the age of 18, 9.9% from 18 to 24, 25.0% from 25 to 44, 25.7% from 45 to 64, and 18.0% who were 65 years of age or older. The median age was 41 years. For every 100 females, there were 95.4 males. For every 100 females age 18 and over, there were 88.9 males.

The median income for a household in the town was $31,000, and the median income for a family was $32,917. Males had a median income of $30,625 versus $20,114 for females. The per capita income for the town was $14,629. About 17.8% of families and 21.7% of the population were below the poverty line, including 33.9% of those under age 18 and 10.0% of those age 65 or over.
