= Long–Allen Bridge (Shreveport) =

Long–Allen Bridge Texas Street Bridge
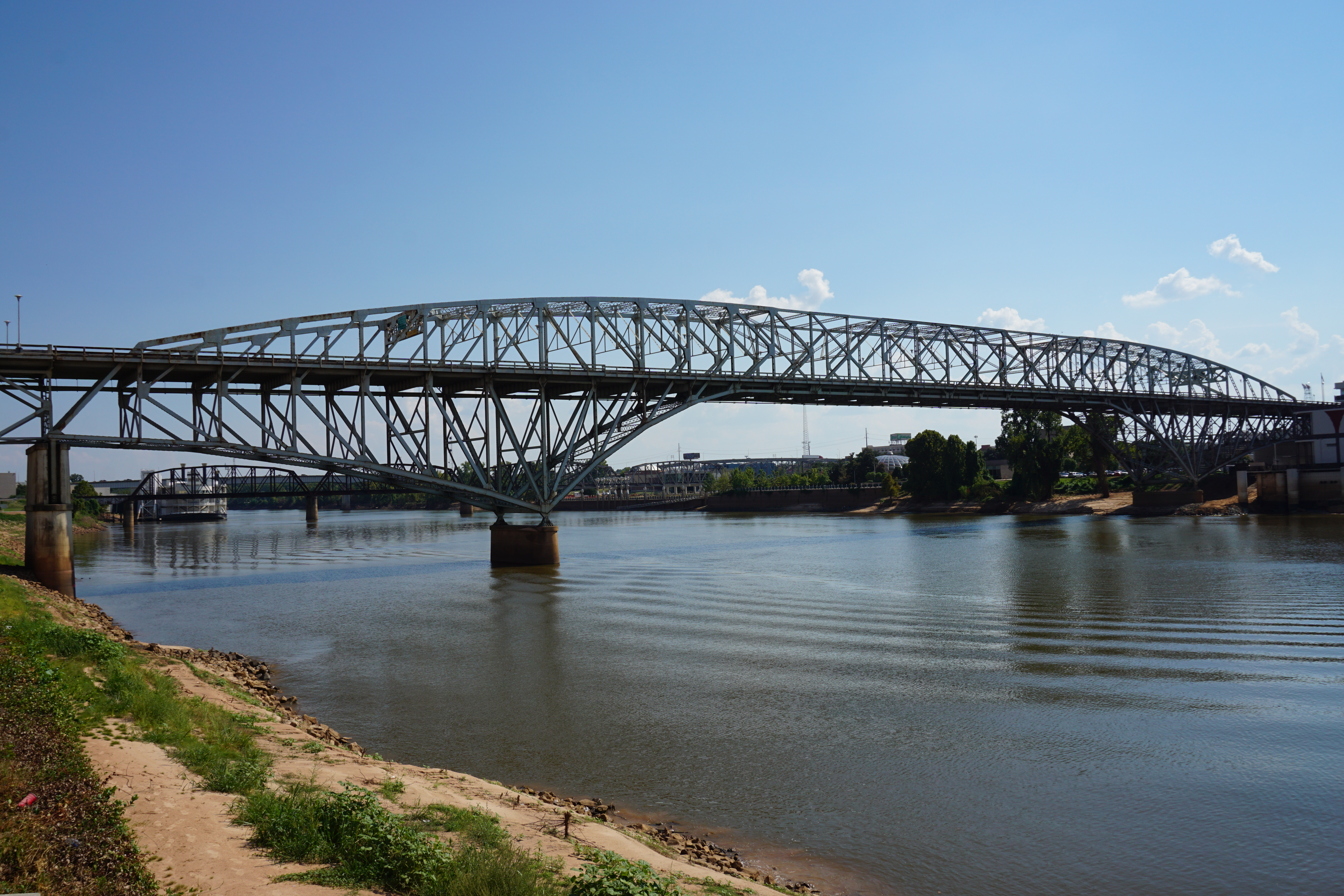
- The Long–Allen Bridge as viewed from Bossier City
- Coordinates: 32.5180°N 93.7425°W
- Carries: US 79 / US 80
- Crosses: Red River

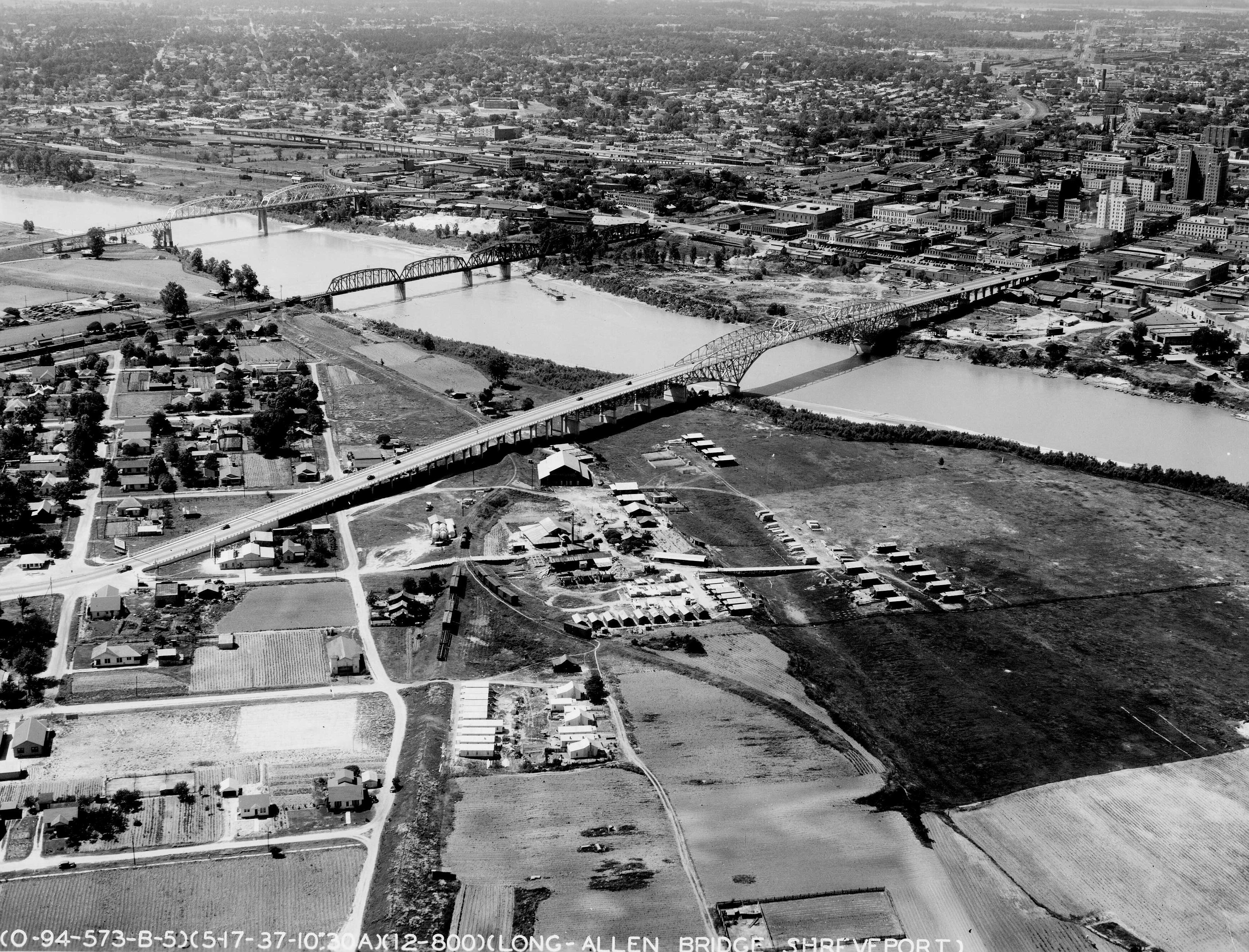
Aerial view of the bridge in 1937

The Long–Allen Bridge is a truss bridge in Louisiana, named for Louisiana governors Huey Long and Oscar K. Allen. It connects Bossier City, Louisiana in Bossier Parish with Shreveport in Caddo Parish. Opened in 1933, it carries US 79/US 80 across the Red River. It is also known as the Texas Street Bridge.

== See also ==
- List of bridges documented by the Historic American Engineering Record in Louisiana
