= Bonnet Carré Crevasse =

Coordinates: 30°0′8″N 90°26′29″W

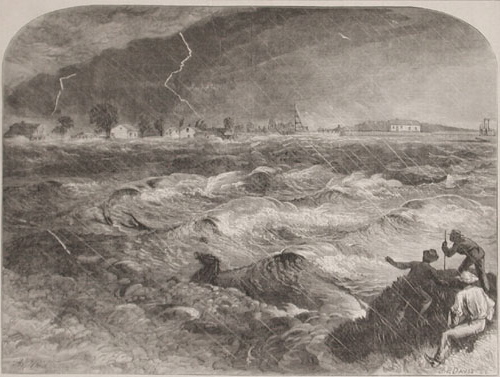
The "Crevasse" or levee breach

The Bonnet Carré Crevasse (1871) was one of several levee breaches in the Bonnet Carré area in the mid-to-late 19th century. Bonnet Carré was approximately 31 miles (50 km) from New Orleans, Louisiana.

The breach occurred when excess water from the Mississippi River flowed over the east bank levee of Bonnet Carré. The original levee was over 12 feet (3.7 m) high, and the Crevasse itself spanned about 1,200 feet (370 m). Local drainage systems were unable to contain the floodwater. The water rushed at 8 miles per hour, causing the width of the breach to increase by the day. Strong northerly winds caused the excess water entering Lake Pontchartrain to flow into populated areas to the east, including neighborhoods Metairie and Gentilly. The increasing force of the flood also caused another nearby levee to break.

Although the devastation to the Bonnet Carré area was great, its ecological impacts were somewhat beneficial. By diverting river water and sediment, the crevasse saved a greater portion of land surrounding the area from succumbing to total flooding and land erosion. Therefore, the crevasse served as a buffer for wetland erosion. Recognizing the benefits, the local government commissioned the construction of an artificial crevasse that could be periodically opened to drain excess water from the Mississippi into Lake Pontchartrain.

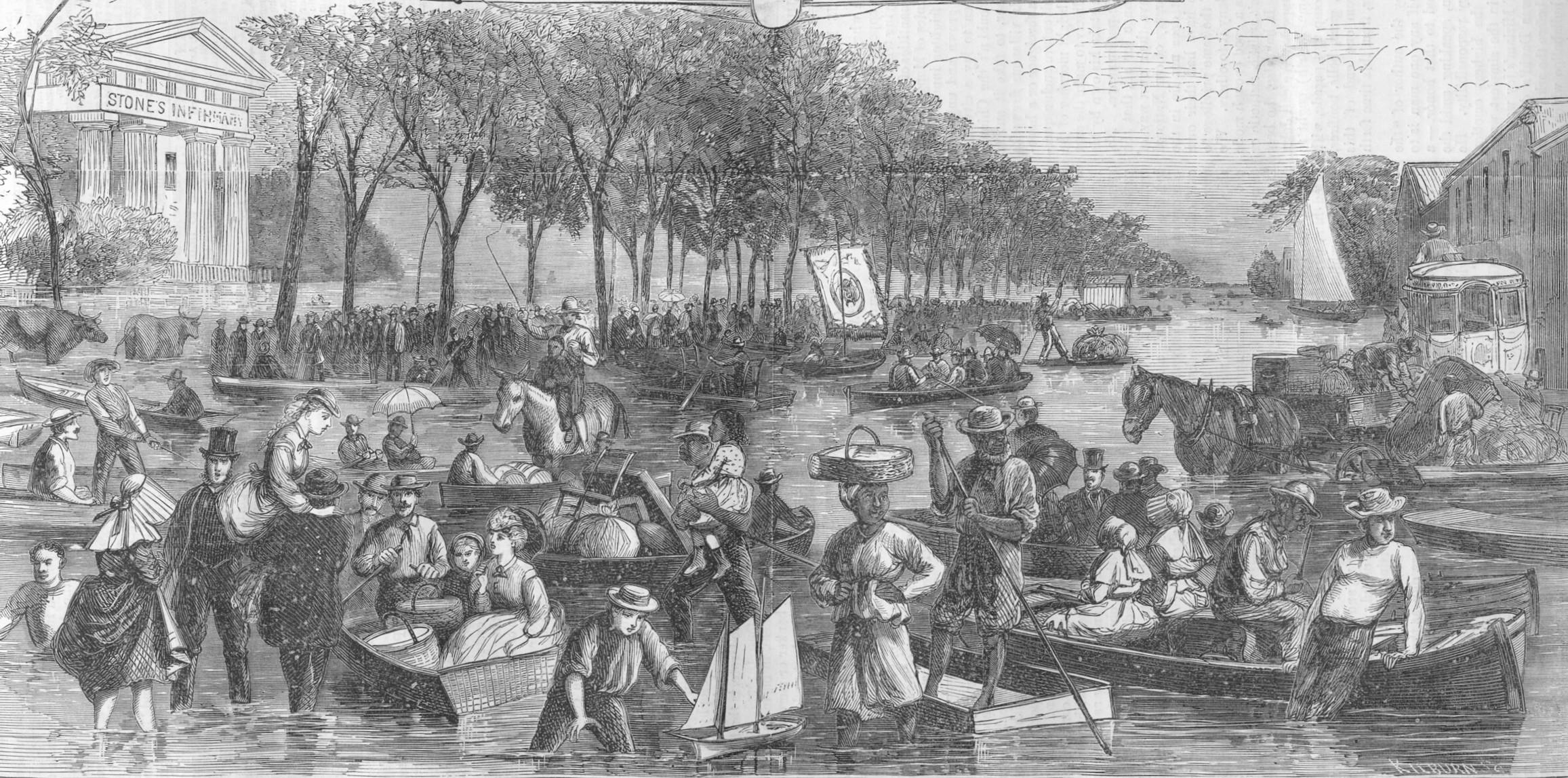
Flooding on Canal Street, New Orleans near Claiborne Avenue

The river levee was not restored at Bonnet Carré until 1883.

The area is now the site of the Bonnet Carré Spillway.
