= Bonnet Carré Spillway =

Flood control operation in the Lower Mississippi Valley, US

Coordinates: 30°0′8″N 90°26′29″W

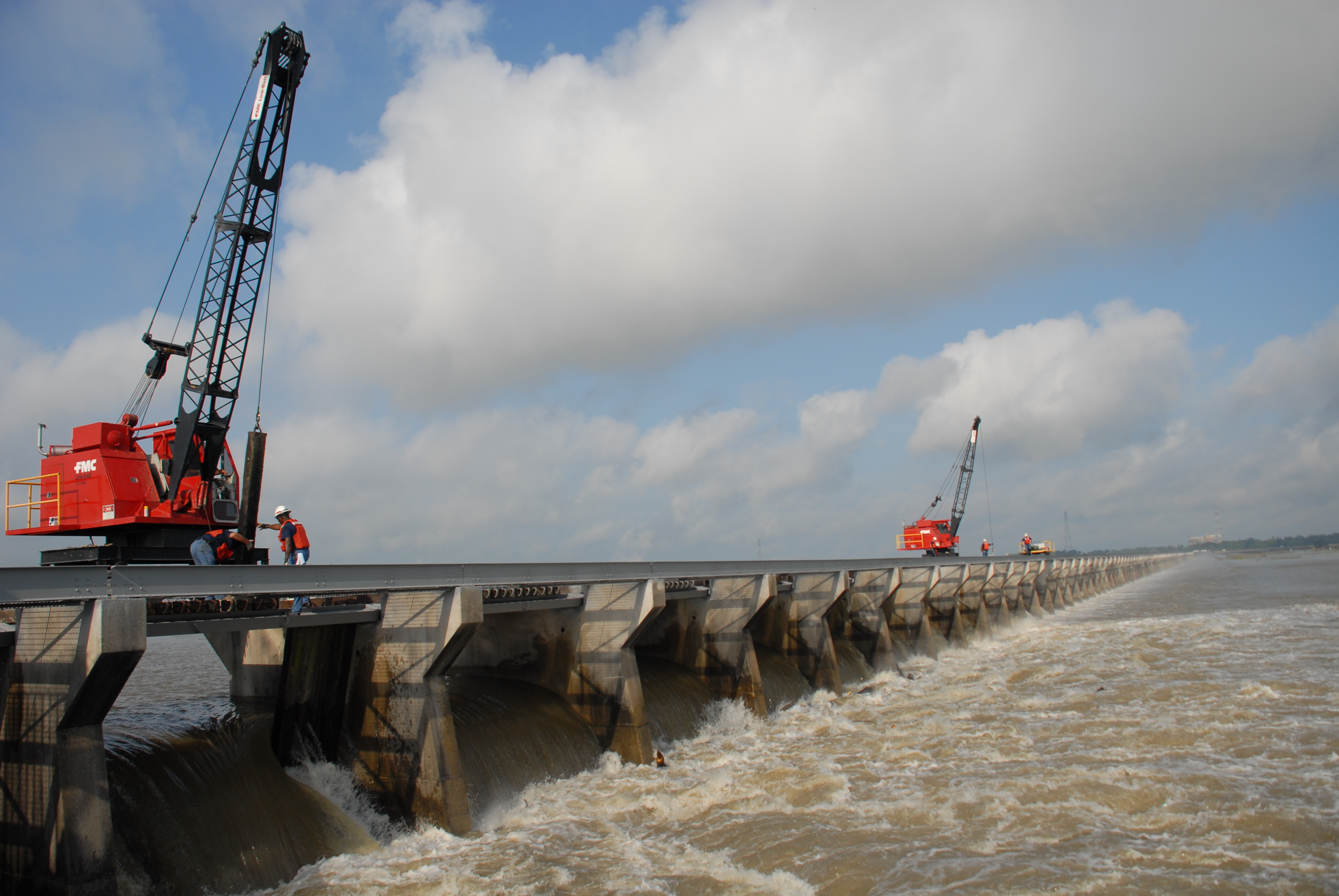
The Bonnet Carré Spillway diverting excess Mississippi River water

The Bonnet Carré Spillway /ˈbɒniː ˈkɛriː/ is a flood control operation in the Lower Mississippi Valley. Located in St. Charles Parish, Louisiana, about 12 miles (19 km) west of New Orleans, it allows floodwaters from the Mississippi River to flow into Lake Pontchartrain and thence into the Gulf of Mexico. The spillway was constructed between 1929 and 1931, following the Great Mississippi Flood of 1927, and has been designated as a National Historic Civil Engineering Landmark by the American Society of Civil Engineers.

== History ==
The Bonnet Carré Crevasse was one of several levee breaches in the Bonnet Carré area in 1871. Local drainage systems were unable to contain the floodwater and strong winds caused the water to enter Lake Pontchartrain and surrounding urban areas. The river levee was not restored until 1883.

The spillway was built in response to the Great Mississippi Flood of 1927 that inundated much of the Mississippi River basin. It was first opened during the flood of 1937.

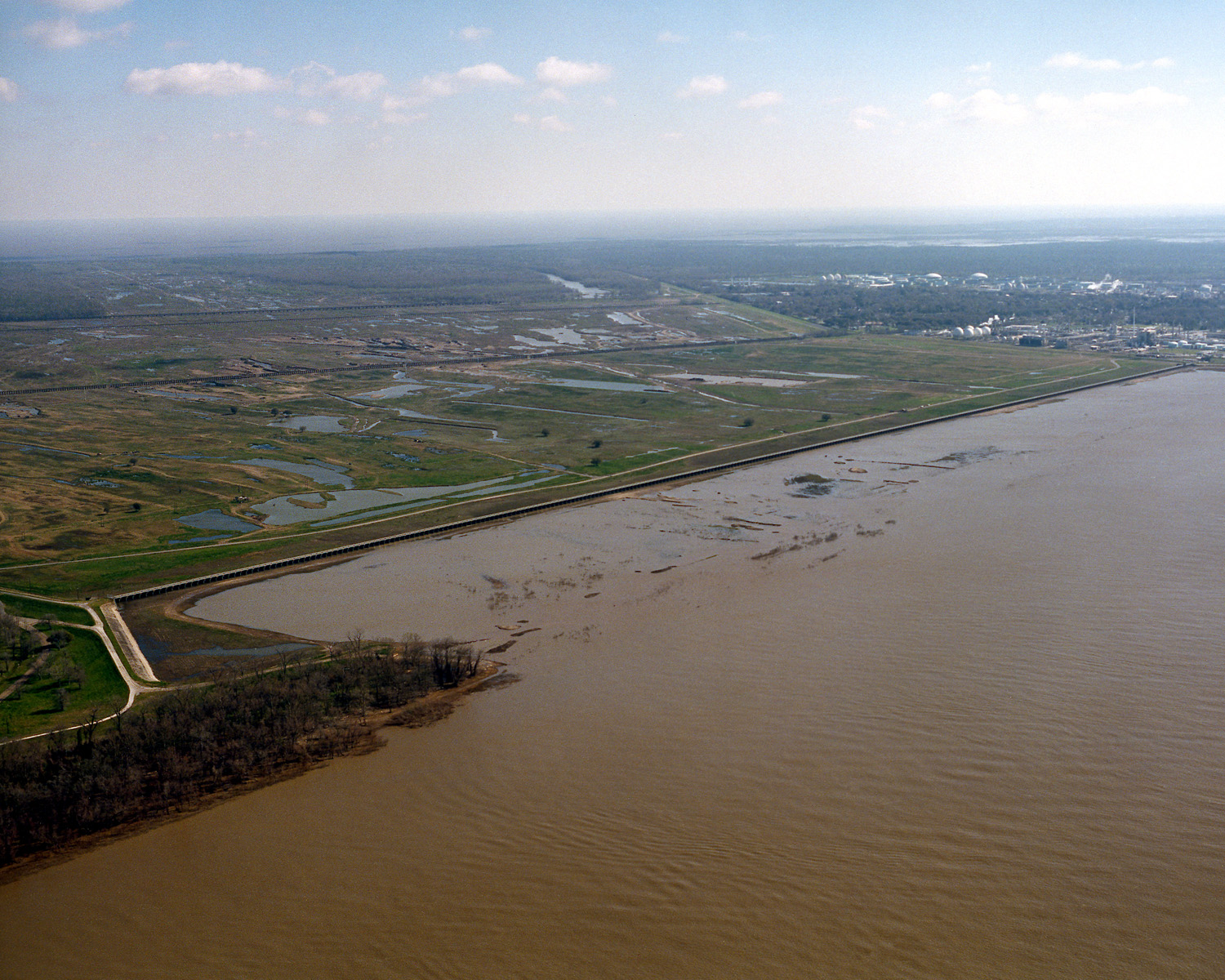
Bonnet Carré Spillway on the Mississippi River viewed to the northeast with Lake Pontchartrain in the distance.

In 2007, extraction operations began on a 42-acre (170,000 m^{2}) square section of spillway property. The 7,600-acre (31 km^{2}) spillway, designed to divert rising water out of the Mississippi River during flooding seasons, long has been a major source of sand and clay that is used in construction projects throughout the area. But in the post-Katrina era, clay extracted from the spillway will be crucial to raising the levees in St. Charles Parish and east Jefferson Parish.

The several openings of the spillway have had a significant effect on marine fisheries in the Mississippi Sound, which resulted in a federal award of damages in 2011 and ongoing federal litigation over the management of the spillway.

The 2019 opening began February 27, 2019, when river levels were predicted to rise to minor flood stage in New Orleans on March 19, 2019. The Army Corps of Engineers initially opened 38 of the 350 bays and increased this number to 206 bays when the flood crest arrived later in March. The Army Corps of Engineers closed the spillway on April 11, 2019, only to reopen it again on May 10, 2019. This marks the first time in the spillway's history that it was opened twice in one year. In April 2020 the Spillway was again opened from April 3, 2020, until May 1, 2020, a total of 29 days.

== Description ==
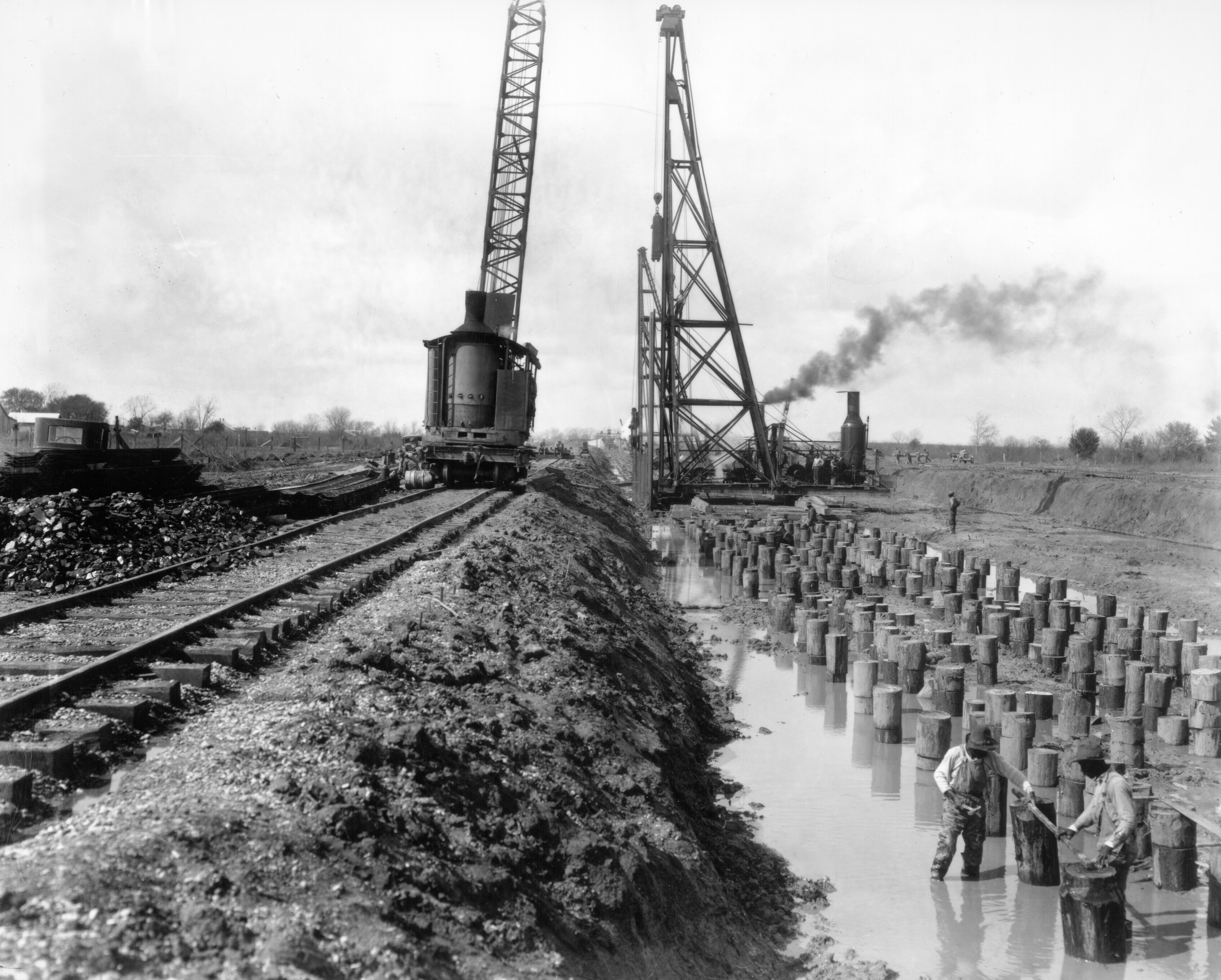
Construction of Bonnet Carré Spillway, Louisiana, 1929.

The Bonnet Carré Spillway consists of two basic components: a control structure along the east bank of the Mississippi River and a floodway that transfers the diverted flood waters to the lake. The control structure, located between the towns of Montz and Norco, is a mechanically controlled concrete weir that extends for over a mile and a half parallel to the river. When opened, the control structure allows overflow volume to flow into Lake Pontchartrain. The lake's opening to the gulf is sufficient to absorb and dissipate any conceivable volume of flood flow. Thus, the flood surcharge portion of the water from the Mississippi is divided between the main river and the diversion channel, with the surcharge bypassing the New Orleans metropolitan area, resulting in the Mississippi being lower (through that area) than it could have been and reducing the stress on the area's levees that line the river. Confined by guide levees, the floodway stretches nearly six miles (9.7 km) to Lake Pontchartrain, with a design capacity of 250,000 cu ft/s (7,100 m^{3}/s). The spillway is crossed by U.S. 61 and Interstate 10.

The spillway's secondary function is as a recreational area. It is used for off-road vehicles, biking, boating, hiking, hunting, and fishing. It is designated a protected wildlife management area by the Louisiana Department of Wildlife and Fisheries. To enhance fishing in the spillway, the clay extraction pits were filled with water and stocked with bluegill, largemouth bass, and other fish.

=== Structure & multi-state plan ===
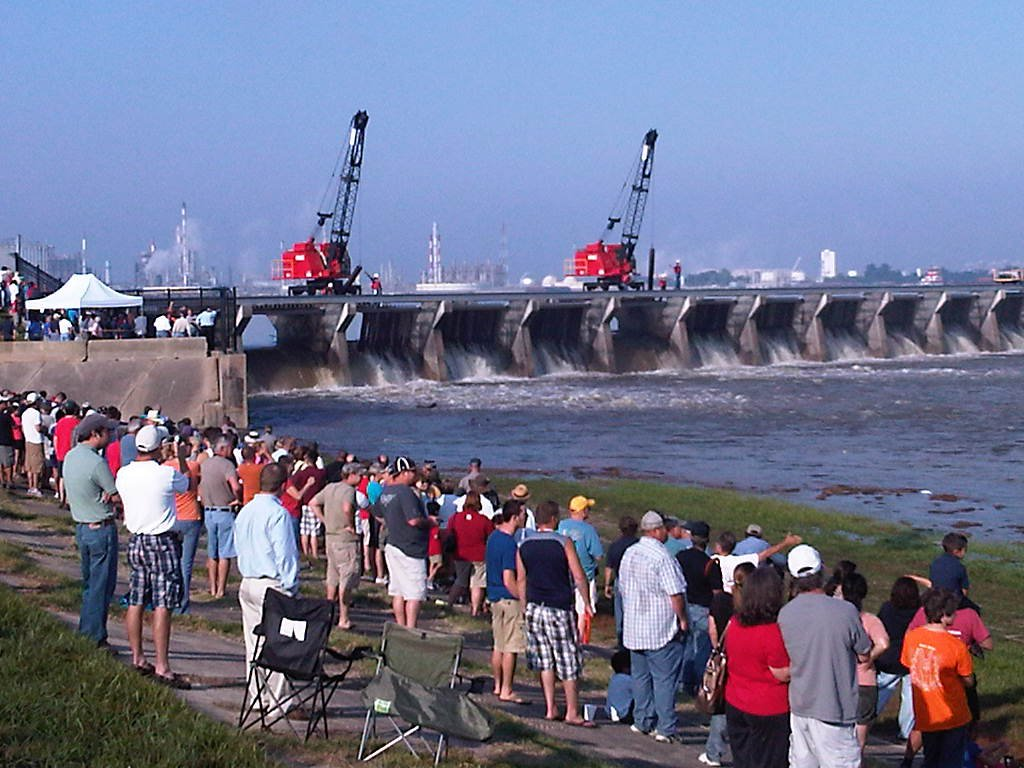
The U.S. Army Corps of Engineers opening the Bonnet Carré Spillway on May 9, 2011

The floodgate inlet is offset into the Mississippi River bank, at a location that had seen natural flooding for at least two centuries. The concrete structure has been designed to reduce settling into the riverbank. The opening and closing of the spillway is done by lifting out up to 7000 wooden 'needles' (8" x 12" wooden beams) arranged in 350 linear bays. This is done by two rail-mounted gantry cranes atop the spillway. The number of needles removed determines the water flow into the spillway. Gaps built into each bay allow limited seepage anytime the river level reaches the bottom of the bays. Removal of all 7000 needles takes about 36 hours but is usually done over a period of several days.

The spillway is part of the United States Army Corps of Engineers' multi-state plan, called the Mississippi River and Tributaries Project (MR&T), providing flood protection for the alluvial valley between Cape Girardeau, Missouri and the mouth of the river near Venice, Louisiana. Because of the wide expanse of the project and the complex problems involved, the plan contains an array of features. The MR&T Project provides for levees to contain flood flows, floodways such as the Bonnet Carré to redirect excess flows away from the Mississippi, and other aspects such as channel improvement and river bank stabilization, for efficient navigation and protection of the levee system. It also involves reservoirs and pumping stations for flood control drainage.

== List of openings ==
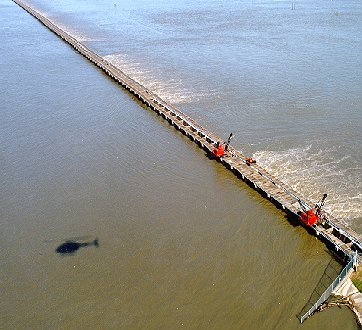
Opening of the Bonnet Carré Spillway in March 1997.

The following chart shows the years when the spillway was opened, number of days it remained open, peak number of bays opened, percent of maximum flow at peak, and peak flow rate. The spillway has a design capacity of 250,000 cu ft/s (7,100 m^{3}/s) when all 350 bays are fully open, or approximately 714 cu ft/s (20.2 m^{3}/s) per bay.

Year	Date Opened	Days Open	Bays Opened At Peak	Percentage of Max Flow	Peak Flow Rate
1937	January 28	48	285	81.4%	203,571 cu ft/s (5,764.5 m^{3}/s)
1945	March 23	57	350	100%	250,000 cu ft/s (7,100 m^{3}/s)
1950	February 10	38	350	100%	250,000 cu ft/s (7,100 m^{3}/s)
1973	April 8	75	350	100%	250,000 cu ft/s (7,100 m^{3}/s)
1975	April 14	13	225	64.3%	160,714 cu ft/s (4,550.9 m^{3}/s)
1979	April 17	45	350	100%	250,000 cu ft/s (7,100 m^{3}/s)
1983	May 20	35	350	100%	250,000 cu ft/s (7,100 m^{3}/s)
1997	March 17	31	298	85.1%	212,857 cu ft/s (6,027.4 m^{3}/s)
2008	April 11	31	160	45.7%	114,286 cu ft/s (3,236.2 m^{3}/s)
2011	May 9	42	330	94.3%	235,714 cu ft/s (6,674.7 m^{3}/s)
2016	January 10	22	210	81.2%	203,000 cu ft/s (5,700 m^{3}/s)
2018	March 8	22	183	78.4%	196,000 cu ft/s (5,600 m^{3}/s)
2019	February 27	43	206	85.2%	213,000 cu ft/s (6,000 m^{3}/s)
2019	May 10	79	168	64.4%	161,000 cu ft/s (4,600 m^{3}/s)
2020	April 3	29	90	36.0%	90,000 cu ft/s (2,500 m^{3}/s)

There was an additional test opening of a single bay on April 21, 2025, when weather forecasts showed that the Mississippi River might rise to the threshold requiring a partial opening. The bay was opened briefly with a flow rate of 260 cu ft/s (7.4 m^{3}/s).

== Kugler and Kenner Cemeteries ==
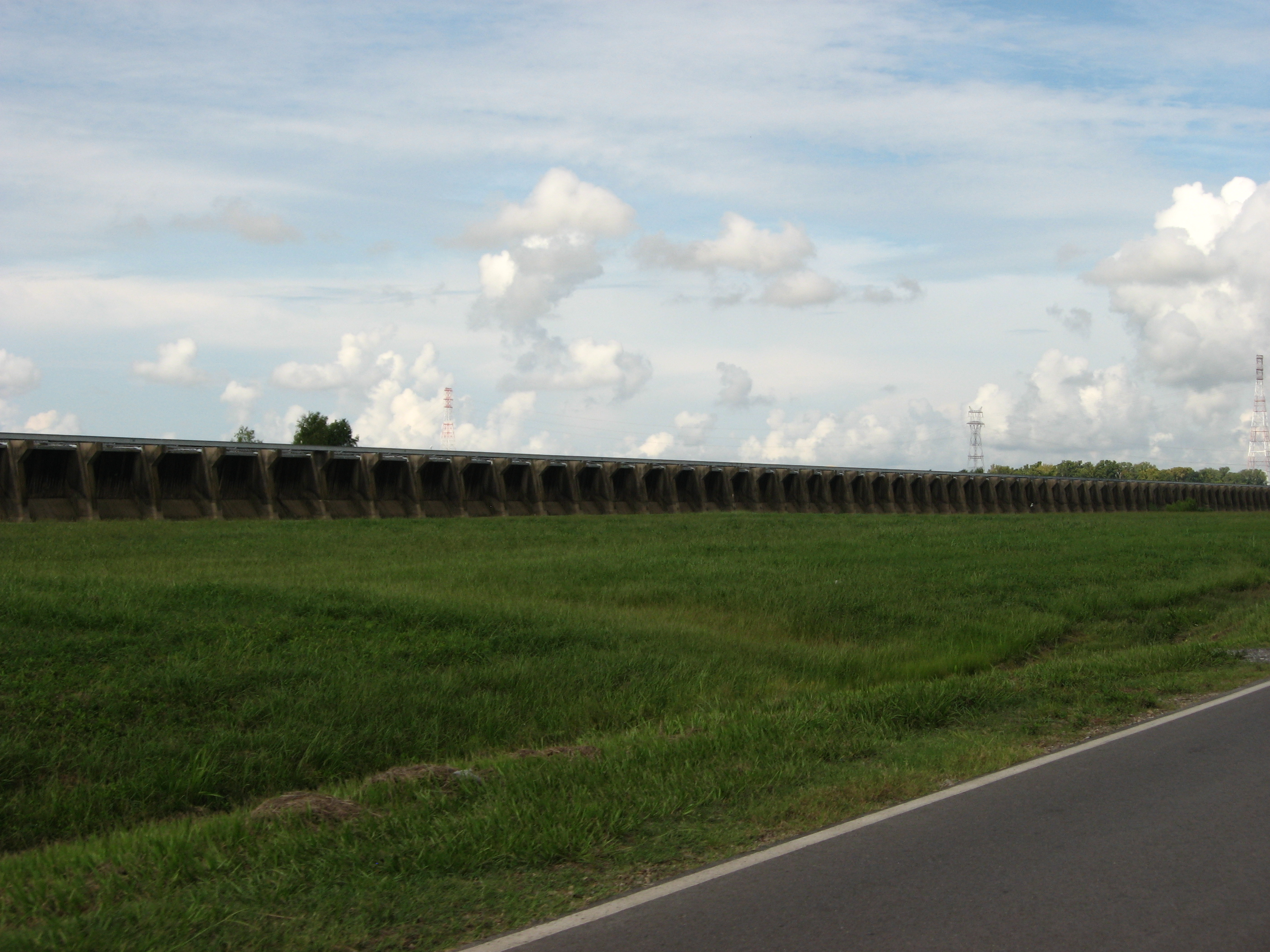
View of the Bonnet Carré Spillway from road that is closed and under water when the floodgates are opened.

There are two cemeteries located in the spillway. The cemeteries contain the remains of enslaved persons of African descent and free African-Americans, and the historic ground surface is under several feet of sediment. When the spillway gates are opened, the cemeteries are flooded.

The location of the gravesites was a mystery until May 1975, when the US Army Corps of Engineers excavated a ditch in the spillway. During that process, a tombstone and casket were discovered. In 1986, the corps ordered a historical study of the spillway and discovered a second cemetery. The two cemeteries were placed on the National Register of Historic Places in 1987. The artifacts discovered during the 1986 study included coffin furniture, coffins, grave markers, cultural remains, and human remains. The Kenner and Kugler Cemeteries Archeological District consists of the two cemeteries. Additional research on the cemeteries was done in 2002–2005 and archaeological investigations in 2008–2009.

The cemeteries, named the Kenner Cemetery and the Kugler Cemetery, are black burial plots which appear to date from the early 1800s and were in use until 1929. Several African-American US Army Civil War veterans were moved from the spillway cemeteries to Chalmette National Cemetery in 1930. The total number of burials in either cemetery is unknown. The sites adjoin 19th- and early 20th-century sugar plantations in St. Charles Parish. According to oral histories and as confirmed by GIS analysis, both cemeteries were located in the midst of the cane fields of their respective plantations. The Kenner Cemetery, located on the former Roseland Plantation, was reported to be marked by iron and wooden crosses during its period of use. No such markers were confirmed archaeologically, but one granite US veteran headstone was recovered from the site. The Kugler Cemetery, located on the former Hermitage Plantation, was reported to contain iron crosses and a metal fence. One such iron cross and remnants of what could have been the fence were recovered during the 1986 archaeological investigations. At present, the cemetery sites have been demarcated by young live oak trees.

== Diversion projects ==
The success of the Caernarvon Freshwater and the Davis Pond Freshwater Diversions, especially concerning wetlands maintenance more than wetlands building, has led to studies for more fresh water diversion projects. Caernarvon and Davis Pond diversions have limits, because of laws governing their operation, aimed at limiting the flow of freshwater to minimize damage to oysters. The Bonnet Carré Spillway diversion would be built within the spillway, on the east bank of the Mississippi, allowing up to 25,000 cu ft/s (710 m^{3}/s) of fresh water and sediment diversion into Lake Pontchartrain and the Mississippi Sound. The diversion would slow or stop subsidence, reducing marsh loss by 10,500 acres in the next 50 years, providing fish and wildlife protection, as well as further storm surge protection. The diversion was authorized by the Water Resources Development Act of 1988 (WRDA 1988), and Congress (1990) split the cost and maintenance between the Federal Government at 75%, Louisiana at 20% and Mississippi at 5%. Louisiana and Mississippi must agree to a final project design, but in July 1996, Louisiana withdrew as a sponsor, and as of 2016 an agreement has not been reached.

== See also ==
- CNR Bonnet Carré Spillway-Baton Rouge Bridge
- CNR Bonnet Carré Spillway-McComb Bridge
- Kansas City Southern Bonnet Carré Spillway Bridge
- I-10 Bonnet Carré Spillway Bridge
- U.S. 61 Bonnet Carré Spillway Bridge
- Birds Point-New Madrid Floodway
- Morganza Spillway
- 2011 Mississippi River floods
