= Butte La Rose, Louisiana =

Butte La Rose
- Location of Butte La Rose in Louisiana
- Coordinates: 30°16′40″N 91°41′12″W
- Country: United States
- State: Louisiana
- Parish: St. Martin
- Time zone: UTC-6 (CST)
  - Summer (DST): UTC-5 (CDT)

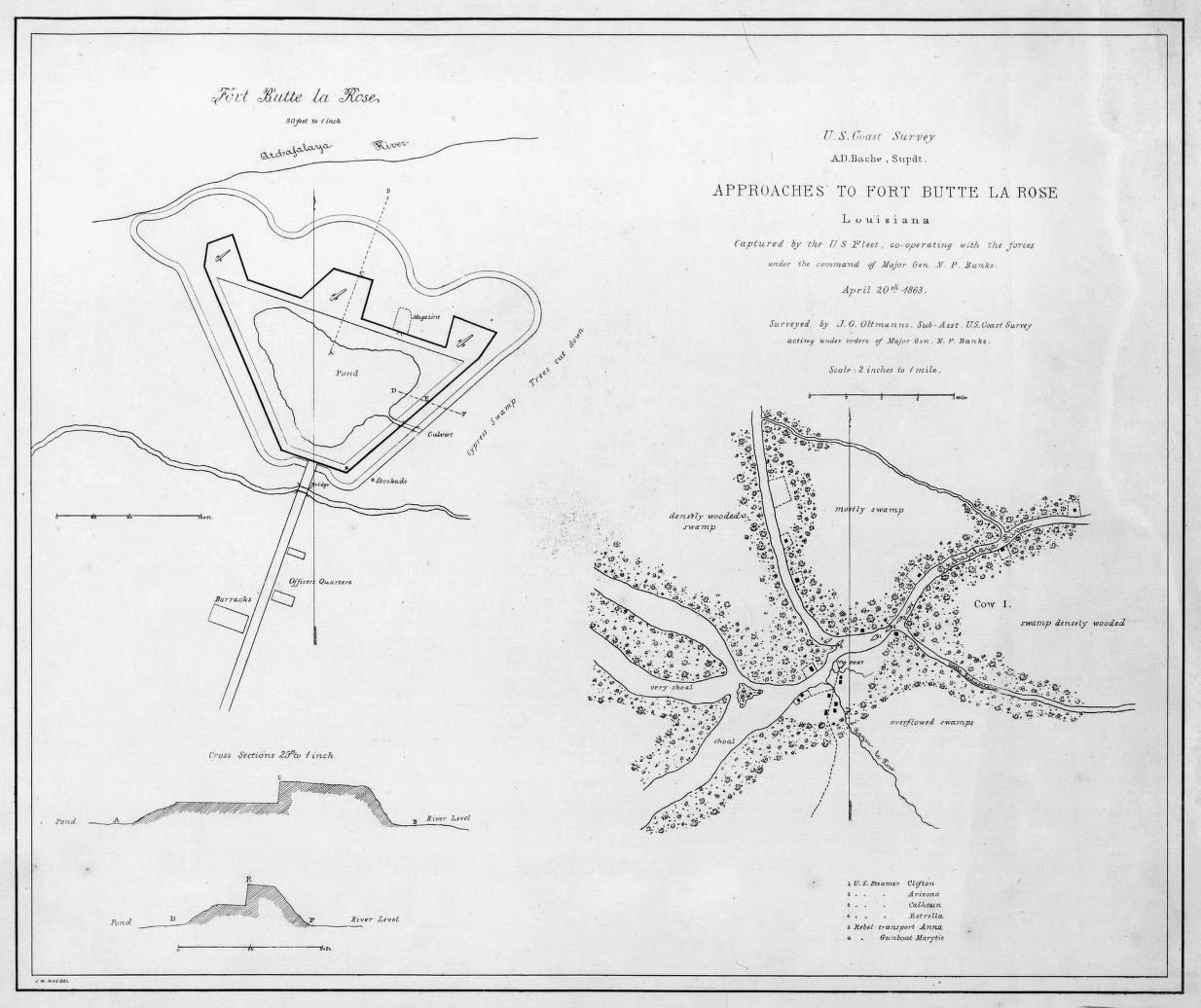
Fort Butte La Rose, Louisiana in 1863

Butte La Rose (also known as Butte-à-la-Rose) is an unincorporated community in St. Martin Parish, Louisiana, United States. In the 21st century, the area is known for its wilderness campgrounds, and the Atchafalaya Welcome Center.

In 2011, Ed Lavandera of CNN said that Butte La Rose was "home to an eclectic collection of Cajuns who've come to this hideaway for generations to drift through the hidden waters catching crawfish." As of 2011 about 800 houses were located in the community. A number of members of the community referred to their houses as "camps".

== History ==
=== Early history ===
The community is located on a high point where the Atchafalaya River makes a sharp bend and divides into the Little Atchafalaya River to the south and the Upper Grand River to the north.

Some claim an old Indian, Celestin Rose, who resided at one time in Grand Bois said that the butte was named after one of his ancestors, "a famous Chitimacha Indian". Another version is that following the French Revolution, some royalists made the butte their home and named it Rose in memory of the flower which was the symbol of their fallen society.

=== U.S. Civil War ===
During the U.S. Civil War, the Union Army capture of Fort Burton at Butte a la Rose took place on April 20, 1863.

=== 2011 flooding ===
In May 2011, the area was threatened by flood due to the Army Corps of Engineers opening the Morganza Spillway, in order to divert flood water from more populous areas such as Baton Rouge and New Orleans.

== Education ==
Residents are zoned to the St. Martin Parish School Board.

== See also ==
- USS Clifton (1862)
- USS Arizona (1858)
