= Krotz Springs, Louisiana =

- Town
- Town of Krotz Springs
- Location of Krotz Springs in St. Landry Parish, Louisiana.

- Location of Louisiana in the United States
- Coordinates: 30°31′45″N 91°44′50″W
- Country: United States
- State: Louisiana
- Parish: St. Landry

Area
  - Total: 1.73 sq mi (4.49 km^{2})
  - Land: 1.73 sq mi (4.47 km^{2})
  - Water: 0.0039 sq mi (0.01 km^{2})
- Elevation: 23 ft (7.0 m)

Population (2020)
  - Total: 904
  - Density: 523.2/sq mi (202.02/km^{2})
- Time zone: UTC-6 (CST)
  - Summer (DST): UTC-5 (CDT)
- ZIP Code: 70750
- Area code: 337
- FIPS code: 22-40280
- GNIS feature ID: 2405960
- Website: krotzsprings.org

Krotz Springs is a town in St. Landry Parish, Louisiana, United States, on the Atchafalaya River. As of the 2020 census, Krotz Springs had a population of 904. It is part of the Opelousas–Eunice Micropolitan Statistical Area.

== History ==
Around the turn of the 20th century, an Ohio native, Charles William Krotz, bought 20,000 acres (81 km^{2}) of woodland around the Atchafalaya Basin and set up a sawmill to trim the trees hauled out of the basin. The tiny settlement that grew up around the mill was called Latania (fan palm), after the bayou of the same name and the types of palm plants found in the area.

Thinking he was sitting on an untapped pool of oil, Krotz attempted to drill the first oil well in St. Landry Parish in 1900, but he struck water instead of oil, the result becoming known as Krotz's spring. The spring was used to supply water for the developing sawmill town, and Krotz even bottled the water, selling it throughout the country.

In 1909, a post office was established in the town, and the obvious choice of a name was Krotz Springs.

The Krotz Springs Bridge spanning the Atchafalaya River opened in 1928 and carried railroad and automobile traffic. It was superseded by other bridges at the same location in 1934, 1973, and 1988.

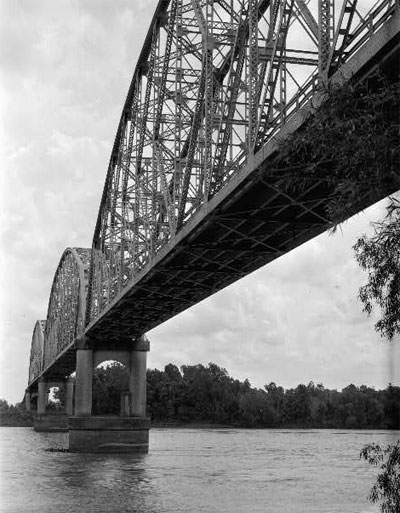
Krotz Springs Bridge spanning the Atchafalaya River.

== Mayors ==
Robert A. Moran, a Democrat served as mayor from 1986 until his death in May 1987. On November 21, 1987, James Rasie Nall defeated Ina Moran (D) in a runoff election for mayor. Four years later, on October 6, 1990, Gary Soileau (D) defeated Larry Martinez Sr. (D), in a landslide victory with 86 percent of the ballots cast. Soileau would remain mayor until he retired in 2010, when he was succeeded by Carroll Snyder, another Krotz Springs Democrat.

List of most Krotz Springs Mayors since 1917:

Charles W. Krotz	1917 - 1925
Lester Lemoine	1926 - ?
James Edward Helton	1930 - 1932
Ralph DelBuono	1932 - ?
Eddie Eusay	1944 - 1950
Clinton C Artigue	1950 - 1954
Eddie Eusay	1955 - 1956
Robert Humphreys	1956 - 1958
James Rasie Nall	1958 - 1986
Robert A Moran	1986 - 1987
James Rasie Nall	1987 - 1989
Gary Soileau	1989 - 2010
Carroll Snyder	2010 – Present

== Geography ==
On the eastern border of Krotz Springs is Pointe Coupee Parish over the Atchafalaya River via U.S. Highway 190 while Opelousas, the St. Landry Parish seat, is located 20 miles (32 km) west of Krotz Springs. The city of Baton Rouge is located 40 miles (64 km) to the east.

According to the United States Census Bureau, the town has a total area of 1.7 square miles (4.4 km^{2}), all land.

== Demographics ==
Historical population
Census	Pop.	Note	%±
1920	247		—
1930	449		81.8%
1940	630		40.3%
1950	866		37.5%
1960	1,057		22.1%
1970	1,435		35.8%
1980	1,374		−4.3%
1990	1,285		−6.5%
2000	1,219		−5.1%
2010	1,198		−1.7%
2020	904		−24.5%
2025 (est.)	877	▼	−3.0%
U.S. Decennial Census

=== 2020 census ===
Krotz Springs racial composition
Race	Number	Percentage
White (non-Hispanic)	827	91.48%
Black or African American (non-Hispanic)	7	0.77%
Native American	5	0.55%
Asian	1	0.11%
Other/Mixed	37	4.09%
Hispanic or Latino	27	2.99%

As of the 2020 United States census, there were 904 people, 373 households, and 242 families residing in the town.

=== 2010 census ===
As of the 2010 United States census, there were 1,198 people living in the town. The racial makeup of the town was 97.2% White, 0.2% Black, 0.3% Native American, 0.4% Asian and 0.3% from two or more races. 1.5% were Hispanic or Latino of any race.

=== 2000 census ===
As of the census of 2000, there were 1,219 people, 490 households, and 339 families living in the town. The population density was 705.0 inhabitants per square mile (272.2/km^{2}). There were 562 housing units at an average density of 325.0 per square mile (125.5/km^{2}). The racial makeup of the town was 99.10% White, 0.25% African American, 0.08% Native American, 0.08% from other races, and 0.49% from two or more races. Hispanic or Latino of any race were 0.74% of the population.

There were 490 households, out of which 34.9% had children under the age of 18 living with them, 52.4% were married couples living together, 11.8% had a female householder with no husband present, and 30.8% were non-families. 26.9% of all households were made up of individuals, and 12.9% had someone living alone who was 65 years of age or older. The average household size was 2.49 and the average family size was 2.99.

In the town, the population was spread out, with 26.9% under the age of 18, 11.4% from 18 to 24, 28.0% from 25 to 44, 20.2% from 45 to 64, and 13.5% who were 65 years of age or older. The median age was 33 years. For every 100 females, there were 95.4 males. For every 100 females age 18 and over, there were 87.2 males.

The median income for a household in the town was $26,823, and the median income for a family was $31,842. Males had a median income of $29,167 versus $21,875 for females. The per capita income for the town was $13,914. About 17.5% of families and 22.5% of the population were below the poverty line, including 25.6% of those under age 18 and 18.3% of those age 65 or over.

As of 2010, 77.39% of the population identified themselves as belonging to a faith community; of these 86.5% were Catholic, 9.4% were Southern Baptist and 2.4% were Churches of Christ.

According to the American Community Survey of 2010–2014, 82.2% of residents identify as having either French or French Canadian ancestry.

== Film history ==
- 1966: The prison camp scenes in Nevada Smith, starring Steve McQueen, were filmed just west of Krotz Springs in the 2 O'Clock Bayou area.
- 1969: The final scene of Easy Rider, starring Peter Fonda and Dennis Hopper, was filmed a few miles north of there, in which the two main characters are shot by two local residents, David C. Billodeau and Johnny David, on Louisiana Highway 105.
- 1998: In the film Out of Sight, starring George Clooney and Jennifer Lopez, two of the main characters lose control of their vehicle coming down the Atchafalaya River Bridge on U.S. Route 190 Westbound.
