= Glencoe, Louisiana =

- Census-designated place
- Location of Glencoe in Louisiana
- Coordinates: 29°48′20″N 91°40′04″W
- Country: United States
- State: Louisiana
- Parish: St. Mary

Area
  - Total: 0.66 sq mi (1.71 km^{2})
  - Land: 0.66 sq mi (1.71 km^{2})
  - Water: 0 sq mi (0.00 km^{2})
- Elevation: 9 ft (2.7 m)

Population (2020)
  - Total: 132
  - Density: 199.5/sq mi (77.03/km^{2})
- Time zone: UTC-6 (CST)
  - Summer (DST): UTC-5 (CDT)
- Area code: 337
- FIPS code: 22-29150

Glencoe is a census-designated place (CDP) in St. Mary Parish, Louisiana, United States. As of the 2020 census, Glencoe had a population of 132. It is part of the Morgan City Micropolitan Statistical Area.

== Geography ==
Glencoe is located at 29°48′20″N 91°40′4″W (29.80576, -91.66789).

Louisiana Highway 83 passes throughout the entire community and heads 9 miles (14 km) east to the town of Baldwin. Louisiana Highway 318, which intersects with LA-83, heads 7 miles (11 km) northeast to intersect with Louisiana Highway 182 at the unincorporated community of Sorrel.

According to the United States Census Bureau, the CDP has a total area of 0.66 square miles (1.7 km^{2}), all land.

== Demographics ==
Historical population
Census	Pop.	Note	%±
2010	211		—
2020	132		−37.4%
U.S. Decennial Census

Glencoe first appeared as a census designated place in the 2010 U.S. census.

Glencoe CDP, Louisiana – Racial and ethnic composition Note: the US Census treats Hispanic/Latino as an ethnic category. This table excludes Latinos from the racial categories and assigns them to a separate category. Hispanics/Latinos may be of any race.
Race / Ethnicity (NH = Non-Hispanic)	Pop 2010	Pop 2020	% 2010	% 2020
White alone (NH)	26	14	12.32%	10.61%
Black or African American alone (NH)	163	112	77.25%	84.85%
Native American or Alaska Native alone (NH)	0	0	0.00%	0.00%
Asian alone (NH)	4	0	1.90%	0.00%
Native Hawaiian or Pacific Islander alone (NH)	0	0	0.00%	0.00%
Other race alone (NH)	6	0	2.84%	0.00%
Mixed race or Multiracial (NH)	8	1	3.79%	0.76%
Hispanic or Latino (any race)	4	5	1.90%	3.79%
Total	211	132	100.00%	100.00%
