= Louisiana Highway 83 =

Highway in Louisiana

Louisiana Highway 83

- Route of LA 83 highlighted in red

Route information
- Maintained by Louisiana DOTD
- Length: 34.013 mi (54.739 km)
- Existed: 1955 renumbering–present

Major junctions
- West end: LA 14 in New Iberia
- Future I-49 / US 90 south of New Iberia; LA 85 in Lydia; Future I-49 / US 90 in Baldwin
- East end: LA 182 in Baldwin

Location
- Country: United States
- State: Louisiana
- Parishes: Iberia, St. Mary

Highway system
- Louisiana State Highway System; Interstate; US; State; Scenic
← LA 82	→ US 84

Louisiana Highway 83 (LA 83) is a state highway located in southern Louisiana. It runs 34.01 miles (54.73 km) in a general east–west direction from LA 14 in New Iberia to LA 182 in Baldwin.

The route essentially forms a loop off of U.S. Highway 90 (US 90). It dips southward from New Iberia, the seat of Iberia Parish, through the community of Lydia and crosses Weeks Island, a salt dome located within the wetlands along the Gulf Intracoastal Waterway. After crossing into St. Mary Parish, LA 83 traverses the small rural communities of Louisa, Glencoe, and Four Corners en route to the town of Baldwin. LA 83 serves to connect these locations with US 90, the area's main highway, with which it shares two interchanges and passes near a third. LA 83 also provides access to Cypremort Point State Park, located along LA 319 on a peninsula that juts out into Vermilion Bay.

LA 83 was designated in the 1955 Louisiana Highway renumbering, replacing three shorter routes. These included State Route 157 from New Iberia to Weeks Island, State Route 903 between Weeks Island and Louisa, and State Route 59 from Louisa to Baldwin.

== Route description ==
From the west, LA 83 begins at a junction with LA 14 (Center Street) at the southwestern edge of the city of New Iberia. The route heads southward on Weeks Island Road and has access to two consecutive exits on US 90, the first being via Parish Road 605 (South Lewis Street), connecting with Lafayette and Morgan City. After the surroundings transition to rural farmland, LA 83 makes a zig zag through the community of Lydia and intersects LA 85, which leads to Patoutville and Jeanerette. Resuming its southward course, LA 83 traverses a remote stretch of wetlands, which includes a swing bridge across Bayou Patout, before crossing a salt dome known as Weeks Island.

After crossing from Iberia Parish into St. Mary Parish, LA 83 intersects LA 319, which leads to Cypremort Point State Park. The route then curves east with the Louisiana and Delta Railroad (LDRR) line and passes alongside the small community of Louisa. LA 83 curves northward through an area known as Glencoe flanked by the railroad and Bayou Cypremort. The roadway curves eastward again at a junction with LA 318 at Four Corners, which provides another connection to Jeanerette. Upon reaching its final destination, the town of Baldwin, LA 83 widens to a divided four-lane highway and passes through another interchange with US 90. The route ends shortly afterward at an intersection with LA 182 (Main Street), the town's main thoroughfare.

=== Route classification and data ===
LA 83 is classified by the Louisiana Department of Transportation and Development (La DOTD) as a rural major collector over most its route. It becomes an urban collector at either end as the route approaches the corporate limits of New Iberia and Baldwin. Daily traffic volume in 2013 peaked at 4,400 vehicles in the New Iberia area and generally averaged below 2,000 vehicles otherwise. The posted speed limit ranges from 45 mph (70 km/h) to 55 mph (90 km/h) over the course of the route.

== History ==
In the original Louisiana Highway system in use between 1921 and 1955, LA 83 was part of three shorter routes, including State Route 157 from the western terminus to Weeks Island; State Route 903 to Louisa; and State Route 59 to Baldwin. These highways were joined under the single designation of LA 83 when the Louisiana Department of Highways renumbered the state highway system in 1955.

La 83—From a junction with La 14 at or near Curtis through or near Lydia and Weeks Island to a junction with La-US 90 at or near Baldwin.

— 1955 legislative route description

As the above description indicates, the western terminus at this time was located outside of the New Iberia city limits. The eastern terminus was also originally a junction with US 90. Over the years, however, US 90 was relocated in stages onto its current alignment, and LA 182 has been extended to cover the bypassed route along Bayou Teche. The current alignment of US 90 crosses LA 83 near each end of its route. The junction on the New Iberia end was completed in 1969 and upgraded in 2004 as an access-controlled interchange. In the late 1970s, the relocation of US 90 was completed to Baldwin with an access-controlled interchange already in place. This interchange was fully opened in October 1979 when US 90 was completed eastward from Baldwin to Calumet. This project also included relocating the eastern portion of LA 83 off of what is now Martin Luther King Jr. Street and onto a new four-lane roadway.

Other portions of LA 83 in St. Mary Parish had been slightly relocated and straightened during the late 1950s. This eliminated four railroad crossings at grade on the original route, which followed Alice B Road through the Louisa area and Freetown Road south of Glencoe. More recently, a small realignment in Iberia Parish occurred when the Bayou Patout swing bridge, constructed in 1949, was replaced with a modern structure in 2011.

== Future ==
La DOTD is currently engaged in a program that aims to transfer about 5,000 miles (8,000 km) of state-owned roadways to local governments over the next several years. Under this plan of "right-sizing" the state highway system, the portion of LA 83 east of LA 318 is proposed for deletion as it no longer meets a significant interurban travel function.

== Major intersections ==
Parish	Location	mi	km	Destinations	Notes
Iberia	New Iberia	0.000	0.000	LA 14 (Center Street) – New Iberia, Abbeville	Western terminus
Iberia		1.183	1.904	PR 605 (South Lewis Street) to US 90 – Lafayette, Morgan City	Exit 129 on US 90
Iberia		2.493– 2.677	4.012– 4.308	US 90 – Lafayette, Morgan City	Exit 130 on US 90
Iberia	Lydia	7.788	12.534	LA 85 (Patoutville Road) – Patoutville, Jeanerette	Western terminus of LA 85; location also known as Boudreaux
Iberia		13.246– 13.316	21.317– 21.430	Bridge over Bayou Patout	
St. Mary	Louisa	17.572	28.279	LA 319	Eastern terminus of LA 319; to Cypremort Point State Park
St. Mary	Four Corners	27.145– 27.357	43.686– 44.027	LA 318 – Jeanerette	Southern terminus of LA 318
St. Mary	Baldwin	32.638– 32.939	52.526– 53.010	US 90 – Morgan City, Lafayette	Interchange; exit 148 on US 90
St. Mary	Baldwin	33.984– 34.013	54.692– 54.739	LA 182 (Main Street)	Eastern terminus
1.000 mi = 1.609 km; 1.000 km = 0.621 mi
