= List of state highways in Louisiana (300–349) =

The following is a list of state highways in the U.S. state of Louisiana designated in the 300-349 range.

== Louisiana Highway 300 ==
Louisiana Highway 300
- Location: Delacroix–Sebastopol
- Length: 15.05 mi (24.22 km)
- Existed: 1955–present

Louisiana Highway 300 (LA 300) runs 15.05 miles (24.22 km) in a southeast to northwest direction from a dead end in Delacroix to a junction with LA 39 and LA 46 at Sebastopol, St. Bernard Parish.

LA 300 heads northward from the fishing communities of Delacroix and Reggio. The winding and notoriously dangerous road meets LA 46 north of Reggio and turns westward. This section of LA 300 parallels the newer four-lane highway carrying LA 46 to the north. LA 300 proceeds for about 6 miles (9.7 km) farther to its terminus at Sebastopol. It is an undivided two-lane highway for its entire length.

In 1997, the Louisiana DOTD controversially placed two barriers in the road, effectively dividing it into three dead end segments, in an effort to encourage drivers to use the then-newly constructed LA 46, the Judge Perez Extension, which was 4 lanes and divided, saving Bayou Road for more local traffic, as the road has no shoulder at points.

The entire highway is in St. Bernard Parish.

Location	mi	km	Destinations	Notes
Delacroix	0.0	0.0	Dead end south of Bayou Lery	Southern terminus
Reggio	7.4	11.9	LA 46 (Florissant Highway) – Yscloskey, Shell Beach, Hopedale	
Toca	12.7	20.4	LA 1245 north	Southern terminus of LA 1245
Sebastopol	15.1	24.3	LA 39 / LA 46 (Bayou Road, East Judge Perez Drive) – Poydras, Chalmette	Northern terminus
1.000 mi = 1.609 km; 1.000 km = 0.621 mi

== Louisiana Highway 301 ==
Louisiana Highway 301
- Location: Jefferson Parish
- Length: 2.98 mi (4.80 km)
- Existed: 1955–present

Louisiana Highway 301 (LA 301) runs 2.98 miles (4.80 km) in a southwest to northeast direction along Barataria Boulevard from a dead end at Bayou Villars to LA 45 north of Jean Lafitte, Jefferson Parish.

LA 301 follows the west bank of Bayou Barataria and begins at a point where the bayou is joined by the Gulf Intracoastal Waterway near their intersections with Bayou Villars. After briefly traveling northward, LA 301 curves to the east through a sparsely populated area opposite the town of Jean Lafitte. The route terminates at a T-intersection where southbound LA 45 turns onto a ramp to join LA 3134 (Leo Kerner/Lafitte Parkway) on a high-level bridge across Bayou Barataria into Jean Lafitte. Northbound LA 45 continues straight ahead along the bayou toward Crown Point.

LA 301 is an undivided two-lane highway for its entire length. It is classified as a rural local road by the Louisiana Department of Transportation and Development (La DOTD). The average daily traffic in 2013 was reported as 560 vehicles.

In the pre-1955 state highway system, LA 301 made up the northern portion of State Route 1307. This route continued southward by ferry across Bayou Villars and followed the present LA 3257 to Bayou Rigolettes opposite the small community of Lafitte. In 1948, the ferry service was replaced by the present bridge across Bayou Barataria on nearby LA 302 (former State Route C-2060). This effectively severed the two portions of Route 1307 as the bridge provided access to the lower portion of the route from a different location. The entirety of Route 1307 became LA 301 in the 1955 Louisiana Highway renumbering. In the early 1990s, La DOTD renumbered disconnected portions of several state highway routes, and the southern portion of LA 301 was designated as LA 3257. While LA 301 has been truncated on one end, it has been slightly lengthened on the other end, taking over about 0.5 miles (0.80 km) of LA 45 when the original swing bridge across Bayou Barataria on that route was replaced in 1976 by the current high-level bridge just upstream.

As of 2011, the entire route of LA 301 is proposed for deletion as it does not meet a significant interurban travel function as determined by La DOTD's Road Transfer Program.

The entire route is in Jefferson Parish.

mi	km	Destinations	Notes
0.0	0.0	Dead end at Bayou Villars/Gulf Intracoastal Waterway	Southern terminus
3.0	4.8	LA 45 north (Barataria Boulevard) LA 45 south to LA 3134 (Leo Kerner/Lafitte Parkway)	Northern terminus
1.000 mi = 1.609 km; 1.000 km = 0.621 mi

== Louisiana Highway 302 ==
Louisiana Highway 302
- Location: Barataria–Jean Lafitte
- Length: 0.28 mi (450 m)
- Existed: 1955–present

Louisiana Highway 302 (LA 302) runs 0.28 miles (0.45 km) in an east–west direction along Fisherman Boulevard from LA 3257 in Barataria to LA 45 in the town of Jean Lafitte, Jefferson Parish.

LA 302 connects the two highways by way of a swing bridge over Bayou Barataria built in 1948. It is an undivided two-lane highway for its entire length and is classified as a rural local road by the Louisiana Department of Transportation and Development (La DOTD). The average daily traffic in 2013 was reported as 810 vehicles.

In the pre-1955 state highway system, LA 302 was designated as State Route C-2060. LA 302 was created in the 1955 Louisiana Highway renumbering, and its route has remained the same to the present day.

The entire highway is in Jefferson Parish.

Location	mi	km	Destinations	Notes
Barataria	0.0	0.0	LA 3257 (Privateer Boulevard)	Western terminus
Jean Lafitte	0.3	0.48	LA 45 (Jean Lafitte Boulevard)	Eastern terminus
1.000 mi = 1.609 km; 1.000 km = 0.621 mi

== Louisiana Highway 303 ==
Louisiana Highway 303
- Location: Jean Lafitte
- Length: 1.27 mi (2.04 km)
- Existed: 1955–present

Louisiana Highway 303 (LA 303) runs 1.27 miles (2.04 km) in an east–west direction along Jean Lafitte Boulevard (formerly Rosethorne Road) from LA 45/LA 3134 to a dead end near the Vendome Canal in Jean Lafitte, Jefferson Parish.

LA 303 continues the route of LA 45 eastward along Bayou Barataria, part of the Gulf Intracoastal Waterway, from a T-intersection where the latter turns onto a ramp leading to a high-level bridge over the bayou. LA 45 shares the bridge with LA 3134 (Leo Kerner/Lafitte Parkway), the main route to the New Orleans metropolitan area. LA 303 is an undivided two-lane highway for its entire length. It is classified as a rural minor collector by the Louisiana Department of Transportation and Development (La DOTD). The average daily traffic in 2013 was reported as 560 vehicles.

In the pre-1955 state highway system, LA 303 was designated as State Route 1235. LA 303 was created in the 1955 Louisiana Highway renumbering, extending 0.65 miles (1.05 km) west of its present terminus to the location of the original LA 45 bascule bridge crossing. LA 303 was shortened when LA 45 was re-routed over the current bridge, which was constructed as part of the never-completed Lafitte-Larose Highway (LA 3134) in 1976.

As of 2011, the entire route of LA 303 is proposed for deletion as it does not meet a significant interurban travel function as determined by La DOTD's Road Transfer Program.

The entire highway is in Jean Lafitte, Jefferson Parish.

mi	km	Destinations	Notes
0.0	0.0	LA 45 south (Jean Lafitte Boulevard) – Lafitte LA 45 / LA 3134 north (Leo Kerner/Lafitte Parkway) – New Orleans	Western terminus of LA 303; southern terminus of LA 3134
1.3	2.1	Dead end near Vendome Canal	Eastern terminus
1.000 mi = 1.609 km; 1.000 km = 0.621 mi

== Louisiana Highway 304 ==
Louisiana Highway 304
- Location: Laurel Grove–Chackbay
- Length: 7.05 mi (11.35 km)
- Existed: 1955–present

Louisiana Highway 304 (LA 304) runs 7.05 miles (11.35 km) in a general north–south direction from LA 308 in Laurel Grove to LA 20 in Chackbay, Lafourche Parish.

From the south, LA 304 begins at an intersection with LA 308, which follows the east bank of Bayou Lafourche. It proceeds northeast through rural farmland in an area west of Thibodaux known as Laurel Grove. After about 3.0 miles (4.8 km), the route curves more to the east and traverses an area of light suburban development until it reaches its northern terminus at a junction with LA 20 in the small community of Chackbay.

LA 304 is an undivided two-lane highway for its entire length. The majority of the route is classified as a rural minor collector by the Louisiana Department of Transportation and Development (La DOTD). The average daily traffic in 2013 was reported as 1,490 vehicles.

In the pre-1955 state highway system, LA 304 was designated as State Route 486. LA 304 was created in the 1955 Louisiana Highway renumbering, and its route has remained the same to the present day.

As of 2012, the entire route of LA 304 is proposed for deletion as it does not meet a significant interurban travel function as determined by La DOTD's Road Transfer Program.

The entire highway is in Lafourche Parish.

Location	mi	km	Destinations	Notes
Laurel Grove	0.0	0.0	LA 308 (Bayou Road) – Thibodaux, Napoleonville	Southern terminus
Chackbay	7.1	11.4	LA 20 – Thibodaux, Vacherie	Northern terminus
1.000 mi = 1.609 km; 1.000 km = 0.621 mi

== Louisiana Highway 306 ==
Louisiana Highway 306
- Location: Bayou Gauche–Paradis
- Length: 8.58 mi (13.81 km)
- Existed: 1955–present

Louisiana Highway 306 (LA 306) runs 8.58 miles (13.81 km) in a general north–south direction along Bayou Gauche Road from a dead end in Bayou Gauche to LA 631 in Paradis, St. Charles Parish. The route connects the small community of Bayou Gauche to US 90, the area's main highway.

From the south, LA 306 begins at a small public boat launch and proceeds south a short distance. It then turns sharply to the northwest and travels alongside Bayou Gauche, passing a series of fishing camps and boat houses. After 2.5 miles (4.0 km), LA 306 curves to the north to follow a drainage canal and passes alongside a suburban neighborhood. It then intersects LA 632 (WPA Road), which heads west toward nearby Des Allemands. The two highways run concurrently for a short distance until LA 632 turns east onto Grand Bayou Road. LA 306 continues northward through a largely uninhabited area before intersecting US 90 in the small community of Paradis. LA 306 proceeds northwest for three blocks and terminates at LA 631 (Old Spanish Trail).

LA 306 is an undivided two-lane highway for its entire length. The majority of the route is classified as a rural minor collector by the Louisiana Department of Transportation and Development (La DOTD) with the average daily traffic reported as 3,700 vehicles in 2013.

In the pre-1955 state highway system, LA 306 was designated as State Route 669. LA 306 was created in the 1955 Louisiana Highway renumbering, and its route has remained the same to the present day apart from the smoothing of a sharp curve west of the Grand Bayou Canal bridge. The original alignment followed what is now a local road known as Badeaux Lane.

As of 2011, the entire route of LA 306 is proposed for deletion as it does not meet a significant interurban travel function as determined by La DOTD's Road Transfer Program.

The entire highway is in St. Charles Parish.

Location	mi	km	Destinations	Notes
Bayou Gauche	0.0	0.0	Dead end at Bayou Gauche Boat Launch	Southern terminus
	4.0	6.4	LA 632 west (WPA Road)	South end of LA 632 concurrency
	4.6	7.4	LA 632 east (Grand Bayou Road)	North end of LA 632 concurrency
Paradis	8.4	13.5	US 90 – Boutte, Houma	
Paradis	8.6	13.8	LA 631 (Old Spanish Trail)	Northern terminus
1.000 mi = 1.609 km; 1.000 km = 0.621 mi: Concurrency terminus

== Louisiana Highway 307 ==
Louisiana Highway 307
- Location: Chackbay–Raceland
- Length: 19.35 mi (31.14 km)
- Existed: 1955–present

Louisiana Highway 307 (LA 307) runs 19.35 miles (31.14 km) in a southeast to northwest direction from LA 20 east of Chackbay to LA 182 in Raceland, Lafourche Parish. The route traverses the small neighboring communities of Kraemer and Bayou Boeuf.

From the southeast, LA 307 begins at an intersection with LA 182 less than 0.5 miles (0.80 km) from its junction with US 90 in the far northeast corner of Raceland. The highway winds northward through largely uninhabited swampland, flanked initially by a narrow strip of farmland. After 9.0 miles (14.5 km), LA 307 curves to the west and crosses a vertical lift bridge over Bayou Boeuf just south of Lac des Allemands. It then proceeds through the communities of Bayou Boeuf and Kraemer, the houses of which line the narrow strip of dry land traversed by the highway. Exiting Kraemer, LA 307 curves to the northwest and soon terminates at an intersection with LA 20 east of Chackbay. LA 20 connects with Vacherie to the north and Thibodaux to the southwest.

LA 307 is an undivided two-lane highway for its entire length. It is classified as a rural minor collector by the Louisiana Department of Transportation and Development (La DOTD). The average daily traffic in 2013 was reported as 3,100 vehicles through the populated section between LA 20 and Bayou Boeuf, reduced to 960 vehicles south of the bayou.

In the pre-1955 state highway system, LA 307 was designated as State Route 486 and included only the section of the present route between LA 20 (former State Route 83) and Bayou Boeuf. This became LA 307 in the 1955 Louisiana Highway renumbering. Around 1964, the first bridge across Bayou Boeuf was constructed, linking the highway with a local road on the opposite side that was then taken in by the state highway system as an extension of LA 307. The bridge across Bayou Boeuf was replaced with the current span in 1976.

As of 2011, the entire route of LA 307 is proposed for deletion as it does not meet a significant interurban travel function as determined by La DOTD's Road Transfer Program.

The entire highway is in Lafourche Parish.

Location	mi	km	Destinations	Notes
Raceland	0.0	0.0	LA 182 – Raceland, New Orleans	Southern terminus
Bayou Boeuf	9.3	15.0	Bridge over Bayou Boeuf	
	19.4	31.2	LA 20 – Thibodaux, Vacherie	Northern terminus
1.000 mi = 1.609 km; 1.000 km = 0.621 mi

== Louisiana Highway 308 ==
Louisiana Highway 308
- Location: Golden Meadow–Donaldsonville
- Length: 82.19 mi (132.27 km)
- Existed: 1955–present

Louisiana Highway 308 (LA 308) runs 82.19 miles (132.27 km) from LA 1 in Golden Meadow to LA 3089 in Donaldsonville.

== Louisiana Highway 309 ==
Louisiana Highway 309
- Location: Chacahoula–Brule
- Length: 8.45 mi (13.60 km)
- Existed: 1955–present

Louisiana Highway 309 (LA 309) runs 8.45 miles (13.60 km) in a north–south direction along Brule Guillot Road from LA 20 at Chacahoula, Terrebonne Parish to LA 1 in Brule, Lafourche Parish.

From the south, LA 309 begins at an intersection with LA 20 east of Gibson in Terrebonne Parish. Proceeding northward, LA 309 immediately crosses the BNSF/Union Pacific Railroad tracks at grade and passes underneath the elevated US 90. LA 309 crosses into Lafourche Parish shortly afterward and continues through uninhabited swamp for roughly half of its route. The surroundings transition to farmland mixed with suburban development as the highway approaches the outskirts of Thibodaux. Passing through an area west of Thibodaux known as Brule, LA 309 reaches its end at an intersection with LA 1, which runs alongside Bayou Lafourche.

LA 309 is an undivided two-lane highway for its entire length. The section through Brule is classified as an urban collector by the Louisiana Department of Transportation and Development (La DOTD) with the average daily traffic in 2013 reported as 2,400 vehicles. The uninhabited area south of Brule is classified as a rural minor collector with a lower daily traffic volume of 1,590.

In the pre-1955 state highway system, LA 309 was designated as State Route 28, which also included the section of the present LA 20 between Chacahoula and Gibson. LA 309 was created in the 1955 Louisiana Highway renumbering, and its route has remained the same to the present day.

As of 2011, the entire route of LA 309 is proposed for deletion as it does not meet a significant interurban travel function as determined by La DOTD's Road Transfer Program.

Parish	Location	mi	km	Destinations	Notes
Terrebonne	Chacahoula	0.0	0.0	LA 20 – Gibson, Thibodaux	Southern terminus
Lafourche	Brule	8.5	13.7	LA 1 (St. Mary Street) – Thibodaux, Donaldsonville	Northern terminus
1.000 mi = 1.609 km; 1.000 km = 0.621 mi

== Louisiana Highway 310 ==
Louisiana Highway 310
- Location: Larose
- Length: 0.06 mi (97 m)
- Existed: 1955–2013

Louisiana Highway 310 (LA 310) consisted of a pontoon swing bridge across Bayou Lafourche in Larose, Lafourche Parish. The route was 0.06 miles (0.097 km) long, connecting LA 1 and LA 308 which run along the west and east banks of the bayou, respectively.

LA 310 was an undivided two-lane highway for its entire length. It was classified as an urban collector by the Louisiana Department of Transportation and Development (La DOTD). The average daily traffic in 2013 was reported as 8,500 vehicles.

In the pre-1955 state highway system, LA 310 was designated as State Route C-2198. The bridge was constructed in 1953, replacing a different structure just upstream. The route became LA 310 with the 1955 Louisiana Highway renumbering. It became defunct in March 2013 when a new six-lane vertical lift bridge was completed 0.6 miles (0.97 km) downstream on an extension of LA 657. The pontoon bridge had been closed since August 2012 due to structural deficiencies, and it was demolished soon after its replacement was opened.

The entire highway was in Larose, Lafourche Parish.

mi	km	Destinations	Notes
0.00	0.00	LA 1 north (West 5th Street) – Raceland LA 1 south (West Main Street) – Grand Isle	Southern terminus
0.06	0.097	LA 657 (East Main Street)	Northern terminus
1.000 mi = 1.609 km; 1.000 km = 0.621 mi

== Louisiana Highway 311 ==
Louisiana Highway 311
- Location: Houma–Schriever
- Length: 13.62 mi (21.92 km)
- Existed: 1955–present

Louisiana Highway 311 (LA 311) runs 13.62 miles (21.92 km) in a north–south direction from the junction of LA 182, LA 312, and LA 3197 in Houma to LA 24 in Schriever. For much of the route, it is known as Little Bayou Black Drive as it runs alongside Little Bayou Black.

From its southern terminus in Houma, LA 311 heads northwest concurrent with LA 312 on Little Bayou Black Drive. LA 312 soon departs to the north onto Lafayette Street. LA 311 continues along the north or east bank of Little Bayou Black and crosses the bayou after intersecting LA 664 (St. Charles Street). LA 311 continues northwest, leaving Houma and passing through Central. West of Gray, LA 311 intersects US 90 at exit 200. Further north, in an area known as Magnolia, LA 311 turns east onto St. Bridget Road to its northern terminus at LA 24 in Schriever. LA 311 is an undivided two-lane highway for its entire length.

The entire highway is in Terrebonne Parish.

Location	mi	km	Destinations	Notes
Houma	0.0	0.0	LA 182 (Barrow Street); LA 312 / LA 3197 (Little Bayou Black Drive)	Southern terminus of LA 311 and LA 312; northern terminus of LA 3197; south end of LA 312 concurrency
Houma	0.4	0.64	LA 312 (Lafayette Street)	North end of LA 312 concurrency
Houma	1.4	2.3	LA 664 (St. Charles Street)	Southern terminus of LA 664
	9.9	15.9	US 90 – New Orleans, Morgan City	Exit 200 on US 90
Schriever	13.7	22.0	LA 24 – Thibodaux, Houma	Northern terminus
1.000 mi = 1.609 km; 1.000 km = 0.621 mi: Concurrency terminus

== Louisiana Highway 312 ==
Louisiana Highway 312
- Location: Houma
- Length: 1.24 mi (2.00 km)
- Existed: 1955–present

Louisiana Highway 312 (LA 312) runs 1.24 miles (2.00 km) in a north–south direction, primarily along Lafayette Street, from LA 182/LA 311/LA 3197 to LA 24 in Houma, Terrebonne Parish.

The route begins at Barrow Street, a junction with LA 182 and LA 3197. It heads northwest along Little Bayou Black Drive for a few blocks in a concurrency with LA 311 before turning north onto Lafayette Street. LA 312 then intersects LA 3040, which follows Honduras Street eastbound and Bond Street westbound. The route ends at LA 24, which travels along either side of Bayou Terrebonne. After crossing the eastbound lanes on Main Street, LA 312 crosses the bayou and intersects the westbound lanes on Park Avenue.

LA 312 is an undivided two-lane highway for its entire length. It is classified as an urban minor arterial by the Louisiana Department of Transportation and Development (La DOTD). The average daily traffic in 2013 was reported as 6,700 vehicles.

In the pre-1955 state highway system, LA 312 was part of State Route 1092, a designation given to former alignments of State Route 2, which was concurrent with US 90 throughout the state after 1926. LA 312 was created in the 1955 Louisiana Highway renumbering, and its route has remained the same to the present day.

As of 2011, the entire route of LA 312 (except the brief segment co-signed with LA 311) is proposed for deletion as it does not meet a significant interurban travel function as determined by La DOTD's Road Transfer Program.

The entire highway is in Houma, Terrebonne Parish.

mi	km	Destinations	Notes
0.0	0.0	LA 182 (Barrow Street); LA 311 / LA 3197 (Little Bayou Black Drive)	Southern terminus of LA 311 and LA 312; northern terminus of LA 3197; South end of LA 311 concurrency
0.4	0.64	LA 311 (Little Bayou Black Drive)	North end of LA 311 concurrency
0.8	1.3	LA 3040 (Honduras Street, Bond Street)	One-way couplet
1.3	2.1	LA 24 (Main Street, Park Avenue)	Northern terminus; one-way couplet
1.000 mi = 1.609 km; 1.000 km = 0.621 mi: Concurrency terminus

== Louisiana Highway 315 ==
Louisiana Highway 315
- Location: Terrebonne Parish
- Length: 20.31 mi (32.69 km)
- Existed: 1955–present

Louisiana Highway 315 (LA 315) runs 20.31 miles (32.69 km) in a north–south direction from a local road south of Theriot to the junction of LA 182 and LA 3197 in Houma, Terrebonne Parish.

LA 315 begins on Bayou Du Large Road as it transitions from parish to state maintenance. It follows the east bank of Bayou Du Large through the communities of Theriot, Sunrise, and Crozier before reaching a bridge over the Gulf Intracoastal Waterway just south of Houma. LA 315 loops underneath the bridge, intersects LA 661, and then proceeds northwest across the bridge into the city of Houma. Here, it reaches its northern terminus at LA 182 and LA 3197. The former continues west along Bayou Black Drive toward Gibson and ahead into Houma on Barrow Street.

The entire highway is in Terrebonne Parish.

Location	mi	km	Destinations	Notes
	0.0	0.0	Begin state maintenance	Southern terminus
	19.5	31.4	LA 661	Interchange; southern terminus of LA 661
Houma	19.5	31.4	Bridge over Gulf Intracoastal Waterway	
Houma	20.3	32.7	LA 182 (Bayou Black Drive, Barrow Street) – Houma, Morgan City; LA 3197 (Bayou Black Drive)	Northern terminus of LA 315; southern terminus of LA 3197
1.000 mi = 1.609 km; 1.000 km = 0.621 mi

== Louisiana Highway 316 ==
Louisiana Highway 316
- Location: Gray–Bourg
- Length: 16.90 mi (27.20 km)
- Existed: 1955–present

Louisiana Highway 316 (LA 316) runs 16.90 miles (27.20 km) in a northwest to southeast direction from LA 24 in Gray to a second junction with LA 24 in Bourg, Terrebonne Parish. The route parallels LA 24 for its entire length and mostly carries the local name of Bayou Blue Road.

LA 316 heads northeast from LA 24 in Gray for a short distance before curving to the southeast into Lafourche Parish. The highway travels alongside the remains of Bayou Blue, the location of the parish line, and passes through a diamond interchange with US 90 at Exit 204. Continuing southeast through Savoie, LA 316 crosses LA 182. A few miles later, it intersects LA 3087 and LA 660. Nearing the end of its route, LA 316 crosses the Gulf Intracoastal Waterway on the Bayou Blue Bridge. It then turns southward onto Company Canal Road, immediately crossing back into Terrebonne Parish, and follows the west bank of the Company Canal to LA 24 in Bourg. LA 316 is an undivided two-lane highway for its entire length.

Parish	Location	mi	km	Destinations	Notes
Terrebonne	Gray	0.0	0.0	LA 24 (Main Street, Park Avenue) – Thibodaux, Houma	Northwestern terminus
Lafourche		2.7	4.3	US 90 – Morgan City, New Orleans	Exit 204 on US 90
Lafourche	Savoie	7.6	12.2	LA 182 (New Orleans Boulevard) – Houma, Raceland	
Lafourche		10.2	16.4	LA 3087 (Prospect Boulevard)	
Lafourche		11.1	17.9	LA 660 (Coteau Road)	Eastern terminus of LA 660
Lafourche		15.1	24.3	Bridge over Gulf Intracoastal Waterway	
Terrebonne	Bourg	16.9	27.2	LA 24 – Houma, Larose	Southeastern terminus
1.000 mi = 1.609 km; 1.000 km = 0.621 mi

== Louisiana Highway 317 ==
Louisiana Highway 317
- Location: Burns Point–Centerville
- Length: 17.26 mi (27.78 km)
- Existed: 1955–present

Louisiana Highway 317 (LA 317) runs 17.26 miles (27.78 km) in a north–south direction from a local road at Burns Point to LA 182 in Centerville, St. Mary Parish.

From the south, LA 317 begins just east of the Burns Point Recreation Area, located on East Cote Blanche Bay. The route proceeds along the west bank of Bayou Sale in a general northeastern direction through the sparsely populated communities of Gordy and Ellerslie. After 10.1 miles (16.3 km), LA 317 crosses a bridge over the Gulf Intracoastal Waterway then passes between a pair of chemical plants at North Bend. 5.0 miles (8.0 km) later, at a point known as Bayou Sale, LA 317 enters into an interchange with US 90, which connects with Lafayette to the northwest and Morgan City to the east. LA 317 then enters the community of Centerville, located southeast of Franklin alongside Bayou Teche, where it reaches its northern terminus at a junction with LA 182 (East Main Street).

LA 317 is an undivided two-lane highway for its entire length. It is classified by the Louisiana Department of Transportation and Development (La DOTD) as a rural major collector, except for the section north of US 90, which is an urban collector. The average daily traffic in 2013 was reported as 420 vehicles south of the Gulf Intracoastal Waterway bridge, increasing to 2,300 vehicles between the bridge and Centerville.

In the pre-1955 state highway system, LA 317 was designated as State Route 60. LA 317 was created in the 1955 Louisiana Highway renumbering, and its route has remained the same to the present day.

As of 2011, the entire route of LA 317 south of the GIWW bridge is proposed for deletion as it does not meet a significant interurban travel function as determined by La DOTD's Road Transfer Program.

The entire highway is in St. Mary Parish.

Location	mi	km	Destinations	Notes
Burns Point	0.0	0.0	United Gas Lane	Southern terminus
North Bend	10.1– 10.8	16.3– 17.4	Bridge over Gulf Intracoastal Waterway	
Bayou Sale	16.1	25.9	US 90 – Morgan City, Lafayette	Interchange; exit 159 on US 90
Centerville	17.3	27.8	LA 182 (East Main Street) – Franklin, Patterson	Northern terminus
1.000 mi = 1.609 km; 1.000 km = 0.621 mi

== Louisiana Highway 318 ==
Louisiana Highway 318
- Location: St. Mary Parish
- Length: 4.66 mi (7.50 km)
- Existed: 1955–present

Louisiana Highway 318 (LA 318) runs 4.66 miles (7.50 km) in a north–south direction from LA 83 west of Baldwin to LA 182 at Sorrel, St. Mary Parish.

LA 318 begins at a T-intersection with LA 83 where the latter turns from north to east toward Baldwin. LA 318 proceeds northeast through rural farmland and intersects LA 668 after 1.8 miles (2.9 km). Shortly afterward, the highway intersects US 90, connecting with Lafayette to the northwest and Morgan City to the southeast. LA 318 continues for another 2.0 miles (3.2 km) to the community of Sorrel, located on Bayou Teche just southeast of Jeanerette.

LA 318 is an undivided two-lane highway for its entire length. It is classified by the Louisiana Department of Transportation and Development (La DOTD) as a rural major collector, except the final 0.4 miles (0.64 km) where it is an urban collector. The average daily traffic in 2013 was reported as 1,780 vehicles.

In the pre-1955 state highway system, LA 318 was designated as State Route 912. LA 318 was created in the 1955 Louisiana Highway renumbering, and its route has remained the same to the present day.

The entire highway is in St. Mary Parish.

Location	mi	km	Destinations	Notes
	0.0	0.0	LA 83 – Baldwin, New Iberia	Southern terminus
	1.8	2.9	LA 668 – Jeanerette	Eastern terminus of LA 668
	2.7	4.3	US 90 – Morgan City, Lafayette	exit 144 on US 90
Sorrel	4.7	7.6	LA 182 – Jeanerette, Franklin	Northern terminus
1.000 mi = 1.609 km; 1.000 km = 0.621 mi

== Louisiana Highway 319 ==
Louisiana Highway 319
- Location: Cypremort Point–Louisa
- Length: 8.03 mi (12.92 km)

Louisiana Highway 319 (LA 319) is a 8-mile-long (13 km) state highway in rural St. Mary Parish. It provides the only road access to Cypremort Point from the mainland. Beginning at a private road in Cypremort Point, it heads northeast passing rows of houses affronting Vermilion Bay. The road crosses a small canal and parallels it for some distance. After passing the access road to Cypremort Point State Park, the density of houses lining the highway diminishes in favor of more swampland. LA 319 climbs in elevation to cross the Louisa Bridge, a high double-bascule drawbridge opened in 2005 over the Bayou Cypremort, part of the Gulf Intracoastal Waterway. After descending from the bridge, the highway curves to the east and ends at a T-intersection with LA 83 in the community of Louisa.

A portion of the road south of the state park entrance is proposed to be transferred to local government under the La DOTD's Road Transfer Program.

== Louisiana Highway 320 ==
Louisiana Highway 320
- Location: Olivier–Morbihan
- Length: 2.40 mi (3.86 km)

Louisiana Highway 320 (LA 320) is a 2.4-mile-long (3.9 km) state highway in Iberia Parish. It connects unincorporated villages east of New Iberia near the Bayou Teche. Beginning at LA 182, it heads to the north-northeast first crossing Bayou Teche on a small swing bridge. Shortly afterwards, it intersects LA 87. Past this intersection, the highway passes houses before curving to due north. After passing a few more houses, it reaches its end at a roundabout with LA 86 just south of Bayou Teche.

The part of LA 320 north of LA 87 is set to be transferred to local jurisdiction under the La DOTD's Road Transfer Program.

Major junctions

The entire route is in Iberia Parish.

Location	mi	km	Destinations	Notes
Olivier	0.00	0.00	LA 182 (Old Spanish Trail) / Darnall Road	
Olivier	0.32	0.51	LA 87 (Old Jeanerette Road) – Jeanerette, New Iberia	
	2.40	3.86	LA 86 (Loreauville Road) / Belle Place Olivier Road – Morbihan, Loreauville	Roundabout
1.000 mi = 1.609 km; 1.000 km = 0.621 mi

== Louisiana Highway 321 ==
Louisiana Highway 321
- Location: Ruth
- Length: 3.60 mi (5.79 km)

Louisiana Highway 321 (LA 321) is a 3.6-mile (5.8 km) state highway near the village of Ruth, St. Martin Parish. It travels along the north side of Bayou Teche between LA 351 and LA 347. Throughout its entire length, it carries the name Hebert Lane and passes some houses and occasionally a farm field. Under the La DOTD's Road Transfer Program, the entirety of LA 321 is set to be transferred from the state highway system to local jurisdiction.

== Louisiana Highway 322 ==
Louisiana Highway 322
- Location: Franklin
- Length: 1.27 mi (2.04 km)
- Existed: 1955–present

Louisiana Highway 322 (LA 322) runs 1.27 miles (2.04 km) in a general east–west direction from LA 182 to LA 87 in Franklin, St. Mary Parish.

LA 322 is a short connector, heading east along Sterling Road from LA 182 (Main Street) next to Franklin Cemetery. After 0.7 miles (1.1 km), the route turns south and crosses a swing bridge over Bayou Teche. It then passes through rural farmland briefly before terminating at LA 87 east of town.

LA 322 is an undivided two-lane highway for its entire length. It is classified as an urban collector by the Louisiana Department of Transportation and Development (La DOTD). The average daily traffic in 2013 was reported as 2,600 vehicles within Franklin, dropping to 860 outside the city limits.

In the pre-1955 state highway system, the portion of LA 322 following Sterling Road was part of State Route 900. The remaining portion made up all of State Route C-1898. LA 322 was created in the 1955 Louisiana Highway renumbering, the north–south portion of its route having originally followed a parallel alignment prior to the replacement of the Sterling Bridge in 1971.

As of 2011, the entire route of LA 322 is proposed for deletion as it does not meet a significant interurban travel function as determined by La DOTD's Road Transfer Program.

The entire highway is in St. Mary Parish.

Location	mi	km	Destinations	Notes
Franklin	0.0	0.0	LA 182 (Main Street)	Western terminus
Sterling/Caffery	0.8	1.3	Bridge over Bayou Teche	
Franklin	1.3	2.1	LA 87	Eastern terminus
1.000 mi = 1.609 km; 1.000 km = 0.621 mi

== Louisiana Highway 323 ==
Louisiana Highway 323
- Location: Oaklawn
- Length: 0.48 mi (770 m)
- Existed: 1955–present

Louisiana Highway 323 (LA 323) runs 0.48 miles (0.77 km) in an east–west direction from Irish Bend Road to LA 87 at Oaklawn, St. Mary Parish.

LA 323 consists largely of a swing bridge constructed in 1942 over Bayou Teche northeast of Franklin. The bridge connects LA 87, which follows the north or east bank of the bayou, with Irish Bend Road, a local road that follows the opposite bank.

LA 323 is an undivided two-lane highway for its entire length. It is classified as an urban collector by the Louisiana Department of Transportation and Development (La DOTD). The average daily traffic in 2013 was reported as 310 vehicles.

In the pre-1955 state highway system, LA 323 was designated as State Route C-1899. LA 323 was created in the 1955 Louisiana Highway renumbering, and its route has remained the same to the present day.

The entire highway is in Oaklawn, St. Mary Parish.

mi	km	Destinations	Notes
0.0	0.0	Irish Bend Road	Western terminus
0.3	0.48	Bridge over Bayou Teche	
0.5	0.80	LA 87	Eastern terminus
1.000 mi = 1.609 km; 1.000 km = 0.621 mi

== Louisiana Highway 324 ==
Louisiana Highway 324
- Location: Charenton
- Length: 0.13 mi (210 m)
- Existed: 1955–present

Louisiana Highway 324 (LA 324) runs 0.13 miles (0.21 km) in an east–west direction from LA 326 to LA 87 in Charenton, St. Mary Parish.

LA 324 consists largely of a swing bridge constructed in 1941 over Bayou Teche north of Baldwin. The bridge connects LA 87 and LA 326, which follow opposite banks of the bayou.

LA 324 is an undivided two-lane highway for its entire length. It is classified as a rural major collector by the Louisiana Department of Transportation and Development (La DOTD). The average daily traffic in 2013 was reported as 1,110 vehicles.

In the pre-1955 state highway system, LA 324 made up the southern end of State Route 129. LA 324 was created in the 1955 Louisiana Highway renumbering, and its route has remained the same to the present day.

The entire highway is in Charenton, St. Mary Parish.

mi	km	Destinations	Notes
0.0	0.0	LA 326 (Chitimacha Trail) – Baldwin, Franklin	Western terminus
0.1	0.16	Bridge over Bayou Teche	
0.2	0.32	LA 87	Eastern terminus
1.000 mi = 1.609 km; 1.000 km = 0.621 mi

== Louisiana Highway 325 ==
Louisiana Highway 325
- Location: Venice–Boothville
- Length: 4.4 mi (7.1 km)
- Existed: 1955–1970

Louisiana Highway 325 (LA 325) ran approximately 4.4 miles (7.1 km) in a north–south direction from LA 23 in Venice to a second junction with LA 23 in Boothville, Plaquemines Parish.

The route traveled alongside the west bank levee of the Mississippi River. It began at the southern terminus of LA 23 at Grand Pass in Venice and followed a parallel course until making a jog back to LA 23 in Boothville opposite Hospital Bay.

In the pre-1955 state highway system, LA 325 was designated as State Route C-2168. LA 325 was created in the 1955 Louisiana Highway renumbering and deleted from the state highway system in 1970.

The entire highway was in Plaquemines Parish.

Location	mi	km	Destinations	Notes
Venice	0.0	0.0	LA 23	Southern terminus of LA 23 and LA 325
Boothville	4.4	7.1	LA 23	Northern terminus
1.000 mi = 1.609 km; 1.000 km = 0.621 mi

== Louisiana Highway 326 ==
Louisiana Highway 326
- Location: Baldwin–Charenton
- Length: 3.81 mi (6.13 km)

Louisiana Highway 326 (LA 326) is a 3.81-mile-long (6.13 km) state highway in St. Mary Parish. It connects the town of Baldwin at LA 182 and Charenton where the road continues as Chitimacha Trail.

In Baldwin, LA 326 travels north-northeast along Charenton Road paralleling Bayou Teche and passing farmland and many houses. The name of the highway becomes Chitimacha Trail as it continues towards Charenton. At Martin Luther King Road, the highway makes a slight curve before heading back towards the north towards the downtown area. After intersecting LA 324 at Convent Street, the highway ends shortly thereafter coinciding with a sharp bend in the road and in the bayou. Under the La DOTD's Road Transfer Program, all of LA 326 is proposed to be transferred to local governments.

Major junctions

The entire route is in St. Mary Parish.

Location	mi	km	Destinations	Notes
Baldwin	0.00	0.00	LA 182 (Main Street) – Franklin, Jeanerette	
Charenton	3.64	5.86	LA 324 east (Convent Street)	Western terminus of LA 324
Charenton	3.81	6.13	Chitimacha Trail	
1.000 mi = 1.609 km; 1.000 km = 0.621 mi

== Louisiana Highway 327 ==
Louisiana Highway 327
- Location: St. Gabriel–Baton Rouge
- Length: 15.36 mi (24.72 km)

Louisiana Highway 327 (LA 327) runs 15.36 miles (24.72 km) from St. Gabriel to Baton Rouge.

== Louisiana Highway 328 ==
Louisiana Highway 328
- Location: Breaux Bridge–Cecilia
- Length: 7.82 mi (12.59 km)

Louisiana Highway 328 (LA 328) runs 7.82 miles (12.59 km) from Breaux Bridge to Cecilia.

== Louisiana Highway 329 ==
Louisiana Highway 329
- Location: Avery Island–New Iberia
- Length: 6.05 mi (9.74 km)

Louisiana Highway 329 (LA 329) runs 6.05 miles (9.74 km) from Avery Island to New Iberia.

== Louisiana Highway 330 ==
Louisiana Highway 330
- Location: Abbeville–Delcambre
- Length: 17.20 mi (27.68 km)

Louisiana Highway 330 (LA 330) runs 17.20 miles (27.68 km) from Abbeville to Delcambre.

== Louisiana Highway 331 ==
Louisiana Highway 331
- Location: Boston–Erath
- Length: 6.07 mi (9.77 km)

Louisiana Highway 331 (LA 331) runs 6.07 miles (9.77 km) from Boston to Erath.

== Louisiana Highway 332 ==
Louisiana Highway 332
- Location: Gueydan
- Length: 3.50 mi (5.63 km)

Louisiana Highway 332 (LA 332) runs 3.50 miles (5.63 km) in Gueydan.

== Louisiana Highway 333 ==
Louisiana Highway 333
- Location: Intracoastal City–Esther
- Length: 7.87 mi (12.67 km)

Louisiana Highway 333 (LA 333) runs 7.87 miles (12.67 km) from Intracoastal City to Esther.

== Louisiana Highway 335 ==
Louisiana Highway 335
- Location: Vermilion Parish–Abbeville
- Length: 17.58 mi (28.29 km)

Louisiana Highway 335 (LA 335) runs 17.58 miles (28.29 km) from Vermilion Parish to Abbeville.

== Louisiana Highway 336 ==
Louisiana Highway 336
- Location: Breaux Bridge
- Length: 0.94 mi (1,510 m)

Louisiana Highway 336 (LA 336) runs 0.94 miles (1.51 km) in Breaux Bridge.

== Louisiana Highway 338 ==
Louisiana Highway 338
- Location: Abbeville–Charon
- Length: 7.49 mi (12.05 km)

Louisiana Highway 338 (LA 338) runs 7.49 miles (12.05 km) from Abbeville to Charon.

== Louisiana Highway 339 ==
Louisiana Highway 339
- Location: Erath–Lafayette
- Length: 13.567 mi (21.834 km)
- Existed: 1955–present

Louisiana Highway 339 (LA 339) runs 13.567 miles (21.834 km) in a north–south direction from LA 14 Business in Erath, Vermilion Parish to LA 3073 in Lafayette, Lafayette Parish. The road serves as a primary corridor for growing residential development in southeastern Lafayette Parish.

The route heads due north from the east edge of Erath and intersects mainline LA 14 (Veterans Memorial Drive), connecting with Abbeville to the west and Delcambre to the east. Traveling through a mixture of rural farmland and suburban development, LA 339 intersects LA 338 in an area known as Charon. Continuing north, the highway crosses from Vermilion Parish into Lafayette Parish. Shortly afterward, LA 339 makes a jog onto Verot School Road, a parallel section line road, and proceeds north along the west side of Youngsville. At a point known as New Flanders within the city limits, the highway passes through a roundabout intersection with LA 92. Northwest of Youngsville, LA 339 enters the outskirts of the city of Lafayette, becoming Verot School Road. The highway widens to a four-lane divided arterial, shortly before reaching its northern terminus at LA 3073 (Ambassador Caffery Parkway), which connects with US 167 to the northwest. Prior to 2021, LA 339 continued northeast on Verot School Road to end at LA 182 (West Pinhook Road).

LA 339 is an undivided two-lane highway for most of its length. It is generally classified by the Louisiana Department of Transportation and Development (La DOTD) as a rural major collector south of Youngsville and as an urban minor arterial through the Lafayette area. The average daily traffic in 2013 was reported as 4,100 vehicles south of Youngsville, increasing to 7,000 through the Youngsville area, and reaching a high of 33,600 through the Lafayette area.

In the pre-1955 state highway system, the section of LA 339 running through Vermilion Parish made up the majority of State Route 148, which also included the route of present-day LA 685 south of Erath. The section of present LA 339 within Lafayette Parish made up all of pre-1955 State Route 680 with a small section of State Route 236 connecting it to Route 148 at the parish line. LA 339 was created in the 1955 Louisiana Highway renumbering, and its route has remained the same apart from the smoothing of small sections in Lafayette.

In 2021, the portion of LA 339 between LA 3073 and LA 182 was removed from the state highway system and transferred to local control.

Parish	Location	mi	km	Destinations	Notes
Vermilion	Erath	0.000	0.000	LA 14 Bus. (East Lastie Street)	Southern terminus
Vermilion	Erath	0.214– 0.233	0.344– 0.375	LA 14 (Veterans Memorial Drive) – Erath, Delcambre	
Vermilion	Charon	4.470	7.194	LA 338 – Abbeville	Northeastern terminus of LA 338
Lafayette		7.523	12.107	LA 339 Spur (Chemin Agreable Road) – Youngsville	Western terminus of LA 339 Spur
Lafayette	Youngsville	11.009– 11.078	17.717– 17.828	LA 92 west (East Milton Avenue) – Youngsville, Milton	Roundabout; eastern terminus of LA 92; location also known as New Flanders
Lafayette	Lafayette	13.567	21.834	LA 3073 (Ambassador Caffery Parkway) – Scott, Broussard	Northern terminus
1.000 mi = 1.609 km; 1.000 km = 0.621 mi

== Louisiana Highway 341 ==
Louisiana Highway 341
- Location: St. Martin Parish
- Length: 4.2 mi (6.8 km)
- Existed: 1955–present

Louisiana Highway 341 (LA 341) runs 4.20 miles (6.76 km) in a north–south direction along DeClouet Highway in a loop off of LA 31 north of Breaux Bridge, St. Martin Parish.

The route begins at a point on LA 31 opposite Bayou Teche from the city of Breaux Bridge. It proceeds north through an area of mixed farmland and light suburban development to an intersection with LA 31.

LA 341 is an undivided two-lane highway for its entire length. It is classified as a rural local road by the Louisiana Department of Transportation and Development (La DOTD). The average daily traffic in 2013 was reported as 2,000 vehicles.

In the pre-1955 state highway system, LA 341 was designated as State Route 355. LA 341 was created in the 1955 Louisiana Highway renumbering, and its route has remained the same until 2015, when the designation was extended northward over the former LA 354.

As of 2011, the entire route of LA 341 is proposed for deletion as it does not meet a significant interurban travel function as determined by La DOTD's Road Transfer Program.

The entire route is in St. Martin Parish.

mi	km	Destinations	Notes
0.0	0.0	LA 31 (Main Highway) – Breaux Bridge, Arnaudville	Southern terminus
4.2	6.8	LA 31 (Main Highway) – Breaux Bridge, Arnaudville	Northern terminus
1.000 mi = 1.609 km; 1.000 km = 0.621 mi

== Louisiana Highway 342 ==
Louisiana Highway 342
- Location: Acadia Parish–Lafayette Parish
- Length: 12.45 mi (20.04 km)
- Existed: 1955–present

Louisiana Highway 342 (LA 342) runs 12.45 miles (20.04 km) in an east–west direction from LA 35 south of Rayne, Acadia Parish to LA 93-1 in Lafayette, Lafayette Parish.

The route heads east from LA 35 in southeastern Acadia Parish and crosses into Lafayette Parish after a short distance. It intersects LA 343 in an area known as Ridge. LA 342 then turns due north and has a brief concurrency with LA 724 in Judice before resuming an eastward course. It reaches its terminus 3.0 miles (4.8 km) later, engaging in a roundabout with LA 93-1 just inside the Lafayette city limits.

== Louisiana Highway 343 ==
Louisiana Highway 343
- Location: Abbeville–Cankton
- Length: 29.04 mi (46.74 km)
- Existed: 1955–present

Louisiana Highway 343 (LA 343) runs 29.04 miles (46.74 km) in a north–south direction from LA 14 west of Abbeville, Vermilion Parish to LA 356 at Bristol, St. Landry Parish.

The route heads due north from LA 14 and makes a brief zigzag via LA 699 at Leroy. After crossing from Vermilion Parish into Lafayette Parish, LA 343 passes along the eastern edge of Duson, where it crosses over but does not intersect I-10. North of Duson, LA 343 zigzags along section line roads into the eastern edge of Acadia Parish. After a brief concurrency with LA 98, the route turns due north again into St. Landry Parish and passes to the west of Cankton. LA 343 reaches its terminus at a point on LA 356 known as Bristol.

== Louisiana Highway 344 ==
Louisiana Highway 344
- Location: Morbihan–Loreauville
- Length: 6.44 mi (10.36 km)

Louisiana Highway 344 (LA 344) runs 6.44 miles (10.36 km) from Morbihan to Loreauville.

== Louisiana Highway 345 ==
Louisiana Highway 345
- Location: Loreauville–St. Martinville
- Length: 6.54 mi (10.53 km)

Louisiana Highway 345 (LA 345) runs 6.54 miles (10.53 km) from Loreauville to St. Martinville.

== Louisiana Highway 346 ==
Louisiana Highway 346
- Location: DeSoto Parish
- Length: 11.77 mi (18.94 km)
- Existed: 1955–present

Louisiana Highway 346 (LA 346) runs 11.77 miles (18.94 km) in an east–west direction from LA 513 in Oxford to LA 177 south of Evelyn, DeSoto Parish. During its route, LA 346 runs concurrent with LA 175 for a distance of 1.5 miles (2.4 km).

== Louisiana Highway 347 ==
Louisiana Highway 347
- Location: Daspit–Leonville
- Length: 40.7 mi (65.5 km)

Louisiana Highway 347 (LA 347) runs 40.7 miles (65.5 km) from Daspit to Leonville.

== Louisiana Highway 348 ==
Louisiana Highway 348
- Location: Union Parish
- Length: 6.82 mi (10.98 km)
- Existed: 1955–present

Louisiana Highway 348 (LA 348) runs 6.82 miles (10.98 km) in an east–west direction from LA 549 at Conway to LA 33 southwest of Marion, Union Parish.

== Louisiana Highway 349 ==
Louisiana Highway 349
- Location: Henderson
- Length: 3.44 mi (5.54 km)

Louisiana Highway 349 (LA 349) runs 3.44 miles (5.54 km) in Henderson.
