= Louisiana Highway 85 =

State highway in Louisiana, United States

Louisiana Highway 85

Route information
- Maintained by Louisiana DOTD
- Length: 7.82 mi (12.59 km)
- Existed: 1955 renumbering–present

Major junctions
- West end: LA 83 in Lydia
- Future I-49 / US 90 west of Jeanerette
- East end: LA 182 in Jeanerette

Location
- Country: United States
- State: Louisiana
- Parishes: Iberia

Highway system
- Louisiana State Highway System; Interstate; US; State; Scenic
← US 84	→ LA 86
← SR C-2031	SR C-2032	→ SR C-2033

Louisiana Highway 85 (LA 85) is a state highway located in Iberia Parish, Louisiana. It runs 7.82 miles (12.59 km) in an east–west direction from LA 83 in Lydia to LA 182 in Jeanerette.

The route connects the town of Jeanerette with the rural area along LA 83, which serves the Port of New Iberia and leads to the salt domes of Weeks Island. It is also one of two highways which connect the town to U.S. Highway 90 (US 90), the principal highway through the Teche region and the future corridor of Interstate 49 (I-49).

== Route description ==
From the west, LA 85 begins at an intersection with LA 83 between New Iberia and Weeks Island in an area known as Lydia. It proceeds east along Patoutville Road through a residential neighborhood. After 0.5 miles (0.80 km), the route leaves Lydia, and the surroundings abruptly change to rural farmland with scattered residential development. 2.5 miles (4.0 km) later, LA 85 turns to the northeast and intersects LA 673, which heads south a short distance to Patoutville. Shortly afterward, LA 85 passes through an interchange with US 90 (the future corridor of I-49), which connects to Lafayette on the northwest and Morgan City on the southeast.

1.0 mile (1.6 km) northeast of US 90, LA 85 intersects LA 674 (East Admiral Doyle Drive) and turns southeast, continuing the route of that highway to the southwest corner of Jeanerette. It then turns northeast onto Hubertville Road while LA 668 continues the route southeast to another connection with US 90. After 1.0 mile (1.6 km), LA 85 crosses the BNSF/Union Pacific Railroad tracks at grade and enters the residential area of Jeanerette. The route ends seven blocks later at an intersection with LA 182 (Main Street), the principal highway through town. LA 182 parallels Bayou Teche northwest toward New Iberia and southeast toward Franklin.

The route is classified by the Louisiana Department of Transportation and Development (La DOTD) as a rural major collector from the western terminus to LA 668, the portion of the route flanking US 90. It is classified as an urban collector from LA 668 to Martin Luther King Dr., a local road, and an urban minor arterial from there to its eastern terminus. The average daily traffic volume in 2013 is reported as 1,020 between the western terminus and US 90; increasing to 3,400 between US 90 and LA 668; and 3,700 between LA 668 and the eastern terminus. The route has a posted speed limit of 50 mph (80 km/h) within Lydia, increasing to 55 mph (90 km/h) for the rural segment between Lydia and Jeanerette. The speed limit is then reduced to 45 mph (70 km/h) approaching Martin Luther King Drive in Jeanerette and finally to 35 mph (55 km/h) through the residential section of town between the railroad tracks and LA 182. LA 85 is an undivided, two-lane highway for its entire route.

== History ==
=== Pre-1955 route numbering ===
State Route C-2032
- Location: Iberia Parish
- Length: 8.0 mi (12.9 km)
- Existed: c1940s–1955

In the original Louisiana Highway system in use between 1921 and 1955, the modern LA 85 was initially part of three different routes designated by the state legislature between 1928 and 1930. These were State Route 447 from Lydia to the present LA 673; State Route 1185 between LA 674 and LA 668; and State Route 1193 between LA 668 and LA 182. (The section between LA 673 and LA 674 was a local road.) By the 1950s, the entire route had been unified under the designation of State Route C-2032. Like all state highways created after 1930, Route C-2032 was numbered by the state highway department and carried a "C-" prefix.

The eastern terminus of Route C-2032 in Jeanerette was a junction with State Route 2, which was created in 1921 and followed the Old Spanish Trail across Louisiana. This became the original route of US 90 in 1926 and remained so until after the 1955 Louisiana Highway renumbering.

=== Post-1955 route history ===
LA 85 was created in 1955 as a direct renumbering of State Route C-2032.

La 85—From a junction with La 83 at or near Lydia through or near Patoutville to a junction with La-US 90 at or near Jeanerette.

— 1955 legislative route description

Shortly after the 1955 renumbering, the west end of LA 85 was slightly re-routed. The route originally began 0.4 miles (0.64 km) north of the present intersection with LA 83 and proceeded southeast on what is now PR 214 (Guillot Road), joining the current alignment 0.6 miles (0.97 km) later.

In 1969, US 90 was moved onto its current alignment from Broussard, just south of Lafayette, to LA 85. This alignment bypassed New Iberia, and the old route along Bayou Teche became an extension of LA 182. LA 85 served as a connection for through traffic to the old alignment of US 90 until the new alignment was extended into St. Mary Parish in the mid-1970s.

== Future ==
La DOTD is currently engaged in a program that aims to transfer about 5,000 miles (8,000 km) of state-owned roadways to local governments over the next several years. Under this plan of "right-sizing" the state highway system, the eastern portion of LA 85 between LA 668 and LA 182 is proposed for deletion as it does not meet a significant interurban travel function.

== Major intersections ==
The entire highway is in Iberia Parish.

Location	mi	km	Destinations	Notes
Lydia	0.0	0.0	LA 83 (Weeks Island Road) – New Iberia, Weeks Island	Western terminus; location also known as Boudreaux
	3.0	4.8	LA 673 (Patout Road) – Patoutville	Northern terminus of LA 673
	3.5	5.6	US 90 – Lafayette, Morgan City	Interchange; exit 137 on US 90
	4.5	7.2	LA 674 (East Admiral Doyle Drive) – New Iberia	Southern terminus of LA 674
Jeanerette	6.4	10.3	LA 668 (East Admiral Doyle Drive)	Northern terminus of LA 668
Jeanerette	7.8	12.6	LA 182 (Main Street) – Jeanerette, Franklin	Eastern terminus; location also known as Hubertville
1.000 mi = 1.609 km; 1.000 km = 0.621 mi
