= BBES =

BBES may refer to:

- Bayou Boeuf Elementary School, a public school located in Lafourche Parish, Louisiana
- Broad Brook Elementary School, a public school located in Broad Brook, Connecticut
