= Chackbay, Louisiana =

- Census-designated place
- Location in Louisiana Location in the United States
- Coordinates: 29°53′9″N 90°47′27″W
- Country: United States
- State: Louisiana
- Parish: Lafourche

Area
  - Total: 27.75 sq mi (71.86 km^{2})
  - Land: 27.75 sq mi (71.86 km^{2})
  - Water: 0 sq mi (0.00 km^{2})
- Elevation: 7 ft (2.1 m)

Population (2020)
  - Total: 5,370
  - Density: 193.5/sq mi (74.73/km^{2})
- Time zone: UTC-6 (CST)
  - Summer (DST): UTC-5 (CDT)
- Area code: 985
- FIPS code: 22-14100

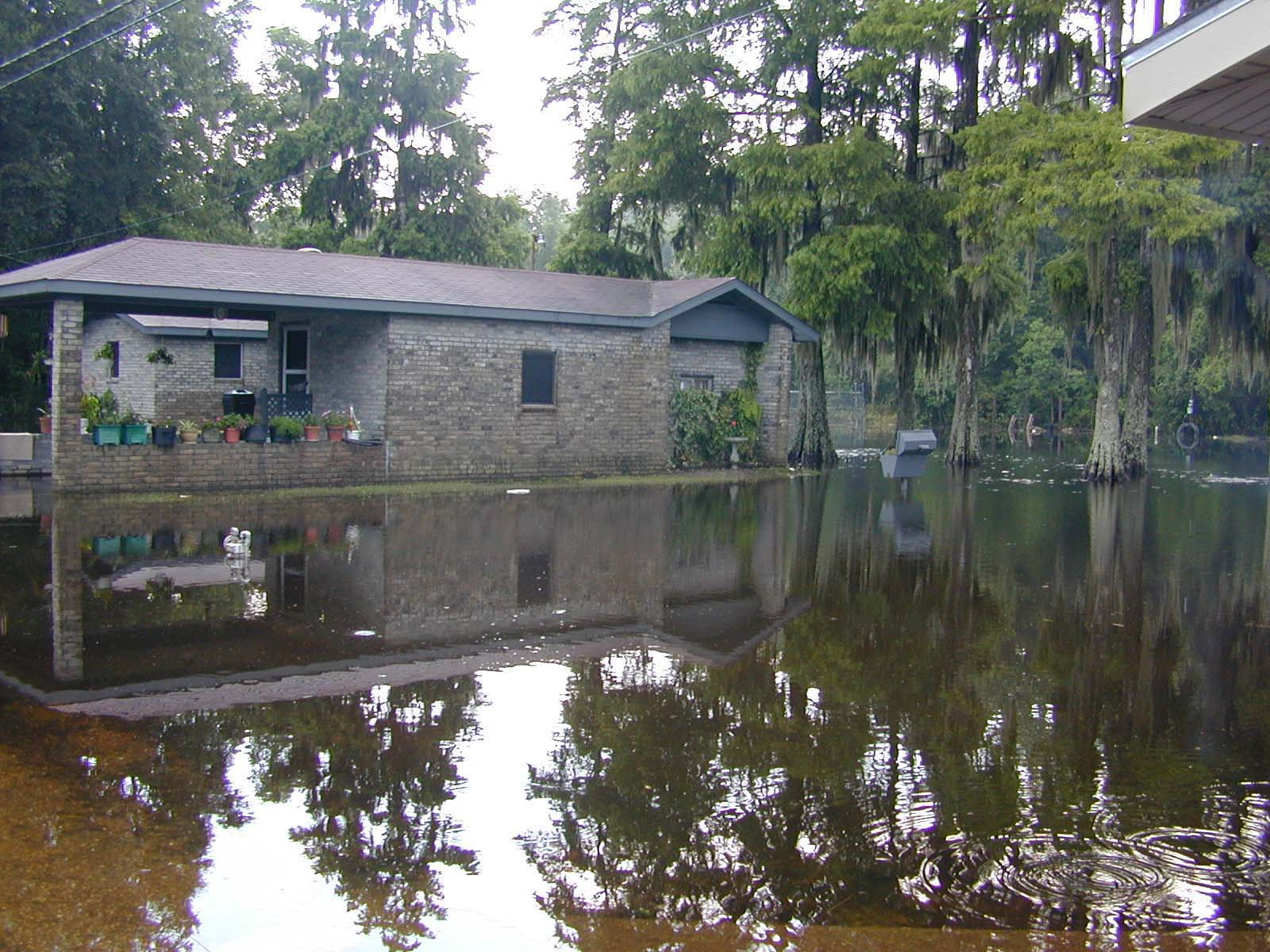
flooded house in Chackbay

Chackbay is a census-designated place (CDP) in northern Lafourche Parish, Louisiana, United States. The population was 5,370 in 2020. It is part of the Houma–Bayou Cane–Thibodaux metropolitan statistical area.

Chackbay is a part of the "Ward 6" area of Lafourche Parish.

== Geography ==
Chackbay is located along the northern edge of Lafourche Parish at 29°53′9″N 90°47′27″W. Its northern boundary is the border with St. James Parish.

Settlement follows the major roads through the community, which follow higher ground. Large areas away from the roads are wetland and mainly undeveloped. Louisiana Highway 20 runs through the western part of the CDP, leading south 7 miles (11 km) to Thibodaux, the parish seat, and northeast 13 miles (21 km) to Vacherie. Highway 304 runs west and southwest from Highway 20 to Bayou Lafourche west of Thibodaux, and Highway 307 runs east to Kraemer. Unincorporated communities within the Chackbay CDP are, from west to east, Choupique, Chegby, and Chackbay.

According to the United States Census Bureau, the Chackbay CDP has a total area of 28.5 square miles (73.9 km^{2}), all of it recorded as land.

== Demographics ==
Historical population
Census	Pop.	Note	%±
1990	2,276		—
2000	4,018		76.5%
2010	5,177		28.8%
2020	5,370		3.7%
U.S. Decennial Census; 1950 1960 1970 1980; 1990 2000 2010

Chackbay first appeared as a census designated place the 1990 U.S. Census.

Chackbay racial composition as of 2020
Race	Number	Percentage
White (non-Hispanic)	4,742	88.31%
Black or African American (non-Hispanic)	245	4.56%
Native American	28	0.52%
Asian	20	0.37%
Other/Mixed	161	3.0%
Hispanic or Latino	174	3.24%

As of the 2020 United States census, there were 5,370 people, 2,003 households, and 1,564 families residing in the CDP.

== Education ==
Lafourche Parish Public Schools is the area school district, and operates area public schools. Chackbay Elementary School serves the community. Sixth Ward Middle School and Thibodaux High School serve residents of the Ward 6 area.

Fletcher Technical Community College has Lafourche Parish in the college's service area. Additionally, a Delgado Community College document stated that Lafourche Parish was in the college's service area.

== Government and infrastructure ==
Residents are served by the Ward 6 Senior Citizens Center.

== Notable people ==
- Dee Dee Blanchard, homicide victim
- Billy Tauzin, US congressman who lived in Clarks Summit while he was in office.
