= Louisiana Highway 89 =

State highway in Louisiana, United States

Louisiana Highway 89
- LA 89 in red, LA 89-1 in magenta, former segment in grey

Route information
- Maintained by Louisiana DOTD
- Length: 12.736 mi (20.497 km)
- Existed: 1955 renumbering–present

Major junctions
- South end: LA 14 in Delcambre
- LA 88 in Lozes
- North end: Church Street in Youngsville

Location
- Country: United States
- State: Louisiana
- Parishes: Vermilion, Iberia, Lafayette

Highway system
- Louisiana State Highway System; Interstate; US; State; Scenic
← LA 88	→ US 90

Louisiana Highway 89 (LA 89) is a state highway located in southern Louisiana. It runs 12.74 miles (20.50 km) in a north–south direction from LA 14 in Delcambre to an intersection with Church Street in Youngsville.

The highway parallels the Vermilion–Iberia parish line from Delcambre, a small town partially located in both parishes, to a junction with LA 88 at Lozes. LA 89 then makes a turn into Lafayette Parish and proceeds to Youngsville, a small city and growing bedroom community of nearby Lafayette. Along its route, the highway passes through a mixture of sugar cane fields, older rural residential development, and newer suburban development.

LA 89 was created in the 1955 Louisiana Highway renumbering from portions of several former state routes. Through most of its existence, the route continued north from Youngsville to a junction with U.S. Highway 90 (US 90) between Lafayette and Broussard. This northern segment became LA 89-1 in 2013 when a portion of the route in Youngsville was transferred to the city following a highway improvement project, which created a gap in state maintenance. In the future, the entire corridor is proposed to be turned over to local control as part of the Louisiana Department of Transportation and Development (La DOTD) road transfer program.

== Route description ==
From the south, LA 89 begins at a junction with LA 14 (Veterans Memorial Drive) in the Vermilion Parish town of Delcambre. LA 14 is a four-lane highway connecting with Abbeville to the west and New Iberia to the east. LA 89 heads north, running parallel to the Iberia Parish line as it bends around the western shore of Lake Peigneur. The highway briefly passes into the northwest corner of Iberia Parish in an area known as Lozes. Here, a T-intersection with LA 88 (Coteau Road) provides a connection to US 90 straight ahead. LA 89 turns west onto Youngsville Road at this junction and crosses into Lafayette Parish.

In Lafayette Parish, LA 89 makes several right-angle turns as it travels into the suburban city of Youngsville. It turns north onto Austin Road, west onto Piat Road across the corporate limits, and north onto Guillot Road. The highway passes a series of small residential subdivisions set among the sugar fields and intersects a growing suburban thoroughfare known as Chemin Metairie Parkway via roundabout. In the center of Youngsville, LA 89 turns west onto Avenue B for one block, then north onto First Street for two blocks to an intersection with Church Street. Here, the LA 89 designation and state maintenance officially end. Through traffic turns east onto Church Street, which immediately curves north onto Lafayette Street, and proceeds to a second roundabout at Iberia Street (a decommissioned portion of LA 92). From this junction, Iberia Street connects with the communities of Milton and Maurice to the west and US 90 to the east. State maintenance resumes northward as LA 89-1.

=== Route classification and data ===
LA 89 is an undivided two-lane highway for its entire length. It is classified by the Louisiana Department of Transportation and Development (La DOTD) as a rural minor collector in Vermilion Parish, an urban collector in Iberia Parish and unincorporated Lafayette Parish, and an urban minor arterial in Youngsville. Daily traffic volume in 2013 ranged between 3,400 and 4,500 vehicles over the entire route. The posted speed limit is generally 55 mph (90 km/h), reduced to 35 mph (55 km/h) in the center of Youngsville.

== History ==
In the original Louisiana Highway system in use between 1921 and 1955, the modern LA 89 was part of two different routes: State Route 448 from Delcambre to Lozes and State Route 539 from Lozes to Youngsville. These routes were added to the state highway system in 1928 and 1930, respectively. Route 448 was an unimproved road within Vermilion Parish until it was graveled in 1933. The remainder of Route 448 to Lozes and the entirety of Route 539 were existing gravel roadways when designated as state highways. The alignment of the portions of both routes now followed by LA 89 remained the same during the pre-1955 era. Only the section between LA 682 and Lozes was paved during this time, apart from some municipal paving in the center of Youngsville.

LA 89 was designated in the 1955 renumbering, creating a continuous route from Delcambre to Youngsville. It also included the current LA 89-1 from Youngsville as far as LA 182 in Broussard, which was at that time a junction with US 90.

La 89—From a junction with La 14 at or near Delcambre through or near Loze[s] and Youngsville to a junction with La-US 90 at or near Broussard.

— 1955 legislative route description

In the early 1960s, US 90 was relocated from what is now LA 182 to its current route, known as the Evangeline Thruway, between Lafayette and Billeaud. In the late 1970s, LA 89 was extended along Southpark Road, an existing local road, providing a state-maintained connection with the new alignment of US 90. The remainder of LA 89 between Delcambre and Youngsville had been paved by the mid-1960s.

In 2013, 0.26 miles (0.42 km) of LA 89 in the center of Youngsville was transferred to the city following a highway improvement project that featured the construction of a new roundabout at the junction with LA 92. This created a discontinuity in state maintenance of LA 89, and the portion of the highway north of the roundabout was re-designated as LA 89-1. In 2024, the portion of LA 89-1 from the roundabout to Heart D Farm Road was removed from the state highway system and transferred to local control. The remainder of LA 89-1 is still under agreement to be removed in the future.

== Future ==
La DOTD is currently engaged in a program that aims to transfer about 5,000 miles (8,000 km) of state-owned roadways to local governments over the next several years. Under this plan of "right-sizing" the state highway system, the entire route of LA 89 is proposed for deletion as it does not meet a significant interurban travel function.

== Major intersections ==
Parish	Location	mi	km	Destinations	Notes
Vermilion	Delcambre	0.000	0.000	LA 14 (Veterans Memorial Drive) – Abbeville, New Iberia	Southern terminus
Vermilion		3.768	6.064	LA 682 (Lake Peigneur Road)	Western terminus of LA 682
Iberia	Lozes	7.002	11.269	LA 88 east (Coteau Road) – Burke	Western terminus of LA 88
Lafayette	Youngsville	12.736	20.497	End state maintenance at junction of First and Church Streets	Northern terminus
1.000 mi = 1.609 km; 1.000 km = 0.621 mi

== Auxiliary route ==
Louisiana Highway 89-1
- Location: Lafayette Parish
- Length: 5.053 mi (8.132 km)
- Existed: 2013–present

Louisiana Highway 89-1 (LA 89-1) runs 5.05 miles (8.13 km) in a north–south direction from the junction of Lafayette and Iberia Streets in Youngsville to US 90 on the Lafayette–Broussard line. It was part of LA 89 until a portion of the route in Youngsville was returned to local control in 2013, creating a gap in state maintenance.

From the south, LA 89-1 begins at a roundabout junction with Iberia Street in the city of Youngsville, connecting with US 90 to the east and the communities of Milton and Maurice to the west. It heads north on Lafayette Street and passes through a mixture of rural farmland and suburban residential development. After the local name changes to Youngsville Highway, LA 89-1 crosses from Youngsville into the city of Broussard. A junction with LA 3073 (Ambassador Caffery Parkway), a four-lane highway, connects with the city of Scott west of Lafayette. Continuing north, LA 89-1 crosses into the corporate limits of Lafayette and intersects LA 182 and the western terminus of LA 182-1 (both West Pinhook Road). The highway curves to the northeast onto Southpark Road, where it runs concurrent with LA 182 and proceeds along a commercial corridor to its northern terminus at US 90 and LA 182 eastbound (Southwest Evangeline Thruway) on the city limits of both Lafayette and Broussard.

LA 89-1 is an undivided two-lane highway for its entire length. It is classified as an urban minor arterial by the Louisiana Department of Transportation and Development (La DOTD). The average daily traffic volume in 2013 ranged between 10,100 and 15,700 vehicles over the entire route. The posted speed limit is generally 55 mph (90 km/h), reduced to 40 mph (65 km/h) in Youngsville.

Prior to the 1955 Louisiana Highway renumbering, LA 89-1 was designated as State Route C-1475. It was a former local road that was improved and paved by the Louisiana Highway Commission in the early 1930s. The entire route was part of LA 89 from 1955 until 2013, when a portion of LA 89 in the center of town was transferred from La DOTD to the city of Youngsville, creating a gap in state maintenance. The transfer was part of a highway improvement project that straightened the route of LA 92 through town and converted its junction with LA 89 to a roundabout. Upon its completion, the northern portion of LA 89 became LA 89-1. In the future, both routes are planned to be decommissioned altogether as part of La DOTD's road transfer program.

Major intersections
The entire highway is in Lafayette Parish.

Location	mi	km	Destinations	Notes
Youngsville	0.000	0.000	Iberia Street – Milton, Maurice	Southern terminus; roundabout
Broussard	2.266– 2.279	3.647– 3.668	LA 3073 (Ambassador Caffery Parkway) – Broussard, Scott	
Lafayette	4.052	6.521	LA 182 west (West Pinhook Road) / LA 182-1 east – Lafayette, Broussard	Southern end of LA 182 concurrency; western end of LA 182-1
Lafayette–Broussard line	5.021– 5.053	8.081– 8.132	US 90 (Southwest Evangeline Thruway) / LA 182 east – Lafayette, New Iberia	Northern terminus; northern end of LA 182 concurrency
1.000 mi = 1.609 km; 1.000 km = 0.621 mi: Concurrency terminus
