= Louisiana Highway 182 =

Highway in Louisiana

Louisiana Highway 182
- LA 182 in red, LA 182-1 and LA 182-2 in blue

Route information
- Maintained by Louisiana DOTD
- Length: 174.307 mi (280.520 km)
- Existed: 1955 renumbering–present

Major junctions
- Northwest end: LA 29 in Whiteville
- I-49 north of Washington; US 167 in Nuba; US 190 in Opelousas; I-49 / US 167 north of Carencro; I-10 / I-49 / US 167 in Lafayette; Future I-49 / US 90 in Broussard; Future I-49 / US 90 in Morgan City; Future I-49 / US 90 south of Raceland; LA 1 in Raceland
- Southeast end: Future I-49 / US 90 north of Raceland

Location
- Country: United States
- State: Louisiana
- Parishes: St. Landry, Lafayette, St. Martin, Iberia, St. Mary, Assumption, Terrebonne, Lafourche

Highway system
- Louisiana State Highway System; Interstate; US; State; Scenic
← LA 181	→ LA 183

Louisiana Highway 182 (LA 182) is a state highway located in central and southeastern Louisiana. It runs 173.41 miles (279.08 km) in a northwest to southeast direction from LA 29 in Whiteville to U.S. Highway 90 (US 90) north of Raceland.

Along the way, the highway serves the cities of Opelousas, Lafayette, New Iberia, Morgan City, and Houma. LA 182 is generally bannered as a north–south highway north of Lafayette (where it largely parallels US 167) and as an east–west highway from Lafayette to Raceland (where it parallels US 90). Today, most of LA 182 follows the previous alignments of US 90 and US 167 before their re-routing onto newer four-lane alignments. Additionally, the former US 90 alignment between Lafayette and Raceland was once part of the earlier Old Spanish Trail and is still known as such in many places along the route.

In 2015, a rerouting of LA 182 around Broussard via LA 89-1 and US 90, along with a section of the old route through Broussard being retired to local authorities, led to the creation of two auxiliary routes from the remaining state-owned sections of the old alignment. These short highways were known as LA 182-1 and LA 182-2 respectively, and were both located almost entirely within Broussard. Both auxiliary routes were retired in the summer of 2022.

== Route description ==
=== Whiteville to Lafayette ===
From the northwest, LA 182 begins at an intersection with LA 29 in an area of northern St. Landry Parish known as Whiteville. It proceeds in a southeast direction to an intersection with LA 10 in Beggs. Here the two highways turn to the south and begin a concurrency, passing through an interchange with I-49 south of Macland. In Washington, LA 182 and LA 10 intersect LA 103, which heads to Ville Platte to the west. In Nuba, the concurrency with LA 10 ends at an intersection with US 167 as LA 10 turns west to follow US 167. Just to the east, US 167 joins I-49 through Opelousas to Lafayette.

In Opelousas, LA 182 intersects US 190 on its path between Eunice and Krotz Springs. South of Opelousas and an area known as Shuteston, LA 182 turns to the east into Sunset and the adjacent Grand Coteau. Here it intersects LA 93, which connects LA 182 to I-49/US 167 just to the east and proceeds toward Arnaudville. LA 182 crosses over I-49/US 167 with ramps to frontage roads that connect to the LA 93 interchange. Just after exiting Grand Coteau, LA 182 turns to the southeast and crosses into Lafayette Parish.

Soon after crossing the parish line, LA 182 intersects I-49 (still concurrent with US 167) once more and turns to the south through Carencro. LA 182 curves to the southeast, enters the city of Lafayette, and intersects I-10/US 167 between Lake Charles on the west and Baton Rouge on the east.

=== Lafayette to Morgan City ===
From the junction with I-10, LA 182 shares a concurrency with I-10 and US 167 eastward to the intersection with southern terminus of I-49 and the Evangeline Thruway. US 167 leaves I-10, heading north along I-49 towards Alexandria, while LA 182 heads south along the Evangeline Thruway. At Cameron Street, in downtown Lafayette, US 90 comes in from the west and joins LA 182 heading south to exit 115B, where LA 182 splits off, becoming the frontage roads of US 90 for a short distance. Eastbound LA 182, which is the west frontage road, curves southeast under US 90 along the BNSF/Union Pacific Railroad tracks. On the other side of US 90, eastbound LA 182 merges back with westbound LA 182 (the east frontage road), before arriving at an intersection with LA 96 to St. Martinville, then LA continues southeast into St. Martin Parish.

LA 182 passes briefly through the southwest corner of St. Martin Parish, intersecting LA 92-1 in an area known as Cade. It then crosses into Iberia Parish, immediately intersecting LA 88. LA 182 enters New Iberia and separates to follow St. Peter Street eastbound and Main Street westbound throughout the city limits. It intersects a number of state highways, including LA 86, which follows Bayou Teche north to Loreauville, and LA 14, which proceeds west through Delcambre to Abbeville. LA 182 also begins to parallel Bayou Teche out of New Iberia, through Jeanerette, and into St. Mary Parish.

In St. Mary Parish, LA 182 passes through Baldwin and Franklin, cutting across some wide bends in Bayou Teche. In Baldwin, LA 182 intersects LA 83, which heads west to Cypremort Point. Southeast of Franklin at a point known as Calumet, LA 182 briefly joins US 90 across the Wax Lake Outlet bridge. Splitting from US 90, LA 182 proceeds along Bayou Teche and the Lower Atchafalaya River through Patterson, Bayou Vista, and Berwick with no state highway junctions. In Berwick, LA 182 again connects with US 90 but maintains its own parallel bridge crossing over the Lower Atchafalaya River/Berwick Bay into Morgan City.

=== Morgan City to Raceland ===
In Morgan City, LA 182 proceeds briefly along Brashear Avenue then curves south through an interchange with US 90 and an intersection with LA 70 (9th Street). Here the route becomes co-signed as US 90 Business out of Morgan City and into Assumption Parish. After crossing Bayou Boeuf, LA 182 passes briefly through the southern tip of Assumption Parish. The concurrency with US 90 Business ends at an intersection with LA 662 just inside the parish line as US 90 Business heads north on that highway to reconnect with its parent route.

After crossing into Terrebonne Parish, LA 182 intersects LA 20, which heads toward Schriever and Thibodaux. Here, in an area known as Gibson, LA 182 turns to the southeast away from US 90, which bypasses Houma to the north. LA 182 follows a long stretch of Bayou Black into Houma where it turns north across the bayou at an intersection with LA 315. The highway continues through Houma on Barrow Street and crosses Bayou Terrebonne, where it makes a jog onto New Orleans Boulevard via a brief concurrency with LA 24, Houma's main thoroughfare. LA 182 follows New Orleans Boulevard north out of town and crosses into Lafourche Parish.

Just south of Raceland, LA 182 engages in an interchange with US 90 and continues north into town. Reaching Bayou Lafourche, LA 182 turns east briefly onto LA 1 before turning north and crossing the bayou. The highway reaches its end at a final junction with US 90, which continues northeast toward New Orleans.

== History ==
The original route of LA 182 as designated in the 1955 Louisiana Highway renumbering included only the northernmost section from LA 29 in Whiteville to LA 10 in Beggs. It was subsequently extended southeast over former sections of US 167 and US 90 bypassed by newer, four-lane alignments (built under the temporary designation of LA 3052). The upgraded US 167 was later absorbed into the southernmost part of I-49.

The first extension of LA 182 occurred about 1962 when US 167 was shifted onto a new four-lane alignment between Opelousas and Sunset. Around 1965, this alignment was extended south from Sunset to Lafayette (as US 167) and from Lafayette to Broussard (as US 90). At this time, a section of US 90 west of Morgan City was bypassed. LA 182 now continued south from Sunset along former US 167 to Lafayette, along former US 90 to Broussard, and was co-signed with US 90 to Calumet. Here, LA 182 split from US 90 to follow the two bends of Bayou Teche that had been bypassed between Calumet and Berwick. The intervening section of US 90 was gradually re-routed over the next two decades onto its current alignment as follows:

- From Broussard to LA 88 northwest of New Iberia about 1967
- From LA 88 to LA 14 in New Iberia about 1969
- From LA 14 to LA 85 near Jeanerette about 1971
- From LA 85 to LA 316 east of Jeanerette by 1976
- From LA 316 to LA 83 in Baldwin by 1979
- From LA 83 to LA 182 at Calumet about 1981

Meanwhile, the US 90 bypass of Raceland was opened in 1978 with the old alignment becoming LA 3198 and LA 3199. LA 182 replaced these routes upon its final extension in 1999 with the completion of the US 90 freeway between Morgan City and Raceland. In 2015, LA 182 was re-routed along LA 89-1 and US 90, bypassing Broussard, after the section of Main Street between South Bernard Road and South De Porres Street was retired and handed over to the city. The remaining state-maintained sections of the original became auxiliary routes, LA 182-1 and LA 182-2 respectively.

On July 21, 2022, LA 182 was re-routed after the entire route through Lafayette was retired from the state highway system, being handed over to the city of Lafayette, along with US 90 Business (which was also eliminated as an active designation), and US 167. As a result, US 167 was re-routed to be concurrent with I-10 heading west, then south along LA 3184 and LA 3025 between Johnson Street at LA 3025 and the I-10 interchange with I-49. LA 182 was subsequently re-routed to a short wrong-way concurrency along I-10 and US 167 to the I-49 interchange and took over the old route of US 167 along the Evangeline Thruway, running concurrent with US 90 along the Thruway to exit 115. Auxiliary routes LA 182-1 and LA 182-2 were decommissioned on July 10, 2022 and August 10, 2022 respectively, following a transfer of ownership to the cities of Broussard and Lafayette.

== Major intersections ==
Parish	Location	mi	km	Destinations	Notes
St. Landry	Whiteville	0.000	0.000	LA 29 – Bunkie, Ville Platte	Northwestern terminus
St. Landry	Beggs	12.391	19.941	LA 10 east – Lebeau	North end of LA 10 concurrency
St. Landry	Macland	13.860	22.306	LA 745 (Thistlethwaite Boy Scout Camp Road)	Northern terminus of LA 745
St. Landry		15.057	24.232	I-49 – Opelousas, Alexandria	Exit 27 on I-49
St. Landry		16.778	27.002	LA 745	Southern terminus of LA 745
St. Landry	Washington	17.024	27.397	LA 103 (West DeJean Street, St. Landry Veterans Memorial Highway) – Grand Prairie, Port Barre	
St. Landry	Nuba	19.320	31.093	US 167 / LA 10 west – Lafayette, Ville Platte	South end of LA 10 concurrency
St. Landry	Opelousas	23.203	37.342	US 190 (Landry Street, Vine Street) – Baton Rouge, Eunice	
St. Landry	Opelousas	24.121	38.819	LA 31 (Creswell Lane) – Leonville, Arnaudville	Northern terminus of LA 31
St. Landry		27.024	43.491	LA 3233 (Harry Guilbeau Road) to I-49 – Opelousas, Lafayette	Western terminus of LA 3233
St. Landry		29.324	47.192	LA 358 – Lewisburg	Eastern terminus of LA 358
St. Landry	Shuteston	30.674	49.365	LA 178 – Church Point, Lewisburg	
St. Landry		31.517	50.722	LA 754	Eastern terminus of LA 754
St. Landry	Sunset	32.810	52.803	LA 93 south (Sunset Strip)	North end of LA 93 concurrency
St. Landry	Sunset	32.977	53.071	LA 178 (Pershing Highway)	Eastern terminus of LA 178
St. Landry	Sunset	33.397	53.747	LA 93 east to I-49 – Arnaudville, Opelousas, Lafayette	South end of LA 93 concurrency; Exit 11 on I-49
St. Landry	Sunset	33.783	54.368	I-49 / US 167 – Opelousas, Lafayette	Indirect access to I-49/US 167 via frontage roads to Exit 11
St. Landry	Sunset–Grand Coteau line	34.826	56.047	LA 760-2 (Bellemin Street) – Grand Coteau	Southern terminus of LA 760-2
Lafayette		37.802	60.836	I-49 / US 167 – Lafayette, Opelousas	Exit 7 on I-49
Lafayette	Carencro	40.718	65.529	LA 726 (Veterans Drive) to I-49 – Lafayette, Opelousas	Western terminus of LA 726
Lafayette	Carencro	42.476	68.358	LA 98 (Gloria Switch Road) to I-49 – Lafayette, Opelousas	
Lafayette	Lafayette	45.641	73.452	LA 723 west (Renaud Drive)	Eastern terminus of LA 723
Lafayette	Lafayette	45.873	73.825	I-10 west (US 167 south) – Lake Charles	North end of I-10/US 167 concurrency; exit 101 on I-10
Lafayette	Lafayette	47.240	76.025	I-10 east – Baton Rouge I-49 north / US 167 north – Alexandria	South end of I-10/US 167 concurrency; current southern terminus and exits 1A-B on I-49
Lafayette	Lafayette	47.613	76.626	US 90 west (Cameron Street) – Crowley-Rayne, New Iberia	North end of US 90 concurrency
Lafayette	Lafayette	49.469	79.613	LA 176 east (Jefferson Boulevard)	Western terminus of LA 176
Lafayette	Lafayette	49.781	80.115	LA 94 east (Louisiana Avenue) – Breaux Bridge	Western terminus of LA 94
Lafayette	Lafayette	50.745	81.666	Bridge over Vermilion River	
Lafayette	Lafayette	51.906	83.535	LA 728-3 north (Hugh Wallis Road) to LA 729	Northern terminus of LA 728-3
Lafayette	Lafayette–Broussard line	54.372	87.503	LA 89-1 south – Youngsville	Northern terminus of LA 89-1
Lafayette	Broussard	57.215	92.079	St. Nazaire Road / Albertson Parkway	Interchange; eastbound exit, northbound entrance; US 90 exit 115A
Lafayette	Broussard	57.553	92.623	US 90 east – New Iberia	Interchange; eastern end of US 90 concurrency; US 90 exit 115B;
Lafayette	Broussard	58.274	93.783	LA 96 (Terrace Highway) – St. Martinville	Western terminus of LA 96
St. Martin	Cade	61.848	99.535	LA 92-1 (Smede Highway) – Youngsville, St. Martinville	
Iberia	Burke	64.233	103.373	LA 88 (Coteau Road) – Youngsville	Eastern terminus of LA 88
Iberia	Segura	66.949	107.744	LA 674 (Bypass Highway)	Western terminus of LA 674
Iberia	New Iberia	68.327	109.962	LA 677 (North Landry Drive)	Western terminus of LA 677
Iberia	New Iberia	69.077	111.169	LA 31 (Chestnut Street) – St. Martinville	Southern terminus of LA 31
Iberia	New Iberia	69.241	111.433	LA 675 (South Hopkins Street) – Jefferson Island	Eastern terminus of LA 675
Iberia	New Iberia	69.500	111.849	LA 3156 (Jefferson Street)	Southwestern terminus of LA 3156
Iberia	New Iberia	69.836	112.390	LA 86 north (Julia Street) – Loreauville	Southern terminus of LA 86
Iberia	New Iberia	69.973	112.611	LA 14 west (Center Street) – Abbeville	Eastern terminus of LA 14
Iberia	New Iberia	70.772	113.896	LA 87 Spur (North Lewis Avenue)	Southwestern terminus of LA 87 Spur
Iberia		72.409	116.531	LA 3195	Southern terminus of LA 3195
Iberia	Olivier	74.122	119.288	LA 320 (Belle Place Olivier Road) – Morbihan, Loreauville	Southern terminus of LA 320
Iberia	Jeanerette	79.650	128.184	LA 3182 (Bayside Street)	Southwestern terminus of LA 3182
Iberia	Jeanerette	79.807	128.437	LA 85 (Hubertville Road)	Eastern terminus of LA 85
Iberia	Jeanerette	81.178	130.643	LA 671 north (Lewis Street)	West end of LA 671 concurrency
Iberia	Jeanerette	81.286	130.817	LA 671 south (Canal Street)	East end of LA 671 concurrecy
St. Mary	Sorrel	84.344	135.739	LA 318 – Cypremort	Northern terminus of LA 318
St. Mary	Adeline	86.498	139.205	LA 670	Southern terminus of LA 670
St. Mary	Baldwin	89.935	144.736	LA 83 – Cypremort	Eastern terminus of LA 83
St. Mary	Baldwin	90.191	145.148	LA 326 (Charenton Road) – Charenton	Southern terminus of LA 326
St. Mary	Franklin	93.455	150.401	LA 3211 (Northwest Boulevard)	Northeastern terminus of LA 3211
St. Mary	Franklin	94.528	152.128	LA 322 (Sterling Road)	Western terminus of LA 322
St. Mary	Franklin	95.232	153.261	LA 3069 (Willow Street)	Western terminus of LA 3069
St. Mary	Garden City	98.427	158.403	LA 3215	Northern terminus of LA 3215
St. Mary	Centerville	100.429	161.625	LA 317	Northern terminus of LA 317
St. Mary		105.854	170.355	US 90 west – New Iberia	West end of US 90 concurrency
St. Mary	Calumet	106.613	171.577	Bridge over Wax Lake Outlet	
St. Mary	Calumet	107.295	172.675	US 90 east – Morgan City	East end of US 90 concurrency
St. Mary	Berwick	120.540	193.990	US 90 – Morgan City, New Iberia	Interchange; US 90 exit 173
St. Mary	Berwick–Morgan City line	121.176	195.014	Bridge over Lower Atchafalaya River / Berwick Bay	
St. Mary	Morgan City	121.619	195.727	Federal Avenue to US 90	
St. Mary	Morgan City	122.102	196.504	US 90 – Houma, New Iberia US 90 Bus. begins LA 70 east (9th Street) – Donaldsonville, Pierre Part	Interchange; western terminus of US 90 Business and LA 70; west end of US 90 Business concurrency; exit 175 on US 90
Assumption	Boeuf	129.639	208.634	US 90 Bus. / LA 662 east – Labadieville	East end of US 90 Business concurrency; western terminus of LA 662
Terrebonne	Zacarter	132.686	213.537	LA 662 west to US 90 – Morgan City, Houma	Eastern terminus of LA 662
Terrebonne	Gibson	135.654	218.314	LA 20 east – Thibodaux, Schriever	Western terminus of LA 20
Terrebonne	Houma	156.824	252.384	LA 315 south – Theriot LA 3197 east (Bayou Black Drive)	Northern terminus of LA 315; southwestern terminus of LA 3197
Terrebonne	Houma	157.250	253.069	LA 311 / LA 312 (Little Bayou Black Drive); LA 3197 (Bayou Black Drive)	Southern terminus of LA 311 and LA 312; northeastern terminus of LA 3197
Terrebonne	Houma	158.015	254.300	LA 3040 (Honduras Street, Bond Street)	
Terrebonne	Houma	158.537	255.141	LA 24 west (Main Street, Park Avenue) – Thibodaux, Schriever	West end of LA 24 concurrency
Terrebonne	Houma	158.742	255.470	LA 24 east (Main Street, Park Avenue) – Larose	East end of LA 24 concurrency
Terrebonne		161.098	259.262	LA 660 (Coteau Road)	
Lafourche	Savoie	162.483	261.491	LA 316 (Bayou Blue Road) – Gray, Bourg	
Lafourche		163.347	262.882	LA 3087	Northern terminus of LA 3087
Lafourche		166.662	268.216	US 90 – New Orleans, Morgan City	Exit 210 on US 90
Lafourche		168.073	270.487	LA 653	Northern terminus of LA 653
Lafourche	Raceland	168.752	271.580	LA 652 (Buford Street)	Northern terminus of LA 652
Lafourche	Raceland	170.162	273.849	LA 1 north – Thibodaux	West end of LA 1 concurrency
Lafourche	Raceland	170.696	274.709	LA 1 south – Grand Isle	East end of LA 1 concurrency
Lafourche	Raceland	170.769	274.826	LA 308 – Thibodaux, Lockport	
Lafourche	Raceland	173.912	279.884	LA 307 – Bayou Boeuf	Southern terminus of LA 307
Lafourche		174.307	280.520	US 90 – New Orleans, Morgan City	Southeastern terminus
1.000 mi = 1.609 km; 1.000 km = 0.621 mi: Concurrency terminus; Incomplete access

== Auxiliary routes ==
=== Louisiana Highway 182-1 ===
Louisiana Highway 182-1
- Location: Lafayette–Broussard
- Length: 1.029 mi (1.656 km)
- Existed: 2015–2022

Louisiana Highway 182-1 (LA 182-1) ran 1.029 miles (1.656 km) in an east-west direction from the junction of LA 182 and LA 89-1 to South Bernard Road west of downtown Broussard. It was part of LA 182 until a portion of the route in Broussard was transferred to local control in 2015, creating a gap in state maintenance. The section between South Deporres Street and St. Etienne Road became LA 182-2. LA 182 proper was rerouted along LA 89-1 and US 90 between the western terminus of LA 182-1 and the eastern terminus of LA 182-2.

LA 182-1 began at an intersection with West Pinhook Road and Southpark Road/Youngsville Highway (LA 89-1). LA 182 proper came in from the southeast on West Pinhook Road, before turning northeast onto Southpark Road to run concurrently with LA 89-1 to US 90. From this point, LA 182-1 continued southeast along West Pinhook Road for less than a mile, before ending at a traffic light regulated four-way intersection with South Bernard Road. West Pinhook Road, no longer a state highway from this point forward, continues east as West Main Street into downtown Broussard. LA 182-1 was decommissioned on July 18, 2022 after ownership of Pinhook Road was transferred from the LADOTD to the cities of Lafayette and Broussard.

Major intersections
The entire highway was in Lafayette Parish.

Location	mi	km	Destinations	Notes
Lafayette	0.000	0.000	LA 89-1 / LA 182 to US 90 – Lafayette, Morgan City	Western terminus
Broussard	1.029	1.656	South Bernard Road / West Main Street	Eastern terminus
1.000 mi = 1.609 km; 1.000 km = 0.621 mi

=== Louisiana Highway 182-2 ===
Louisiana Highway 182-2
- Location: Broussard
- Length: 1.342 mi (2.160 km)
- Existed: 2015–2022

Louisiana Highway 182-2 (LA 182-2) ran 1.342 miles (2.160 km) in a north-south direction from the junction of South De Porres Street in Broussard to a junction with St. Etienne Road and LA 182 eastbound on the west side of the US 90 freeway. It was part of LA 182 until a portion of the route in Broussard was transferred to local control in 2015, creating a gap in state maintenance. The section between LA 89-1 and South Bernard Road became LA 182-2. The main route of LA 182 was modified to run concurrently with LA 89-1 and US 90 between the western terminus of LA 182-1 and the eastern terminus of LA 182-2.

LA 182-2 began at the intersection of East Main Street and South De Porres Street in downtown Broussard. The highway continued east along Main Street, crossing the BNSF/Union Pacific Railroad tracks on the east side of town, coming to a wye intersection with East 2nd Street (former LA 731). Past 2nd Street, LA 182-2 curved south, paralleling US 90 to the east, before arriving at a junction with Albertson Parkway. The route was effectively cut in half by Albertson Parkway with the two sections being in-traversable from one another. From Alberston Parkway, the southern portion of LA 182-2 continued straight south to an entrance/exit ramp controlled junction with St. Etienne Road and the west frontage road of US 90, which serves as the eastbound lanes of LA 182. Southeast of this intersection, northbound LA 182 can be reached via a turnaround lane underneath the US 90 railroad overpass. LA 182-2 could not be directly accessed by westbound LA 182 traffic. As the route was not connected directly with LA 182 proper, and LA 731 had been retired in 2021, LA 182-2 was entirely cut off from the rest of the state highway system. On August 10, 2022, LA 182-2 was retired after ownership of the route was transferred to the city of Broussard.

Major intersections
The entire highway was in Broussard, Lafayette Parish.

mi	km	Destinations	Notes
0.000	0.000	South De Porres Street / East Main Street	Northern terminus
0.189	0.304	East 2nd Street	Former LA 731 west
0.857	1.379	Albertson Parkway	Concrete median on Albertson Parkway prevents through traffic on LA 182-2
1.342	2.160	St Etienne Road to LA 182 east – New Iberia, St. Martinville	Southern terminus; access to eastbound LA 182 only; westbound access via LA 182 eastbound
1.000 mi = 1.609 km; 1.000 km = 0.621 mi: Incomplete access
