= Louisiana Highway 88 =

State highway in Louisiana, US

Louisiana Highway 88
- Coteau Road
- Route of LA 88 highlighted in red

Route information
- Maintained by Louisiana DOTD
- Length: 5.388 mi (8.671 km)
- Existed: 1955 renumbering–present

Major junctions
- West end: LA 89 at Lozes
- Future I-49 / US 90 northwest of New Iberia
- East end: LA 182 at Burke

Location
- Country: United States
- State: Louisiana
- Parishes: Iberia

Highway system
- Louisiana State Highway System; Interstate; US; State; Scenic
← LA 87	→ LA 89

Louisiana Highway 88 (LA 88) is a state highway located in Iberia Parish, Louisiana. It runs 5.39 miles (8.67 km) in an east–west direction from LA 89 at Lozes to LA 182 at Burke.

The route connects U.S. Highway 90 (US 90) and LA 182, its de facto business route, between Lafayette and New Iberia. LA 88 also connects US 90 to Delcambre, a town east of Abbeville, via LA 89. It runs through a mixture of older rural and newer suburban development.

== Route description ==
From the west, LA 88 begins at an intersection with LA 89 located at a point in northwestern Iberia Parish known as Lozes. LA 89, heading north from Delcambre, makes a sharp turn from Coteau Road west onto Youngsville Road to head toward the small city of Youngsville. LA 88 proceeds straight ahead on Coteau Road for 0.6 miles (0.97 km) then curves to the east. After 1.3 miles (2.1 km), LA 88 passes through an interchange with US 90, the future route of I-49, which connects to Lafayette on the northwest and Morgan City on the southeast.

East of US 90, LA 88 makes a jog to the south and back to the northeast. 2.2 miles (3.5 km) later, the route crosses the BNSF/Union Pacific Railroad line. It ends immediately afterward at an intersection with LA 182 (West Old Spanish Trail) at a point known as Burke, 2.8 miles (4.5 km) northwest of New Iberia. LA 182 parallels the route of US 90 to Lafayette and Morgan City.

The route is classified by the Louisiana Department of Transportation and Development (La DOTD) as an urban collector from the western terminus to Parish Road 509 and a rural major collector to the eastern terminus. The entire route has an average daily traffic volume of 5,800 vehicles, and the posted speed limit is 55 mph (90 km/h). LA 88 is an undivided two-lane highway for the majority of its route, widening briefly to a divided four-lane highway through the interchange with US 90.

== History ==
In the original Louisiana Highway system in use between 1921 and 1955, the modern LA 88 made up the northern portion of State Route 448. Route 448 followed the present route of LA 89 from Delcambre north to Lozes, then LA 88 from there to Burke.

La 88—From a junction with La 89 at or near Lozes to a junction with La-US 90 at or near Burke.

— 1955 legislative route description

LA 88 was created with the 1955 Louisiana Highway renumbering, and its route has remained the same to the present day. However, the eastern terminus in Burke was originally a junction with US 90. After the relocation of US 90 through the area around 1969, the former alignment became LA 182, which now serves as the eastern terminus of LA 88.

== Future ==
La DOTD is currently involved in a program that aims to transfer about 5,000 miles (8,000 km) of state-owned roadways to local governments over the next several years. Under this plan of "right-sizing" the state highway system, the entire route of LA 88 is proposed for deletion as it does not meet a significant interurban travel function.

== Major intersections ==
The entire highway is in Iberia Parish.

Location	mi	km	Destinations	Notes
Lozes	0.000	0.000	LA 89 (Youngsville Road, Coteau Road) – Youngsville, Delcambre	Western terminus
	1.904– 2.066	3.064– 3.325	US 90 – Lafayette, Morgan City	Interchange; exit 122 on US 90
Burke	5.388	8.671	LA 182 (West Old Spanish Trail) – New Iberia, Lafayette	Eastern terminus
1.000 mi = 1.609 km; 1.000 km = 0.621 mi
