= Charon, Louisiana =

- Unincorporated community
- Location of Erath in Louisiana
- Coordinates: 30°01′18″N 92°01′23″W
- Country: United States
- State: Louisiana
- Parish: Vermilion
- Elevation: 16 ft (4.9 m)
- Time zone: UTC-6 (CST)
  - Summer (DST): UTC-5 (CDT)
- Area code: 337

Charon (also spelled "Charogne") is an unincorporated community in Vermilion Parish, Louisiana, United States. It is part of the Abbeville Micropolitan Statistical Area.

Charon is located at 30°01′18″N 92°01′23″W (30.021593, -92.023178) at the intersection of Louisiana highways 338 and 339, north of the town of Erath, and consists of the southern part of the LeBlanc Community.
