= Bayou Boeuf Elementary School =

- U.S. National Register of Historic Places
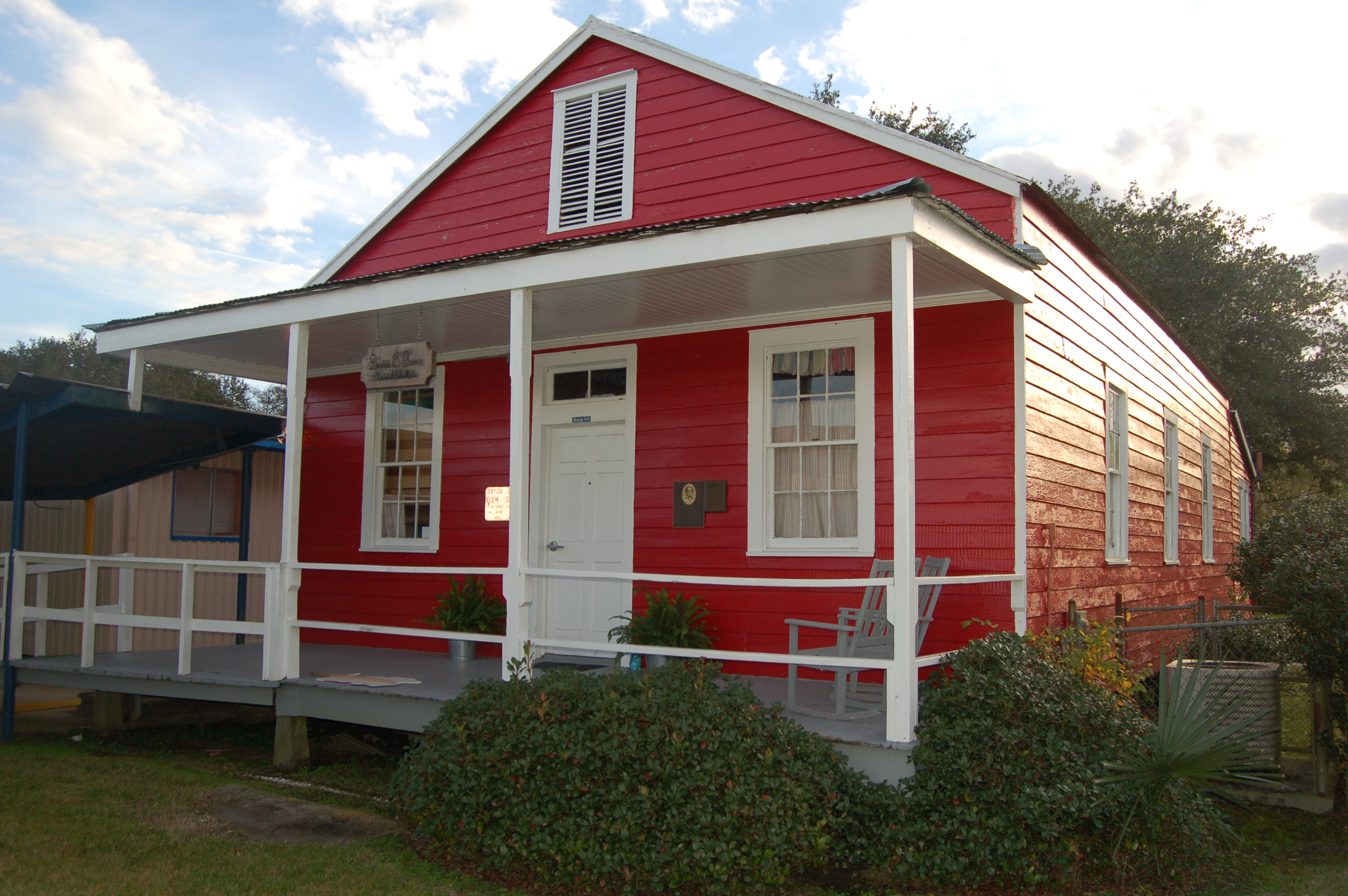

- Location within Louisiana Location within the United States
- Location: 4138 LA 307
- Nearest city: Thibodaux, Louisiana
- Coordinates: 29°52′05″N 90°35′38″W
- Area: less than one acre
- Built: 1904
- NRHP reference No.: 04000082
- Added to NRHP: February 25, 2004

Bayou Boeuf Elementary School (BBES) is an elementary school in unincorporated Lafourche Parish, Louisiana, east of the Kraemer (Bayou Boeuf) census-designated place. It serves residents of the Ward 6 Area of the parish, including Bayou Boeuf and Choctaw. It is a part of Lafourche Parish Public Schools.

Its original 1904 school building, the "Little Red Schoolhouse," was listed on the National Register of Historic Places on February 25, 2004.

== History ==
It was established between 1904 and 1905. It occupied a 7-acre (2.8 ha) plot.

In 1983 J. Kelly Nix, the Louisiana Superintendent of Education, declared the original Bayou Boeuf Elementary school building, also known as the "Little Red Schoolhouse", as the oldest continuously used one-room schoolhouse in Louisiana. As of 2016 kindergarten students have classes held in that building. On March 27, 2004, a 100-year anniversary party was scheduled to be held at the schoolhouse. This building was listed on the National Register of Historic Places on February 25, 2004.

Students at Bayou Boeuf matriculate to Sixth Ward Middle School and Thibodaux High School.

== See also ==
- National Register of Historic Places listings in Lafourche Parish, Louisiana
