= Bayou Gauche, Louisiana =

Bayou Gauche
- Census-designated place
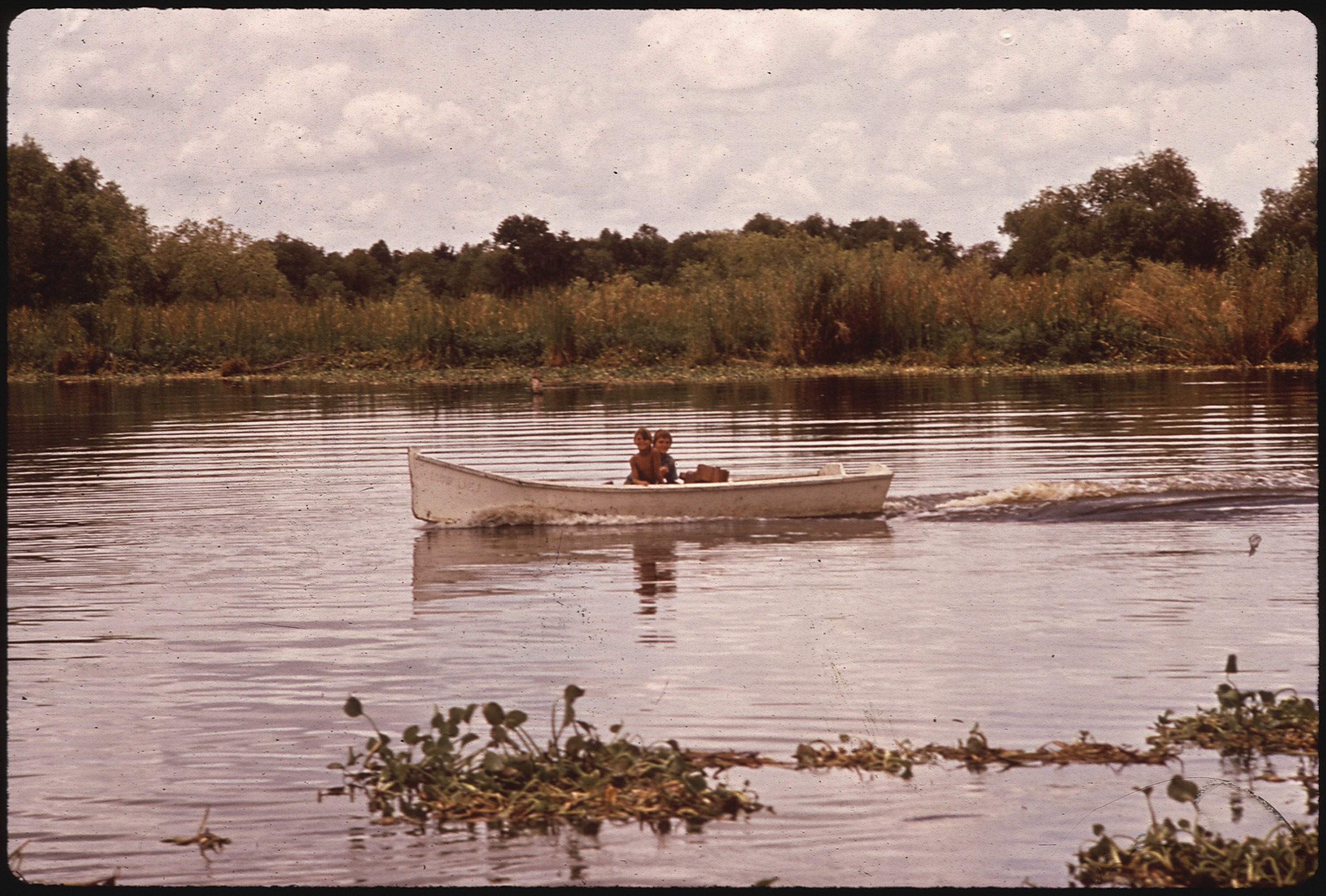
- Fishing in the Bayou Gauche wetlands

- Location of Bayou Gauche in Louisiana
- Coordinates: 29°49′31″N 90°26′05″W
- Country: United States
- State: Louisiana
- Parish: St. Charles

Area
  - Total: 15.78 sq mi (40.86 km^{2})
  - Land: 12.85 sq mi (33.29 km^{2})
  - Water: 2.92 sq mi (7.57 km^{2})
- Elevation: 3 ft (0.91 m)

Population (2020)
  - Total: 2,161
  - Density: 168.1/sq mi (64.92/km^{2})
- Time zone: UTC-6 (CST)
  - Summer (DST): UTC-5 (CDT)
- Area code: 985
- FIPS code: 22-05315

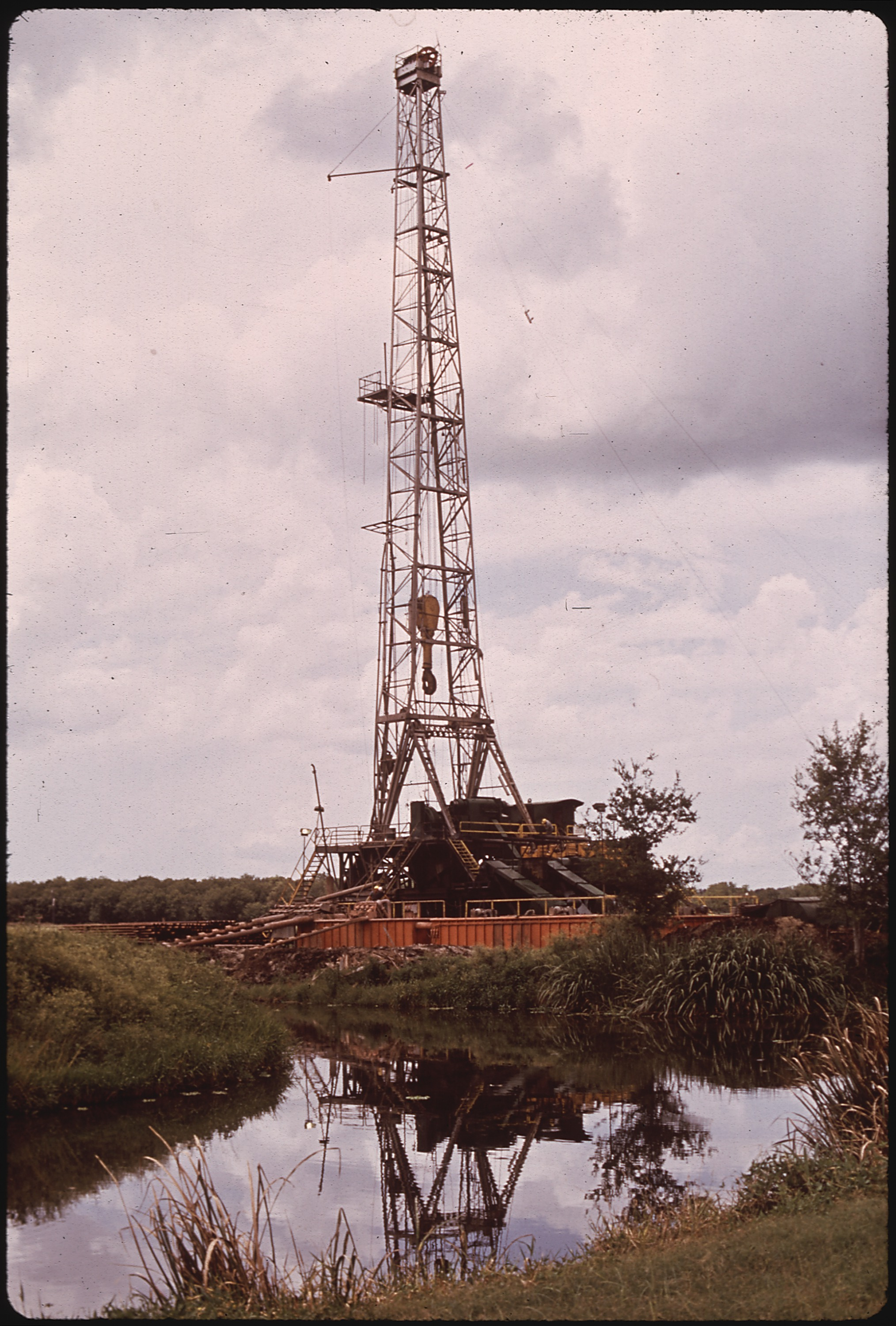
Oil well rig in wetlands near Bayou Gauche.

Bayou Gauche is a census-designated place and fishing village, with an adjacent natural bayou and wetlands. It is located in St. Charles Parish, Louisiana, United States. As of 2020, its population was 2,161.

== Geography ==
Bayou Gauche is part of the Greater New Orleans region. It is located at 29°49′31″N 90°26′5″W (29.825162, -90.434727).

According to the United States Census Bureau, the designated CDP has a total area of 20.2 square miles (52 km^{2}), of which 17.6 square miles (46 km^{2}) is land and 2.6 square miles (6.7 km^{2}) (12.93%) is water.

== Demographics ==
Historical population
Census	Pop.	Note	%±
2000	1,770		—
2010	2,071		17.0%
2020	2,161		4.3%
U.S. Decennial Census

Bayou Gauche was first listed as a census designated place in the 2000 U.S. census. In 2020, it had a population of 2,161.

== Economy ==
The fishing and shellfish industries have been important in the local economy. Some residences for people in those fields, and their families, are stilt houses in the bayou and wetlands.

Oil wells for petroleum production are also present.

== Education ==
St. Charles Parish Public School System operates public schools:

- R. J. Vial Elementary School (grades 3-5) in Paradis - Opened in 1975
- J. B. Martin Middle School (grades 6-8) in Paradis
