= Whiteville, Louisiana =

Whiteville
- Unincorporated community
- Location within the state of Louisiana
- Coordinates: 30°47′18″N 92°8′51″W
- Country: United States
- State: Louisiana
- Parish: St. Landry
- Time zone: UTC-6 (Central (CST))
  - Summer (DST): UTC-5 (CDT)
- GNIS feature ID: 1628499

Whiteville is an unincorporated community in St. Landry Parish, Louisiana, United States. It is located approximately 20 miles north of Opelousas along Louisiana Highway 29.

The community is part of the Opelousas–Eunice Micropolitan Statistical Area.
