= Sorrel, Louisiana =

- Census-designated place
- Location of Sorrel in Louisiana
- Coordinates: 29°53′30″N 91°37′7″W
- Country: United States
- State: Louisiana
- Parish: St. Mary

Area
  - Total: 2.18 sq mi (5.64 km^{2})
  - Land: 2.12 sq mi (5.48 km^{2})
  - Water: 0.062 sq mi (0.16 km^{2})
- Elevation: 18 ft (5.5 m)

Population (2020)
  - Total: 711
  - Density: 336.0/sq mi (129.72/km^{2})
- Time zone: UTC-6 (CST)
  - Summer (DST): UTC-5 (CDT)
- Area code: 337
- FIPS code: 22-71190

Sorrel is a census-designated place (CDP) in St. Mary Parish, Louisiana, United States. It is located in Iberia Parish, Louisiana and St. Mary Parish, Louisiana. As of the 2020 census, Sorrel had a population of 711. It is part of the Morgan City Micropolitan Statistical Area.

== Geography ==
Sorrel is located at 29°53′30″N 91°37′7″W (29.89174, -91.61885), 3 miles (5 km) east of Jeanerette and 6 miles (10 km) northwest of Baldwin. It is situated at the junction of Louisiana Highway 182 and Louisiana Highway 318. According to the United States Census Bureau, the CDP has a total area of 2.2 square miles (5.6 km^{2}), of which 2.1 square miles (5.5 km^{2}) is land and 0.08 square miles (0.2 km^{2}), or 2.76%, is water.

== Demographics ==
Historical population
Census	Pop.	Note	%±
2010	766		—
2020	711		−7.2%
U.S. Decennial Census

Sorrel first appeared as a census designated place in the 2010 U.S. census. '

=== Racial and ethnic composition ===
Sorrel CDP, Louisiana – Racial and ethnic composition Note: the US Census treats Hispanic/Latino as an ethnic category. This table excludes Latinos from the racial categories and assigns them to a separate category. Hispanics/Latinos may be of any race.
Race / Ethnicity (NH = Non-Hispanic)	Pop 2010	Pop 2020	% 2010	% 2020
White alone (NH)	335	333	43.73%	46.84%
Black or African American alone (NH)	402	319	52.48%	44.87%
Native American or Alaska Native alone (NH)	2	2	0.26%	0.28%
Asian alone (NH)	1	1	0.13%	0.14%
Native Hawaiian or Pacific Islander alone (NH)	1	0	0.13%	0.00%
Other race alone (NH)	1	1	0.13%	0.14%
Mixed race or Multiracial (NH)	10	28	1.31%	3.94%
Hispanic or Latino (any race)	14	27	1.83%	3.80%
Total	766	711	100.00%	100.00%

As of 2024, the population is at 514 with a median age of 48.1 years. The average household income is at 71, 971, while the poverty rate is at 19.37%.
