= Cypremort Point State Park =

State park in Louisiana, United States

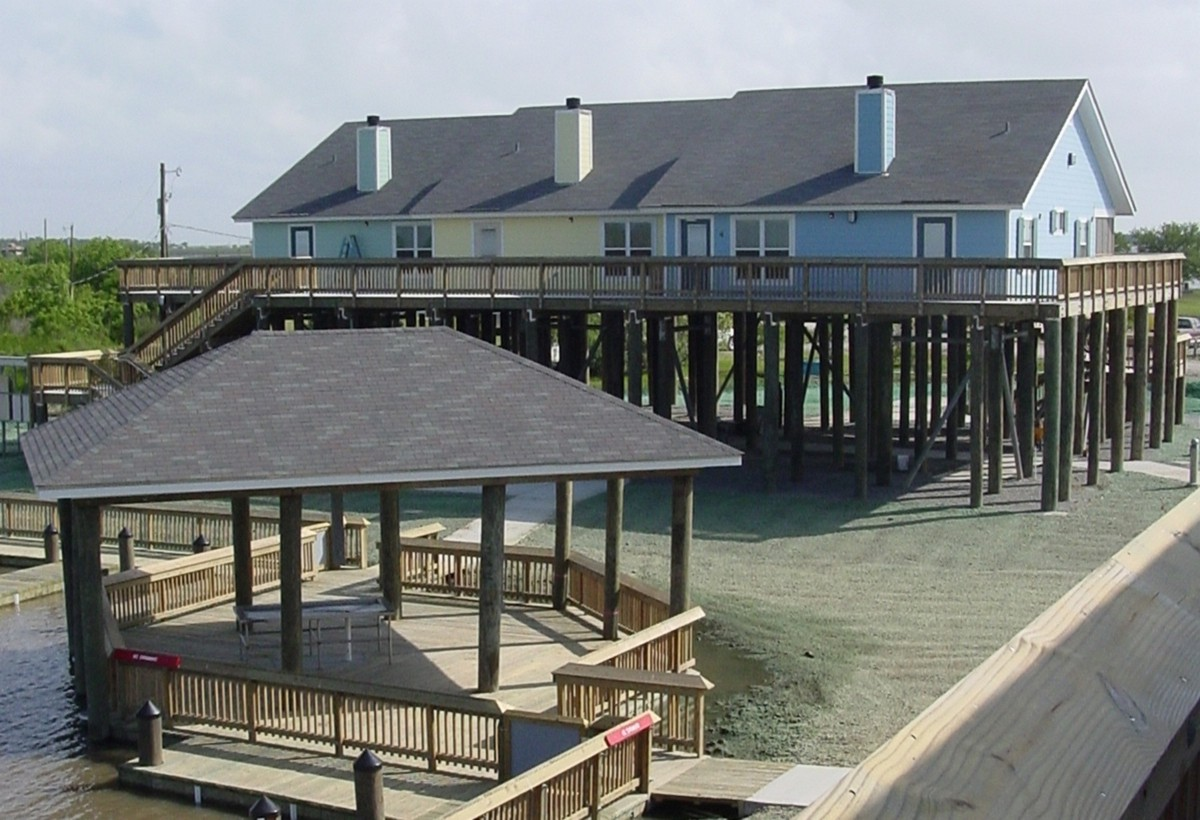
- Cabins on the beach at the park

- Location within Louisiana
- Location: St. Mary Parish, Louisiana, United States of America
- Coordinates: 29.73722°N 91.85333°W
- Area: 185 acres (0.75 km^{2}; 0.289 sq mi)
- Established: November 20, 2004
- Visitors: 37,748 (in 2022)
- Governing body: Louisiana Office of State Parks
- Website: Official website

Cypremort Point State Park is a public recreation area located on Vermilion Bay, Louisiana near the end of La. Hwy. 319. It is named for nearby Cypremort Point. Cypremort means "dead cypress" in French. The 185-acre (0.75 km^{2}) park, set against a backdrop of coastal marsh, contains a half-mile stretch of man-made beach which contains picnic sites, a fishing pavilion and sailboat launch. Also, there are 6 cabins on the park grounds which may be reserved by guests. Chitimacha tradition says that one of 4 markers for their tribal land was a great cypress, at present-day Cypremort Point State Park. Cypremort Point is one of the few spots on the Louisiana Gulf coastline which may be accessed by road.

== Water Activities ==
The park has a 100-foot (30 m) fishing pier. Crabbing, water skiing, windsurfing and sailing are common activities.

== Fauna ==
A visitor may see nutria, muskrat, alligator, or a number of bird species. Deer, black bear, rabbits, possum, and red fox also make their home in the area.

== Gallery ==
Cypremort Point State Park
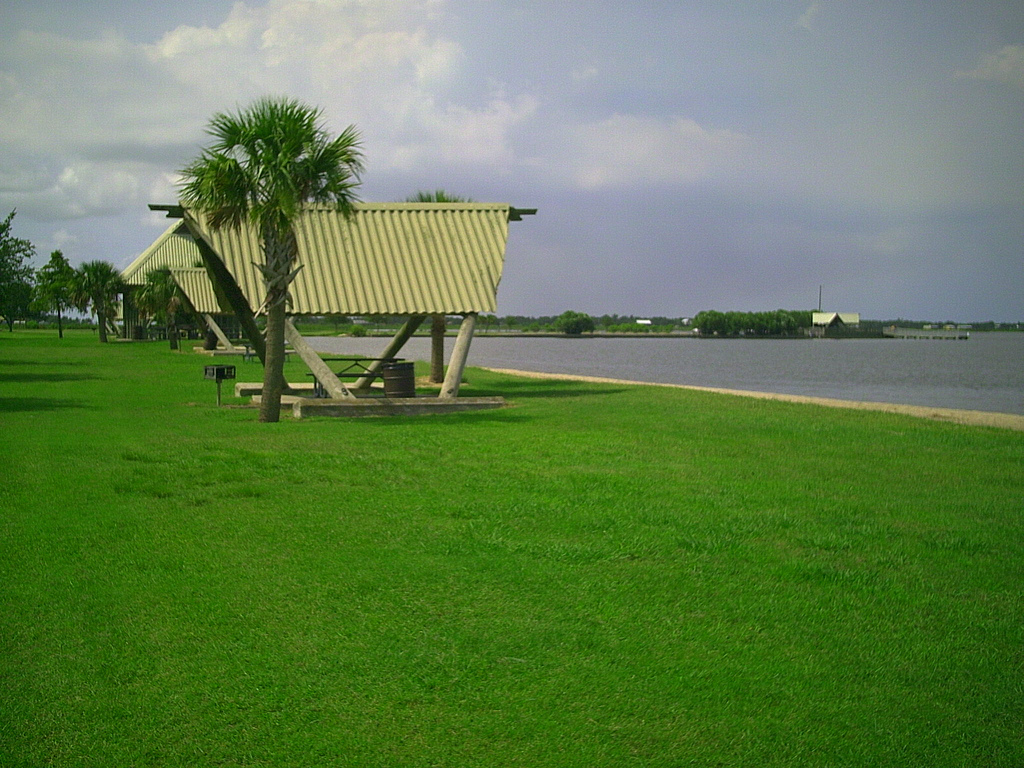
Located near the coast of Vermilion Bay are pavilions used for recreation.
