= Milton, Louisiana =

- Census-designated place
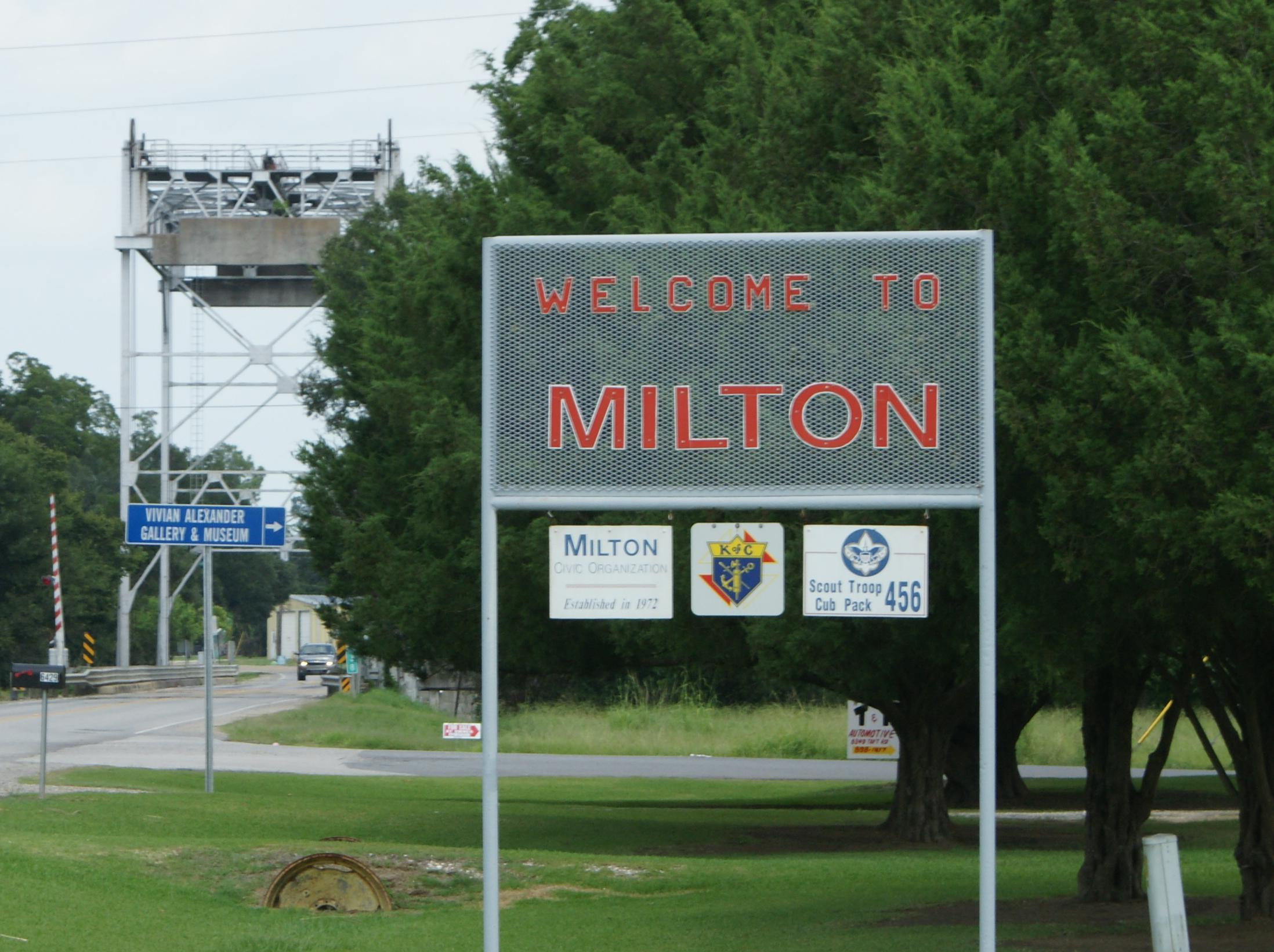
- Milton Welcome Sign

- Location in Louisiana Location in the United States
- Coordinates: 30°06′14″N 92°04′35″W
- Country: United States
- State: Louisiana
- Parish: Lafayette

Area
  - Total: 4.68 sq mi (12.12 km^{2})
  - Land: 4.64 sq mi (12.03 km^{2})
  - Water: 0.031 sq mi (0.08 km^{2})
- Elevation: 20 ft (6.1 m)

Population (2020)
  - Total: 2,590
  - Density: 557.4/sq mi (215.22/km^{2})
- Time zone: UTC-6 (CST)
  - Summer (DST): UTC-5 (CDT)
- Area code: 337
- FIPS code: 22-50815

Milton /ˈmɪltən/ is an unincorporated community and census-designated place in Lafayette Parish, Louisiana, United States. As of the 2020 census, Milton had a population of 2,590. Milton is part of the Lafayette metropolitan statistical area.

== History ==
It is unknown when the area of Milton was first settled. Old land claims show that much of the community is on land once owned by Bernard, son of Ashnoya, a leader of the Atakapa people. The area served as a river crossing and a trade center for the farms and cattle ranches that lined both sides of the Vermilion River.

The earliest settlers were Acadian families. Early landowners in the area included Francois Broussard, son of Joseph Broussard dit Beausoleil; Jean Bernard; Pierre Vincent; Michel Meaux; Jean-Baptiste Trahan; and Joseph Boudreaux. Jean-Jacques Denais operated a ferry at the townsite in the early 19th century. Désiré Broussard and Jean-Baptiste Montet settled there by 1823. Anselm Thibodeaux, who settled on land on the east bank of the river, cultivated it for at least 20 years prior to the Louisiana Purchase in 1803. Anselm's Coulee, named for him, runs through the area.

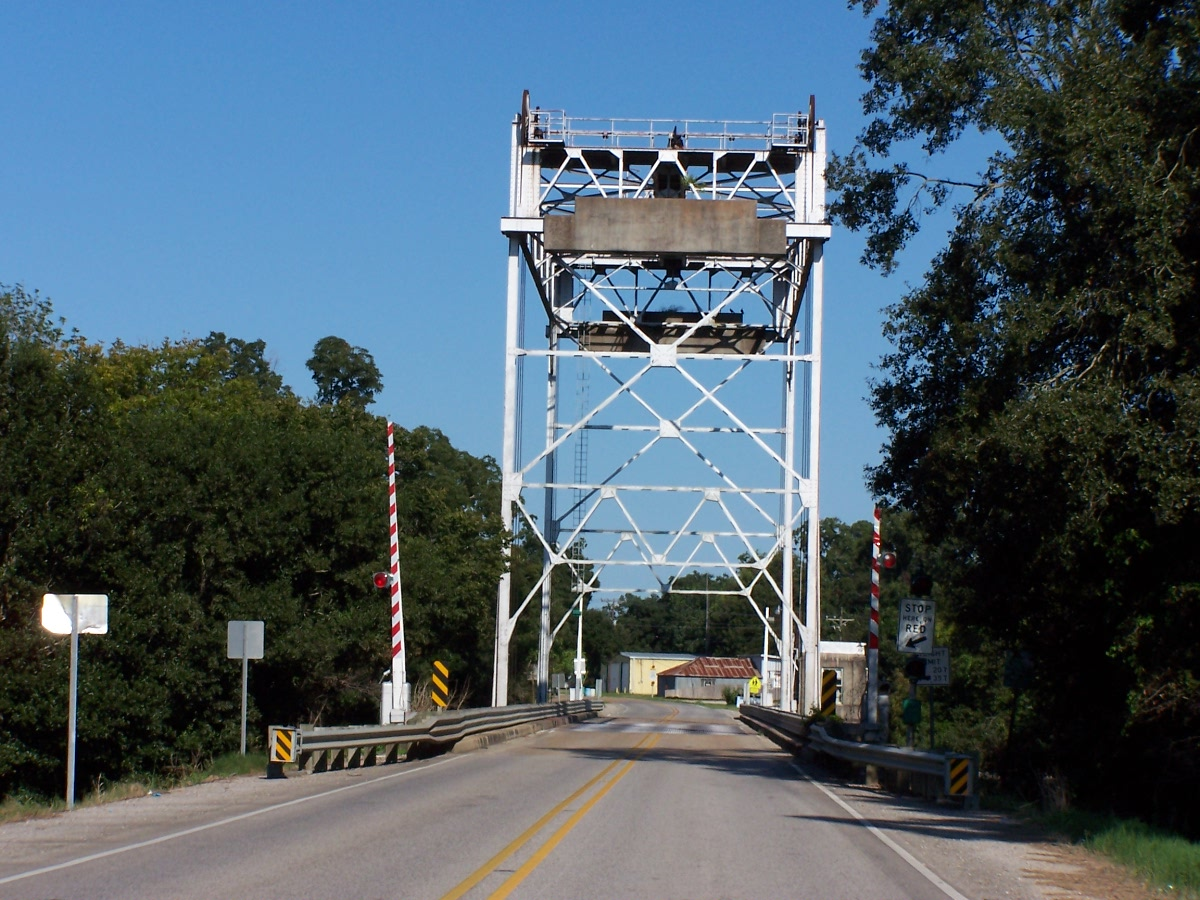
Vermilion River bridge in Milton

Beausoleil Broussard's descendants Eloi Broussard and Darmas Broussard owned and operated a store during the steamboat era. They built a two-story home on the east side of the river in the late 1880s. The home stands at a bridge there today. A ferry operated at the Milton site probably as early as 1820. At the December 14, 1897, meeting of the Vermilion Parish Police Jury, it was suggested that a bridge be built across the river there. That bridge was dedicated on February 2, 1902. The present bridge was built in 1948.

In 1885, Milton R. Cushman came to the area to practice medicine. Dr. Cushman petitioned for a post office at the Desire Broussard place and became the first postmaster there. The mail was left at his medical office. When postal officials asked for a name for the locale, Dr. Cushman's wife decided upon Milton—the name of her husband and of her son, Milton S. Cushman, who was born in 1890.

== Geography ==
The unincorporated community of Milton is in southern Lafayette Parish, on the east side of the Vermilion River, which forms the Vermilion Parish line. It is approximately 11 miles (18 km) south of Lafayette the parish seat, and about 12 miles (19 km) north of Abbeville, the parish seat of Vermilion.

According to the U.S. Census Bureau, the Milton CDP has a total area of 4.7 square miles (12.1 km^{2}), of which 0.03 square miles (0.08 km^{2}), or 0.69%, are water.

== Demographics ==
Historical population
Census	Pop.	Note	%±
2010	3,030		—
2020	2,590		−14.5%
U.S. Decennial Census

Milton was first listed as a census designated place in the 2010 U.S. census.

Milton racial composition
Race	Number	Percentage
White (non-Hispanic)	2,287	88.3%
Black or African American (non-Hispanic)	105	4.05%
Native American	4	0.15%
Asian	20	0.77%
Other/Mixed	77	2.97%
Hispanic or Latino	97	3.75%

As of the 2020 United States census, there were 2,590 people, 858 households, and 577 families residing in the CDP. The 2019 American Community Survey determined 2,299 people lived in Milton, down from 3,030 at the 2010 United States census. Of the population, 1,052 were male and 1,247 were female with a ratio of 84.4 males per 100 females. The community had a median age of 45.1 and 1,902 people aged 18 and older were registered voters. In 2019, the racial and ethnic makeup of Milton was 95.7% non-Hispanic white and 4.3% Black and African American.

== Education ==
Milton is part of the Lafayette Parish School System.

- Milton Elementary School
- Milton Middle School

== See also ==
- List of cities, towns, and villages in Louisiana
- Acadiana
- Cajun
- French Louisiana
