= Lydia, Louisiana =

- Census-designated place
- Location of Lydia in Louisiana
- Coordinates: 29°55′35″N 91°46′53″W
- Country: United States
- State: Louisiana
- Parish: Iberia
- Incorporated: 1908

Area
  - Total: 1.70 sq mi (4.41 km^{2})
  - Land: 1.70 sq mi (4.41 km^{2})
  - Water: 0 sq mi (0.00 km^{2})
- Elevation: 10 ft (3.0 m)

Population (2020)
  - Total: 892
  - Density: 524.3/sq mi (202.44/km^{2})
- Time zone: UTC-6 (CST)
  - Summer (DST): UTC-5 (CDT)
- ZIP Code: 70569
- Area code: 337
- FIPS code: 22-46755
- GNIS feature ID: 2403248

Lydia is an unincorporated community and census-designated place (CDP) in Iberia Parish, Louisiana, United States. As of the 2020 census, Lydia had a population of 892. It is part of the New Iberia Micropolitan Statistical Area.

== Geography ==
Lydia is located approximately 8 miles (13 km) southeast of New Iberia, the parish seat. U.S. Route 90, a four-lane freeway, forms the northern edge of the community and leads northwest 26 miles (42 km) to Lafayette and southeast 41 miles (66 km) to Morgan City.

According to the United States Census Bureau, the Lydia CDP has a total area of 1.7 square miles (4.4 km^{2}), all land.

== Demographics ==
Historical population
Census	Pop.	Note	%±
1990	1,136		—
2000	1,079		−5.0%
2010	952		−11.8%
2020	892		−6.3%
U.S. Decennial Census; 1950 1960 1970 1980; 1990 2000 2010

Lydia first appeared as a census designated place the 1990 U.S. census.

As of the census of 2000, there were 1,079 people, 385 households, and 302 families residing in the CDP. The population density was 630.8 inhabitants per square mile (243.6/km^{2}). There were 411 housing units at an average density of 240.3 per square mile (92.8/km^{2}). The racial makeup of the CDP was 86.38% White, 11.21% African American, 0.09% Native American, 0.93% Asian, 0.56% from other races, and 0.83% from two or more races. Hispanic or Latino of any race were 0.65% of the population.

There were 385 households, out of which 34.5% had children under the age of 18 living with them, 62.6% were married couples living together, 10.4% had a female householder with no husband present, and 21.3% were non-families. 17.9% of all households were made up of individuals, and 9.4% had someone living alone who was 65 years of age or older. The average household size was 2.80 and the average family size was 3.16.

In the CDP, the population was spread out, with 26.5% under the age of 18, 8.7% from 18 to 24, 29.6% from 25 to 44, 22.3% from 45 to 64, and 12.9% who were 65 years of age or older. The median age was 36 years. For every 100 females, there were 104.0 males. For every 100 females age 18 and over, there were 104.4 males.

The median income for a household in the CDP was $41,146, and the median income for a family was $42,500. Males had a median income of $36,176 versus $19,211 for females. The per capita income for the CDP was $16,395. About 3.9% of families and 5.1% of the population were below the poverty line, including none of those under age 18 and 18.8% of those age 65 or over.
