= Kraemer, Louisiana =

- Census-designated place
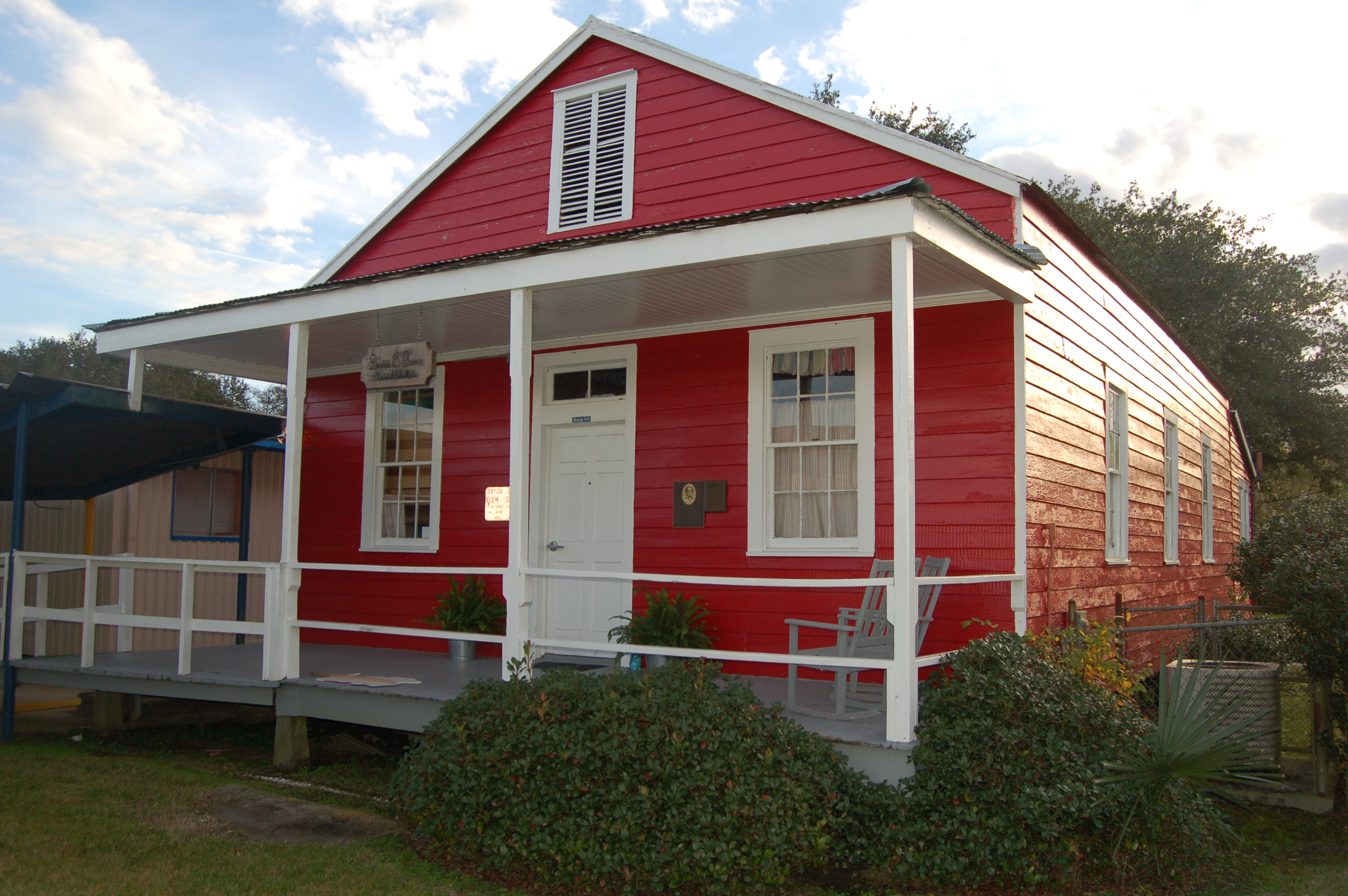
- "Little Red Schoolhouse" of Bayou Boeuf Elementary School

- Location within Louisiana Location within the United States
- Coordinates: 29°52′01″N 90°41′49″W
- Country: United States
- State: Louisiana
- Parish: Lafourche

Area
  - Total: 5.32 sq mi (13.79 km^{2})
  - Land: 5.25 sq mi (13.59 km^{2})
  - Water: 0.077 sq mi (0.20 km^{2})
- Elevation: 3 ft (0.91 m)

Population (2020)
  - Total: 877
  - Density: 167.1/sq mi (64.51/km^{2})
- Time zone: UTC-6 (Central (CST))
  - Summer (DST): UTC-5 (CDT)
- ZIP code: 70371
- Area code: 985
- GNIS feature ID: 536230

Kraemer is a census-designated place (CDP) in Lafourche Parish, Louisiana, United States. As of the 2020 census, Kraemer had a population of 877. Its ZIP code is 70371. It is also known as Bayou Boeuf.

== Demographics ==
Historical population
| Census | Pop. | Note | %± |
|---|---|---|---|
| 2010 | 934 | | — |
| 2020 | 877 | | −6.1% |
U.S. Decennial Census

Kraemer was first listed as a census designated place in the 2010 U.S. census.

== Education ==
Lafourche Parish Public Schools is the school district of the whole parish, and operates area public schools. Bayou Boeuf Elementary School, Sixth Ward Middle School, and Thibodaux High School serve the Bayou Boeuf area.

Fletcher Technical Community College has Lafourche Parish in the college's service area. Additionally, a Delgado Community College document stated that Lafourche Parish was in the college's service area.

== Government and infrastructure ==
Residents are served by the Ward 6 Senior Citizens Center.
