= Louisiana Highway 96 =

State highway in Louisiana, United States

Louisiana Highway 96

- Route of LA 96 highlighted in red

Route information
- Maintained by Louisiana DOTD
- Length: 19.543 mi (31.451 km)
- Existed: 1955 renumbering–present
- Tourist routes: Louisiana Scenic Byway: Bayou Teche Byway

Major junctions
- West end: LA 182 in Broussard
- LA 31 in St. Martinville
- East end: LA 352 east of Catahoula

Location
- Country: United States
- State: Louisiana
- Parishes: Lafayette, St. Martin

Highway system
- Louisiana State Highway System; Interstate; US; State; Scenic
← LA 95	→ LA 97
← SR 85	SR 86	→ SR 87
← SR 478	SR 479	→ SR 480

Louisiana Highway 96 (LA 96) is a state highway located in southern Louisiana. It runs 19.54 miles (31.45 km) in an east–west direction from LA 182 in Broussard to LA 352 east of Catahoula.

The route passes through St. Martinville, the seat of St. Martin Parish, located on Bayou Teche. It connects the city with U.S. Highway 90 (US 90), the main highway through the Teche region, just southeast of Lafayette. East of St. Martinville, LA 96 travels to the small community of Catahoula, which is located on Catahoula Lake at the edge of the Atchafalaya Basin.

== Route description ==
From the west, LA 96 begins at an intersection with LA 182 (Old Spanish Trail) in an area within the Broussard city limits known as Billeaud. This intersection is located about 300 feet (91 m) from an interchange with US 90, connecting with the larger adjacent city of Lafayette as well as New Iberia. LA 96 heads east on Terrace Highway and initially passes a few small industrial establishments before entering an area of light suburban development. After one mile (1.6 km), the highway crosses from Lafayette Parish into St. Martin Parish. Soon afterward, LA 96 crosses over a small coulee as the surroundings become rural. The route makes a sharp dip to the south before proceeding in a southeast direction into the small city of St. Martinville.

LA 96 follows West Port Street through town to an intersection with LA 31 (Main Street), the main north–south thoroughfare. It then turns north to follow LA 31 for one block, flanked by a series of historic storefronts and a large Catholic church. Signs direct motorists to continue straight ahead on LA 31 to reach the Longfellow-Evangeline State Historic Site while LA 96 turns east onto East Bridge Street. Shortly afterward, the highway crosses a swing bridge over Bayou Teche dating from 1942. Two blocks east of the bayou, LA 96 intersects LA 347 (Cemetery Road), signed as the truck route through town. The two highways run concurrent for one block past the local cemetery, and LA 347 turns north onto Resweber Street.

LA 96 continues straight ahead out of St. Martinville and becomes known as Catahoula Highway. It then curves to the northeast at an intersection with LA 345, which heads south toward Loreauville. Less than two miles (3.2 km) later, LA 96 intersects LA 679, which heads through an area known as Coteau Holmes. Over the next seven miles (11 km), LA 96 continues in a general northeast direction, curving here and there through rural farmland mixed with light suburban development. Along the way, it passes through points known as Isle Labbe and Catahoula Cove. LA 96 then enters the small community of Catahoula and serves as its main thoroughfare. The route curves to the southeast and briefly parallels a wide section of a bayou called Catahoula Lake. It then turns northeast to cross a bridge over the waterway and proceeds a short distance to its terminus at LA 352, known as Catahoula Levee Road to the north and Bayou Benoit Levee Road to the south. Straight ahead across the levee are the vast wetlands of the Atchafalaya Basin.

=== Route classification and data ===
LA 96 is generally classified by the Louisiana Department of Transportation and Development (La DOTD) as a rural major collector west of St. Martinville, an urban minor arterial through town, and a rural minor collector east of town. Daily traffic volume in 2013 averaged between 6,500 and 8,100 vehicles west of St. Martinville, peaking at 10,100 at the Bayou Teche bridge. The lighter traveled portion of the route between St. Martinville and Catahoula averaged 2,200 vehicles daily. The posted speed limit is generally 55 mph (90 km/h), reduced to 25 mph (40 km/h) through St. Martinville and Catahoula.

The portion of LA 96 between St. Martinville and Catahoula is part of the Bayou Teche Byway in the state-designated system of tourist routes known as the Louisiana Scenic Byways.

== History ==
=== Pre-1955 route numbering ===
In the original Louisiana Highway system in use between 1921 and 1955, the modern LA 96 was part of two separate routes.

==== Western section ====
State Route 479
- Location: Billeaud–St. Martinville
- Length: 7.4 mi (11.9 km)
- Existed: 1928–1955

The section from the western terminus to the present intersection with LA 31 in St. Martinville was designated as State Route 479. It was added to the state highway system in 1928 by an act of the state legislature.

Route 479. Beginning at a point on Route 2 Lafayette Parish about 1000 feet south of the Billeaud Sugar Factory, thence running in an easterly direction over the long bridge to the Ducamps[sic] Plantation to meet the old Terrace Road.

— 1928 legislative route description

At this time, the Broussard city limits encompassed a much smaller area, and the location of the western terminus was known as Billeaud. The western terminus was also originally a junction with US 90, which was co-signed throughout the state with the pre-1955 State Route 2. LA 182 now follows the former route of US 90 through the area. The legislative description for Route 479 also reflects the fact that the route originally ended at the Duchamp Plantation Road a few miles west of St. Martinville with State Route 235 continuing the route into town. Road maps from the era generally show the entire length as Route 479, possibly due to a necessary lack of detail at that scale. However, the entire route between Billeaud and St. Martinville was officially designated as Route 479 sometime before the 1955 Louisiana Highway renumbering with Route 235 truncated to the modern intersection of LA 96 and Duchamps Road.

==== Eastern section ====
State Route 86
- Location: St. Martinville–Catahoula
- Length: 12.1 mi (19.5 km)
- Existed: 1921–1955

The remainder of the present route of LA 96 from St. Martinville to Catahoula was designated as State Route 86 in the pre-1955 system. Route 86 was created in 1921 by an act of the state legislature as one of the original 98 state highway routes.

Route No. 86. Beginning at St. Martinville, through Isle Labbe to Lake Catahoula.

— 1921 legislative route description

The present swing bridge across Bayou Teche in St. Martinville was built in 1942, replacing an older movable span at that location. On the opposite end of the route, the highway originally ended at the west bank of Lake Catahoula. By the time of the 1955 renumbering, a road had been constructed along the nearby Atchafalaya Basin levee. A bridge was built to connect Route 86 to this road, which was not part of the state highway system at this time. Route 86 otherwise remained the same during the pre-1955 era.

=== Post-1955 route history ===
LA 96 was created in 1955 as a collective renumbering of former State Routes 86 and 479.

Class "B": La 96—From a junction with La-US 90 at or near Billeaud to a junction with La 31 at or near St. Martinville.
Class "C": La 96—From a junction with La 347 at or near St. Martinville through or near Isle Labbe and Catahoula to point at or near Catahoula Lake.

— 1955 legislative route description

With the 1955 renumbering, the state highway department initially categorized all routes into three classes: "A" (primary), "B" (secondary), and "C" (farm-to-market). This system has since been updated and replaced by a more specific functional classification system.

The route of LA 96 has remained the same since the 1955 renumbering, although the route designations of the highways at both termini have changed. Around 1969, US 90 was moved onto its present four-lane alignment between the Broussard (or Billeaud) interchange and New Iberia. LA 182 was extended over the former route of US 90 and became the new western terminus of LA 96 at this time. At the opposite end of the route, the bridge across Catahoula Lake was replaced by the current span in 1994. In the early 2000s, the road along the Atchafalaya Basin levee marking the eastern terminus of LA 96 had been added to the state highway system as a southern extension of LA 352, which had formerly terminated in Henderson.

== Major intersections ==
Parish	Location	mi	km	Destinations	Notes
Lafayette	Broussard	0.000	0.000	LA 182 (Old Spanish Trail) to US 90 – Lafayette, New Iberia	Western terminus
St. Martin	St. Martinville	7.355	11.837	LA 31 south (South Main Street) – New Iberia	West end of LA 31 concurrency
St. Martin	St. Martinville	7.465	12.014	LA 31 north (North Main Street) – Breaux Bridge	East end of LA 31 concurrency; to Evangeline State Park
St. Martin	St. Martinville	7.601– 7.645	12.233– 12.303	Bridge over Bayou Teche	
St. Martin	St. Martinville	7.780	12.521	LA 347 south (Cemetery Road)	West end of LA 347 concurrency (signed as LA 347 Truck)
St. Martin	St. Martinville	7.886	12.691	LA 347 north (Resweber Street)	East end of LA 347 concurrency (signed as LA 347 Truck)
St. Martin		9.083	14.618	LA 345 (Burton Plantation Highway) – Loreauville	Northern terminus of LA 345
St. Martin		10.818	17.410	LA 679 (Coteau Holmes Highway) – Coteau Holmes	Northern terminus of LA 679
St. Martin	Catahoula	18.829– 18.897	30.302– 30.412	Bridge over Catahoula Lake	
St. Martin		19.543	31.451	LA 352 (Catahoula Levee Road, Bayou Benoit Levee Road)	Eastern terminus
1.000 mi = 1.609 km; 1.000 km = 0.621 mi: Concurrency terminus
