= Bayou Teche Byway =

The Bayou Teche Byway is a Louisiana Scenic Byway that follows several different state highways, primarily:

- LA 31 and LA 182 along the west bank of Bayou Teche from Morgan City to Arnaudville;
- LA 86 and LA 87 along the east bank of the bayou from Charenton to New Iberia;
- LA 96 and LA 352 in a loop off of the bayou from St. Martinville to Henderson via Catahoula; and
- LA 347 along the east bank of the bayou from Breaux Bridge to Arnaudville.
