= Louisiana Highway 86 =

State highway in Louisiana, United States

Louisiana Highway 86

- Route of LA 86 highlighted in red

Route information
- Maintained by Louisiana DOTD
- Length: 16.42 mi (26.43 km)
- Existed: 1955 renumbering–present
- Tourist routes: Louisiana Scenic Byway: Bayou Teche Byway

Major junctions
- South end: LA 182 in New Iberia
- North end: LA 31 north of New Iberia

Location
- Country: United States
- State: Louisiana
- Parishes: Iberia

Highway system
- Louisiana State Highway System; Interstate; US; State; Scenic
← LA 85	→ LA 87
← SR 55	SR 56	→ SR 57
← SR 445	SR 446	→ SR 447

Louisiana Highway 86 (LA 86) is a state highway located in southern Louisiana. It runs 16.42 miles (26.43 km) in a general north–south direction from LA 182 in New Iberia to LA 31 north of town.

LA 86 follows the east bank of Bayou Teche as it makes a hairpin turn in Iberia Parish. It initially heads eastward from New Iberia, the parish seat, then north through the village of Loreauville, and finally in a general southwestern direction to a point almost on the St. Martin Parish line. Outside of New Iberia, the route travels through a thin ribbon of residential development in otherwise rural surroundings. LA 86 crosses Bayou Teche twice by way of movable bridges near each terminus. It essentially makes a long loop off of LA 31, which otherwise closely follows the west bank of the bayou from New Iberia northward toward St. Martinville. Signage for LA 86 does not carry directional banners.

== Route description ==
From the south, LA 86 begins at an intersection with LA 182 in New Iberia. LA 182 follows the one-way couplet of Main and St. Peter Streets through the city's Historic Commercial District. LA 86 proceeds northeast on Julia Street for one block through the couplet then makes a zigzag onto Main Street for half a block. The route turns northeast on Bridge Street and crosses a bascule bridge over Bayou Teche, which flows through the center of town. Now known as Duperier Avenue, LA 86 proceeds through a residential neighborhood and intersects LA 87 at Oak Street. LA 87 mirrors the route of LA 182 on the opposite bank of Bayou Teche toward Jeanerette. After several blocks, LA 86 turns eastward onto Loreauville Road and parallels the bayou to the east end of New Iberia.

Just outside the city limits, LA 87 passes through an area known as Morbihan, where it intersects LA 344 (Sugar Oaks Road) and LA 3195 (Emile Verret Road). 2 miles (3.2 km) later, LA 86 intersects LA 320 (Belle Place-Olivier Road), which heads southwest to Olivier between New Iberia and Jeanerette. LA 86 curves northward with Bayou Teche as the residential development thins out somewhat, giving way to more rural farmland. After crossing the Loreauville Canal, the highway passes through an area known as Vida. Soon afterward, it enters the village of Loreauville and travels along Main Street. At the intersection of Main and Bridge Streets, LA 86 has a second junction with LA 344 at the opposite end of its route. Soon afterward, LA 86 intersects LA 3242, which travels eastward to Dauterive Landing on the shore of Lake Dauterive.

Leaving Loreauville, LA 86 curves around a northern bend in Bayou Teche and intersects two state highways located 2 miles (3.2 km) apart: LA 345 (Coteau Holmes Road) and LA 680 (Bacon Road). Now heading southwest as Daspit Road, LA 86 curves away from the bayou, which then snakes back toward the highway at Daspit. Here, LA 86 intersects LA 347, which heads north toward St. Martinville. LA 86 crosses the bayou a second time, this time via swing bridge, then turns northwest onto Belmont Road along the bayou's opposite bank. The route terminates shortly afterward at a second junction with LA 31 located about 600 feet (180 m) from the St. Martin Parish line between New Iberia and St. Martinville.

=== Route classification and data ===
LA 86 is an undivided two-lane highway for its entire length. It is generally classified as a rural major or minor collector by the Louisiana Department of Transportation and Development (La DOTD). However, the portions of the route running through New Iberia and Loreauville are classified as an urban minor arterial and an urban collector, respectively. Daily traffic volume in 2013 averaged 10,900 vehicles over most of the route between New Iberia and Loreauville, peaking at 13,300 through the former. The lowest figure reported was 1,650 vehicles through the Daspit area.

The posted speed limit is generally 55 mph (90 km/h), reduced to 35 mph (55 km/h) through St. Martinville and 30 mph (50 km/h) through Loreauville.

The entirety of LA 86 is part of the Bayou Teche Byway in the state-designated system of tourist routes known as the Louisiana Scenic Byways.

== History ==
=== Pre-1955 route numbering ===
In the original Louisiana Highway system in use between 1921 and 1955, the modern LA 86 was part of two separate routes.

==== Southern section ====
State Route 56
- Location: New Iberia–Lake Dauterive
- Length: 15.1 mi (24.3 km)
- Existed: 1921–1955

The section from the southern terminus to the present intersection with LA 3242 in Loreauville made up the majority of State Route 56. It was designated in 1921 by an act of the state legislature as one of the original 98 state highway routes.

Route 56. Beginning at New Iberia, thence through Loreauville to Dautrive's[sic] Landing.

— 1921 legislative route description

While LA 86 continues from Loreauville around the northern bend in Bayou Teche, Route 56 turned east in Loreauville to follow the entirety of what is now LA 3242 to Lake Dauterive. The route remained the same up to the 1955 Louisiana Highway renumbering.

==== Northern section ====
State Route 446
- Location: Iberia Parish
- Length: 6.2 mi (10.0 km)
- Existed: 1928–1955

The remainder of the present route of LA 86 from Loreauville to the north side of New Iberia was generally designated as State Route 446 in the pre-1955 system. Route 446 was added to the state highway system in 1928 by an act of the state legislature.

Route 446. Beginning at St. Martin Parish line in Iberia Parish on the east bank of Bayou Teche thence following Bayou Teche on its east bank to meet Route 56 at Loreauville.

— 1928 legislative route description

The only difference in the pre-1955 route is that instead of crossing Bayou Teche at Daspit, Route 446 turned northwest to follow what is now LA 347 for a short distance to the St. Martin Parish line. The short section of LA 86 connecting to LA 31 (pre-1955 State Route 25) was not part of the state highway system at that time. Route 446 remained the same up to the 1955 renumbering.

=== Post-1955 route history ===
LA 86 was created in 1955 as a collective renumbering of former State Route 446 and the majority of State Route 56.

La 86—From a junction with La-US 90 at or near New Iberia through or near Morbihan and Loreauville to a junction with La 31 near New Iberia.

— 1955 legislative route description

The route description reflects the fact that the southern terminus in New Iberia was once a junction with US 90. This changed around 1969 when US 90 was moved onto its current alignment through the area. LA 182 was then extended to cover the former route. Apart from the smoothing of some curves, only a minor change has been made to the route of LA 86 since the 1955 renumbering. US 90 (current LA 182) became a four-lane highway through New Iberia around 1964 when a one-way couplet was created along Main and St. Peter Streets. Main Street had formerly carried both directions of traffic. In order to meet the new eastbound lanes of US 90, the LA 86 designation was extended one block from Main to St. Peter Street. Also in 1964, the current swing bridge over Bayou Teche at Daspit was constructed, replacing an older span at that location.

== Major intersections ==
The entire highway is in Iberia Parish.

Location	mi	km	Destinations	Notes
New Iberia	0.0	0.0	LA 182 (St. Peter Street, Main Street) – Jeanerette, Lafayette	Southern terminus; one-way pair
New Iberia	0.2	0.32	Bridge over Bayou Teche	
New Iberia	0.6	0.97	LA 87 (Oak Street) – Olivier, Jeanerette	Western terminus of LA 87
Morbihan	3.0	4.8	LA 344 (Sugar Oaks Road) / LA 3195 (Emile Verret Road)	Southern terminus of LA 344; northern terminus of LA 3195
	4.9	7.9	LA 320 west (Belle Place-Olivier Road) – Olivier	Northern terminus of LA 320
Loreauville	9.1	14.6	LA 344 (Bridge Street)	Northern terminus of LA 344
Loreauville	9.6	15.4	LA 3242 (Lake Dauterive Road)	Western terminus of LA 3242
	10.6	17.1	LA 345 (Coteau Holmes Road) – Coteau Holmes	Southern terminus of LA 345
	12.5	20.1	LA 680 (Bacon Road)	Southeastern terminus of LA 680
Daspit	15.0	24.1	LA 347 (Cemetery Road) – St. Martinville	Southern terminus of LA 347
Daspit	15.3	24.6	Bridge over Bayou Teche	
	16.4	26.4	LA 31 (Jane Street) – New Iberia, St. Martinville	Northern terminus
1.000 mi = 1.609 km; 1.000 km = 0.621 mi
