= Louisiana Highway 87 =

State highway in Louisiana, United States

Louisiana Highway 87

- Route of LA 87 highlighted in red

Route information
- Maintained by Louisiana DOTD
- Length: 42.044 mi (67.663 km)
- Existed: 1955 renumbering–present
- Tourist routes: Louisiana Scenic Byway: Bayou Teche Byway

Major junctions
- West end: LA 86 in New Iberia
- East end: Local road north of Centerville

Location
- Country: United States
- State: Louisiana
- Parishes: Iberia, St. Mary

Highway system
- Louisiana State Highway System; Interstate; US; State; Scenic
← LA 86	→ LA 88

Louisiana Highway 87 (LA 87) is a state highway located in southern Louisiana. It runs 42.04 miles (67.66 km) in a northwest to southeast direction from LA 86 in New Iberia to the junction of two local roads north of Centerville.

The route parallels Bayou Teche downstream from New Iberia through Iberia Parish and into neighboring St. Mary Parish. It is the east bank counterpart to the busier LA 182 (the former path of U.S. Highway 90), along which most of the area's populated communities are located. A succession of bridges connect LA 87 with these communities, which include Jeanerette, Charenton, Baldwin, and Franklin. Points of interest along LA 87 include the Bayside antebellum plantation house opposite the Hubertville section of Jeanerette, as well as several sites associated with the Chitimacha Indian tribe at Charenton.

LA 87 was designated in the 1955 Louisiana Highway renumbering, joining together four shorter former routes created between 1926 and 1930. Two years later, a spur was designated when the original swing bridge was constructed on Lewis Street in New Iberia. It has since been replaced by a vertical lift bridge known as the Elias "Bo" Ackal Memorial Bridge, which was constructed in 2007 at the same location.

== Route description ==
=== New Iberia to Jeanerette ===
From the northwest, LA 87 begins at a junction with LA 86 (Duperier Avenue) in the city of New Iberia. It heads southeast as an undivided two-lane highway through a residential neighborhood, initially traveling along Oak Street. After a few blocks, however, the route makes a zigzag over to Parkview Drive via Ashton Street. Exactly one mile (1.6 km) along the route is an intersection with North Lewis Avenue, a commercial thoroughfare that is designated as LA 87 Spur and crosses a vertical lift bridge over Bayou Teche.

After exiting the city limits, LA 87 continues to parallel the east bank of the bayou through unincorporated Iberia Parish for approximately 10 miles (16 km). During this stretch, the surroundings gradually transition from a mixture of farmland and newer suburban development to being generally rural. A succession of bridges connect LA 87 with the busier west bank of Bayou Teche. The first two are located at junctions with LA 3195 and LA 320 near Olivier. These are followed by locally maintained bridges near Lifenite and Loisel. Continuing southeast, two state highway bridges connect LA 87 with the city of Jeanerette on the opposite bank. These are located at LA 3182 and LA 671. Just before reaching the junction with LA 3182, the highway passes under a canopy of moss-laden live oak trees in front of the historic Bayside plantation home.

=== Jeanerette to Centerville ===
After crossing into St. Mary Parish, LA 87 continues eastward alongside Bayou Teche, with bridges opposite Sorrel (local), Adeline (LA 670), and Charenton (LA 324). At Charenton, LA 87 follows the first of several sharp bends in Bayou Teche as it passes the Chitimacha Indian Reservation and crosses a navigation channel that connects the bayou to several waterways within the Atchafalaya Basin. Opposite a second bend is the town of Baldwin, which has no bridge connection within the corporate limits. In an area known as Oaklawn, the paved roadway turns west across the bayou onto LA 323. Meanwhile, LA 87 continues ahead onto a gravel farm road for over five miles (8.0 km), turning sharply to the west near the midway point.

Immediately after entering the Franklin city limits, the paved roadway resumes at a junction with LA 322. Shortly afterward, a junction with LA 3069 (East Willow Street) leads straight ahead across Bayou Teche into town, and LA 87 turns to the southeast, maintaining its path along the bayou's east bank. State maintenance ends 4.5 miles (7.2 km) later at the approach to the Centerville bridge. A local road known as Verdunville Road continues the path of LA 87 along Bayou Teche toward its junction with the Wax Lake Outlet.

=== Route classification and data ===
LA 87 alternates between an urban collector and a rural minor collector over most of its route, as determined by the Louisiana Department of Transportation and Development (La DOTD). Daily traffic volume in 2013 peaked at 8,100 vehicles through New Iberia and as far as the junction with LA 320. The gravel portion of the route between Oaklawn and Franklin is classified as a rural local road with the traffic count reported at only 42 vehicles per day. The posted speed limit gradually increases from 25 mph (40 km/h) in New Iberia to 55 mph (90 km/h) as the surroundings become less populated.

The entirety of LA 87 from New Iberia to Charenton is part of the Bayou Teche Byway in the state-designated system of tourist routes known as the Louisiana Scenic Byways.

== History ==
The Louisiana Highway Commission and the state's first system of numbered highways were created in 1921. Five years later, the first portion of what is now LA 87 was taken into the system. This included only the portion extending from the Iberia–St. Mary parish line to the Charenton bridge, which was designated as State Route 129. The remainder of the distance between New Iberia and Centerville was added by two further acts of the state legislature in 1928 and 1930. As was common practice within the system at that time, these extensions were not made part of the existing route but were each given new numbers. The roadway continuing Route 129 from the parish line upstream to New Iberia was designated as Route 443. The portion extending downstream from the Charenton bridge became Route 902 to a point known as Pleasant Hill opposite Baldwin. Route 906 continued from there to a point opposite Verdunville, slightly further than the present terminus of LA 87. Complicating matters even further, the numbers 901 and 902 were duplicated in the 1930 act, with Route 902 also defining an unrelated roadway on the opposite side of Bayou Teche. During the decade, a "-D" suffix was added to the other Route 902 to distinguish the two routes.

These matters were simplified in 1955 when the Louisiana Department of Highways, the successor to the Highway Commission, renumbered the entire state highway system. The former Routes 129, 443, 902, and 906 were grouped under the single designation of LA 87. Thus, the state-maintained roadway along the east bank of Bayou Teche below New Iberia now carried one highway number over its entire length rather than four.

Class "B": La 87—From a junction with La 86 at or near New Iberia to a junction with La 320 at or near Olivier.
Class "C": La 87—From a junction with La 320 at or near Olivier through or near Jeanerette, Charenton and Centerville to the west bank of Verdunville Canal.

— 1955 legislative route description

With the 1955 renumbering, the state highway department initially categorized all routes into three classes: "A" (primary), "B" (secondary), and "C" (farm-to-market). This system has since been updated and replaced by a more specific functional classification system.

Since 1955, the route of LA 87 has experienced only minor differences. The junction with LA 86 in New Iberia was moved a few blocks away from the Bayou Teche bridge at the time of the renumbering or shortly afterward. The pre-1955 route began at the intersection of Duperier Avenue and Marie Street and followed Marie Street and Pollard Avenue to reach Parkview Drive. In Franklin, a zigzag was eliminated around 1963 to provide a direct approach to the new Willow Street bridge. Finally, LA 87 was slightly shortened on its southeastern end after the present bridge at Centerville was constructed in 1972, replacing an earlier bridge that was located downstream at Schwan Street. As of 2017, the portion of LA 87 from LA 86 to LA 87 Spur is under agreement to be removed from the state highway system and transferred to local control.

== Future ==
La DOTD is currently engaged in a program that aims to transfer about 5,000 miles (8,000 km) of state-owned roadways to local governments over the next several years. Under this plan of "right-sizing" the state highway system, the portion of LA 87 between Oaklawn and Centerville is proposed for deletion as it no longer meets a significant interurban travel function.

== Major intersections ==
Parish	Location	mi	km	Destinations	Notes
Iberia	New Iberia	0.000	0.000	LA 86 (Duperier Avenue)	Western terminus
Iberia	New Iberia	1.027	1.653	LA 87 Spur (North Lewis Avenue)	Northern terminus of LA 87 Spur
Iberia		2.400	3.862	LA 3195 (Emile Verret Road)	
Iberia		4.198	6.756	LA 320 (Belle Place-Olivier Road) – Loreauville	
Iberia		9.813	15.792	LA 3182 (Bayside Street)	Northern terminus of LA 3182
Iberia		11.428	18.392	LA 671 (Lewis Street) – Jeanerette	Northern terminus of LA 671
St. Mary		16.754	26.963	LA 670 – Baldwin	Northern terminus of LA 670
St. Mary		21.092	33.944	LA 324 – Charenton	Eastern terminus of LA 324
St. Mary	Oaklawn	31.324	50.411	LA 323 (Oaklawn Bridge Approach Road)	Eastern terminus of LA 323
St. Mary	Franklin	36.981	59.515	LA 322 (Sterling Bridge Approach Road) – Sterling	Eastern terminus of LA 322
St. Mary	Franklin	37.531	60.400	LA 3069 (East Willow Street)	Eastern terminus of LA 3069
St. Mary		42.044	67.663	Verdunville Road / Centerville Bridge Approach Road	Eastern terminus
1.000 mi = 1.609 km; 1.000 km = 0.621 mi

== Spur route ==
Louisiana Highway 87 Spur
- Location: New Iberia
- Length: 0.491 mi (790 m)
- Existed: 1957–present

Louisiana Highway 87 Spur (LA 87 Spur) runs 0.49 miles (0.79 km) in a southwest to northeast direction, consisting largely of a vertical lift bridge across Bayou Teche in New Iberia. The route connects LA 87 with LA 182, which travels along the opposite bank of the bayou.

The designation of LA 87 Spur originated in 1957 when the state constructed a two-lane swing bridge across Bayou Teche at the foot of Lewis Street. The route was extended one block from Main Street to St. Peter Street in the mid-1960s when a one-way pair along those streets was put into effect. This gave US 90 (now LA 182) a four-lane corridor through New Iberia. In 2008, the original swing bridge was replaced by the current five-lane vertical lift bridge, which was officially dedicated as the Elias "Bo" Ackal Memorial Bridge in honor of the deceased local politician. Lewis Street was slightly realigned and widened to four lanes with a center turning lane to match the capacity of the new bridge.

LA 87 Spur is designated as an urban minor arterial by the Louisiana Department of Transportation and Development (La DOTD). Daily traffic volume in 2013 was reported as 21,600 vehicles. As is typical for the state's highway spurs, the mileage for LA 87 Spur increases from the junction with its parent route regardless of geographic direction.

Major intersections
The entire highway is in New Iberia, Iberia Parish.

mi	km	Destinations	Notes
0.491– 0.347	0.790– 0.558	LA 182 (East St. Peter Street, East Main Street)	Western terminus; one-way pair
0.198– 0.119	0.319– 0.192	Elias "Bo" Ackal Memorial Bridge over Bayou Teche	
0.000	0.000	LA 87 (Parkview Drive)	Eastern terminus
1.000 mi = 1.609 km; 1.000 km = 0.621 mi
