= List of state highways in Louisiana (350–399) =

The following is a list of state highways in the U.S. state of Louisiana designated in the 350-399 range.

== Louisiana Highway 350 ==
Louisiana Highway 350
- Location: Parks
- Length: 0.41 mi (660 m)
- Existed: 1955–present

Louisiana Highway 350 (LA 350) runs 0.41 miles (0.66 km) in an east–west direction, connecting LA 31 and LA 347 via a vertical lift bridge over Bayou Teche in Parks, St. Martin Parish.

== Louisiana Highway 351 ==
Louisiana Highway 351
- Location: Ruth
- Length: 0.71 mi (1,140 m)
- Existed: 1955–present

Louisiana Highway 351 (LA 351) runs 0.71 miles (1.14 km) in an east–west direction, connecting LA 31 and LA 347 via a bridge over Bayou Teche near Ruth, St. Martin Parish.

== Louisiana Highway 352 ==
Louisiana Highway 352
- Location: Lake Fausse Pointe State Park–Henderson
- Length: 25.79 mi (41.50 km)

Louisiana Highway 352 (LA 352) runs 25.79 miles (41.50 km) from Lake Fausse Pointe State Park to Henderson.

== Louisiana Highway 353 ==
Louisiana Highway 353
- Location: Lafayette–St. Martinville
- Length: 12.66 mi (20.37 km)

Louisiana Highway 353 (LA 353) runs 12.66 miles (20.37 km) in a northwest to southeast direction from LA 94 near Lafayette, Lafayette Parish to LA 31 in St. Martinville, St. Martin Parish.

== Louisiana Highway 354 ==
Louisiana Highway 354
- Location: St. Martin Parish
- Length: 2.31 mi (3.72 km)

Louisiana Highway 354 (LA 354) runs 2.31 miles (3.72 km) in a southwest to northeast direction from a junction with LA 341 to LA 31 in St. Martin Parish.

== Louisiana Highway 355 ==
Louisiana Highway 355
- Location: Cecilia
- Length: 0.24 mi (390 m)
- Existed: 1955–present

Louisiana Highway 355 (LA 355) runs 0.24 miles (0.39 km) in an east–west direction, connecting LA 31 and LA 347 via a bridge over Bayou Teche in Cecilia, St. Martin Parish.

== Louisiana Highway 356 ==
Louisiana Highway 356
- Location: Church Point–Cankton
- Length: 5.78 mi (9.30 km)

Louisiana Highway 356 (LA 356) runs 5.78 miles (9.30 km) in an east–west direction from LA 95 southeast of Church Point, Acadia Parish to LA 93 north of Cankton, St. Landry Parish.

== Louisiana Highway 357 ==
Louisiana Highway 357
- Location: Church Point–Opelousas
- Length: 9.51 mi (15.30 km)

Louisiana Highway 357 (LA 357) runs 9.51 miles (15.30 km) in a north–south direction from LA 178 east of Church Point, Acadia Parish to US 190 in Opelousas, St. Landry Parish.

== Louisiana Highway 358 ==
Louisiana Highway 358
- Location: Prudhomme–Shuteston
- Length: 15.24 mi (24.53 km)

Louisiana Highway 358 (LA 358) runs 15.24 miles (24.53 km) from Prudhomme to Shuteston.

== Louisiana Highway 359 ==
Louisiana Highway 359
- Location: Port Barre–Lebeau
- Length: 8.81 mi (14.18 km)

Louisiana Highway 359 (LA 359) runs 8.81 miles (14.18 km) from Port Barre to Lebeau.

== Louisiana Highway 360 ==
Louisiana Highway 360
- Location: Palmetto–Bayou Current
- Length: 8.30 mi (13.36 km)

Louisiana Highway 360 (LA 360) runs 8.30 miles (13.36 km) from Palmetto–Bayou Current.

== Louisiana Highway 361 ==
Louisiana Highway 361
- Location: Lebeau–Evergreen
- Length: 20.09 mi (32.33 km)

Louisiana Highway 361 (LA 361) runs 20.09 miles (32.33 km) from Lebeau to Evergreen.

== Louisiana Highway 362 ==
Louisiana Highway 362
- Location: Evergreen–Cottonport
- Length: 5.02 mi (8.08 km)

Louisiana Highway 362 (LA 362) runs 5.02 miles (8.08 km) from Evergreen to Cottonport.

== Louisiana Highway 363 ==
Louisiana Highway 363
- Location: Ville Platte–Grand Prairie
- Length: 9.29 mi (14.95 km)

Louisiana Highway 363 (LA 363) runs 9.29 miles (14.95 km) from Ville Platte to Grand Prairie.

== Louisiana Highway 364 ==
Louisiana Highway 364
- Location: Mathews
- Length: 0.06 mi (97 m)
- Existed: 1955–2004

Louisiana Highway 364 (LA 364) consisted of a pontoon bridge across Bayou Lafourche in Mathews, Lafourche Parish.

The route was 0.06 miles (0.097 km) long, connecting LA 1 and LA 308 which run along the west and east banks of the bayou, respectively. It was an undivided two-lane highway for its entire length.

In the pre-1955 state highway system, LA 364 was designated as State Route C-2074. LA 364 was created with the 1955 Louisiana Highway renumbering, and became defunct in July 2004 when a new vertical lift bridge was completed 0.8 miles (1.3 km) downstream on an extension of LA 654. The Mathews Pontoon Bridge was closed and demolished as soon as its replacement was opened.

The entire highway was in Mathews, Lafourche Parish.

mi	km	Destinations	Notes
0.00	0.00	LA 1 – Raceland, Lockport	Western terminus
0.06	0.097	LA 308 – Raceland, Lockport	Eastern terminus
1.000 mi = 1.609 km; 1.000 km = 0.621 mi

== Louisiana Highway 365 ==
Louisiana Highway 365
- Location: Acadia Parish
- Length: 20.91 mi (33.65 km)
- Existed: 1955–present

Louisiana Highway 365 (LA 365) runs 20.91 miles (33.65 km) in a general east–west direction from LA 370 east of Iota to LA 98 east of Mire, Acadia Parish.

The route heads east from LA 370 and makes a zigzag via LA 13. Continuing east through Branch, LA 365 intersects LA 35 southwest of Church Point. East of Branch, LA 365 passes through a point known as Higginbotham and intersects LA 95. The highway then zigzags to the southeast and reaches the St. Landry Parish line. Here, it turns due south and proceeds to a point on LA 98 between Mire and Carencro.

== Louisiana Highway 366 ==
Louisiana Highway 366
- Location: Pollock
- Length: 0.80 mi (1,290 m)
- Existed: 1955–present

Louisiana Highway 366 (LA 366) runs 0.80 miles (1.29 km) in a northwest to southeast direction along Patterson Street from US 165 to LA 8 in Pollock, Grant Parish.

== Louisiana Highway 367 ==
Louisiana Highway 367
- Location: Rayne–Eunice
- Length: 17.35 mi (27.92 km)

Louisiana Highway 367 (LA 367) runs 17.35 miles (27.92 km) from Rayne to Eunice.

== Louisiana Highway 368 ==
Louisiana Highway 368
- Location: Acadia Parish
- Length: 12.56 mi (20.21 km)

Louisiana Highway 368 (LA 368) runs 12.56 miles (20.21 km) in Acadia Parish.

== Louisiana Highway 370 ==
Louisiana Highway 370
- Location: Iota–Church Point
- Length: 23.45 mi (37.74 km)

Louisiana Highway 370 (LA 370) runs 23.45 miles (37.74 km) from Iota to Church Point.

== Louisiana Highway 371 ==
Louisiana Highway 371
- Location: Evangeline Parish
- Length: 10.380 mi (16.705 km)
- Existed: 1955–1994

Louisiana Highway 371 (LA 371) ran 10.38 miles (16.70 km) in a general north–south direction from US 190 in Basile to LA 104 northeast of Basile.

The route was renumbered in 1994 from its original designation to LA 3277 to prevent a numerical duplication with the newly commissioned US 371.

== Louisiana Highway 372 ==
Louisiana Highway 372
- Location: Bond–Oakdale
- Length: 8.95 mi (14.40 km)

Louisiana Highway 372 (LA 372) runs 8.95 miles (14.40 km) from Bond to Oakdale.

== Louisiana Highway 374 ==
Louisiana Highway 374
- Location: Evangeline Parish
- Length: 9.97 mi (16.05 km)

Louisiana Highway 374 (LA 374) runs 9.97 miles (16.05 km) in Evangeline Parish.

== Louisiana Highway 376 ==
Louisiana Highway 376
- Location: Evangeline Parish
- Length: 19.10 mi (30.74 km)

Louisiana Highway 376 (LA 376) runs 19.10 miles (30.74 km) in Evangeline Parish.

== Louisiana Highway 377 ==
Louisiana Highway 377
- Location: Grant–Pitkin
- Length: 14.12 mi (22.72 km)

Louisiana Highway 377 (LA 377) runs 14.12 miles (22.72 km) from Grant to Pitkin.

== Louisiana Highway 378 ==
Louisiana Highway 378
- Location: Westlake–Moss Bluff
- Length: 7.96 mi (12.81 km)
- Existed: 1955–present

Louisiana Highway 378 (LA 378) runs 7.96 miles (12.81 km) in a southwest to northeast direction from I-10 in Westlake to US 171 in Moss Bluff, Calcasieu Parish. The route has a spur that travels 0.94 miles (1.51 km) along Sam Houston Jones Parkway to Sutherland Road in Sam Houston Jones State Park.

The route heads north from exit 27 on I-10 and travels along Sampson Street, an undivided four-lane highway with a center turning lane, through the city of Westlake. North of town, LA 378 narrows to two lanes and makes a zigzag east onto Phillips Road and north onto Davis Road to cross a vertical lift bridge over the West Fork of the Calcasieu River. Curving due east onto Sam Houston Jones Parkway, the route again widens to four lanes with a center lane and intersects LA 378 Spur, which provides access to Sam Houston Jones State Park. LA 378 continues east to its terminus at US 171 in the unincorporated community of Moss Bluff.

The entire highway is in Calcasieu Parish.

Location	mi	km	Destinations	Notes
Westlake	0.0	0.0	To I-10 / US 90 – Lake Charles, Beaumont	Exit 27 on I-10
Westlake	0.4	0.64	LA 379 (Sulphur Avenue)	
	4.6– 4.8	7.4– 7.7	Bridge over West Fork Calcasieu River	
	5.1	8.2	LA 378 Spur (Sam Houston Jones Parkway)	Eastern terminus of LA 378 Spur; to Sam Houston Jones State Park
Moss Bluff	8.0	12.9	US 171 to I-10 – Lake Charles, DeRidder	
1.000 mi = 1.609 km; 1.000 km = 0.621 mi

== Louisiana Highway 379 ==
Louisiana Highway 379
- Location: Westlake
- Length: 8.01 mi (12.89 km)

Louisiana Highway 379 (LA 379) runs 8.01 miles (12.89 km) in Westlake.

== Louisiana Highway 380 ==
Louisiana Highway 380
- Location: Thornwell–Lake Arthur
- Length: 9.89 mi (15.92 km)
- Existed: 1955–present

Louisiana Highway 380 (LA 380) runs 9.89 miles (15.92 km) in an east–west direction from LA 99 south of Welsh to LA 26 in Lake Arthur, Jefferson Davis Parish.

== Louisiana Highway 382 ==
Louisiana Highway 382
- Location: Jefferson Davis Parish
- Length: 9.38 mi (15.10 km)
- Existed: 1955–present

Louisiana Highway 382 (LA 382) runs 9.38 miles (15.10 km) in a north–south direction from LA 380 east of Thornwell to US 90 east of Welsh, Jefferson Davis Parish.

== Louisiana Highway 383 ==
Louisiana Highway 383
- Location: Iowa–Kinder
- Length: 25.69 mi (41.34 km)

Louisiana Highway 383 (LA 383) runs 25.69 miles (41.34 km) from Iowa to Kinder.

== Louisiana Highway 384 ==
Louisiana Highway 384
- Location: Cameron Prairie NWR–Lake Charles
- Length: 34.33 mi (55.25 km)

Louisiana Highway 384 (LA 384) runs 34.33 miles (55.25 km) from Cameron Prairie NWR to Lake Charles.

== Louisiana Highway 385 ==
Louisiana Highway 385
- Location: Cameron Parish–Lake Charles
- Length: 14.91 mi (24.00 km)

Louisiana Highway 385 (LA 385) runs 14.91 miles (24.00 km) from Cameron Parish to Lake Charles.

== Louisiana Highway 386 ==
Louisiana Highway 386
- Location: Iberville Parish
- Length: 4.71 mi (7.58 km)

Louisiana Highway 386 (LA 386) runs 4.71 miles (7.58 km) in Iberville Parish.

== Louisiana Highway 387 ==
Louisiana Highway 387
- Location: Belle Chasse
- Length: 2.5 mi (4.0 km)
- Existed: 1955–c. 1960

Louisiana Highway 387 (LA 387) was a state highway that served Plaquemines Parish. It spanned 2.5 miles (4.0 km) in a south to north direction along the west bank of the Mississippi River in Belle Chasse.

== Louisiana Highway 389 ==
Louisiana Highway 389
- Location: DeQuincy–Merryville
- Length: 38.25 mi (61.56 km)

Louisiana Highway 389 (LA 389) runs 38.25 miles (61.56 km) from DeQuincy to Merryville.

== Louisiana Highway 390 ==
Louisiana Highway 390
- Location: Hackberry
- Length: 2.77 mi (4.46 km)
- Existed: 1955–present

Louisiana Highway 390 (LA 390) runs 2.77 miles (4.46 km) in an east–west direction along West Main Street from Maggie Hebert Road (PR 656/685), a local road, to LA 27 in Hackberry, Cameron Parish.

== Louisiana Highway 392 ==
Louisiana Highway 392
- Location: South Toledo Bend State Park–Hornbeck
- Length: 21.73 mi (34.97 km)

Louisiana Highway 392 (LA 392) runs 21.73 miles (34.97 km) from South Toledo Bend State Park to Hornbeck.

== Louisiana Highway 394 ==
Louisiana Highway 394
- Location: DeRidder–Dry Creek
- Length: 15.69 mi (25.25 km)

Louisiana Highway 394 (LA 394) runs 15.69 miles (25.25 km) from DeRidder to Dry Creek.

== Louisiana Highway 395 ==
Louisiana Highway 395
- Location: Roanoke–Elton
- Length: 19.56 mi (31.48 km)

Louisiana Highway 395 (LA 395) runs 19.56 miles (31.48 km) from Roanoke to Elton.

== Louisiana Highway 397 ==
Louisiana Highway 397
- Location: Calcasieu Parish
- Length: 19.37 mi (31.17 km)

Louisiana Highway 397 (LA 397) runs 19.37 miles (31.17 km) in Calcasieu Parish.

== Louisiana Highway 398 ==
Louisiana Highway 398
- Location: Assumption Parish–Labadieville
- Length: 10.42 mi (16.77 km)

Louisiana Highway 398 (LA 398) runs 10.42 miles (16.77 km) from Assumption Parish to Labadieville.

== Louisiana Highway 399 ==
Louisiana Highway 399
- Location: Beauregard Parish–Fullerton Lake
- Length: 15.54 mi (25.01 km)
- Existed: 1955–present

Louisiana Highway 399 (LA 399) runs 15.54 miles (25.01 km) in a north–south direction from LA 112 northwest of Sugartown, Beauregard Parish to a local road north of Fullerton, Vernon Parish.

The route heads north from LA 112 and crosses from Beauregard Parish into Vernon Parish. It then curves to the northeast for 6.9 miles (11.1 km) to an intersection with LA 10 at Cravens. LA 399 turns east to follow LA 10 briefly before resuming a northeastern course to Fullerton. Here it intersects LA 458 and turns north to continue the route of that highway past Fullerton Lake to the end of state maintenance at Lookout Road, a local road. The northernmost section of the route is located within the Vernon Unit of the Kisatchie National Forest. LA 112 is an undivided two-lane highway for its entire length.
