= Louisiana Highway 31 =

State highway in Louisiana, United States

Louisiana Highway 31

Route information
- Maintained by Louisiana DOTD
- Length: 54.6 mi (87.9 km)
- Existed: 1955 renumbering–present

Major junctions
- South end: LA 182 in New Iberia
- I-49 / US 167 in Opelousas
- North end: LA 182 in Opelousas

Location
- Country: United States
- State: Louisiana
- Parishes: Iberia, St. Martin, St. Landry

Highway system
- Louisiana State Highway System; Interstate; US; State; Scenic
← LA 30	→ LA 32

Louisiana Highway 31 (LA 31) is a 54.6-mile-long (87.9 km) north–south state highway in Louisiana that serves Iberia, St. Martin, and St. Landry parishes, extending from LA 182 in New Iberia, and ending at the same highway in Opelousas.

== Route description ==
From the south, LA 31 begins at a junction with LA 182 in New Iberia. After a short distance, the route begins to travel along the west bank of Bayou Teche. LA 31 crosses from Iberia Parish into St. Martin Parish near a junction with LA 86. Passing through the historic town of St. Martinville, LA 31 briefly overlaps LA 96. Continuing northward, LA 31 makes a jog in the tiny community of Parks and follows a western bend in Bayou Teche. In the town of Breaux Bridge, LA 31 makes another jog and crosses LA 94. At the north end of town, the highway crosses but does intersect I-10, the main highway across southern Louisiana. Access to the interstate is instead provided by LA 328 on the opposite bank of Bayou Teche.

LA 31 continues to meander along several bends in the bayou, passing opposite Cecilia en route to Arnaudville. Here, the highway intersects the eastern terminus of LA 93, connecting with nearby I-49. Immediately afterward, LA 31 switches to the opposite bank of Bayou Teche and proceeds northwest to Leonville, where it intersects LA 103. A few miles later, LA 31 leaves the path of Bayou Teche and eventually comes to a T-intersection with LA 742. The highway turns due west, enters the city limits of Opelousas, and passes through a diamond interchange with I-49. LA 31 proceeds on Creswell Lane a short distance further to its junction with LA 182 a few blocks south of the downtown area.

== Major intersections ==
Parish	Location	mi	km	Destinations	Notes
Iberia	New Iberia	0.0	0.0	LA 182 (West St. Peter Street, West Main Street) – Jeanerette, Lafayette	Southern terminus; one-way pair
Iberia	New Iberia	0.6	0.97	LA 677 (North Landry Drive)	
Iberia		2.6	4.2	LA 86 – Loreauville, Lake Dauterive	Northern terminus of LA 86
St. Martin	Cinco	6.7	10.8	LA 92-1 (Smede Highway) – Cade	
St. Martin	St. Martinville	8.6	13.8	LA 96 west (Port Street) – Broussard, Lafayette	Southern end of LA 96 concurrency
St. Martin	St. Martinville	8.7	14.0	LA 96 east (Bridge Street)	Northern end of LA 96 concurrency
St. Martin	St. Martinville	10.0	16.1	LA 353 (Cypress Island Highway) – Cypress Island	Eastern terminus of LA 353
St. Martin	Parks	15.2	24.5	LA 350 (Bridge Street)	Western terminus of LA 350
St. Martin	Ruth	19.0	30.6	LA 351	Western terminus of LA 351
St. Martin	Breaux Bridge	21.9	35.2	LA 336-1 east (East Bridge Street) to I-10 – Cecilia	Southern end of LA 336-1 concurrency
St. Martin	Breaux Bridge	22.0	35.4	LA 336-1 west (West Bridge Street)	Northern end of LA 336-1 concurrency
St. Martin	Breaux Bridge	22.9	36.9	LA 94 (Mills Avenue) – Cecilia, Lafayette	
St. Martin		27.4	44.1	LA 341 (DeClouet Highway)	Southern terminus of LA 341
St. Martin	Cecilia	30.7	49.4	LA 355 (Cecilia Bridge Highway) – Cecilia	Western terminus of LA 355
St. Martin		33.3	53.6	LA 354 (DeClouet Highway)	Northern terminus of LA 354
St. Martin	Arnaudville	37.2	59.9	LA 93 (Courtableau Street) – Sunset	Northern terminus of LA 93
St. Landry	Arnaudville	37.3	60.0	LA 347 north (Fuselier Street)	Southern end of LA 347 concurrency
St. Landry	Arnaudville	37.4	60.2	Bridge over Bayou Teche	
St. Landry	Arnaudville	37.4	60.2	LA 347 south (Fuselier Street)	Northern end of LA 347 concurrency
St. Landry		43.1	69.4	LA 741 – Krotz Springs, Baton Rouge	Southern terminus of LA 741
St. Landry	Leonville	45.0	72.4	LA 103 – Port Barre	Southern terminus of LA 103
St. Landry	Leonville	45.1	72.6	Bridge over Bayou Teche	
St. Landry	Leonville	45.3	72.9	LA 347 / LA 3254	Northern terminus of LA 347; western terminus of LA 3254
St. Landry		52.3	84.2	LA 742 – Port Barre	Western terminus of LA 742
St. Landry	Opelousas	53.7	86.4	I-49 / US 167 – Lafayette, Alexandria	Exit 18 on I-49/US 167
St. Landry	Opelousas	54.6	87.9	LA 182 (South Union Street)	Northern terminus
1.000 mi = 1.609 km; 1.000 km = 0.621 mi: Concurrency terminus
