= Cade, Louisiana =

- Census-designated place
- Interactive map of Cade, Louisiana
- Country: United States
- State: Louisiana
- Parish: St. Martin

Area
  - Total: 6.72 sq mi (17.40 km^{2})
  - Land: 6.72 sq mi (17.40 km^{2})
  - Water: 0 sq mi (0.00 km^{2})

Population (2020)
  - Total: 1,874
  - Density: 279.0/sq mi (107.72/km^{2})
- Time zone: UTC-6 (CST)
  - Summer (DST): UTC-5 (CDT)
- Area code: 337
- FIPS code: 22-11580

Cade is a census-designated place (CDP) in St. Martin Parish, Louisiana, United States. As of the 2020 census, Cade had a population of 1,874. The community is served by a single ZIP code: 70519.

The community was founded and named after Captain Cade, who was the long time sheriff of New Iberia. It is now home to the Episcopal School of Acadiana, Bruce Foods, Spanish Trail Golf Course, and The Pines Ranch (Louisiana's first organic ranch). In contrast with many rural communities, Cade does not have a police station, or health center. The crime and unemployment rate are low in Cade compared to the U.S. average.

== Geography ==
The community of Cade, located in southwestern St. Martin Parish, is situated at Louisiana highways 182 and 92-1. To the northwest on LA-182 are the Lafayette Parish cities of Broussard, 6 miles (9.7 km), and Lafayette, 13 miles (21 km), the parish seat, and 8 miles (13 km) to the southeast is New Iberia, the seat of Iberia Parish. Louisiana Highway 92-1 heads west 7 miles (11 km) to the city of Youngsville and 6 miles (9.7 km) northeast to St. Martinville, the St. Martin Parish seat in which LA-92-1 heads east 4 miles to intersect with Louisiana Highway 31 and heads 2 miles north to the St. Martinville.

== Demographics ==
Historical population
| Census | Pop. | Note | %± |
|---|---|---|---|
| 2010 | 1,723 | | — |
| 2020 | 1,874 | | 8.8% |
U.S. Decennial Census

Cade first appeared as a census designated place in the 2010 U.S. census.

The 2019 American Community Survey estimated 1,655 people lived in the community. The racial and ethnic makeup of the census-designated place was 68.2% non-Hispanic white, 24.8% Black and African American, 1.0% Asian, and 6.0% multiracial. The median age was 38.2, and the median household income was $53,250; males had a median income of $53,639 versus $30,714 for females. An estimated 10.2% of the population lived at or below the poverty line.
