= Nina Station, Louisiana =

Unincorporated community in Louisiana, U.S.

Coordinates: 30°18′19″N 91°50′28″W

Nina Station (French: Station-de-Nina) is an unincorporated community in St. Martin Parish, Louisiana, United States. It lies at an elevation of 20 feet (6 m).
