= Louisiana Highway 94 =

Highway in Louisiana, United States

Louisiana Highway 94

- Route of LA 94 highlighted in red

Route information
- Maintained by Louisiana DOTD
- Length: 8.003 mi (12.880 km)
- Existed: 1955 renumbering–present

Major junctions
- West end: Future I-49 / US 90 / US 167 in Lafayette
- LA 31 in Breaux Bridge
- East end: LA 328 in Breaux Bridge

Location
- Country: United States
- State: Louisiana
- Parishes: Lafayette, St. Martin

Highway system
- Louisiana State Highway System; Interstate; US; State; Scenic
← LA 93	→ LA 95

Louisiana Highway 94 (LA 94) is a state highway located in southern Louisiana. It runs 8.00 miles (12.87 km) in an east–west direction from the junction of U.S. Highway 90 (US 90) and U.S. Highway 167 (US 167) in Lafayette to LA 328 in Breaux Bridge.

The highway connects Lafayette, the parish seat and the largest city in Lafayette Parish, with the small city of Breaux Bridge in neighboring St. Martin Parish. The entire route parallels Interstate 10 (I-10), which is located an average of about 1.5 miles (2.4 km) to the north and continues eastward toward Baton Rouge, the state capital. LA 94 is also signed as an alternate route to I-10 when the interstate is closed due to traffic accidents or construction work. Though it is a distinct east–west route, the signage for LA 94 carries no directional banners.

== Route description ==
From the west, LA 94 begins at an intersection with the Evangeline Thruway, a couplet of one-way streets that carries both US 90 and US 167 in Lafayette. US 90 and US 167 travel north from this intersection toward an interchange with I-10 and I-49, the latter connecting to Opelousas. On the south side, US 90 heads alone on Evangeline Thruway toward New Iberia as US 167 turns southwest onto Johnston Street toward Abbeville. Directly opposite Johnston Street, LA 94 proceeds northeast on Louisiana Avenue as an undivided four-lane highway. The route travels through a largely residential neighborhood, crossing East Simcoe Street and Mudd Avenue.

Shortly afterward, LA 94 turns east onto Carmel Drive opposite the Lafayette City Park, becoming an undivided two-lane highway. (Westbound traffic from Breaux Bridge following the I-10 alternate route is directed to turn north from Carmel Drive onto Louisiana Avenue to rejoin the interstate.) After crossing East Pinhook Road, the roadway widens to accommodate a center turning lane and crosses out of the Lafayette city limits. It then curves to the northeast and intersects LA 353 (Lake Martin Road), which heads southeast toward Lake Martin and Cypress Island. Narrowing again to two lanes, LA 94 continues northeast for 1.0 mile (1.6 km) where it crosses a bridge over Bayou Tortue and enters St. Martin Parish.

LA 94 heads northeast through rural St. Martin Parish for 2.6 miles (4.2 km) before entering the city of Breaux Bridge, where it becomes known as West Mills Avenue. The surroundings remain largely rural, transitioning to scattered light industrial and commercial services after the route cross the Louisiana and Delta Railroad (LDRR) line. The center turning lane reappears, and the highway crosses a second railroad line at grade. LA 94 then intersects LA 31 (Berard Street), which parallels the west bank of Bayou Teche. LA 31 serves as the principal north–south highway of St. Martin Parish and connects to St. Martinville, the parish seat. LA 94 proceeds northeast, crossing a bridge over the bayou, and ends shortly afterward at an intersection with LA 328 (Rees Street). LA 328 parallels the east bank of Bayou Teche and connects to I-10 and the community of Cecilia to the north.

The route is classified as an urban principal arterial by the Louisiana Department of Transportation and Development (La DOTD). The average daily traffic volume in 2013 is reported as between 12,100 and 14,300 vehicles for the majority of the route. The section along Carmel Drive within the Lafayette city limits has a higher average of 19,700 while an adjoining section on Louisiana Avenue has an anomalously low count of 6,300. The route has a posted speed limit of 35 mph (55 km/h) in Lafayette, increasing to 45 mph (70 km/h) at the city limits. The speed limit is 55 mph (90 km/h) through most of St. Martin Parish, decreasing to 40 miles per hour (65 km/h) as it approaches LA 31.

== History ==
In the original Louisiana Highway system in use between 1921 and 1955, the modern LA 94 made up the northern portion of State Route 43. As originally designated in 1921, Route 43 continued southward along the present route of US 167 from Lafayette to Abbeville. Five years later, the route was extended to the Gulf Intracoastal Waterway south of Abbeville. The entire section of Route 43 between Lafayette and Abbeville became co-signed with US 167 in 1949 when that highway was extended south from Alexandria over existing state highways.

LA 94 was created with the 1955 Louisiana Highway renumbering following the former State Route 43 from Lafayette eastward to Breaux Bridge.

La 94—From a junction with La-US 167 at or near Lafayette to a junction with La 31 at or near Breaux Bridge.

— 1955 legislative route description

Lengthy route concurrencies were eliminated in the renumbering, and the Lafayette–Abbeville highway was retained as US 167 only. The portion of former Route 43 from Abbeville south to Esther became part of LA 82. The remainder of the route south to the Intracoastal Waterway was designated as LA 333.

=== Alignment changes ===
Since its creation, LA 94 has seen only minor changes affecting its western and eastern ends. The original western terminus in Lafayette was located at the present junction of US 90 (Cameron Street) and US 90 Business/LA 182 (University Avenue). At the time, US 90 turned south at this intersection and followed the current business route through the downtown area. LA 94 followed the current route of US 90 east along Cameron Street. It then made zigzag south onto St. John Street and east onto Simcoe Street, crossing what later became the Evangeline Thruway and joining the present alignment at Louisiana Avenue.

Around 1964, US 90 and US 167 were relocated onto the Evangeline Thruway, and the western terminus of LA 94 was truncated to the intersection of Evangeline Thruway and East Simcoe Street. The section of LA 94 that became US 90 was streamlined in the early 1970s with Cameron Street now transitioning onto Mudd Avenue, two blocks north of Simcoe Street, to reach Evangeline Thruway. However, LA 94 was not relocated onto Mudd Avenue east of Evangeline Thruway, creating a jog in the state-maintained connection between US 90 west and LA 94 east.

More recently, East Simcoe Street was returned to local control, and the western terminus of LA 94 was moved again to its present location. LA 94 now follows Louisiana Avenue directly from Evangeline Thruway across East Simcoe Street. This route was formerly LA 3138, a short connector added in the late 1970s providing a direct state-maintained connection between LA 94 and US 167 south.

In Breaux Bridge, the eastern terminus of LA 94 was originally located at LA 31 on the west bank of Bayou Teche. Motorists wishing to cross the bayou had to turn southeast onto LA 31 and utilize the nearby bridge crossing on either LA 336-1 or LA 336-2. In the early 1980s, a new bridge was constructed across Bayou Teche, allowing the direct extension of LA 94 to LA 328, its current eastern terminus.

== Major intersections ==
Parish	Location	mi	km	Destinations	Notes
Lafayette	Lafayette	0.000	0.000	US 90 / US 167 north (Evangeline Thruway) to I-10 / I-49 – Opelousas, New Iberia US 167 south (Johnston Street) – Abbeville	Western terminus; one-way pair on Evangeline Thruway
Lafayette	Lafayette	0.846	1.362	Louisiana Avenue to I-10 / I-49	Signed westbound to direct traffic following I-10 Alternate Route
Lafayette		2.302	3.705	LA 353 (Lake Martin Road) – Lake Martin, Cypress Island	Northern terminus of LA 353
St. Martin	Breaux Bridge	7.391– 7.435	11.895– 11.965	LA 31 (Berard Street) – Breaux Bridge	
St. Martin	Breaux Bridge	8.003	12.880	LA 328 (Rees Street) to I-10 – Cecilia	Eastern terminus
1.000 mi = 1.609 km; 1.000 km = 0.621 mi
