= Gecko, Louisiana =

Unincorporated community in Louisiana

- Unincorporated community
- Location within Louisiana Location within the United States
- Coordinates: 30°17′45″N 91°56′06″W
- Country: United States
- State: Louisiana
- Parish: St. Martin
- Elevation: 13 ft (4.0 m)
- Time zone: UTC-6 (Central (CST))
  - Summer (DST): UTC-5 (CDT)
- Area code: 337
- GNIS feature ID: 560823

Gecko is an unincorporated community in St. Martin Parish, Louisiana, United States. The community is located less than 2 miles (3.2 kilometres) northwest of Breaux Bridge and 5 miles (8.0 kilometres) southwest of Cecilia on the bank of Bayou Teche.
