= Ruth, Louisiana =

Unincorporated community in Louisiana, U.S.

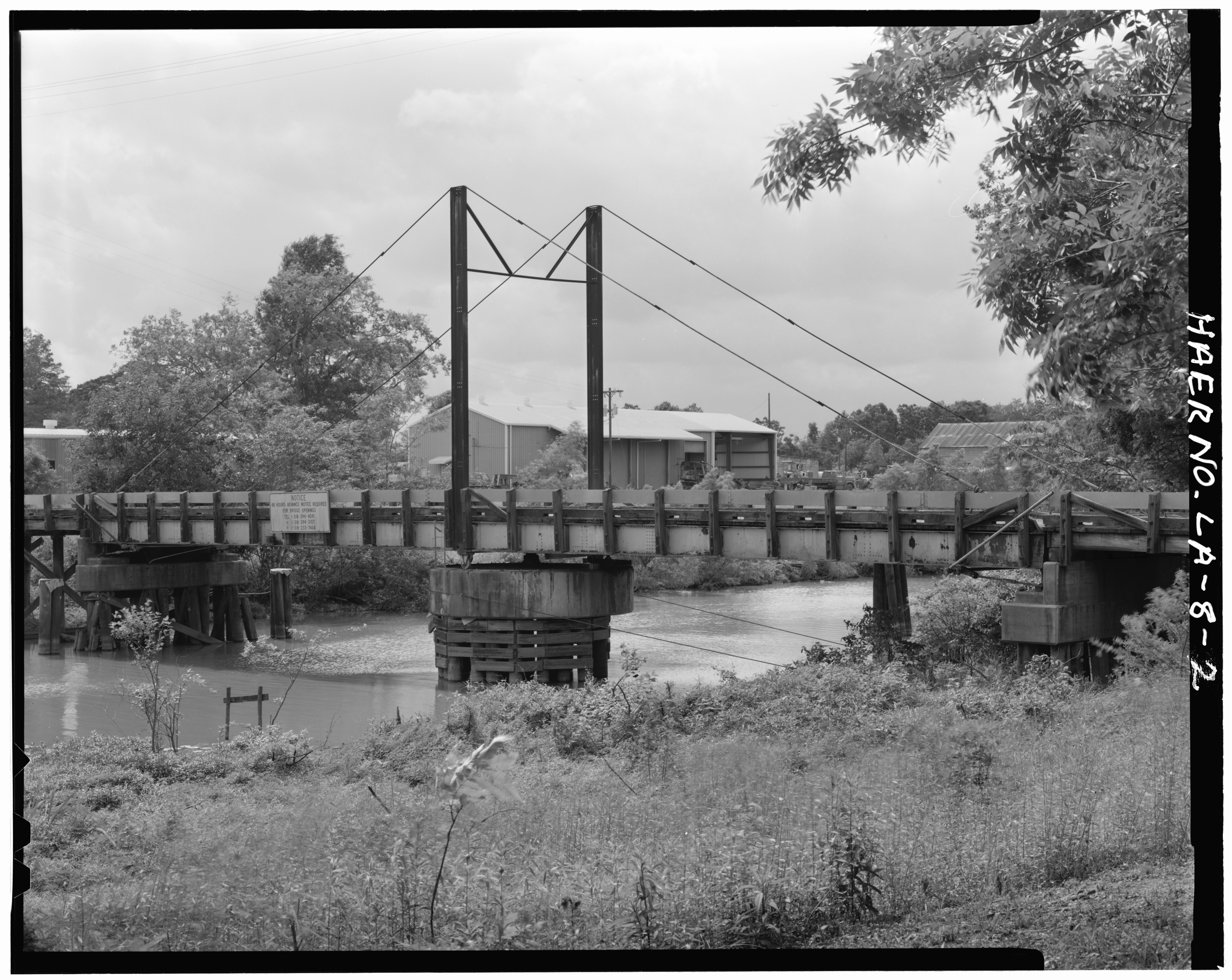
Bridge, Ruth Louisiana

Ruth is an unincorporated community and locality in St. Martin Parish, Louisiana, United States. The community is located at 30.238°N 91.882°W.

The village is 8.3 miles (13.4 km) east of Lafayette on the Bayou Teche and the Louisiana Highway 351.
