= Catahoula, Louisiana =

Coordinates: 30°12′53″N 91°42′32″W

- Census-designated place
- Interactive map of Catahoula, Louisiana
- Country: United States
- State: Louisiana
- Parish: St. Martin

Area
  - Total: 3.20 sq mi (8.29 km^{2})
  - Land: 3.06 sq mi (7.93 km^{2})
  - Water: 0.14 sq mi (0.35 km^{2})

Population (2020)
  - Total: 988
  - Density: 322.7/sq mi (124.58/km^{2})
- Time zone: UTC-6 (CST)
  - Summer (DST): UTC-5 (CDT)
- Area code: 337
- FIPS code: 22-13330

Catahoula is a census-designated place in St. Martin Parish, Louisiana, United States. It is located outside the western boundary of the Atchafalaya River Basin, south of the town of Henderson. As of the 2020 census, Catahoula had a population of 988.

== Demographics ==
Historical population
Census	Pop.	Note	%±
2010	1,094		—
2020	988		−9.7%
U.S. Decennial Census

Catahoula first appeared as a census designated place in the 2010 U.S. census.

The 2019 census estimates determined 1,054 people lived in Catahoula, spread over a total area of 3.1 square miles (8.0 km^{2}). The racial and ethnic makeup of the census-designated place was 99.1% non-Hispanic white, and 0.9% Asian. The median age was 38.4 and 19.7% spoke another language other than English at home. The median household income was $52,417 and 11.5% of the population lived at or below the poverty line.
