= Lake Fausse Pointe State Park =

State park in Louisiana, United States

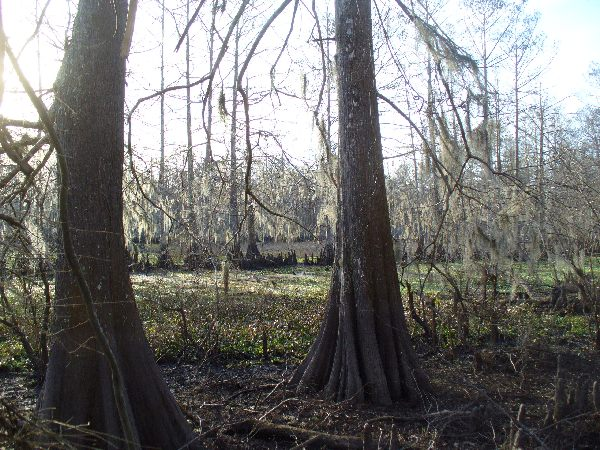

- Location within Louisiana
- Location: St. Martin Parish, Louisiana, United States of America
- Coordinates: 30°02′09″N 91°35′54″W
- Area: 6,000 acres (24 km^{2}; 9.4 sq mi)
- Visitors: 28,555 (in 2022)
- Governing body: Louisiana Office of State Parks

Lake Fausse Pointe State Park is located in Iberia Parish, Louisiana and St. Martin Parish, Louisiana, USA. It is located about 18 miles (29 km) east of St. Martinville adjacent to the Atchafalaya Basin. The park is 6,000 acres (2,400 ha) in size and was once the home of the Chitimacha Indians.

== Features ==
Lake Fausse Pointe State Park offers a boat launch, playground, splash park, picnic area and pavilions, restrooms, nature trails and canoe trails. Overnight facilities include primitive hike-to and canoe-to campsites, 50 RV campsites, and 18 furnished cabins (10 facing a cove, 8 facing a swamp). The park is home to a number of wild animal species, including whitetail deer, raccoons, black bears, cottonmouth snakes (Agkistrodon piscivorus), armadillos, alligators and bobcats. An interpretive center provides information and exhibits specific to the plants and animals found in the park. Also at the interpretive center is a boat launch and dock for canoes and other small boats. Dock typically houses rental boats, but generally will have space for canoe campers looking for a place to load up and ship out. All canoe campsite distances shown below are distances from the interpretive center.

There are three hiking trails that also allow biking:

- Trail A, Armadillo Ridge, is 0.75 miles (1.21 km) and takes about 15 minutes to hike. This hike is "easy strolling".
- Trail B, Cardinal Run, is 1.6 miles (2.6 km) and includes a scenic overlook onto Lake Fausse Pointe. It takes about 30 minutes to hike and has a footbridge along a slough and swamp.
- Trail C, Barred Owl Trek, is 3.3 miles (5.3 km) and follows the perimeter of the park. It takes about 2–2.5 hours to hike or 30 minutes to bicycle. This trail has many footbridges over the wettest areas.

There are also numerous canoe trails which follow well marked waterways and include access to several primitive canoe only campsites.

In 1999, the Louisiana Department of Culture, Recreation and Tourism named the main road and conference center at the park in honor of the late State Representative Bo Ackal of New Iberia.

== Backpack campsites ==
The eight primitive campsites are all found along Trail C. Green markers lead to the backpack sites.

- Backpack Site #1 (BPS#1): Near the main trail and next to a slough. Has a bench-table and fire ring. Approx. 0.3 miles (0.48 km) from trail head.
- Backpack Site #2 (BPS#2): About 100 yds from the main trail. Under a group of hackberry trees. Has a bench-table and fire ring. Approx. 0.4 miles (0.64 km) from trail head.
- Backpack Site #3 (BPS#3): About 300 yds from the main trail. Under a large elm tree next to a pretty black water slough. Has a bench-table and a fire ring. Trail B is on the opposite side of the slough. Paddling to this site is possible but often challenging due to seasonal aquatic growth (check with interpretive ranger before planning a canoe trip). Approx. 0.5 miles (0.80 km) from trail head.
- Backpack Site #4 (BPS#4): About 50 yds from the main trail. Site is in the interior of the swamp and is 1.6 miles (2.6 km) down trail. Has a bench-table, primitive bench and fire ring. Approx. 1.0 mile (1.6 km) from trail head.
- Backpack Site #5 (BPS#5): About 300 yds from the main trail; on a canal. Can be reached by hiking, biking or canoe. Has primitive benches and a fire ring. Approx. 2.3 miles (3.7 km) from trail head. Note: this is NOT CANOE CAMPSITE #5 (Pack or Paddle).
- Backpack Site #6 (BPS#6): About 75 yds from the main trail. Can be reached by hiking, biking or canoe (see interpretive ranger for more information on canoeing). Has primitive bench and fire ring. Approx. 2.0 miles (3.2 km) from trail head.
- Backpack Site #7 (BPS#7): Half a mile from the main trail. Is in the interior of the swamp. Has 3 fire rings. FOR SERIOUS HIKERS who enjoy seclusion and rough trail. By permit only! Approx. 2.5 miles (4.0 km) from trail head.

Note that BPS#5, 6 & 7 can be more quickly reached from the Cove Cabins (Cabins 9-18).

== Canoe campsites ==
- Canoe Site #1, Twin Ponds (CCS#1): Has an open dock, table, tent pad and fire ring. It has a large pond on the front and a marsh on the back side. Off of the GREEN canoe trail - approx. 1.8 miles (2.9 km) from Interpretive Center to Site.
- Canoe Site #2, Ceabon Canal (CCS#2): Has a dock, table and fire ring. It is a small area. Off of the RED canoe trail - approx. 2.3 miles (3.7 km).
- Canoe Site #3, South Pass (CCS#3): Has a dock, table and fire ring. Near the intersection of ORANGE and RED canoe trails - approx. 3.3 miles (5.3 km). Note: Boats from the north (coon slough) should be aware of shallow water. Check with interpretive ranger for water levels & alternate routes.
- Canoe Site #4, Highland Waters (CCS#4): Has a large dock with two tables and two fire rings. Excellent site for campers who enjoy being on an island by the lake under large live oaks. Off of the ORANGE canoe trail - approx. 1.0 mile (1.6 km). Note: Boats coming from the north (coon slough) should be aware of shallow water. Check with interpretive ranger for water levels & alternate routes.
- Canoe Site #5, Pack or Paddle (CCS#5): Has a dock, table, tent pad and three fire rings. Off of the BLUE canoe trail - approx. 2.3 miles (3.7 km). Also, site can be accessed via Trail C - is approx. 1.3 miles (2.1 km) from trail head. Note: this is NOT BACKPACK SITE #5.
