= Coteau Holmes, Louisiana =

Coordinates: 30°07′48″N 91°43′34″W

Coteau Holmes
- Unincorporated community
- Interactive map of Coteau Holmes
- Country: United States
- State: Louisiana
- Parish: St. Martin
- Time zone: UTC-6 (CST)
  - Summer (DST): UTC-5 (CDT)
- Area code: 337

Coteau Holmes is an unincorporated community in St. Martin Parish, in the U.S. state of Louisiana. LA 679 passes through the community. The nearest major town is Loreauville. It is part of the Lafayette Metropolitan Statistical Area.
