= Billeaud, Louisiana =

Unincorporated community in Louisiana, U.S.

Coordinates: 30°08′09″N 91°56′44″W

Billeaud is an unincorporated community in Lafayette Parish, Louisiana, United States.

The community is located near the intersection of US 90 and LA Hwy 182.

== History ==
The town is named after Martial Billeaud, who in 1889 converted his horse powered syrup mill into a steam powered sugar factory. The new factory was constructed at a cost of $50,000 and had a daily capacity of four hundred tons of cane. Area sugar planters had a local mill for their product. The Billeaud Sugar Mill brought a tremendous wave of prosperity to Broussard, which coincided with the previously mentioned sugar boom in southern Louisiana as a whole.

== Attractions ==
The Billeaud House comes from the Billeaud Sugar Plantation. It was built prior to the American Civil War. Today it is used as a spinning and weaving cottage. One of the looms is a 150-year-old original. The other is a replica, built locally by 72-year-old Mr. Whitney Breaux for the Bicentennial of Louisiana. Homespun blankets and clothes were woven from white cotton, native to Louisiana, and brown cotton introduced from Mexico to the Acadians by the Spaniards.
