= Parks, Louisiana =

Parks, Louisiana La Pointe de Repose
- Village
- Village of Parks
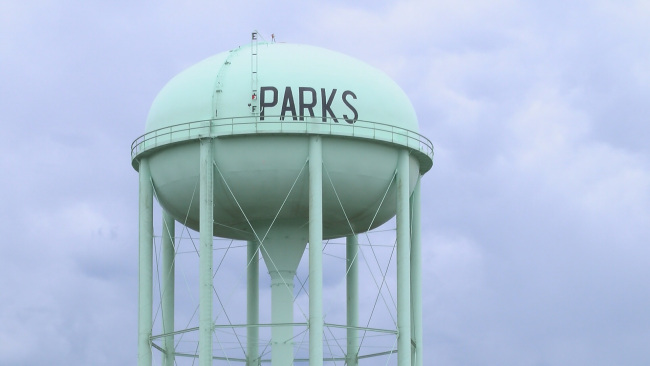
- Parks water tower
- Nickname: Potier
- Location of Parks in St. Martin Parish, Louisiana.

- Location of Parks in Louisiana
- Coordinates: 30°12′N 91°49′W
- Country: United States
- State: Louisiana
- Parish: St.Martin
- Founded: 1765
- Renamed: 1908
- Founder: Paul Melancon

Government
  - Mayor: Kevin J. Kately (D)
  - Chief Of Police: Reginald ‘Reggie’ Clues
  - Alderman: Myra Yvonne Narcisse
  - Alderman: Kanisha Potier
  - Alderman: Harold Robertson

Area
  - Total: 0.89 sq mi (2.30 km^{2})
  - Land: 0.85 sq mi (2.19 km^{2})
  - Water: 0.042 sq mi (0.11 km^{2})
- Elevation: 26 ft (7.9 m)

Population (2020)
  - Total: 640
  - Density: 757.4/sq mi (292.43/km^{2})
- Time zone: UTC-6 (CST)
  - Summer (DST): UTC-5 (CDT)
- Postal code: 70582
- Area code: 337
- FIPS code: 22-59165
- Website: villageofparks.municipalimpact.com

Parks is a village in St. Martin Parish, Louisiana, United States. The population was 653 at the 2010 census, and 696 at the 2020 population estimates program. It is part of the Lafayette metropolitan statistical area.

== History ==
The exact origin of the name "Parks" is somewhat of a mystery. Although some residents seem to think that it had something to do with the railroad, one story states the first train to pass through the community arrived on Easter Sunday. When the train engineer, who apparently did not speak or understand French, inquired about the name of the settlement, the residents replied "C'est Pacques" (it's Easter). The train engineer thought he understood the word Parks, and the name apparently stuck.

Parks, originally called Potier, lies in the area previously known as La Pointe District, which existed in 1765. It was also called La Pointe de Repose, supposedly because the cowhands in the early 19th century drove their cattle into the cul-de-sac formed by the sharp bend of the bayou on round up time.

Settlement began in the Parks village shortly after 1900. Around that time, Paul Melancon purchased a large tract of land in the vicinity of what is now Parks in order to establish a cotton farm. But, shortly after buying the property, he decided to divide a portion into town lots and the community took shape. In 1908, the village of 330 acres was incorporated. Since that time, Parks has remained approximately the same size.

== Geography ==
Parks is located at 30°12′56″N 91°49′46″W (30.215675, -91.829472), in the region of Acadiana in southern Louisiana. Highways 31 and 347, which both parallel the Bayou Teche, pass through the village with the cities of Breaux Bridge being located 7 miles (11 km) northwest and St. Martinville, the parish seat, located 7 miles (11 km) to the south. According to the United States Census Bureau, the village has a total area of 0.8 square miles (2.1 km^{2}), all land.

== Demographics ==
Historical population
Census	Pop.	Note	%±
1910	466		—
1920	766		64.4%
1930	409		−46.6%
1940	460		12.5%
1950	460		0.0%
1960	413		−10.2%
1970	491		18.9%
1980	545		11.0%
1990	400		−26.6%
2000	533		33.3%
2010	653		22.5%
2020	640		−2.0%
2025 (est.)	671	▲	4.8%
U.S. Decennial Census

At the 2020 population estimates program, 696 people lived in the village. The 2019 American Community Survey estimated 57.0% of its population were non-Hispanic white, 42.1% Black and African American, and 0.9% multiracial. The median household income was $45,568 and 10.2% of the population lived at or below the poverty line.

At the 2000 United States census, there were 533 people, 207 households, and 150 families residing in the village. The population density was 677.6 inhabitants per square mile (261.6/km^{2}). There were 240 housing units at an average density of 305.1 per square mile (117.8/km^{2}). The racial makeup of the village was 51.97% White, 47.47% African American, 0.38% Native American, and 0.19% from two or more races. Hispanic or Latin Americans of any race were 1.13% of the population.

There were 207 households, out of which 27.1% had children under the age of 18 living with them, 51.2% were married couples living together, 15.5% had a female householder with no husband present, and 27.5% were non-families. 26.1% of all households were made up of individuals, and 12.6% had someone living alone who was 65 years of age or older. The average household size was 2.57 and the average family size was 3.09.

In the village, the population was spread out, with 22.0% under the age of 18, 9.6% from 18 to 24, 26.3% from 25 to 44, 28.3% from 45 to 64, and 13.9% who were 65 years of age or older. The median age was 40 years. For every 100 females, there were 84.4 males. For every 100 females age 18 and over, there were 84.1 males.

The median income for a household in the village was $33,958, and the median income for a family was $36,042. Males had a median income of $30,909 versus $22,500 for females. The per capita income for the village was $16,191. About 13.1% of families and 15.7% of the population were below the poverty line, including 17.6% of those under age 18 and 18.9% of those age 65 or over.

== Education ==
Public schools in St. Martin Parish are operated by the St. Martin Parish School Board. The village of Parks is zoned to Parks Primary School (Grades PK-4), Parks Middle School (Grades 5-8), and Breaux Bridge High School or St. Martinville Senior High School (Grades 9-12).

== Notable people ==
- Fred Mills, Republican member of the Louisiana State Senate
