= Loreauville, Louisiana =

- Village
- Village of Loreauville
- Location of Loreauville in Iberia Parish, Louisiana

- Location of Louisiana in the United States
- Coordinates: 30°03′37″N 91°44′16″W
- Country: United States
- State: Louisiana
- Parish: Iberia

Area
  - Total: 0.45 sq mi (1.17 km^{2})
  - Land: 0.44 sq mi (1.15 km^{2})
  - Water: 0.0077 sq mi (0.02 km^{2})
- Elevation: 20 ft (6.1 m)

Population (2020)
  - Total: 658
  - Density: 1,476.4/sq mi (570.03/km^{2})
- Time zone: UTC-6 (CST)
  - Summer (DST): UTC-5 (CDT)
- ZIP Code: 70552
- Area code: 337
- FIPS code: 22-45670
- GNIS feature ID: 2407493
- Website: www.villageofloreauville.com

Loreauville is a village in Iberia Parish in the U.S. state of Louisiana. The population was 658 (estimated) at the 2020 census, down from 938 at the 2000 census. It is part of the New Iberia micropolitan statistical area, and the Lafayette metropolitan statistical area.

== History ==
Loreauville was initially called "Fausse Pointe", then "Dugasville" after the Dugas family, who opened a trading post at the site. The name was changed to "Picouville" when a Picou family member donated land to build a chapel.

On April 15, 1871, the name was changed from Picouville to Loreauville for Ozaire Loreau, who had contributed the property for the old Catholic church and cemetery, and had also aided in the agricultural, industrial and political growth of the village.

== Geography ==
Loreauville is located in northern Iberia Parish on the east side of Bayou Teche. It is 8 miles (13 km) northeast of New Iberia, the parish seat of Iberia Parish and 9 miles (14 km) southeast of St. Martinville, the parish seat of St. Martin Parish.

According to the United States Census Bureau, the village has a total area of 0.45 square miles (1.2 km^{2}), of which 0.01 square miles (0.03 km^{2}), or 1.45% are water.

=== Hurricanes ===
The following hurricanes have impacted the village of Loreauville:

- 1974 - Hurricane Carmen
- 1992 - The eye of Hurricane Andrew passed directly over Loreauville. The passage of the hurricane caused severe damage to the local infrastructure, and residents were without electric service for over four weeks.
- 2002 - Hurricane Lili
- 2005 - Hurricane Rita
- 2008 - Hurricane Gustav
- 2019 - Hurricane Barry although a weaker hurricane, caused severe damage to electrical power lines and live oak trees
- 2020 - Hurricane Laura

== Demographics ==
Historical population
Census	Pop.	Note	%±
1910	291		—
1920	439		50.9%
1930	441		0.5%
1940	490		11.1%
1950	478		−2.4%
1960	655		37.0%
1970	728		11.1%
1980	860		18.1%
1990	860		0.0%
2000	938		9.1%
2010	887		−5.4%
2020	658		−25.8%
2025 (est.)	642	▼	−2.4%
U.S. Decennial Census

As of the census of 2020, there were 658 people, 341 households, and 231 families living in the village. There were 394 housing units, of which 53, or 13.5%, were vacant. The racial makeup of the village was 76.9% white, 21.9% African American, 0.3% Native American, 0.2% Asian, 0.1% some other race, and 0.6% from two or more races. 1.1% of the population were Hispanic or Latino of any race.

Of the 341 households in the village, 35.2% had children under the age of 18 living with them, 47.2% were headed by married couples living together, 15.0% had a female householder with no husband present, and 32.3% were non-families. 28.7% of all households were made up of individuals, and 12.3% were someone living alone who was 65 years of age or older. The average household size was 2.60, and the average family size was 3.19. 27.1% of residents in the village were under the age of 18, 9.3% were from age 18 to 24, 26.5% were from 25 to 44, 21.1% were from 45 to 64, and 16.0% were 65 years of age or older. The median age was 35.8 years. For every 100 females, there were 96.7 males. For every 100 females age 18 and over, there were 87.5 males.

Additional information is available through the American Community Survey, most recently released for 2012 through 2016. During this period, 63% of all housing units were single-unit structures, 23% were mobile homes, and 14% were multi-unit structures. 13% of the housing units had been built since 1990.

The estimated median annual income for a household in the village during 2012-2016 was $42,625, and for a family was $47,500. Male full-time workers had a median income of $61,094 versus $28,500 for females. The per capita income for the village was $20,733. 27.0% of the population and 18.7% of families were below the poverty line, along with 39.4% of people under the age of 18 and 9.5% of people age 65 and over.

== Culture ==
Sugarcane farming remains is an important activity in the immediate area surrounding the village. Sugarcane harvest time occurs from September to December annually. Many farmers deliver their harvest to local sugar cooperatives with tractor-drawn cane carts. The Louisiana Sugarcane Festival occurs annually in September in the nearby town of New Iberia.

Many of the villages current and former inhabitants are of Cajun heritage, and French is spoken by many families as a second language.

Boat building, in many shapes and forms, is an important cultural activity that has impacted the village of Loreauville. From large shipyards such as Breaux's Bay Craft, Neuville Boat Works, and Breaux Brothers that build aluminum oceangoing work vessels to the traditional wood Cajun pirogue hand-crafted by local residents, boat building and the use of the local waterways such as Bayou Teche and Lake Dauterive have been an important activity for residents since the establishment of the village.

Loreauville has several parades each year, including Mardi Gras, Homecoming Parade, and Christmas Parade.

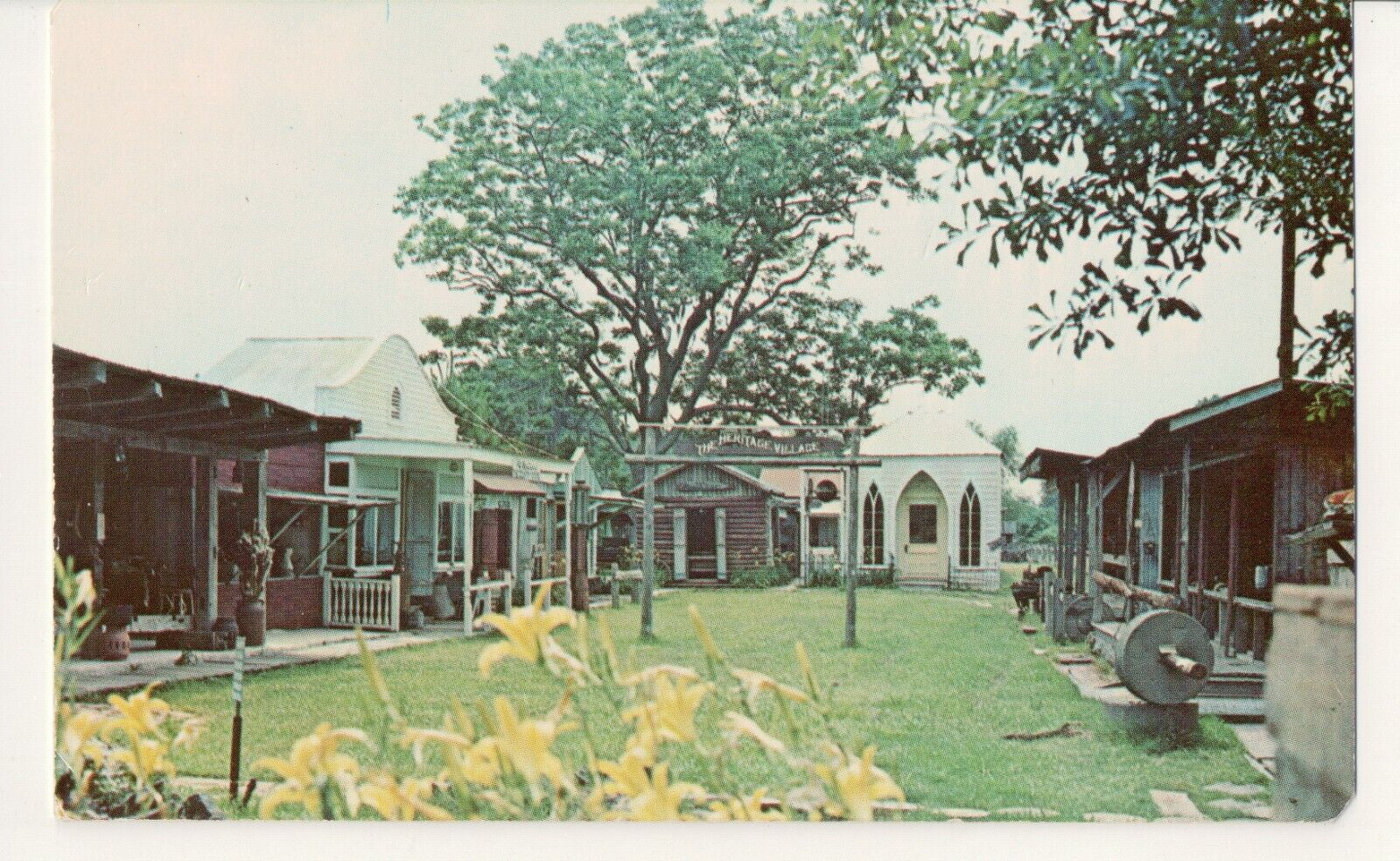
Postcard Heritage Village Loreauville Louisiana Circa 1974

For many years, one of the first museums ("The Heritage Village") in southern Louisiana dedicated to the history of the Acadians and the Cajun culture was on Main Street near the present day Loreauville High School. The "Heritage Village" was privately owned and funded by a local resident well versed in the history and culture of the Acadians. The museum site was located behind a private home west of School Drive and north of the existing Loreauville High School Gymnasium. The museum area was an outdoor facility in a large horseshoe shape, with the apex of the horseshoe near Bayou Teche. The museum was in operation from approximately 1970 until the early 1980s. Several period buildings were donated to the museum from local residents and moved to the site, including the original one-room schoolhouse that was used in Loreauville between 1900 and 1925. Other displays in the museum celebrated local Cajun culture with displays of period clothing, housewares, and early historic relics from the 19th century. A small collection of the artifacts from the Loreauville museum were donated to the Acadian Village in Lafayette upon the closure of the Loreauville Museum. In the late 70s, the original Pulpit from the Catholic Church was found in the collection and was donated back to the Church and renovated and reinstalled by Father Ronald Groschen.

== Points of interest ==
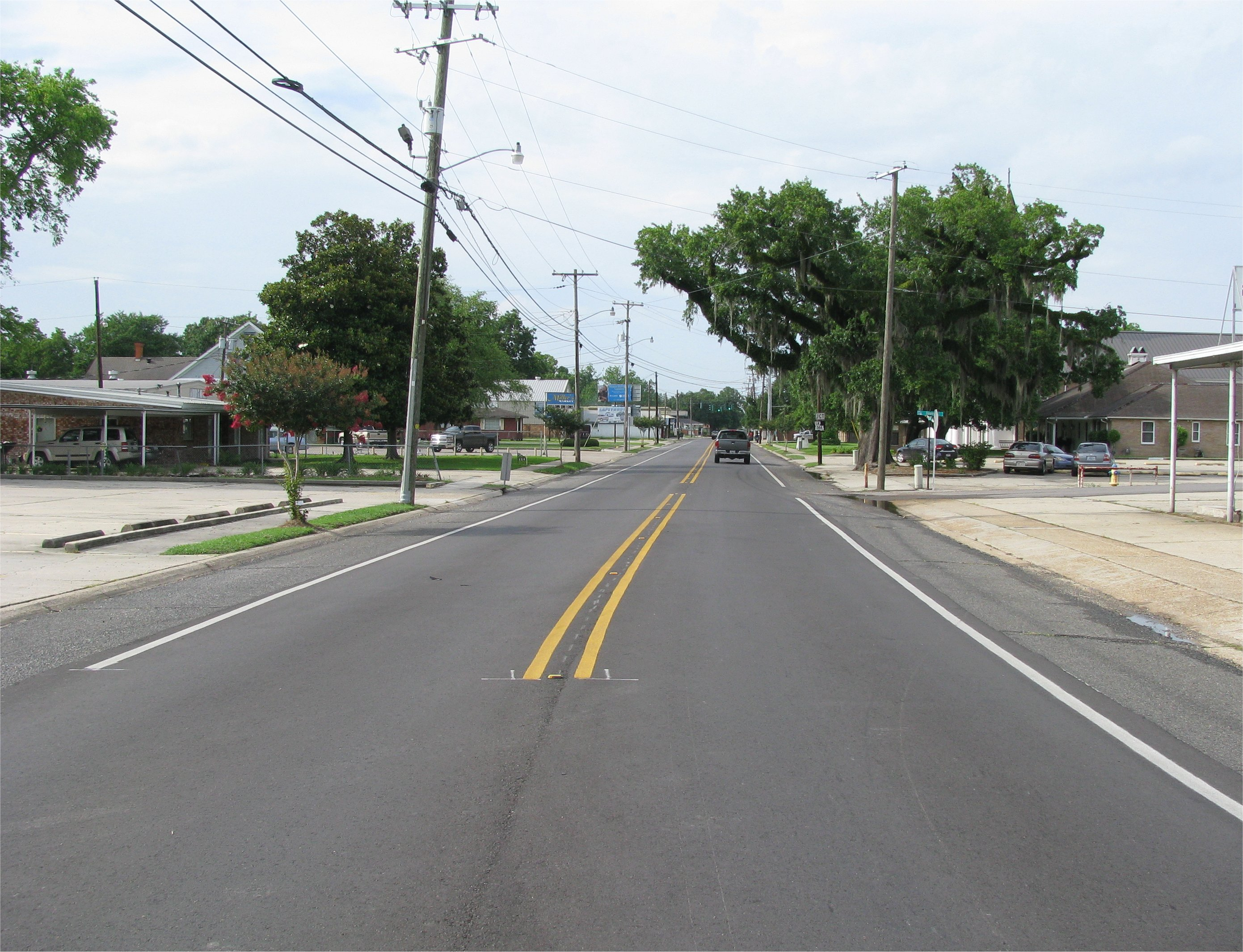
Main Street, looking north towards the village center

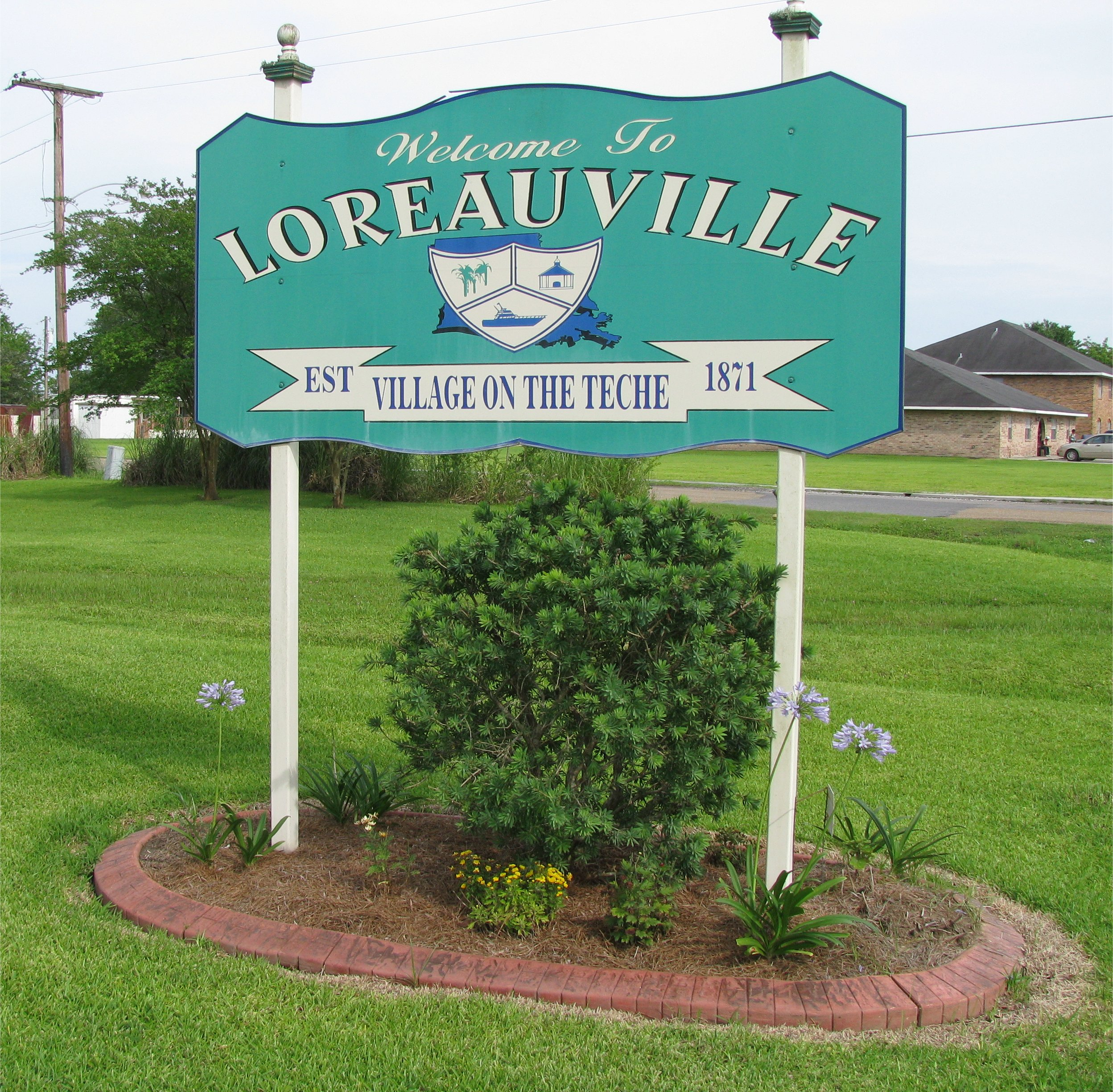
Welcome sign at the north entrance to the village

Bayou Teche winds its way through Loreauville along the western edge of the village. Several 19th-century wood-fired sugar mills were located along Bayou Teche within the village limits. The growing of sugar cane was an important crop in the early days of the settlement. One processing site was located approximately 0.5 miles (0.8 km) north of the Loreauville Bridge on Bridge Street, on the east bank of the bayou. As late as 1970 several brick foundations and remains of the original fire pits and kettles were visible on the banks of the bayou. Alterations to the landscape in that area have rendered this and most other sites invisible to the naked eye, but archeological evidence (fired bricks, and other detritus) remains just beneath the surface. With the centralization of sugarcane processing via agricultural cooperatives, local processing became more centralized at the Vida Shaw sugar mill, which operated from the late 1930s until the early 1970s on Bayou Teche at Vida Shaw Road.

Lake Dauterive or Lake Fausse Pointe is located to the east of Loreauville and is a popular spot for hunting, fishing, and recreational water sports. The boat landing at the end of Louisiana Highway 3242 (Lake Dauterive Road) was one of several filming locations for the 1977 film Return to Boggy Creek. Lake Fausse Pointe State Park is east of the boat landing and is accessible via Parish Road 169/Bayou Benoit Levee Road via travel through St. Martin Parish.

The Loreauville branch of the Iberia Parish Public Library, now located on Broussard Road next to Loreauville Elementary School, replaced the old 1960's era Public Library located at Main Street and Breaux Street.

Loreauville High School, one of five public high schools in Iberia Parish, serves local students from 7th through 12th grade. This masonry and wood facility was constructed in the early 1940s. The main building has been renovated, expanded, and modernized over the years to accommodate a growing student population. The main building in the 1940s housed all of Loreauville's student population, and as the village grew in population, additional facilities were added. The original central building may be the oldest school facility in continuous use in Iberia Parish.

== Historic businesses, buildings and structures ==
Main Street in Loreauville has evolved over the years since the establishment of the village.

- (Nick) Borel's Grocery, situated on Main and Braquet Street at the north end of the village. Borel's grocery was in operation from the late 1940s until the mid-1970s when it was sold. Several businesses have subsequently occupied the building.
- Homer's Texaco Service Station, located at the northeast corner of the intersection of Louisiana Highway 86 and Lake Dauterive Road (Louisiana Highway 3242). The family-owned business was in continuous operation from 1946 until the late 1990s. The existing large metal frame of the building was constructed by Roy Breaux Sr. and the welders of Breaux's Bay Craft in 1961.
- W.W. Vaughn General Merchandise (General Store), located at the southeast corner of the intersection of Louisiana Highway 86 and Lake Dauterive Road (Louisiana Highway 3242). The family-owned business was located in a 19th-century brick and wood-frame structure that operated from the early 1900s until the early 1970s. The store originally opened as the "Edgar J. Vaughn General Merchandise" store prior to World War I. As was common in those days, the Edgar Vaughn store issued its own tin coinage as local currency in various denominations (mainly 1-, 5-, and 10-cent denominations) when dealing in barter transactions as a way to equalize transactions. Few of the coins exist today, but a few were donated to the Acadian Village museum by family members. The building was eradicated in the early 21st century.
- The OJ Oubre Lumber Company, named for Oscar J. Oubre, operated from the present location of the Judice Building Supplies (JBS) store. The Loreauville branch of the OJ Oubre lumber company was a separate store owned and operated by the OJ Oubre lumber company of New Iberia.
- The State National Bank Building, located at the intersection of Main Street and Ed Broussard Road, is a masonry facility that was constructed in the early 1960s and served as the only financial institution in Loreauville for many years. Ownership and identity of the facility has changed many times over the years, but many residents still refer to the facility as the "State National Bank Building". A large clock was a prominent feature of the original bank and served the local residents and teenagers in the 1960s and '70s.
- U.S. Postal Mail facility (pictured). Located on Main Street, this small building served as the official post office for ZIP code 70552 until the mid-1960s, when it was replaced by a larger brick facility at the same location. A modern larger facility constructed in the 1990s replaced the 1960s era building on the northern edge of the village. The mid-1960s brick post office structure remains and has been the site of several businesses in the intervening years.
- Loreauville Substation of the Iberia Parish Sheriff's Department, located on Main Street adjacent to the Meat Market. This small wood-framed structure served as a police substation and radio dispatch terminal for a short period during the 1970s. A temporary holding facility was constructed but rarely used. The office was staffed by one part-time employee and served to take offense reports, answer routine inquiries, and coordinate local law enforcement presence in the village. The substation was closed in the mid-1970s.
- Lloyd's Meat Market, located on Main Street between Railroad Avenue and Bourgeois Street in a wood and brick-framed structure. This butcher offered locally produced fresh seafood and meat from the 1960s until the early 1980s.
- The Brown Derby, located on Main Street just north of Railroad Avenue, served adult refreshment from the mid-1960s until the mid-1970s. Several businesses operating in the same service have occupied the site since the original Brown Derby.
- Mestayer's Grocery Store, located on the northwest corner of Main and Bridge streets. The family-owned grocery store operated from the 1950s until the early 1980s. The building remains and has hosted a number of businesses in the intervening years.
- Tan Vaughn's Barber Shop, an extremely small (less than 200 square feet) wooden structure that was located at the intersection of Main Street and Railroad Avenue (southeast corner). Tan's barbershop was in operation from the late 1940s until the early 1990s and contained a single barber chair, with two or three waiting chairs for customers. The structure was demolished in the 1990s and in its location is the Loreauville Town Hall.
- From the 1940s until it was removed in the mid-1980s, Loreauville had a Tin Man-style water tower adjacent to the Loreauville Volunteer Fire Department Fire Station on Bridge Street. The tower was located between the fire station and the bridge and held approximately 50,000 U.S. gallons of water. Its architectural style was reminiscent of the Tin Man in the movie The Wizard of Oz. Tin Man water towers continue to dot the increasingly urbanized landscape in America, but are rapidly disappearing as more modern and larger capacity water towers are constructed as their replacement. With the construction of the new water tower at the north end of the village in the early 1980s, the original Tin Man water tower was declared obsolete and torn down.
- Loreauville Movie Theater. This wood-framed structure was located on Main Street south of Bridge Street adjacent to Ed Broussard Marine Services. The structure is fondly remembered by many residents as providing entertainment during the late 1920s until after World War II. The movie theater transitioned from silent films through modern films with local residents providing the musical accompaniment during the silent film era. The structure was demolished and removed in the 1970s.
- Masso's Cafe, located in a small wooden structure between the Ed Broussard Marine Service Company and Bridge Street. Masso's was a small family-owned cafe operated by a local family. The cafe seated between 10 and 20 customers, with a small lunch counter that accommodated four to five customers. Masso's Cafe was in operation from the mid-1950s until the late 1970s. The structure was demolished and removed during the late 1980s.
- Our Lady of Victory Catholic Church, located at the intersection of Daigre Street and Victory Drive. The present church building was erected in the 1970s to replace the original wooden church (later destroyed by fire in 1992) erected to serve the African-American community during the days of segregation.
- St. Joseph's Catholic Church Hall, located on Main Street immediately adjacent to St. Joseph's Catholic Church, has been used by area residents for weddings, wakes, celebrations, and meetings since its construction in the early 1960s. From the 1960s until the late 1980s, small school rooms in the rear of this facility were used to teach catechism to local residents. Near the entrance to the hall is a bronze plaque commemorating the services and life of Father Thomas Connors, a bilingual French/English priest from the Our Lady of La Salette Order (Missionaries of La Salette), who was assigned to St. Joseph's parish in the late 1950s and early 1960s. Father Connors perished in a rectory fire in central Louisiana, and the parish hall was posthumously dedicated to him. A separate memorial to the vision of Our Lady of La Salette is in bronze in the front courtyard of St. Joseph's church. The St. Joseph's Church Hall remains in active use and serves as a frequent gathering place for many local residents.
- St. Joseph's Catholic Church, located on Main Street in the center of the village. The current building was constructed in the early 1960s and modernized over the years as its congregation grew and improvements were required. Memorial bronze plaques recognizing Loreauville residents who were killed in World War I, World War II, the Korean War, and the Vietnam War adorn the four-sided concrete base of the flagpole immediately in front of the church.
- Loreauville Hospital, part of the rural network of hospitals in Louisiana, is located at the southern end of the village along the east side of Main Street (Louisiana Highway 86). The hospital opened in the early 1960s and operated until its closure in the 1980s. The site has had intermittent use as a health clinic in the intervening years. The original Loreauville clinic was located in a wood-framed structure in what is now the St. Joseph's Catholic Church parking lot. This facility operated in the post World War II period until its closure in 1963.

== Gallery ==
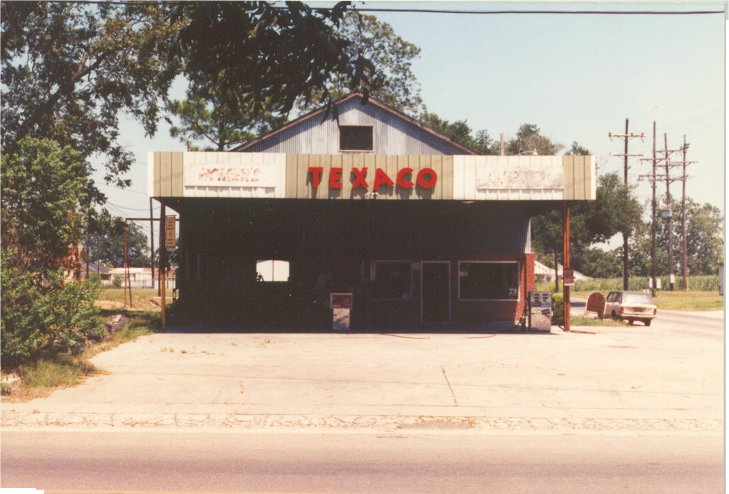
Homer's Texaco Service Station at the intersection of Main Street & Lake Dautrieve Road, circa 1981

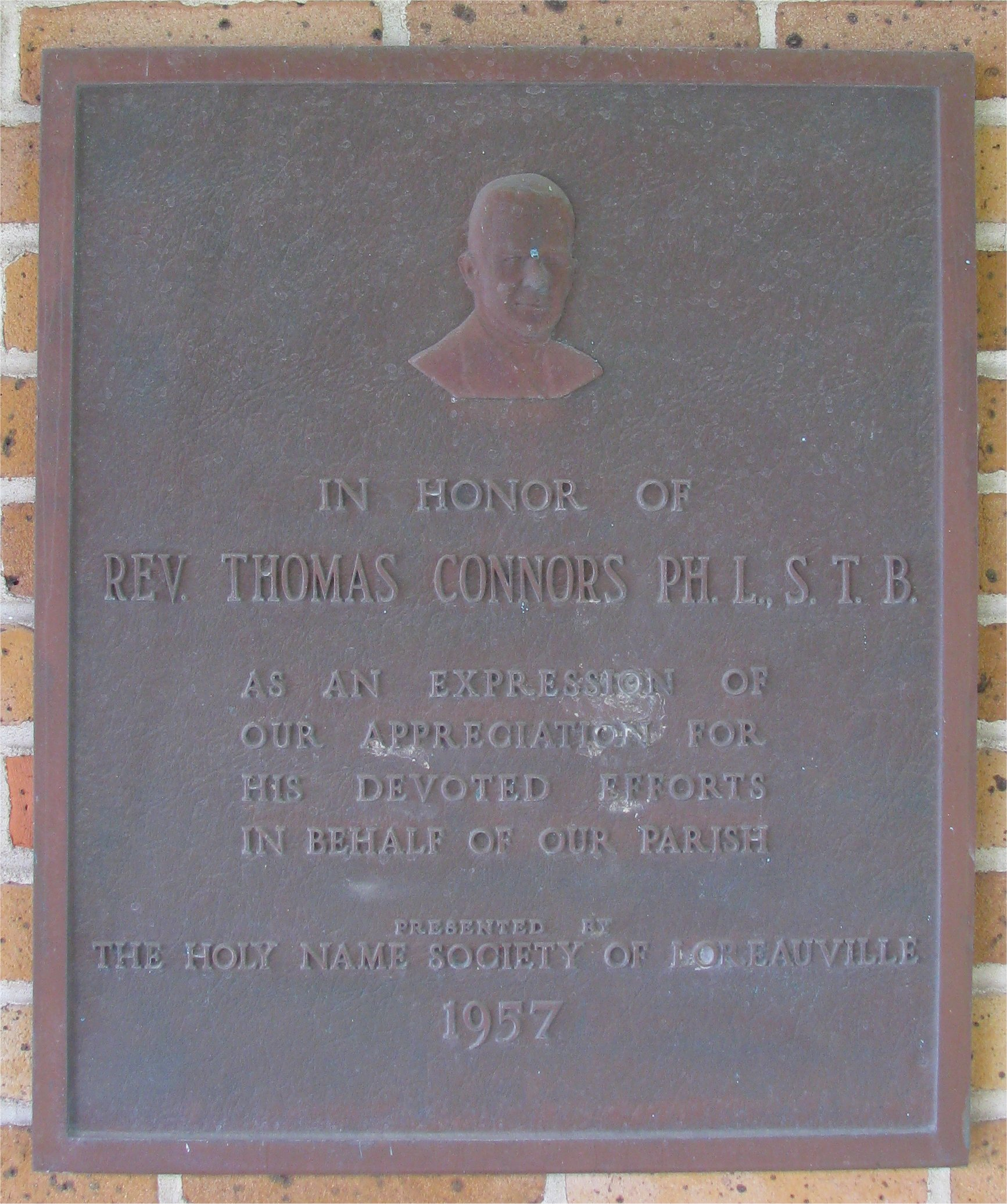
Reverend Thomas Connors memorial plaque, St. Joseph's Catholic Church Hall

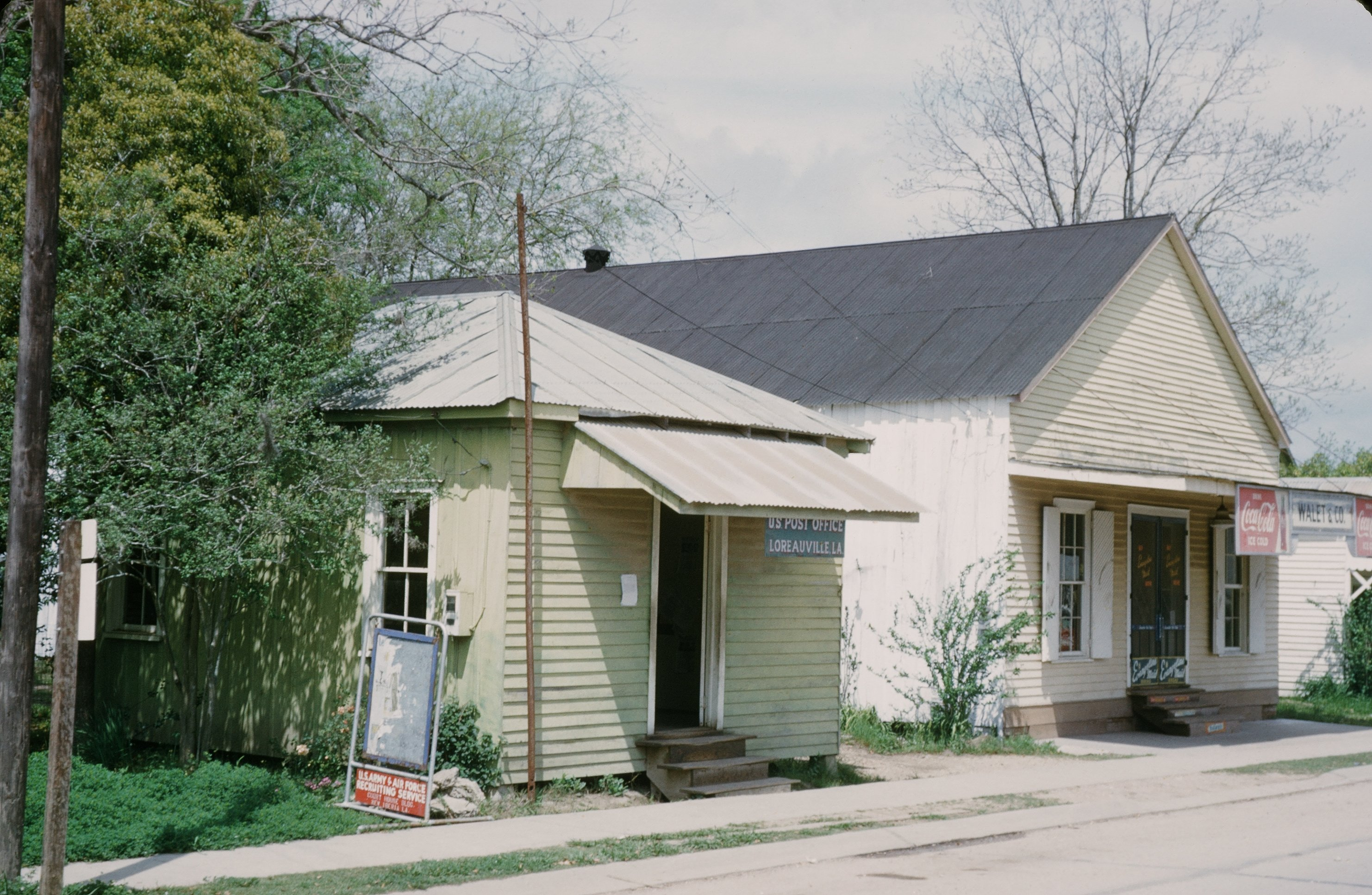
Color Photograph, Loreauville Louisiana, Circa 1955, Main Street, Post Office, Walet General Store

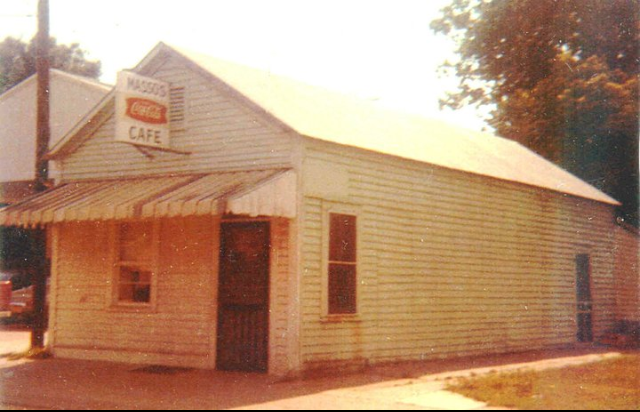
Masso's Cafe in Loreauville, circa 1975 (date approximate)

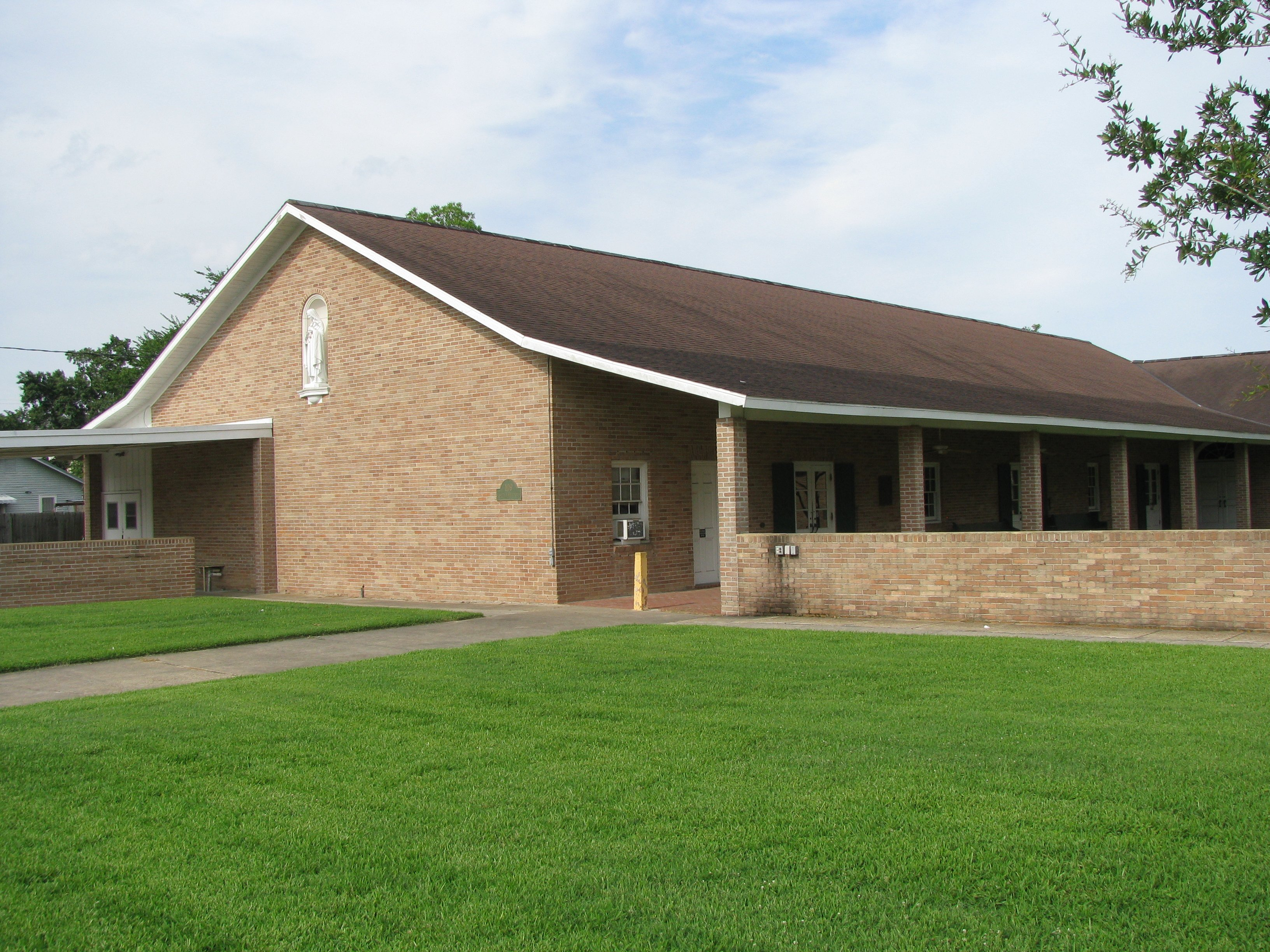
Church hall adjacent to St. Joseph's Catholic Church

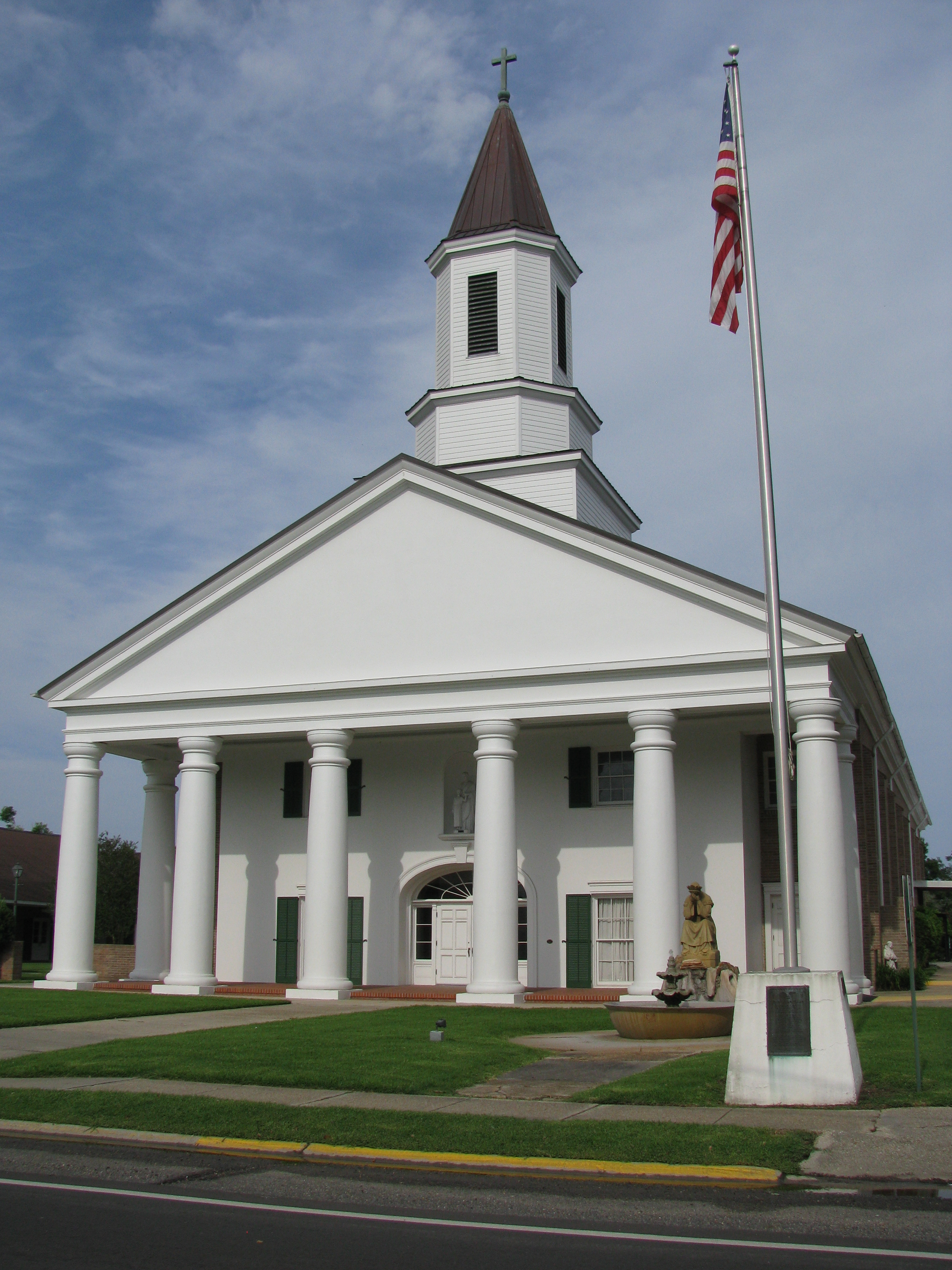
St. Joseph's Catholic Church

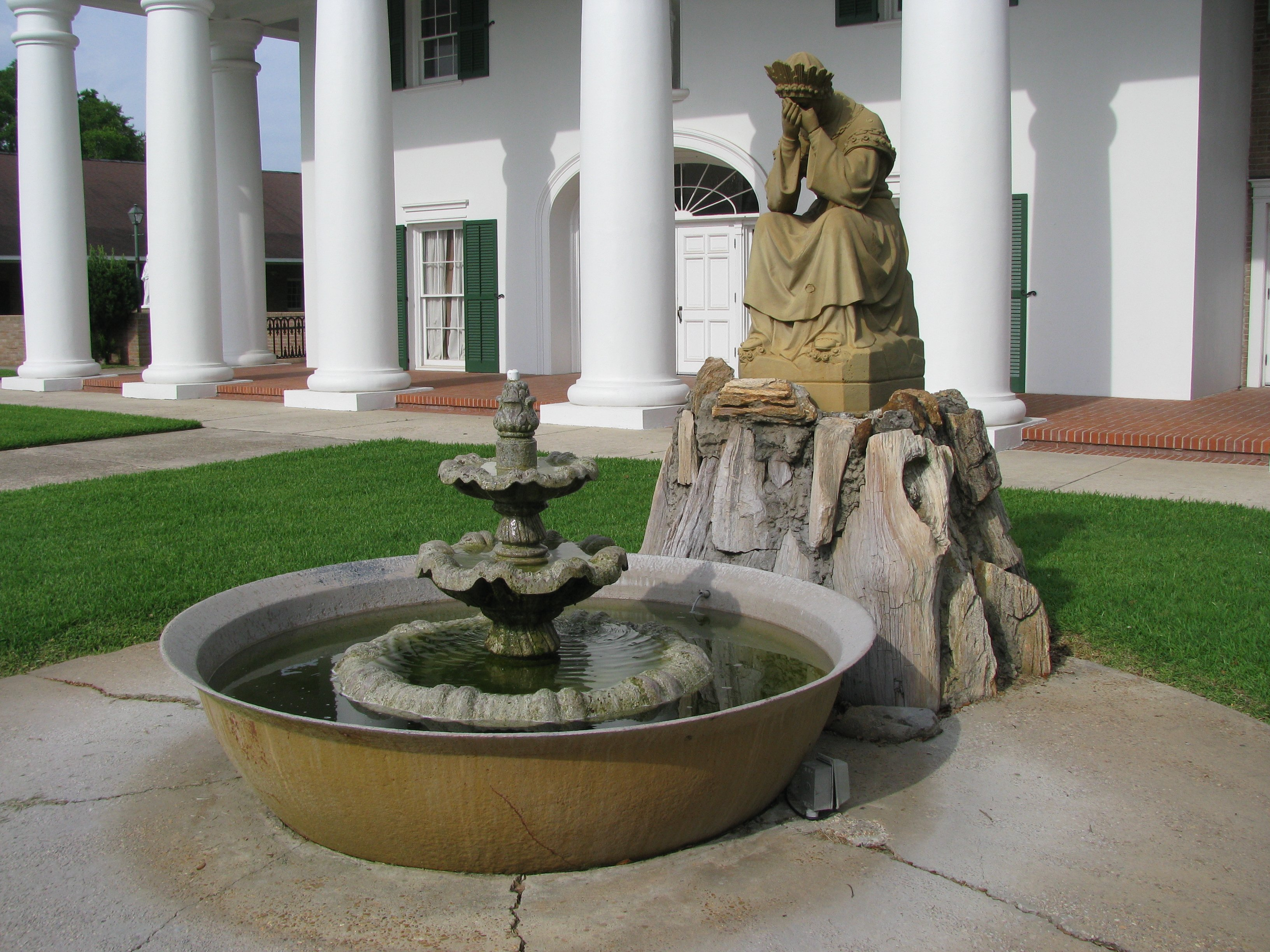
Our Lady of La Salette Memorial, St. Joseph's Catholic Church

== Education ==
Residents are zoned to the Iberia Parish School System, at Loreauville Elementary School and Loreauville High School.

== Notable people ==
- Joseph "Beausoleil" Broussard, leader of the Acadian resistance during the Grand Dérangement. One of the first Cajuns to settle in south Louisiana along with his brother Alexandre, in 1765. They settled in Fausse Pointe, present-day Loreauville.
- Clifton Chenier, zydeco musician born in Opelousas; buried in All Souls Cemetery in Loreauville
