= Olivier, Louisiana =

Unincorporated community in Louisiana

- Unincorporated community
- Location within Louisiana Location within the United States
- Coordinates: 29°58′32″N 91°45′21″W
- Country: United States
- State: Louisiana
- Parish: Iberia
- Elevation: 20 ft (6.1 m)
- Time zone: UTC-6 (Central (CST))
  - Summer (DST): UTC-5 (CDT)
- ZIP code: 70560
- Area code: 337
- GNIS feature ID: 555560
- FIPS code: 22-57870

Olivier is an unincorporated community in Iberia Parish, Louisiana, United States. The community is located less than 4 miles (6.4 kilometres) northeast of Lydia and 4 miles (6.4 kilometres) southeast of New Iberia.

== Etymology ==
Olivier is named for Pierre-François Olivier de Vézin (April 28, 1707 – April 20, 1776) and occupies part of the Bayou Teche's delta ecosystem.
