= St. Martin Parish, Louisiana =

Parish in Louisiana, United States

- Parish
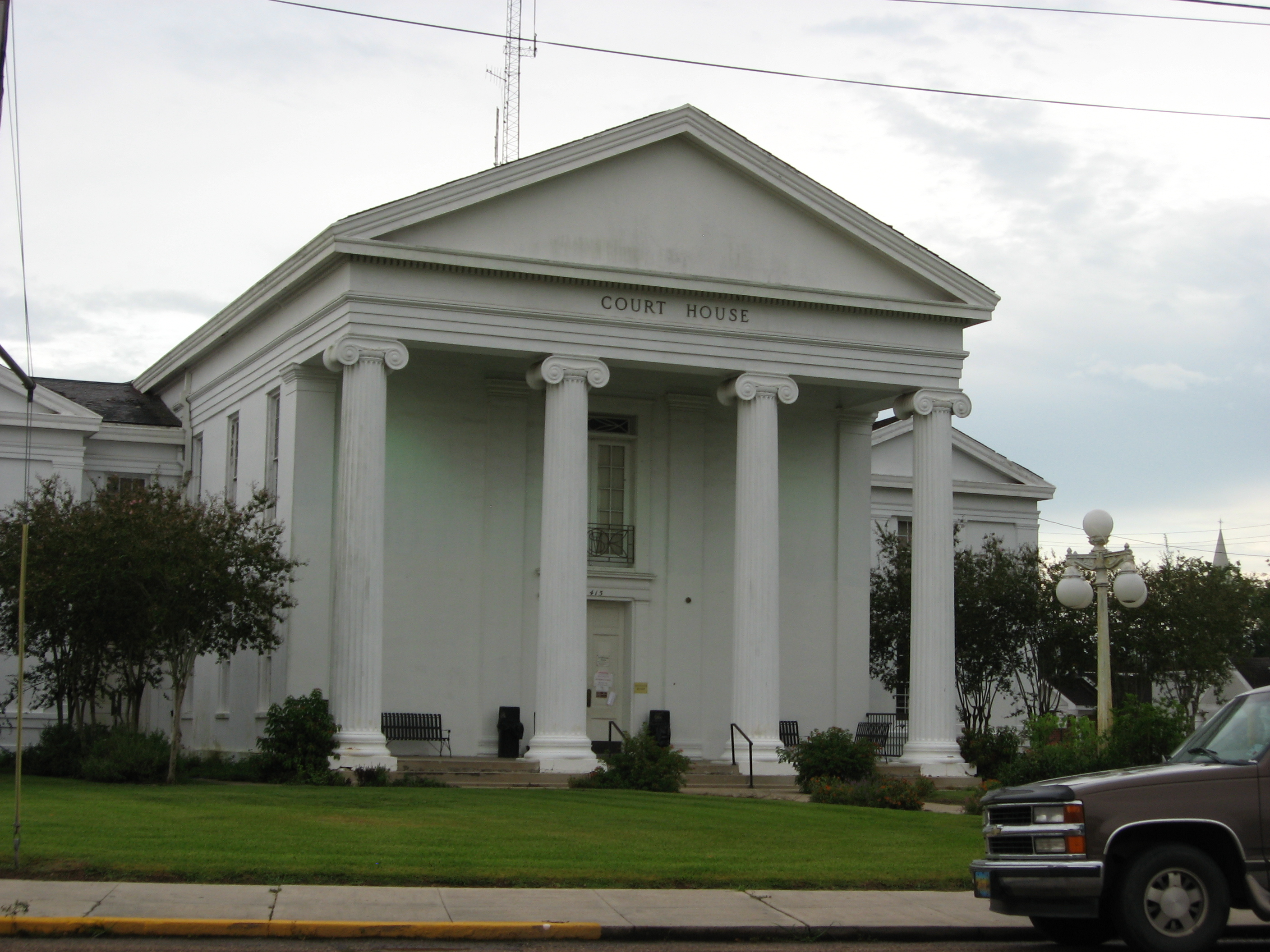
- St. Martin Parish Courthouse, St. Martinville

- Location within the U.S. state of Louisiana
- Coordinates: 30°08′N 91°37′W
- Country: United States
- State: Louisiana
- Founded: 1811
- Named for: St. Martin
- Seat: St. Martinville
- Largest city: Breaux Bridge

Area
  - Total: 816 sq mi (2,110 km^{2})
  - Land: 738 sq mi (1,910 km^{2})
  - Water: 79 sq mi (200 km^{2}) 9.7%

Population (2020)
  - Total: 51,767
  - Estimate (2025): 51,106 ▼
  - Density: 70.1/sq mi (27.1/km^{2})
- Time zone: UTC−6 (Central)
  - Summer (DST): UTC−5 (CDT)
- Congressional district: 3rd
- Website: www.stmartinparish.net

St. Martin Parish (French: Paroisse de Saint-Martin) is a parish located in the U.S. state of Louisiana, founded in 1811. Its parish seat is St. Martinville, and the largest city is Breaux Bridge. At the 2020 census, the population was 51,767. St. Martin Parish is part of the Lafayette metropolitan area in the region of Acadiana, along the Gulf Coast.

== History ==
In 1811, parts of Attakapas Parish were taken out to create St. Martin and St. Mary parishes. In 1824, the Louisiana State Legislature divided St. Martin Parish, resulting in the creation also of Lafayette Parish. In 1844, St. Martin Parish was again divided, yielding Vermilion Parish. In 1868, Iberia Parish was formed from parts of St. Martin Parish and St. Mary Parish. St. Martin Parish was divided into two, as part of Iberia Parish runs between the two non-contiguous parts of St. Martin Parish.

=== Acadian settlement ===
St. Martin Parish was largely colonized in the late 1700s by people from France and Acadia. Their descendants, known as the Cajuns, have maintained the use of French and form a large concentration of French-speakers in the 21st century.

The Acadians brought the tale of Evangeline, a young woman said to have been separated from her mortally wounded betrothed during their expulsion by the British from their territory in eastern Canada. According to the tale, Evangeline later met her betrothed again in St. Martin Parish, but he had already committed to a new love. Evangeline never recovered from the shock of both finding and losing him again. Poet Henry Wadsworth Longfellow's work, Evangeline, A Tale of Acadie, was based on this story.

Evangeline was and remains an icon of Acadian and American culture. The historical Evangeline, who is believed by some to have been an orphan girl named Emmeline Labiche, was purportedly buried on the grounds of St. Martin de Tours Catholic Church in St. Martinville.

=== 19th century ===
St. Martin became a very prosperous parish, growing rapidly in the early 1800s. Most of the revenue at that time was being made by raising cattle. Planters also had profitable commodity crops such as cotton, sugar, corn, rice, and tobacco. These were sold to the New Orleans market. Wealthy planters depended on enslaved African Americans as labor on their plantations. By 1860, there were more than 7,000 enslaved African Americans in the parish. There were also numerous Anglo-American slaves brought to the parish.

A yellow fever epidemic in 1855, followed by a deadly fire and a destructive hurricane, ended an era of unbridled prosperity for elite whites. Combined with the effects of the American Civil War and Reconstruction, the parish elite struggled in the postwar years. The transition to freedom for African Americans was uneven, as whites soon tried to reimpose supremacy and effectively denying them the franchise.

== Geography ==
The parish of St. Martin is split into two non-contiguous parts because of a surveying error dating to 1868, when Iberia Parish was created by the Louisiana Legislature. Iberia Parish divides St. Martin Parish into two separate areas, Upper and Lower St. Martin. According to the U.S. Census Bureau, the parish has a total area of 816 square miles (2,110 km^{2}), of which 738 square miles (1,910 km^{2}) is land and 79 square miles (200 km^{2}) (9.7%) is water. St. Martin Parish is in the Atchafalaya Basin, with Bayou Teche running through it. The bayou was used to ship products to New Orleans.

St. Martin Parish has a wealth of oak and magnolia trees.

=== Protected areas ===
The parish has both national and state protected areas within its borders.

==== National protected area ====
- Atchafalaya National Wildlife Refuge (part)

==== State protected areas ====
Part of the Attakapas Wildlife Management Area is located within St. Martin Parish as well as in St. Mary and Iberia parishes.

=== Communities ===
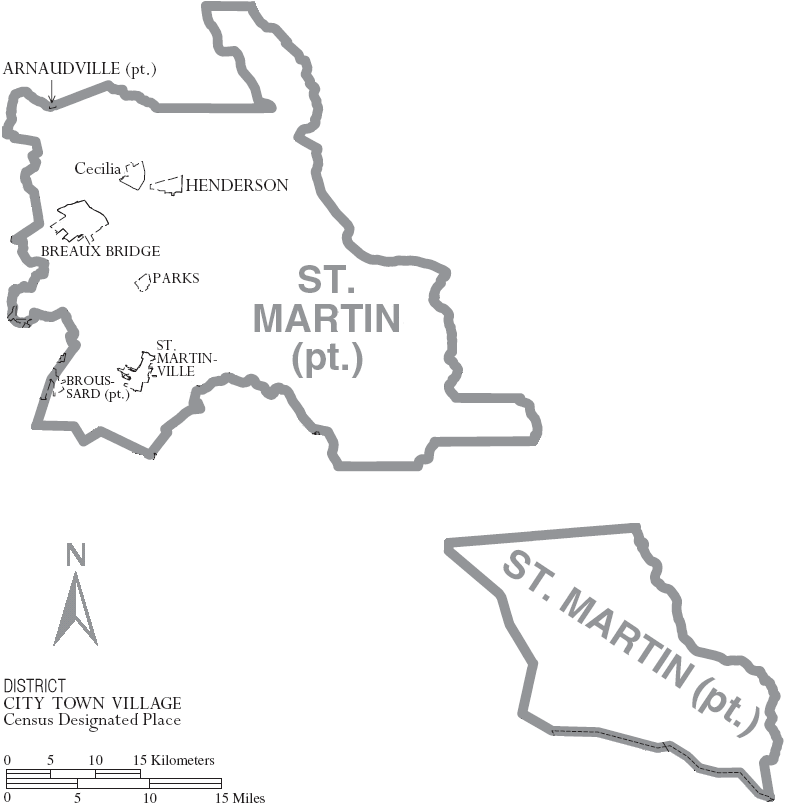
Map of St. Martin Parish, Louisiana With Municipal Labels

==== Cities ====
- Broussard (partly in Lafayette Parish)
- Breaux Bridge (largest municipality)
- St. Martinville (parish seat)

==== Towns ====
- Arnaudville
- Henderson

==== Village ====
- Parks

==== Census-designated places ====
- Cade
- Catahoula
- Cecilia

==== Unincorporated communities ====
- Butte La Rose
- Coteau Holmes
- Gecko
- Nina Station
- Ruth

==== Ghost town ====
- Atchafalaya

== Demographics ==
Historical population
Census	Pop.	Note	%±
1830	7,205		—
1840	8,674		20.4%
1850	11,761		35.6%
1860	12,674		7.8%
1870	9,370		−26.1%
1880	12,663		35.1%
1890	14,884		17.5%
1900	18,940		27.3%
1910	23,070		21.8%
1920	21,990		−4.7%
1930	21,767		−1.0%
1940	26,394		21.3%
1950	26,353		−0.2%
1960	29,063		10.3%
1970	32,453		11.7%
1980	40,214		23.9%
1990	43,978		9.4%
2000	48,583		10.5%
2010	52,160		7.4%
2020	51,767		−0.8%
2025 (est.)	51,106	▼	−1.3%
U.S. Decennial Census; 1790-1960 1900-1990; 1990-2000 2010

St. Martin Parish, Louisiana – Racial and ethnic composition Note: the US Census treats Hispanic/Latino as an ethnic category. This table excludes Latinos from the racial categories and assigns them to a separate category. Hispanics/Latinos may be of any race.
Race / Ethnicity (NH = Non-Hispanic)	Pop 1980	Pop 1990	Pop 2000	Pop 2010	Pop 2020	% 1980	% 1990	% 2000	% 2010	% 2020
White alone (NH)	26,322	28,460	31,813	33,831	32,919	65.45%	64.71%	65.48%	64.86%	63.59%
Black or African American alone (NH)	13,070	14,443	15,464	15,956	15,050	32.50%	32.84%	31.83%	30.59%	29.07%
Native American or Alaska Native alone (NH)	26	78	136	214	177	0.06%	0.18%	0.28%	0.41%	0.34%
Asian alone (NH)	131	310	440	393	440	0.33%	0.70%	0.91%	0.75%	0.85%
Native Hawaiian or Pacific Islander alone (NH)	x	x	2	3	3	x	x	0.00%	0.01%	0.01%
Other race alone (NH)	34	185	41	68	170	0.08%	0.42%	0.08%	0.13%	0.33%
Mixed race or Multiracial (NH)	x	x	282	624	1,329	x	x	0.58%	1.20%	2.57%
Hispanic or Latino (any race)	631	502	405	1,071	1,679	1.57%	1.14%	0.83%	2.05%	3.24%
Total	40,214	43,978	48,583	52,160	51,767	100.00%	100.00%	100.00%	100.00%	100.00%

At the 2000 United States census, there were 48,583 people, 17,164 households, and 12,975 families residing in the parish. The population density was 66 inhabitants per square mile (25/km^{2}). There were 20,245 housing units at an average density of 27 per square mile (10/km^{2}). The 2019 American Community Survey determined 53,732 people lived in St. Martin Parish. The median age of its population was 37.7, and 6.9% of its population were under 5 years of age; of the population aged 18 and older, they made up 75.7% of the population, and people aged 65 and older were 14.7% of the total population. By the 2020 United States census, there were 51,767 people, 19,749 households, and 13,960 families residing in the parish.

In 2000 the racial makeup of the parish was 65.95% White, 31.98% Black or African American, 0.92% Asian, 0.29% Native American, 0.20% from other races, and 0.65% from two or more races. Hispanics or Latino Americans of any race made up 0.83% of the population. The 2000 U.S. census counted 44,915 people in the parish who are at least five years old of whom 31,229 (69.5%) speak only English at home, 27.44% reported speaking French (Colonial French also known as Plantation Society French) or Cajun French at home, while 1.52% speak Louisiana Creole French. St. Martin has the highest percentage of French-speaking residents of any county or parish in the United States.

In 2019, the racial and ethnic makeup of St. Martin was 66.8% non-Hispanic white, 29.1% Black and African American, 0.6% American Indian and Alaska Native, 1.0% Asian, 0.5% some other race, 2.1% multiracial, and 3.0% Hispanic and Latino American of any race. An estimated 1.0% of the parish were foreign-born from 2014 to 2019. At the 2020 census, non-Hispanic whites declined to 63.59% of the population; Black or African Americans were 29.07% of the population, and Hispanic and Latino Americans made up 3.24% of the population.

In 2000 there were 17,164 households, out of which 39.70% had children under the age of 18 living with them, 54.60% were married couples living together, 15.90% had a female householder with no husband present, and 24.40% were non-families. 20.70% of all households were made up of individuals, and 7.90% had someone living alone who was 65 years of age or older. The average household size was 2.78 and the average family size was 3.22. The median income for a household in the parish was $30,701, and the median income for a family was $36,316. Males had a median income of $30,701 versus $18,365 for females. The per capita income for the parish was $13,619. About 18.40% of families and 21.50% of the population were below the poverty line, including 27.70% of those under age 18 and 22.10% of those age 65 or over. There were 19,749 households at the 2019 U.S. census estimates, and 4,800 businesses operating in the parish. The parish had an employment rate of 53.8%, and its population lived in 23,384 housing units. There was a median gross rent of $658 and the median household income was $48,656. Approximately 18.9% of the parish lived at or below the poverty line, and males earned $51,609 versus $32,748 for females from 2015 to 2019.

== Education ==
Public schools in St. Martin Parish are operated by the St. Martin Parish School Board. South Louisiana Community College's service area includes the northern part and Fletcher Technical Community College's service area includes the southern part.

== Politics ==
United States presidential election results for St. Martin Parish, Louisiana
Year	Republican		Democratic		Third party(ies)	
Year	No.	%	No.	%	No.	%
1912	68	11.68%	375	64.43%	139	23.88%
1916	36	2.57%	971	69.41%	392	28.02%
1920	419	56.78%	319	43.22%	0	0.00%
1924	172	26.22%	461	70.27%	23	3.51%
1928	242	11.34%	1,892	88.66%	0	0.00%
1932	107	7.01%	1,420	92.99%	0	0.00%
1936	100	3.65%	2,638	96.35%	0	0.00%
1940	602	15.62%	3,252	84.38%	0	0.00%
1944	153	6.03%	2,384	93.97%	0	0.00%
1948	688	17.99%	307	8.03%	2,829	73.98%
1952	1,554	43.58%	2,012	56.42%	0	0.00%
1956	1,615	42.72%	2,069	54.74%	96	2.54%
1960	858	12.15%	5,506	77.96%	699	9.90%
1964	2,793	37.40%	4,675	62.60%	0	0.00%
1968	1,625	16.74%	3,321	34.22%	4,759	49.04%
1972	6,337	62.00%	3,202	31.33%	682	6.67%
1976	4,112	33.07%	7,992	64.28%	329	2.65%
1980	6,701	44.55%	7,760	51.60%	579	3.85%
1984	9,698	52.17%	8,589	46.20%	304	1.64%
1988	7,541	41.60%	10,148	55.98%	440	2.43%
1992	5,909	28.93%	11,252	55.09%	3,265	15.98%
1996	6,296	30.36%	12,492	60.24%	1,948	9.39%
2000	9,961	47.94%	9,853	47.42%	964	4.64%
2004	12,095	52.99%	10,321	45.22%	408	1.79%
2008	14,443	59.55%	9,419	38.84%	390	1.61%
2012	15,653	61.55%	9,422	37.05%	358	1.41%
2016	16,873	65.53%	8,266	32.10%	611	2.37%
2020	18,203	67.32%	8,439	31.21%	396	1.46%
2024	17,466	69.85%	7,284	29.13%	256	1.02%

== Transportation ==
=== Major highways ===
- Interstate 10
- Future Interstate 49
- U.S. Highway 90
- Louisiana Highway 31
- Louisiana Highway 70
- Louisiana Highway 92
- Louisiana Highway 94
- Louisiana Highway 96
- Louisiana Highway 182
- Louisiana Highway 321
- Louisiana Highway 328
- Louisiana Highway 336-1
- Louisiana Highway 341
- Louisiana Highway 345
- Louisiana Highway 347
- Louisiana Highway 349
- Louisiana Highway 350
- Louisiana Highway 351
- Louisiana Highway 352
- Louisiana Highway 353
- Louisiana Highway 355
- Louisiana Highway 678
- Louisiana Highway 679
- Louisiana Highway 680
- Louisiana Highway 737
- Louisiana Highway 975
- Louisiana Highway 3039
- Louisiana Highway 3083
- Louisiana Highway 3177

== Notable people ==
- Scott Angelle, director of the Bureau of Safety and Environmental Enforcement, former member of the Louisiana Public Service Commission, former lieutenant governor, and unsuccessful candidate for governor in 2015
- Calvin Borel, American Thoroughbred Jockey, and 3-time Kentucky Derby winner
- Gerald Boudreaux, state senator for St. Martin Parish
- Etnah Rochon Boutte, French teacher, and pharmacist
- Jake Delhomme, retired NFL quarterback
- Mike "Pete" Huval, state representative, and former member of the St. Martin Parish Council
- Ali Landry, Miss USA 1996 pageant winner
- Jeff Landry, Governor of Louisiana, former Attorney General of Louisiana, and former U.S. representative for Louisiana
- James D. Simon, state senator
- Jourdan Thibodeaux, Cajun musician, singer-songwriter, cultural activist, and entrepreneur

== See also ==
- List of Louisiana Wildlife Management Areas
