= Henderson, Louisiana =

- Town
- Town of Henderson
- Location of Henderson in St. Martin Parish, Louisiana.

- Location of Louisiana in the United States
- Coordinates: 30°18′58″N 91°47′39″W
- Country: United States
- State: Louisiana
- Parish: St. Martin
- Founded: 1971

Government

Area
  - Total: 3.06 sq mi (7.93 km^{2})
  - Land: 2.99 sq mi (7.74 km^{2})
  - Water: 0.073 sq mi (0.19 km^{2})
- Elevation: 10 ft (3.0 m)

Population (2020)
  - Total: 1,617
  - Density: 541.1/sq mi (208.93/km^{2})
- Time zone: UTC-6 (CST)
  - Summer (DST): UTC-5 (CDT)
- ZIP Code: 70517
- Area code: 337
- FIPS code: 22-33875

Henderson is a town in St. Martin Parish, Louisiana, United States. Part of the Lafayette metropolitan area, its population was 1,617 at the 2020 U.S. census.

== Traffic fines ==
The town collects 89% of its general revenue through traffic fines.

== Geography ==
According to the United States Census Bureau, the town has a total area of 1.7 square miles (4.4 km^{2}), of which 1.6 square miles (4.1 km^{2}) is land and 0.1 square miles (0.26 km^{2}) (2.89%) is water.

== Demographics ==
Historical population
Census	Pop.	Note	%±
1980	1,560		—
1990	1,543		−1.1%
2000	1,531		−0.8%
2010	1,674		9.3%
2020	1,617		−3.4%
2025 (est.)	1,594	▼	−1.4%
U.S. Decennial Census

=== Racial and ethnic composition ===
Henderson town, Louisiana – Racial and ethnic composition Note: the US Census treats Hispanic/Latino as an ethnic category. This table excludes Latinos from the racial categories and assigns them to a separate category. Hispanics/Latinos may be of any race.
Race / Ethnicity (NH = Non-Hispanic)	Pop 2000	Pop 2010	Pop 2020	% 2000	% 2010	% 2020
White alone (NH)	1,102	1,142	993	71.98%	68.22%	61.41%
Black or African American alone (NH)	152	188	154	9.93%	11.23%	9.52%
Native American or Alaska Native alone (NH)	3	8	13	0.20%	0.48%	0.80%
Asian alone (NH)	256	152	114	16.72%	9.08%	7.05%
Native Hawaiian or Pacific Islander alone (NH)	0	0	0	0.00%	0.00%	0.00%
Other race alone (NH)	0	3	8	0.00%	0.18%	0.49%
Mixed race or Multiracial (NH)	12	26	44	0.78%	1.55%	2.72%
Hispanic or Latino (any race)	6	155	291	0.39%	9.26%	18.00%
Total	1,531	1,674	1,617	100.00%	100.00%	100.00%

=== 2020 census ===
As of the 2020 United States census, there were 1,617 people, 628 households, and 489 families residing in the town. In 2000, the median income for a household in the town was $21,295, and the median income for a family was $22,891. Males had a median income of $24,265 versus $17,583 for females. The per capita income for the town was $13,907. About 24.2% of families and 29.5% of the population were below the poverty line, including 44.7% of those under age 18 and 25.6% of those age 65 or over. At the 2019 American Community Survey, the median income for a household was $52,391 and the mean income was $32,973.

Henderson relies particularly heavily on fines and forfeits to pay for basic services. In 2013, Henderson collected $3.73 in fines and forfeits for every $1 it collected in taxes.

== Education ==
Public schools in St. Martin Parish are operated by the St. Martin Parish School Board.
