= List of shipwrecks in April 1863 =

The list of shipwrecks in April 1863 includes ships sunk, foundered, grounded, or otherwise lost during April 1863.

== 1 April ==
List of shipwrecks: 2 April 1863
Ship	State	Description
Jessie	United Kingdom	The Shields (Note: The source says only 'Shields'. This could be either of North Shields and South Shields, on opposite banks of the River Tyne.) schooner's reported sinking from water ingress and pump failure while "seven days out of Stockholm, and within sight of Scotland" was described in a bottle-enclosed message written by a crew member who recorded the loss of the master and the readying of boats at 11 a.m.

== 2 April ==
List of shipwrecks: 2 April 1863
Ship	State	Description
USS Alligator	United States Navy	While under tow from the Washington Navy Yard, Washington Virginia, to Port Royal, South Carolina, Confederate States of America by the armed steamer USS Sumpter (United States Navy), the submarine was cut loose and lost in the Atlantic Ocean off Cape Hatteras, North Carolina, Confederate States of America during a storm.
Claret	United Kingdom	The ship collided with the brig Crocus (United Kingdom) and was severely damaged. She was on a voyage from Hartlepool, County Durham to London. She put in to Whitby, Yorkshire.
Helen	Confederate States of America	American Civil War, Union blockade: Carrying a cargo of corn, the sloop was captured and burned by a boat expedition from the sidewheel paddle steamer USS Fort Henry, the gunboat USS Sagamore, and the brig USS St. Lawrence (all United States Navy) off Bayport.
Mora	United Kingdom	The ship was wrecked on Borkum, Kingdom of Hanover. Her crew were rescued. She was on a voyage from Sunderland, County Durham to Hamburg.
Union	United States	Bound from Hilton Head to Beaufort, South Carolina, Confederate States of America with a cargo of rifle muskets and gunpowder, the 139-ton sternwheel transport was in a sinking condition with her sternwheel breaking up when the armed sidewheel paddle steamer USS Maratanza (United States Navy) rescued her crew and set her on fire. Maratanza and the sloop-of-war USS Sacramento (United States Navy) then fired two 11-inch (279-mm) shells into her, and she sank in the North Atlantic Ocean a 0.5 nautical miles (0.93 kilometres) off New Inlet, North Carolina, Confederate States of America.
Ward Jackson	United Kingdom	The steamship was damaged by fire at Copenhagen, Denmark.
Unidentified schooner	Confederate States of America	American Civil War, Union blockade: Carrying a cargo of cotton, the schooner was burned by the Confederates to prevent her capture by a boat expedition from the sidewheel paddle steamer USS Fort Henry, the gunboat USS Sagamore, and the brig USS St. Lawrence (all United States Navy) in Bayport Harbor off Bayport, Florida.

== 4 April ==
List of shipwrecks: 4 April 1863
Ship	State	Description
Alicia Bland	United Kingdom	The ship ran aground in the Hooghly River. She was on a voyage from Liverpool, Lancashire to Calcutta, India. She was refloated and taken in to Calcutta.
Bellona	United Kingdom	The ship was driven ashore at Warnemünde. She was on a voytyage from Sunderland, County Durham to Rostock.
Marion	United States	The 900-ton sidewheel paddle steamer was stranded on the Double Head Shot Key, in the Bahamas She was on a voyage from New York to New Orleans, Louisiana, Confederate States of America.
Natchez	Confederate States of America	The 714-ton sidewheel paddle steamer burned at Castleman, Mississippi.
Unnamed	Norway	The schooner was driven ashore at Longhope, Orkney Islands, United Kingdom. She was on a voyage from Arendal to the Isle of Man. She was later refloated and beached.

== 5 April ==
List of shipwrecks: 5 April 1863
Ship	State	Description
Amalia	Spain	The schooner was wrecked on a reef off the Punta Castle, Havana, Cuba. She was on a voyage from Havana to Matamoras.
Candahar	United Kingdom	The barque was driven ashore at Villaricos, Spain and broke in two.
Mary C. Harris	Confederate States of America	The schooner was wrecked on a reef off the Punta Castle. She was on a voyage from Havana to Matamoras.
Virago	United Kingdom	The ship was driven ashore on Scharhörn. She was on a voyage from Hartlepool, County Durham to Hamburg. She was refloated and later towed in to Hamburg in a leaky condition.
Voyager	United Kingdom	The barque was wrecked on a reef off the Punta Castle. She was on a voyage from Havana to Nassau, Bahamas.

== 6 April ==
List of shipwrecks: 6 April 1863
Ship	State	Description
Admiral Verbuel	Netherlands	The steamship ran aground at Brielle, South Holland.
Leslie	United Kingdom	The ship was driven ashore and wrecked at Larne, County Antrim. She was on a voyage from Liverpool, Lancashire to Ramelton, County Donegal.
CSS Marion	Confederate States Army	American Civil War: The 258-ton sidewheel transport sank in 30 seconds after accidentally drifting onto a mine she had laid earlier at the mouth of the Ashley River near the mouth of Wappoo Creek off Charleston, South Carolina. The mine exploded, ripping out her bottom and killing one of her officers.
Rhine	United Kingdom	The ship ran aground on the Goodwin Sands, Kent and broke ger back.
Rhone	France	The steamship ran aground off Brielle.
Robert and Mary	United Kingdom	The brig ran aground on the Barber Sand, in the North Sea off the coast of Suffolk. She was refloated.

== 7 April ==
List of shipwrecks: 7 April 1863
Ship	State	Description
USS Barataria	United States Navy	American Civil War: After the ironclad gunboat became stuck on a snag in Lake Maurepas at the mouth of the Amite River in Louisiana, Confederate States of America her crew burned her to prevent her capture by Confederate forces. She exploded when the flames reached her magazine.
Jeune Arthur	France	The ship was in collision with an American vessel and sank in The Downs.
Matilda Catharina	Sweden	The ship was driven ashore at Lerberget, near Höganäs. She was on a voyage from Stockholm to Hull, Yorkshire, United Kingdom. She was refloated and taken in to Landskrona for repairs, arriving on 7 April.
Progress	United Kingdom	The ship was abandoned in the Atlantic Ocean. Her crew survived.
Riffort	United Kingdom	The ship was wrecked on the Goodwin Sands, Kent. Her crew were rescued. She was on a voyage from Sunderland, County Durham to London.
Walpole	United States	The 145-ton sidewheel paddle steamer was wrecked on Minots Ledge off Cohasset, Massachusetts, with the loss of two lives.

== 8 April ==
List of shipwrecks: 8 April 1863
Ship	State	Description
Berosa	Confederate States of America	American Civil War, Union blockade: The steamer, a blockade runner, sprang a leak and was abandoned in the North Atlantic Ocean off the coast of Florida (29°50′N 079°50′W).
Effort	United Kingdom	The brig ran aground on the Gunfleet Sand, in the North Sea off the coast of Suffolk and was wrecked. Her crew were rescued by a smack. She was on a voyage from Sunderland, County Durham to London. Effort was refloated on 14 April by the smack Increase (United Kingdom) and taken in to Harwich, Essex,
Fulwood	United Kingdom	The ship ran aground in the Hooghly River. She was on a voyage from Calcutta, India to Colombo, Ceylon. She was refloated and resumed her voyage.
Julius D. Morton	United States	The 472-ton sidewheel paddle steamer burned on the St. Clair River near Monroe, Michigan.
USS Keokuk	United States Navy	Harper's Weekly illustration from 1863 of USS Keokuk sinking. American Civil War, First Battle of Charleston Harbor: The experimental ironclad screw steamer sank 1,300 yards (1,200 meters) off the south end of Morris Island in Charleston Harbor, South Carolina, Confederate States of America (32°41′36″N 79°52′19″W) after taking 90 hits from Confederate artillery the previous day, 19 of them at or below the waterline.
Pandora	United Kingdom	The brig ran aground in the Gironde. She was on a voyage from Hartlepool, County Durham to Bordeaux, Gironde, France. She was refloated and taken in to Bordeaux in a leaky condition.
R. C. M. Lovell	United States	American Civil War: Carrying a cargo of sutler′s stores for the Union Army, the 45-ton sternwheel paddle steamer was captured and burned on the Cumberland River above Clarksville, Tennessee, by the 2nd Kentucky Cavalry Regiment (Confederate States Army). The Confederates executed her captain and eight African Americans who were on board.
Rover's Bride	United Kingdom	The ship ran aground off Læsø, Denmark. She was on a voyage from North Shields, Northumberland to Danzig. She was refloated with assistance and put in to Fredrikshavn, Denmark.
Saxonia	United States	American Civil War: Carrying a cargo of sutler′s stores for the Union Army, the 60-ton screw steamer was captured and burned on the Cumberland River near Clarksville, Tennessee, by the 2nd Kentucky Cavalry Regiment (Confederate States Army).
William and Sarah	United Kingdom	The schooner ran aground on the Dumball Sand, in the River Parrett. She capsized and sank with the loss of all but one of her crew.

== 9 April ==
List of shipwrecks: 9 April 1863
Ship	State	Description
Countess of Errol	United Kingdom	The ship ran aground on the Goodwin Sands, Kent. She floated off but became severely sagged and was abandoned. Her crew were rescued by a Deal boat. Countess of Errol was on a voyage from North Shields, County Durham to Cartagena, Spain.
George Washington	United States Army	American Civil War: The 243-ton armed sidewheel transport ran aground in the Coosaw River in South Carolina, Confederate States of America one mile (1.6 km) east of the Port Royal Ferry near Chisholm Island and was ambushed by elements of the Nelson Light Artillery, the Beaufort Volunteer Artillery, the 48th North Carolina Infantry Regiment, and the 11th South Carolina Infantry Regiment (all Confederate States Army). During the ensuing action, Confederate gunfire damaged her rudder and struck her ammunition magazine, starting a fire that burned her to the waterline before she sank in shallow water. Her crew and Union Army soldiers on board abandoned her after suffering two killed, ten wounded, and two missing.

== 10 April ==
List of shipwrecks: 10 April 1863
Ship	State	Description
J. D. Clarke	Confederate States Army	American Civil War: The sidewheel transport was scuttled in the Mississippi River in Louisiana outside the mouth of the Red River of the South by the sloop-of-war USS Hartford (United States Navy). Hartford had captured her the previous day.
Haidee	United Kingdom	The ship was wrecked near the Salt Key. She was on a voyage from Swansea, Glamorgan to Nassau, Bahamas.
Nile	United Kingdom	The brig foundered off the Norwegian coast. Her crew were rescued by a Russian ship. She was on a voyage from Dundee, Forfarshire to a Baltic port.

== 11 April ==
List of shipwrecks: 11 April 1863
Ship	State	Description
Annie	Confederate States of America	American Civil War, Union blockade: Carrying a cargo of cotton, the sloop was captured and scuttled on the Crystal River, Florida by the schooner USS Sea Bird (United States Navy).
Margaret	United Kingdom	The lighter ran aground on Patterson's Rock, in the Sound of Sunda. Her crew were rescued. She was on a voyage from Corran Ferry, Inverness-shire to Ardrossan, Ayrshire.
CSS Queen of the West	Confederate States of America	American Civil War: Attacked by the sidewheel paddle steamers USS Arizona, USS Calhoun, and USS Estrella (all United States Navy) on the Atchafalaya River in Louisiana, the ram was set afire by a shell hit from Calhoun and was abandoned by her crew. She drifted downriver and exploded when the fire reached her magazine.
Stonewall Jackson	United Kingdom	American Civil War, Union blockade: After the armed screw steamer USS Flag, the armed schooner USS G. W. Blunt, and the gunboat USS Huron (all United States Navy) damaged her with gunfire as she attempted to run the Union blockade into Charleston, South Carolina, Confederate States of America, from Nassaus carrying 54 passengers and crew and a cargo of rifled guns, ammunition, saltpeter, shoes, tin ingots, lead ingots, and copper ingots, the 862- or 872-ton sidewheel paddle steamer ran aground off the coast of South Carolina in the Rattlesnake Channel or North Channel near Sullivan's Island. Flag and Huron burned her there at daybreak on 12 April.
Surinam	United Kingdom	The ship departed from Trinidad for Greenock, Renfrewshire. No further trace, presumed foundered with the loss of all hands.
Trial	Bremen	The ship was abandoned in the English Channel off St. Catherine's Lighthouse, Isle of Wight, United Kingdom. Her crew were rescued by Felicite (France). Trial was on a voyage from Bahia, Brazil to Bremen.

== 12 April ==
List of shipwrecks: 12 April 1863
Ship	State	Description
Antilles	United Kingdom	The brig was run into by the steamship Black Diamond (United Kingdom) and sank off the Shipwash Lightship ( Trinity House) with the loss of a crew member. Survivors were rescued by Black Diamond.
Bella	United Kingdom	The ship ran aground of the Longsand, in the North Sea off the coast of Essex and was wrecked. Her crew were rescued. She was on a voyage from Middlesbrough, Yorkshire to Margate, Kent.
Berbice	United Kingdom	The barque was driven ashore at Dippin Point, Isle of Arran. She was on a voyage from Troon, Ayrshire to Paramaribo, Surinam. She was refloated.
Golden Liner	Flag unknown	American Civil War, Union blockade:The blockade runner was lost on the Cape Fear River in North Carolina, Confederate States of America.
Juno	United Kingdom	The ship was driven ashore at "Cape Toulcha", Ottoman Empire.
Philip	United Kingdom	The barque was driven ashore and wrecked at Trelleborg, SwedenHer crew were rescued. She was on a voyage from Newcastle upon Tyne, Northumberland to Riga, Russia.
Regalia	United Kingdom	The brig was driven ashore at the mouth of the River Tees. Her seven crew were rescued by the Seaton Carew Lifeboat. She was on a voyage from Hamburg to the River Tees. Regalia was refloated on 16 April and towed in to Hartlepool, County Durham by the paddle tug Esk (United Kingdom).
Valentine	France	The full-rigged ship was wrecked at Guimbering, Senegal.

== 13 April ==
List of shipwrecks: 13 April 1863
Ship	State	Description
Genoa	United Kingdom	The ship was driven ashore south of Rattray Head, Aberdeenshire with the loss of three of her fourteen crew. Survivors were rrescued by the Coast Guard using rocket apparatus. She was on a voyage from South Shields, County Durham to Rio de Janeiro, Brazil.
Stevens	Confederate States of America	American Civil War: The incomplete gunboat was burned on Bayou Teche, two miles (3.2 km) below New Iberia, Louisiana, to prevent her capture by Union forces.

== 14 April ==
List of shipwrecks: 14 April 1863
Ship	State	Description
CSS Diana	Confederate States Army	American Civil War: The gunboat was burned on Bayou Teche near Franklin, Louisiana, to prevent her capture by Union forces.
Friends	United Kingdom	The ship ran aground at Souter Point, Northumberland. SHe was on a voyage from Dundee, Forfarshire to Newcastle upon Tyne, Northumberland. She was refloated and taken in to Newcastle upon Tyne in a severely damaged condition.
CSS Hart	Confederate States Army	American Civil War: The 175-ton ironclad sidewheel paddle steamer was scuttled in Grand Lake in the vicinity of Camp Bisland on Bayou Teche in Louisiana to prevent her capture by Union forces. An intelligence report by the sidewheel paddle steamer USS Clifton (United States Navy) on 28 July 1863 reported that Confederate forces had almost refloated Hart, but had sunk her again upon the appearance of United States Navy gunboats.

== 15 April ==
List of shipwrecks: 15 April 1863
Ship	State	Description
Anna Krell	Wismar	The barque ran aground off Saltholm, Denmark. She was on a voyage from Hull, Yorkshire to Wismar. She was refloated with assistance and resumed her voyage.
Lafayette	United States	American Civil War, CSS Alabama's South Atlantic Expeditionary Raid: The whaler was captured and burned in the Atlantic Ocean near Fernando de Noronha, Empire of Brazil by the screw sloop-of-war CSS Alabama ( Confederate States of America).
Mary Ann	United Kingdom	The schooner collided with the steamship Fingal (United Kingdom) off the Isle of May, in the Firth of Forth and sank. Her crew were rescued by Fingal. Mary Ann was on a voyage from Sunderland, County Durham to the Moray Firth.
Olga	United Kingdom	The ship was driven ashore at Mablethorpe, Lincolnshire. She was on a voyage from Hartlepool, County Durham to King's Lynn, Norfolk. She was refloated the next day and completed her voyage.

== 16 April ==
List of shipwrecks: 16 April 1863
Ship	State	Description
Henry Clay	United States Army	American Civil War: The 257-ton sidewheel paddle steamer was set afire on the Mississippi River by Confederate artillery fire while passing Vicksburg, Mississippi, Confederate States of America. Her crew cut loose a barge she was towing that had Union Army soldiers aboard, then abandoned ship without loss of life. Henry Clay floated downstream as far as New Carthage, Mississippi, before burning to the waterline.
Prioress	United States	The 393-ton sidewheel paddle steamer burned on the Ohio River at Cincinnati, Ohio, with the loss of one life.
Silurian	United Kingdom	The ship departed from Plymouth, Devon for Valparaíso, Chile. No further trace, presumed foundered with the loss of all hands.

== 17 April ==
List of shipwrecks: 17 April 1863
Ship	State	Description
Alliance	United States	The 136-ton sternwheel paddle steamer was stranded on Devil Island in the Mississippi River near Cape Girardeau, Missouri.
Blue Hammock	Confederate States of America	American Civil War: The 74-ton sidewheel paddle steamer was burned at the junction of Bayou Teche and Bayou Fusilier near Breaux Bridge, Louisiana to prevent her capture by Union forces.
Commonwealth	United States	American Civil War: The 1,300-ton clipper, bound from New York City to San Francisco, California, was captured and burned in the Atlantic Ocean off the coast of Brazil by the screw sloop-of-war CSS Florida ( Confederate States of America).
CSS Darby	Confederate States of America	American Civil War: The armed steamer was burned on Bayou Teche to prevent her capture by Union forces.
Gemini	United Kingdom	The schooner was driven ashore north of Berwick upon Twees, Northumberland. She was on a voyage from Dundee, Forfarshire to London. She was refloated the next day.
Kate Corey	United States	American Civil War, CSS Alabama's South Atlantic Expeditionary Raid: The 132-ton whaler was burned in the Atlantic Ocean 4 nautical miles (7.4 kilometres) off Fernando de Noronha, Brazil by the screw sloop-of-war CSS Alabama ( Confederate States of America). Alabama had captured Kate Corey on 15 April.
Louisa Hatch	United States	American Civil War, CSS Alabama's South Atlantic Expeditionary Raid: The full-rigged ship was burned by the screw sloop-of-war CSS Alabama ( Confederate States of America) in the Atlantic Ocean 4 nautical miles (7.4 kilometres) off Fernando de Noronha.
Louise	Confederate States of America	American Civil War: The 343- or 369-ton sidewheel paddle steamer was burned at the junction of Bayou Teche and Bayou Fusilier to prevent her capture by Union forces.
Uncle Tommy	Confederate States of America	American Civil War: The steamboat was burned in Louisiana at the junction of Bayou Teche and Bayou Fusilier to prevent her capture by Union forces.

== 18 April ==
List of shipwrecks: 18 April 1863
Ship	State	Description
Caroline Alice	United Kingdom	The schooner ran aground at Plymouth, Devon. She was on a voyage from Boston, Lincolnshire to Plymouth.
Inez	United Kingdom	American Civil War, Union blockade: The 4-ton schooner, attempting to run the Union blockade with a cargo of salt and shoe thread, was captured and destroyed off Indian River Inlet, Florida, by the barque USS Gem of the Sea (United States Navy).

== 19 April ==
List of shipwrecks: 19 April 1863
Ship	State	Description
Fly	(United Kingdom of Great Britain and Ireland) New Zealand	The cutter dragged her anchors in a heavy swell while at port in Riverton. The vessel was found to be unmanageable, and the crew were taken off by a pilot boat. The pilot boat capsized in the swell, killing her master and one of his crew, along with two of the Fly′s crew.
Munster Lass	United Kingdom	The ship was wrecked at Knysna, Cape Colony.
Newburgh	United Kingdom	The ship collided with the steamship Oscar (United Kingdom) and foundered in the North Sea off St. Abbs Head, Berwickshire. Her crew were rescued by Oscar. Newburgh was on a voyage from Middlesbrough, Yorkshire to Leith, Lothian.
Sumner	United Kingdom	The barque was driven ashore at La Escopeta, near Garrucha, Spain and broke in two. Her crew were rescued.

== 20 April ==
List of shipwrecks: 20 April 1863
Ship	State	Description
General Butler	United Kingdom	The ship ran aground in the Hooghly River. She was on a voyage from Calcutta, India to London. She was refloated and resumed her voyage.

== 21 April ==
List of shipwrecks: 21 April 1863
Ship	State	Description
Hannabal	Denmark	The schooner capsized in the Firth of Forth 2 nautical miles (3.7 km) off Inchkeith, Fife, United Kingdom with the loss of three of the five people on board. Survivors were rescued by the tug Corsair (United Kingdom). Hannabal was on a voyage from Stettin to Bo'ness, Lothian, United Kingdom.
Mary	United Kingdom	The schooner was wrecked on Heligoland. Her crew were rescued. She was on a voyage from Hartlepool, County Durham to Meldorf, Duchy of Holstein.
Town of Liverpool	United Kingdom	The ship was driven ashore at Rattray Head, Aberdeenshire.

== 22 April ==
List of shipwrecks: 22 April 1863
Ship	State	Description
Alma and Tony	Grand Duchy of Oldenburg	The schooner ran aground on the Herd Sand, in the North Sea off the coast of County Durham, United Kingdom. She was on a voyage from Bremen to North Shields, Northumberland, United Kingdom. She was refloated with the assistance of a tug and taken in to North Shields.
Charlotte	United Kingdom	The ship ran aground on Scroby Sands, Norfolk. She was refloated with assistance.
Queen of the Vale	United Kingdom	The ship departed from Pomaron, Portugal for Liverpool, Lancashire. No further trace, presumed foundered with the loss of all hands.
Tigress	United States Army	American Civil War: The steamer was struck by Confederate artillery at Vicksburg, Mississippi, Confederate States of America in the Mississippi River and ran aground. She broke in half and sank after taking additional shell hits. Her passengers and crew were rescued by J. W. Cheeseman (United States).

== 23 April ==
List of shipwrecks: 23 April 1863
Ship	State	Description
Ceres	United Kingdom	The ship was driven ashore at North Somercotes, Lincolnshire. She was on a voyage from London to Hull, Yorkshire. She was refloated and put in to Wainfleet, Lincolnshire.
Charlotte Hinds	United Kingdom	The brig ran aground on the Coulbourn Sand, off Ramsgate, Kent. She was on a voyage from South Shields, County Durham to Ramsgate. She was refloated.
Elizabeth	United Kingdom	The schooner was run into by Juanpore (United Kingdom) and sank off the Blackwater Lightship ( Trinity House) with the loss of three of her five crew. She was on a voyage from Newport, Monmouthshire to Waterford.
Henrietta	United States	American Civil War: The barque, bound from New York or Baltimore, Maryland to Rio de Janeiro, Brazil, with a cargo of candles, flour, and lard, was captured and burned in the Atlantic Ocean off the coast of Brazil by the screw sloop-of-war CSS Florida ( Confederate States of America).
Hyack	Flag unknown	The barque was wrecked on a reef off Cape Mendocino, California.
Ida Nicoline Frederikke	Sweden	The ship ran aground on Hirsholmene, Denmark. She was on a voyage from Hartlepool, County Durham to Nyköping.
Thaetigkeit	Russia	The ship foundered in the English Channel 20 nautical miles (37 km) off Shoreham-by-Sea, Sussex, United Kingdom. Her crew were rescued. She was on a voyage from Hull to Seville, Spain.

== 24 April ==
List of shipwrecks: 24 April 1863
Ship	State	Description
Nye	United States	American Civil War, CSS Alabama's South Atlantic Expeditionary Raid: The 211-ton whaler, a bark bound from a whaling expedition in the Pacific Ocean to New Bedford, Massachusetts, with a cargo of whale oil and whalebone, was captured and burned in the South Atlantic Ocean off the coast of Brazil (05°45′15″S 31°53′00″W) by the screw sloop-of-war CSS Alabama ( Confederate States of America).
Oneida	United States	American Civil War: The clipper, bound from Shanghai, China, to New York with a cargo of tea worth US$1 million, was captured and burned in the Atlantic Ocean off the coast of Brazil by the screw sloop-of-war CSS Florida ( Confederate States of America).

== 25 April ==
List of shipwrecks: 25 April 1863
Ship	State	Description
Elwine Frederika	Flag unknown	The ship was driven ashore on Nantucket, Massachusetts, United States. She was on a voyage from Cardiff, Glamorgan, United Kingdom to New York, United States.
Katharine	United States	The ship ran aground in the Delaware River. She was on a voyage from Philadelphia, Pennsylvania to Havre de Grâce, Seine-Inférieure, France.
Ophelia	United Kingdom	The ship ran aground off Lindisfarne, Northumberland. She was refloated.

== 26 April ==
List of shipwrecks: 26 April 1863
Ship	State	Description
Antoinette	Flag unknown	American Civil War, Union blockade: The schooner was destroyed by Union forces at Murrell's Inlet, South Carolina, Confederate States of America.
Dictator	United States	American Civil War: The full-rigged ship, carrying a cargo of coal, was burned in the Atlantic Ocean off the Cape Verde Islands (25°45′00″N 23°15′30″W) by the merchant raider CSS Georgia ( Confederate States of America). Georgia had captured Dictator on 25 April.
Dorcas Prince	United States	American Civil War: The 699-ton full-rigged ship, bound for Shanghai, China, from New York with a cargo of coal, was captured and burned in the South Atlantic Ocean east of Natal, Brazil, at 07°37′S 31°30′W by the screw sloop-of-war CSS Alabama ( Confederate States of America).
George Chisholm	Flag unknown	American Civil War, Union blockade: The schooner was destroyed by Union forces at Murrell's Inlet.
Jeffery	United Kingdom	The schooner ran aground on the Crapand Rocks, Jersey, Channel Islands. She was on a voyage from Hull, Yorkshire to Jersey. She was refloated.
Liburne	France	The ship was driven ashore and wrecked in the Squan Inlet, New Jersey, United States. She was on a voyage from Marseille, Bouches-du-Rhône to New York, United States.
Unnamed	United Kingdom	The brig was driven ashore on Scharhörn, Hamburg.

== 27 April ==
List of shipwrecks: 27 April 1863
Ship	State	Description
Ada Hancock	United States	While transferring 60 passengers and $45,000 to the steamer Senator (United States) in San Pedro Bay in the harbor at Wilmington, California, the steamer careened, admitting cold sea water into her engine room, which caused her boiler to explode. The explosion blew the ship to pieces down to her waterline, throwing some pieces of debris as far as one-half to three-quarters of a mile (0.8 to 1.2 km). At least 26 people died immediately, and of the 37 others who were injured, 23 later died.
Anglo Saxon	United Kingdom	Bound from Liverpool, Lancashire, to Quebec City, Province of Canada, British North America in dense fog with 444 or 445 passengers and crew aboard (sources disagree), the 1,715-Gross register ton screw steamer ran aground in Clam Cove about four miles (6.4 km) north of Cape Race, Newfoundland, and broke up within an hour, killing 237 or 256 people (sources disagree).
Golden Liner	United Kingdom	American Civil War, Union blockade: The large schooner, a blockade runner carrying a cargo of flour, brandy, sugar, and coffee, was boarded and destroyed in Murrell's Inlet, South Carolina, Confederate States of America by boat crews from the armed screw steamer USS Monticello and the armed schooner USS Matthew Vassar (both United States Navy).
USS Preble	United States Navy	The sloop-of-war accidentally caught fire, was abandoned, exploded, and sank in Pensacola Bay off Pensacola, Florida, Confederate States of America.

== 28 April ==
List of shipwrecks: 28 April 1863
Ship	State	Description
Ange Melanie	France	The ship foundered in the Gironde at Blaye, Gironde. She was on a voyage from Seaham, County Durham, United Kingdom to Bordeaux, Gironde.
William Tapscott	United States	The full-rigged ship was driven on to the Pluckington Bank, in Liverpool Bay. She was on a voyage from Liverpool, Lancashire, United Kingdom to New York.
Unidentified schooner	Confederate States of America	American Civil War, Union blockade: Loaded with a cargo of salt, the schooner was burned in a creek near Magnolia Beach, South Carolina, by a Union landing party.

== 29 April ==
List of shipwrecks: 29 April 1863
Ship	State	Description
Little Helen	United Kingdom	The ship ran aground at Tversted, Denmark. She was on a voyage from Newcastle upon Tyne, Northumberland to Stettin. She had become a wreck by 7 May.
Prestatyn	United Kingdom	The Mersey Flat collided with another Mersey Flat and sank off Woodside, Cheshire. She was on a voyage from Runcorn, Cheshire to Liverpool, Lancashire.
Sarah Palmer	United Kingdom	The East Indiaman was wrecked on the Tuskar Rock. Her 40 crew survived; eleven of them were rescued by the brig Staghound (United Kingdom). Sarah Palmer was on a voyage from Calcutta, India to Liverpool.
Sierra Nevada	United States	The clipper was driven ashore at Fort Point, California. She was on a voyage from San Francisco, California to Callao, Peru. She was refloated with assistance from USRC Shubrick ( United States Revenue Cutter Service). Sierra Nevada was subsequently repaired at Mare Island Navy Yard.

== 30 April ==
List of shipwrecks: 30 April 1863
Ship	State	Description
Horizon	United States	Transporting Company G of the 2nd Illinois Light Artillery Regiment (Union Army), the 315-ton sternwheel paddle steamer collided during the night of 30 April-1 May with the transport Moderator (United States) and sank in the Mississippi River at Bruinsburg, Mississippi, Confederate States of America, killing two men and all 60 of the unit′s horses.
Star	United Kingdom	The brig was abandoned off the coast of Jutland. Her crew were rescued by Ulrike (Denmark).
Unidentified sloop	Confederate States of America	American Civil War, Union blockade: The sloop was run aground at St Joseph's Island, Texas, Confederate States of America.

== Unknown date ==
List of shipwrecks: Unknown date in April 1863
Ship	State	Description
Albatross	United Kingdom	The steamship was wrecked at the Cape of Good Hope, Cape Colony.
Arab	United Kingdom	The ship collided with a hulk and was driven ashore in Algeciras Bay before 4 April. She was on a voyage from Palermo, Sicily, Italy to London. She was later refloated and taken in to Gibraltar, where she was condemned.
Bessie	United Kingdom	The ship was driven ashore in Dunnesset Bay. She was on a voyage from the Pentland Firth to Dublin.
Brierley Hill	United Kingdom	The ship was driven ashore at Schwarzort, Prussia before 23 April.
Cricket	Confederate States of America	American Civil War: The ship was destroyed on Bayou Teche in Louisiana.
Era No. 2	Confederate States of America	American Civil War: The ship was destroyed on Bayou Teche.
CSS Etiwan	Confederate States of America	American Civil War: The 132-ton sidewheel paddle steamer was run ashore near Fort Johnson, South Carolina in a sinking condition on 4, 6, or 7 June after a drifting mine exploded against her side in Charleston Harbor She was repaired and returned to service.
Gossamer	United States	American Civil War: The 144-ton sternwheel paddle steamer was burned by Union forces on Bayou Teche at Franklin, Louisiana.
Halket	Hamburg	The ship ran aground on the Haaks Bank, in the North Sea off the Dutch coast. She was on a voyage from Hamburg to Ghent, East Flanders, Belgium.
Jeune Albert	France	The full-rigged ship was discovered abandoned off Madagascar by HMS Sans Pareil (Royal Navy). She was set afire and sunk.
Josephine Wilcutt	United States	The 86-ton schooner was wrecked at Newport, California.
Maria	United Kingdom	The ship put in to the Isle of Skye, Outer Hebrides in a sinking condition. She was on a voyage from Liverpool, Lancashire to Montrose, Forfarshire.
Milicete	France	The ship caught fire off St. Catherine's Point, Isle of Wight, United Kingdom and was abandoned by her crew.
Nelly	United Kingdom	The ship struck a rock and sank near Ystad, Sweden.
Newboy	Confederate States of America	American Civil War: The transport was destroyed on Bayou Teche.
Nymph	United Kingdom	The ship was severely damaged by fire at Montrose, Forfarshire. She was on a voyage from the River Wear to Montrose.
Policarpo	Spain	The schooner was wrecked on the coast of Morocco. Her crew survived, but were held prisoner by the Moors for ten months.
Providential Memory	United Kingdom	The ship ran aground at Salonica, Greece.
Recruit	United Kingdom	The ship was wrecked in the Gillolo Passage before 4 April. She was on a voyage from Sunderland, County Durham to Shanghai, China.
Reine des Anges	France	The ship was abandoned in the Atlantic Ocean. Her crew were rescued by Belem (Brazil). Reine des Anges was on a voyage from Saint-Martin-de-Ré, Charente-Inférieure to St. Peter's, Nova Scotia, British North America.
Willem de Zwyger	Netherlands	The barque was wrecked at the Cape of Good Hope.
