= USS Kinsman =

Gunboat of the United States Navy

Coordinates: 29.707°N 91.223°W

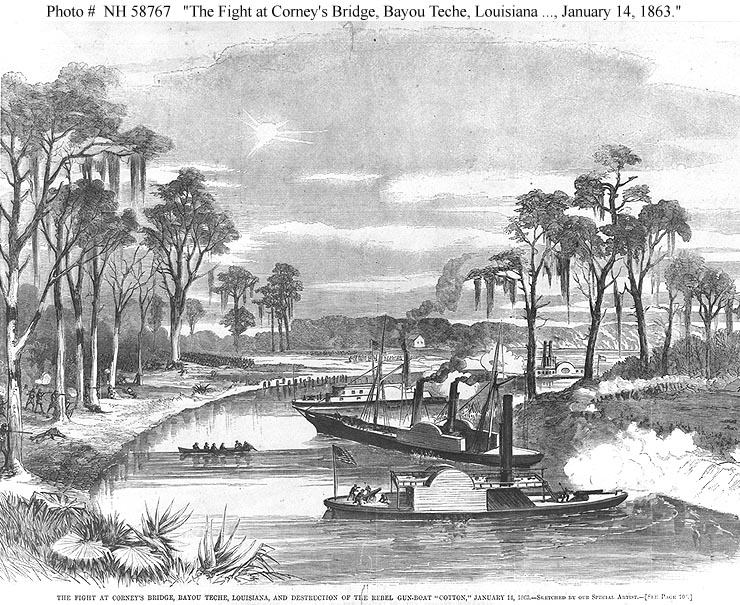
- Kinsman and other Union ships engage the Confederate gunboat CSS J. A. Cotton on 14 January 1863

History

United States
- Ordered: as Gray Cloud
- Laid down: date unknown
- Launched: 1854
- Acquired: 1 January 1863
- Stricken: 1863 (est.)
- Fate: Sunk 23 February 1863

General characteristics
- Displacement: 245 tons
- Length: not known
- Beam: not known
- Draft: 4 feet (1.2 m)
- Propulsion: steam engine; side wheel-propelled
- Speed: not known
- Complement: not known
- Armament: not known

USS Kinsman, sometimes called USS Colonel Kinsman, was a sidewheel steamer captured by the Union Army during the American Civil War. She was used by the Army and then by the Union Navy as a gunboat in support of the Union Navy blockade of Confederate waterways. On 23 February 1863, she hit a snag and sank.

== Commandeered for Union Army service ==
In 1854 Kinsman was built at Elizabeth, Pennsylvania, as Grey Cloud. She operated on the Mississippi River and its tributaries from St. Louis, Missouri. After the capture of New Orleans, Louisiana, in the spring of 1862, she was commandeered by General B. F. Butler and fitted out for river service.

On 18 July 1862, the USS New London and Grey Cloud, reinforced by men from the USS Potomac, steamed toward Pascagoula with the New London announcing their arrival by firing two shells over the large shoreline hotel. The New London docked at the Hotel Wharf at Pascagoula, Mississippi, and deployed about 60 sailors and marines to the village to capture mails and confiscate the telegraph equipment. Sentries quickly spotted a Confederate cavalry patrol and the sailors and marines withdrew to their gunboats. The Grey Cloud moved about a half mile west and attempted to enter the Pascagoula River with the intent on capturing local schooners with turpentine and lumber. However, the mouth of the river was obstructed to prevent passage. At this point the gunboats stood off shore and put in three launches loaded with about 25 sailors and marines each and proceeded up the river. About a mile from the mouth where the river is not but 200 yards wide, the launches were ambushed by a platoon of 30 troopers of the Mobile Dragoons under Lieut Hallett, a cavalry unit armed with Sharps carbines. The launches returned fire, but where in the open and withdrew to the mouth of the river with eight or nine wounded. Once the launches were clear, the New London fired 25 shells into the village and the Grey Cloud fired seven shells. After sitting off shore 19 July, the ships withdrew from the shoreline.

== Damaged in action against Confederate gunboat J. A. Cotton ==
Renamed Kinsman, the side-wheel steamer operated for the Union Army. At Butler's request, Rear Admiral David Farragut assigned naval officers to command the Army gunboats; Acting Volunteer Lieutenant George Wiggins was given command of Colonel Kinsman in October 1862. With USS Calhoun, USS Estrella, and USS Diana, she engaged Confederate gunboat CSS J. A. Cotton in a spirited action 3 November. The J. A. Cotton was a steamboat modified with a cotton-and-timber casemate and a small amount of railroad iron tacked onto the side. Moving close inshore, Colonel Kinsman dispersed an artillery battery, all the while firing at the gunboat. Kinsman was struck under her port bow and the other Union ships were damaged but they forced the Confederate vessel to retire. Colonel Kinsman was hit more than 50 times in this heated engagement, suffering two dead and four wounded. That night the Northern ships captured A. B. Seaer, a small steamer of the Confederate Navy used as a dispatch boat. Five days later, Kinsman and A. B. Seger captured and burned steamers Osprey and J. P. Smith in Bayou Cheval, Louisiana.

Over the next two days, these four Union gunboats would return to engage the Confederate Navy's lone J.A. Cotton and each time failed to put the C.S. Navy's lone entry away. (See: Bayou Teche)

== Transferred to the Navy and against J. A. Cotton again ==
Kinsman was transferred to the Navy 1 January 1863; Lieutenant Wiggins remained in command. With Calhoun, Estrella, and Diana under overall command of Lt. Comdr. Thomas McKean Buchanan, she attacked the J. A. Cotton and Confederate shore batteries at Bayou Teche, below Franklin, Louisiana on 14 January 1863. The J. A. Cotton engaged the attackers but was compelled to retire. Soon thereafter J. A. Cotton's crew set their ship afire and destroyed her to prevent capture. During the engagement, a torpedo (mine) exploded under Kinsman unshipping her rudder.

Vigorous prosecution of the action by Northern vessels forced the Southerners to retire permitting removal of obstructions which had impeded Union ships.

== Loss ==
While transporting a detachment of troops 23 February 1863, Kinsman struck a snag and sank in Berwick Bay near Brashear City, Louisiana. Despite being beached, she filled and slid off the steep bank into deep water where she sank near Brashear City. Six men were lost.
