= CSS J. A. Cotton =

Confederate sidewheel gunboat

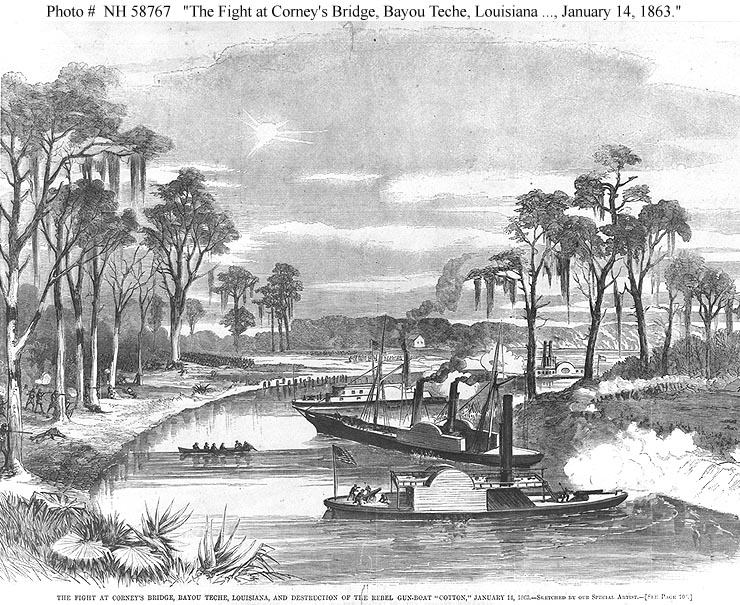
- J. A. Cotton engages Kinsman and other Union ships on 14 January 1863.

History
- Name: (Confederate States of America) J. A. Cotton
- Owner: Confederate States Navy
- Launched: 1861
- Completed: 1861
- Acquired: 1861
- Maiden voyage: 1861
- In service: 1862
- Out of service: 15 January 1863
- Fate: Burned and sunk to evade capture

General characteristics
- Type: Paddle steamer/ironclad/gunboat
- Tonnage: 549 GRT
- Propulsion: Steam
- Armament: 1 x 32-pounder smoothbore; 1 x 9-pounder rifle

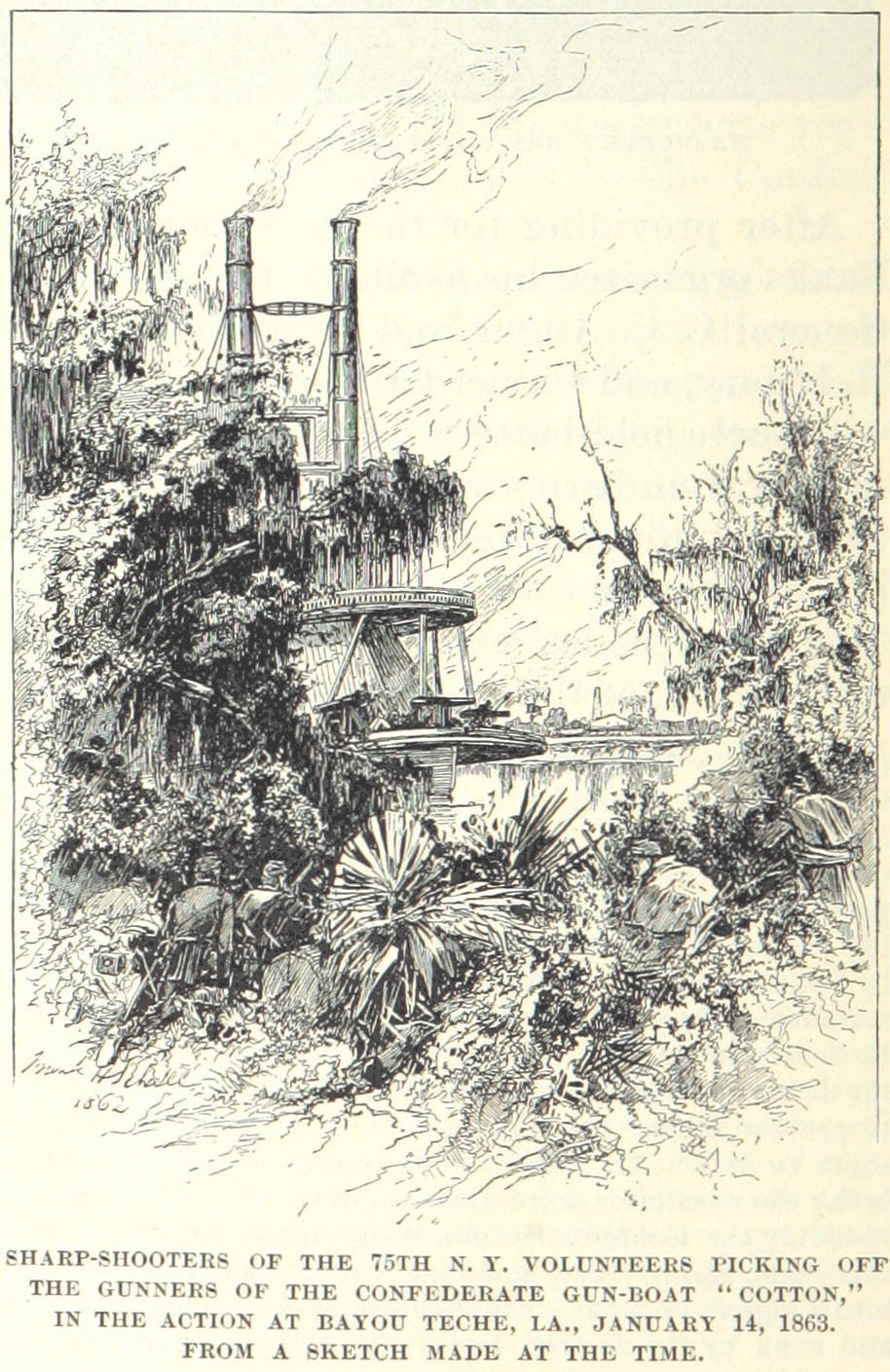
Sharpshooters of the 75th New York Volunteer Infantry fire on the Confederate gunboat CSS J. A. Cotton during an engagement at Bayou Teche, Louisiana.

CSS J. A. Cotton was a Confederate sidewheel partial ironclad gunboat that was burned by her own crew in Bayou Teche off Brashear City, Louisiana, United States, on 15 January 1863 to prevent her being captured by Union forces after she was badly damaged in a battle against United States Navy gunboats.

== Construction ==
J. A. Cotton was built in Jeffersonville, Indiana, United States in 1861. Where she was launched and completed that same year. The ship was taken into Confederate service by 1862. She was assessed at 549 GRT and was armed with a 32-pounder smoothbore and a 9-pounder rifle. The ship was also modified with a cotton-and-timber casemate. She also had a small amount of railroad iron fitted onto her side, which could classify her as an ironclad.

== Service and loss ==
J. A. Cotton was in use as a gunboat for the Confederate side of the American Civil War and mainly operated in Berwick Bay and Bayou Teche. It was in Bayou Teche where she would see her first action of the war as on 3 November 1862, J. A. Cotton engaged the four Union gunboats USS Kinsman, USS Calhoun, USS Estrella and USS Diana near Cornay's Bridge. J. A. Cotton stood her ground against the combined 27 gun barrage from the Union gunboats for one and a half hours, being only hit a few times but without causing major damage to the vessel. In comparison, all Union gunboats were hit and slightly damaged with USS Kinsman being hit more than 50 times, resulting in the deaths of two crew with four more being wounded. During the following two days, the Union gunboats engaged J. A. Cotton twice more in battle. Both encounters had the same outcome as the first with both sides suffering only light casualties and damage.

J. A. Cotton's next encounter would occur on 14 January 1863 as she was ordered to attack Union general Godfrey Weitzel's forces at Berwick Bay, Louisiana. However Weitzel had learned of her plan and send out the four gunboats which had encountered J. A. Cotton in November 1862 to fight her again. The Union gunboats steamed into the Bayou Teche alongside Union transports to attack J. A. Cotton and Confederate shore batteries stationed at Bayou Teche below Franklin, Louisiana. When the opposing forces finally met, the Union gunboats fought J. A. Cotton again while the Union's land-based units engaged the Confederate infantry in rifle pits. The battle would carry on into the following day and by the night of 15 January 1863 with J. A. Cotton had gotten badly damaged in the fighting. Seeing no way of saving the ship, her crew set the ship ablaze to potentially serve as a blockship and especially to avoid being captured by the enemy off Brashear City, Louisiana, United States.

== Wreck ==
The J. A. Cotton was scuttled by her own Confederate crew and sank in Louisiana's Bayou Teche. In 1871, government officials commissioned the removal of all obstructions impeding steamboat travel along the waterway, including the wreckage of J. A. Cotton and other sunken vessels.
