= Bayou Teche =

Waterway in Louisiana, U.S.

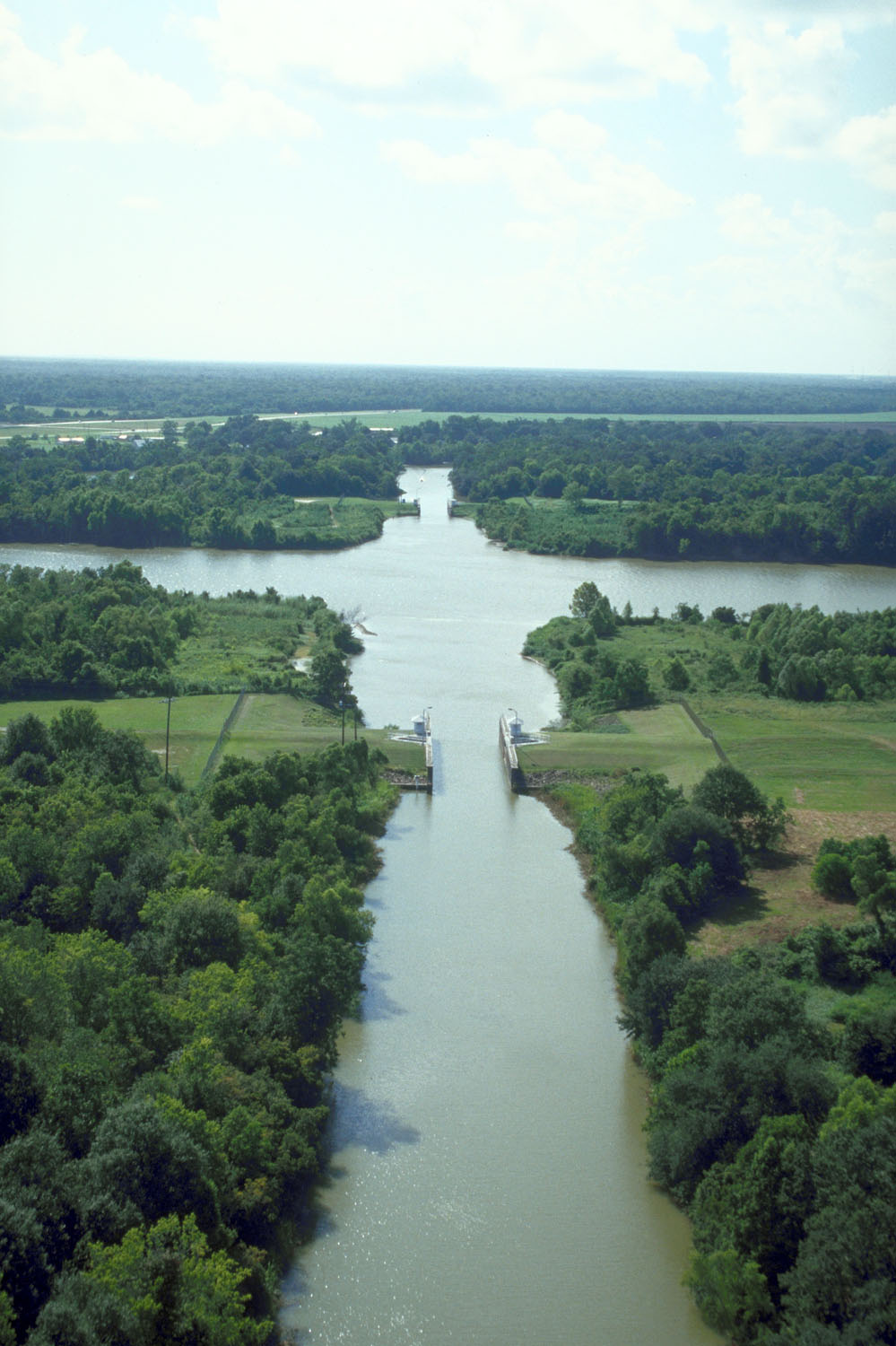
- Bayou Teche at its intersection with the Wax Lake outlet of the Atchafalaya River in St Mary Parish, Louisiana. The bayou runs bottom–top in the picture. View is to the west-northwest.
- Bayou Teche
- Native name: Bayou Têche (Cajun French)

Location
- Country: United States
- States: Louisiana
- Parishes: St. Landry; St. Martin; Iberia; St. Mary

Physical characteristics
- Source
  - location: Bayou Courtableu at Port Barre, St. Landry Parish
  - coordinates: 30°33′36″N 91°57′25″W
- Mouth
  - location: Lower Atchafalaya River near Patterson, St. Mary Parish
  - coordinates: 29°43′08″N 91°20′02″W
- Length: 125 miles (201 km)

Basin features
- Cities: Port Barre; Breaux Bridge; St. Martinville; New Iberia; Jeanerette; Franklin

Bayou Teche (/baɪˈuːˈtɛʃ/)(Louisiana French: Bayou Têche) is a 125-mile-long (201 km) waterway in south central Louisiana in the United States. Bayou Teche was the Mississippi River's main course when it developed a delta about 2,800 to 4,500 years ago. Through a natural process known as deltaic switching, the river's deposits of silt and sediment cause the Mississippi to change its course every thousand years or so.

== History ==
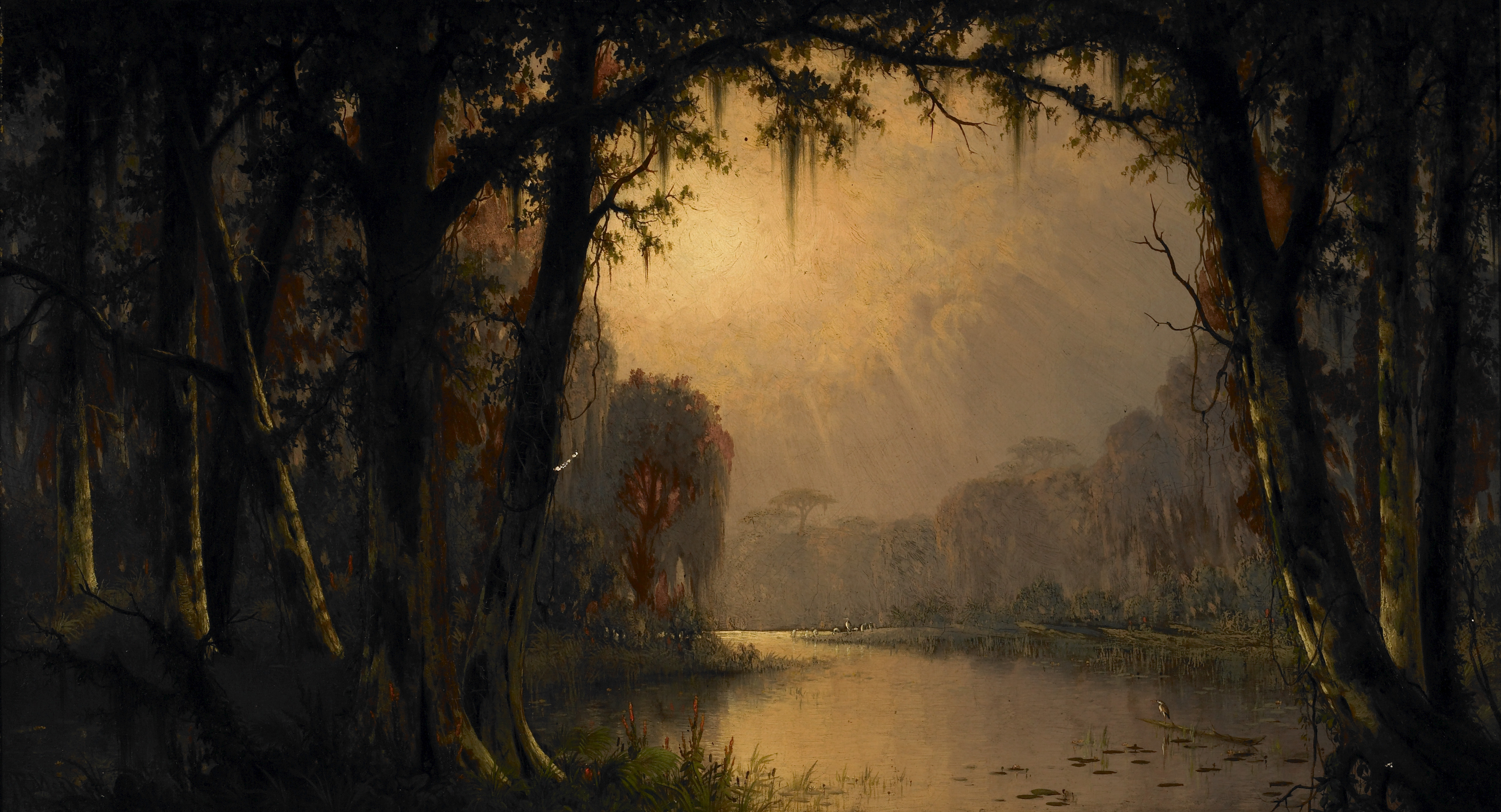
Bayou Teche, Louisiana, an 1883 painting by Joseph Rusling Meeker

The Teche begins in Port Barre where it draws water from Bayou Courtableau and then flows southward to meet the Lower Atchafalaya River at Patterson. During the 18th-century Acadian migration to the area - then known as the Attakapas region - the Teche was the primary means of transportation.

During the American Civil War, there were two naval engagements on Bayou Teche. The Confederate navy had a gunboat on the bayou, the CSS J. A. Cotton, which was partially armored with railroad iron. On November 3, 1862, four Union gunboats, USS Kinsman, USS Calhoun, USS Estrella, and USS Diana, moved up the Bayou to engage the Cotton. All four Union ships were damaged, but the Cotton was forced to withdraw.

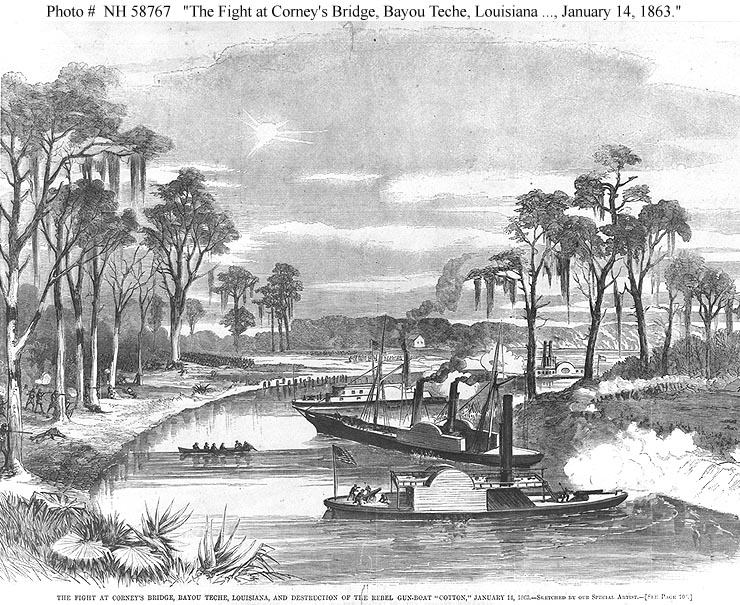
The 14 January gunboat engagement

The second engagement occurred on 14 January 1863. Union general Godfrey Weitzel learned that the J. A. Cotton was planning an attack on Weitzel's forces at Berwick Bay, Louisiana. Once again Kinsman, Calhoun, Estrella and Diana steamed into the Bayou, followed by Union transports. The bayou had been obstructed with debris. The Union gunboats and land-based units engaged the J. A. Cotton and Confederate infantry in rifle pits. During the battle Kinsman hit a mine and unshipped her rudder; the J. A. Cotton was badly damaged, and her crew set her on fire during the night to prevent capture. The Union, however, was unable to hold the Teche, necessitating two more invasions of the Teche country in 1863 and 1864, referred to as the Bayou Teche campaign.

After the levees were built along the Atachafalaya River in the 1930s, the Teche and the rice farms located along the bayou suffered a drastic reduction in fresh water. Between 1976 and 1982, the United States Army Corps of Engineers built a pumping station at Krotz Springs to pump water from the Atchafalaya River into Bayou Courtableau.

The etymology of the name "Teche" is uncertain. One hypothesis is that it comes from "tenche", a Chitimacha Indian word meaning "snake", related to the bayou's twists and turns resembling a snake's movement. The Chitimacha tell an ancient story of how the snake attacked their villages, and it took many warriors many years to kill it. Where the huge carcass lay and decomposed, the depression it left behind filled with water to become the bayou. Alternatively, George R. Stewart asserts that it is "probably a French rendering of Deutsch, the name by which the German colonists of the area would have named their stream. Cf. Allemand ['German']."

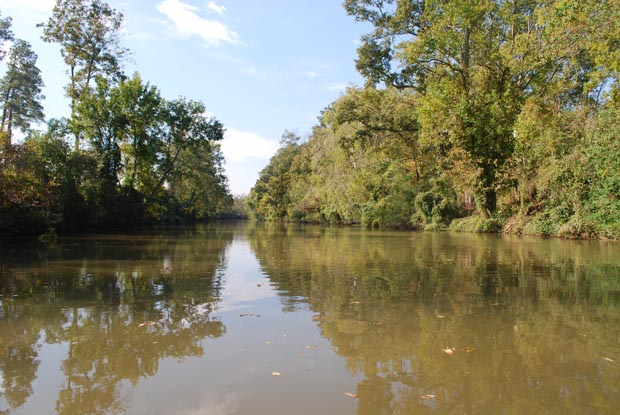
Bayou Teche photographed from a canoe, looking downstream, St. Landry Parish, Louisiana.

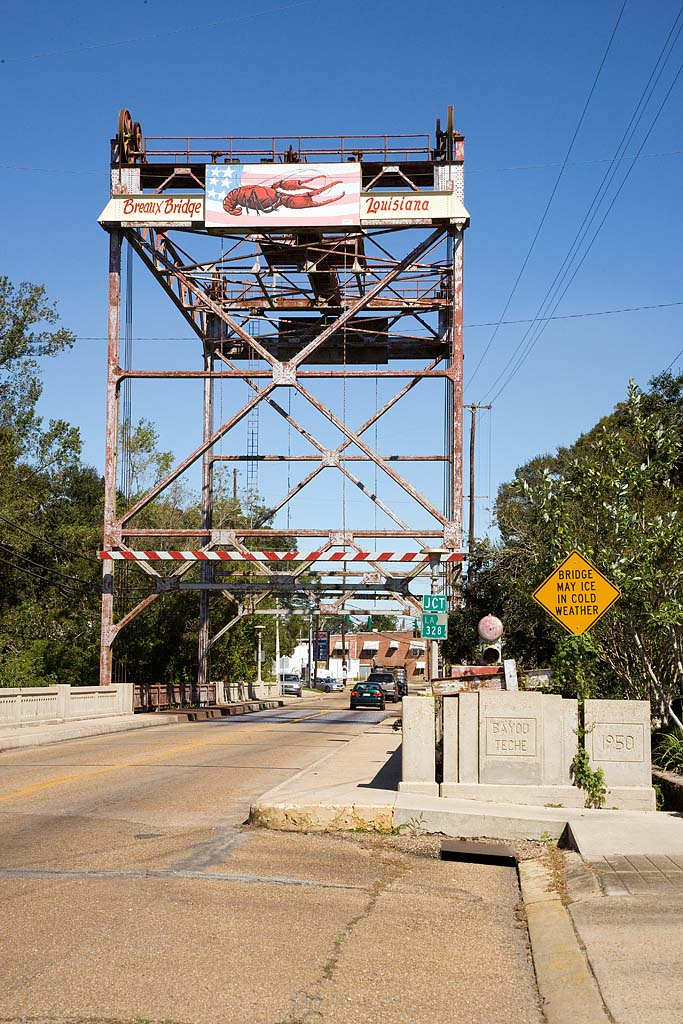
Bridge over Bayou Teche in Breaux Bridge, Louisiana

== Towns on Bayou Teche ==
Towns along the Teche include:

- St. Landry Parish, Louisiana
  - Port Barre, Louisiana
  - Leonville, Louisiana
  - Arnaudville, Louisiana
- St. Martin Parish, Louisiana
  - Cecilia, Louisiana
  - Breaux Bridge, Louisiana
  - Parks, Louisiana
  - St. Martinville, Louisiana
- Iberia Parish, Louisiana
  - Loreauville, Louisiana
  - Morbihan, Louisiana
  - New Iberia, Louisiana
  - Jeanerette, Louisiana
- St. Mary Parish, Louisiana
  - Charenton, Louisiana
  - Baldwin, Louisiana
  - Franklin, Louisiana
  - Garden City, Louisiana
  - Centerville, Louisiana
  - Patterson, Louisiana
  - Berwick, Louisiana

== See also ==
- Bayou Teche National Wildlife Refuge
- Louisiana Swamps
- Bo Ackal, namesake of bridge over Bayou Teche on Lewis Street in Iberia Parish
- Bret Allain, sugar cane farmer and state senator from St. Mary Parish was reared on Bayou Teche.
