= USS Estrella =

Gunboat of the United States Navy

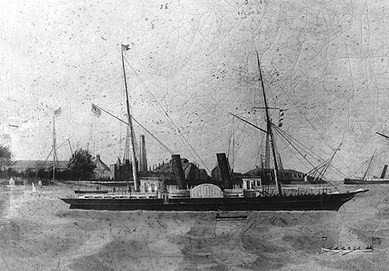
- Painting depicting Estrella off the Pensacola Navy Yard, Florida, c. 1866–1867

History

United Kingdom
- Name: Estrella
- Owner: Magdalena Steam Navigation Company, London
- Builder: Samuda Brothers, Blackwall, London
- Launched: 20 August 1853
- Completed: October 1853
- Fate: Sold 1862

United States
- Name: USS Estrella
- Acquired: 1862
- Commissioned: c. October 1862
- Decommissioned: 16 July 1867; at the New York Navy Yard
- Fate: Sold, 9 October 1867

United States, United Kingdom
- Name: Estrella (1867–1869); Twinkling Star (1869–1873)
- Port of registry: New York, United States (1867–1869?); Kingston, Jamaica (1869–1873)
- Out of service: 1870
- Fate: Sank in Savanna-la-Mar port, 21 May 1873

General characteristics
- Type: iron steamship
- Tonnage: 576 GRT
- Displacement: 438 tons
- Length: 176 ft (54 m)
- Beam: 26 ft (8 m)
- Draught: 5 ft (2 m)
- Propulsion: two-cylinder oscillating steam engine; side wheels
- Armament: (in Union Navy service); 1 × 30-pounder rifled gun; 2 × 32-pounder guns; 2 × 24-pounder howitzers

Estrella was a paddle steamship built by Samuda Brothers in London in 1853 for the Magdalena Steam Navigation Company's commercial services in present-day Colombia. In 1862 she was sold to United States owners and briefly used as a Union Army transport before being acquired by the Union Navy. She served as the armed steamship USS Estrella during the remainder of the American Civil War, carrying three heavy guns as well as two howitzers for shore bombardment.

Returning to commercial service in 1867, Estrella operated under the American flag and, later, as the British-flag Twinkling Star on services within the Caribbean and Gulf of Mexico area. She was seriously damaged in 1870 in Jamaica and later sank in port.

== Construction ==
The iron side-wheel paddle steamer Estrella was launched by Samuda Brothers at Blackwall, London on the River Thames on 20 August 1853 for the newly established Magdalena Steam Navigation Company. She was designed with shallow draught of 5 ft (2 m), suitable for her intended river and coastal transport, and was approximately 176 ft (54 m) in length, with a beam of 26 ft (8 m) and tonnage of 576 GRT. In later United States Navy service she was 438 tons displacement. Estrella had capacity for 60–90 passengers The ship was powered by a two-cylinder oscillating steam engine with an output of 120 nominal horse-power manufactured by Humphrys, Tennant and Dykes at their new engineworks at Deptford. On her official trials on 27 October she averaged 12 miles per hour. Two smaller vessels were also built and engined for the company by the same shipbuilder and engineers, Anita and Isabel, intended for the passenger trade on the Magdalena River in the Republic of New Granada (now in Colombia).

== Commercial service ==
Estrella and Anita sailed from the Thames together on 20 November 1853 and the former arrived at Savanilla, then the main seaport at the mouth of the Magdalena, on 17 January 1854 (Anita a week later) to be prepared for service. The timing was unfortunate, as revolution had broken out in Bogotá, suppressing the demand for river freight. Nevertheless Estrella made a profitable voyage from Santa Marta to Mompox and Magangué, and a little later was chartered to General Mosquera to carry imported munitions up river. On 1 August 1855 she sank in the river Magdalena near Conejo en route to Honda after being holed by a rock; her passengers and crew were saved, and the ship was reported at Lloyd's of London as lost, but in the event refloated and repaired.

In May 1856, the Magdalena Steam Navigation Company concluded that the venture was not sufficiently profitable and should be wound up, for which they intended their three vessels, Estrella, Anita and Isabel, which had been operating under the British flag, should be returned to England for sale. However, the company first sought purchasers at Barranquilla in September, with bids to be received by 15 November. Remaining unsold, Estrella and Anita sailed for England on 23 December, but after only two hours steaming Anita developed a serious leak and began sinking in an increasing gale. Some three hours later the boiler of Anita exploded and she sank in deep water, with the loss of half of her crew of 24. Estrella, also hampered by the conditions, was unable to assist the other ship and decided to put back to Santa Marta where she was surveyed at the British Vice-Consul's behest. It was found that Estrella's deck was hogged, probably as a result the earlier sinking and numerous groundings in the Magdalena, and that she was not seaworthy; in addition, the ship's boats were condemned as "entirely worthless". The surveyors advised that she should not leave the coast before the end of May 1857, when weather could be expected to have improved, and that she should carry additional engineers.

In December 1861, Estrella was still in New Granada and provided safe haven for some residents of Santa Marta during the Colombian Civil War. In 1862, the ship was purchased at Savanilla by the firm McLean & Lintz of New York, where she arrived on 28 May after a nine-day voyage in ballast via Kingston, Jamaica; during the voyage, she struck a wreck which damaged the starboard paddle wheel and she completed the voyage using only one. (Note: American Lloyd's Register describes the ship erroneously as "propeller" rather than "side-wheel", though correct in the 1868 edition.) She was then documented at New York as an American ship and chartered by McLean & Lintz to the US Army Quartermaster Department as United States Transport Estrella from 7 July 1862 at US$400 per day.

== United States Navy service ==
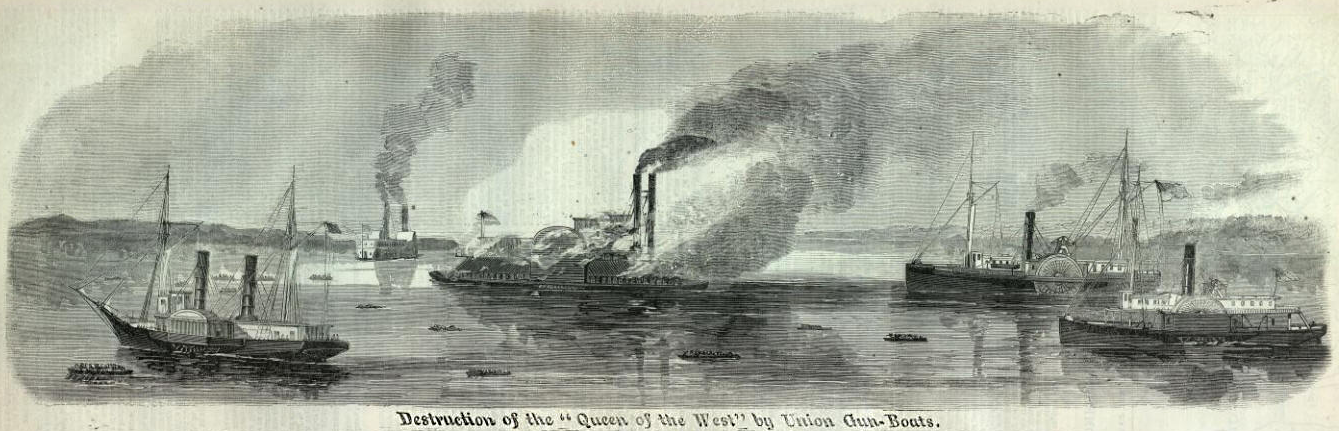
Destruction of the CSS Queen of the West by USS Estrella (left), USS Arizona (center) and USS Calhoun (right) on April 14, 1863

Estrella was transferred from the Army to the Navy late in 1862, and commissioned before the end of October, Lieutenant Commander A. P. Cooke in command. She was armed with three heavy guns – two 32-pounders and one 30-pounder with rifled barrel – and with two 24-pounder howitzers, proving versatile and useful in both stopping blockade runners at sea and at bombarding shore positions.

Assigned to the West Gulf Blockading Squadron, Estrella served throughout the war off Mobile, Alabama, and New Orleans, Louisiana, along the Texas coast, and up the rivers flowing into the Gulf of Mexico. During the first 13 days of November 1862 she took part in a series of engagements with CSS J. A. Cotton and Confederate shore batteries along the Atchafalaya River and Bayou Teche. With her captain serving as commander of the flotilla maintained in Berwick Bay, Estrella led the attack on CSS Queen of the West 14 April 1863. The Confederate ship was set afire by Union gunfire and, after 90 of her crew had been rescued, exploded.

Four days later, Cooke led his flotilla up the Atchafalaya once more, to attack the batteries at Butte-a-la-Rose, Louisiana. The batteries were captured intact, with their garrison of 60 men and large supplies of ammunition and commissary stores. A Union Army garrison was at once sent up to hold the town, another key point won by the Union Navy in its continuing campaign to take complete control of coastal areas. From 3 to 6 May 1863, Estrella sailed up the Red River to join in the attack on Fort De Russy, and during June and July participated in the attacks on Port Hudson, Louisiana which led to its fall on 9 July. Many, if not most, of the Estrella sailors who perished during these attacks, including an Acting Master transferred from the Kensington, were later interred at Chalmette National Cemetery. Union naval veterans who lost fathers, brothers, and even fathers-in-law aboard Estrella, frequently returned to Chalmette in denominational rituals of remembrance. Widows, sisters, and daughters completed physical and psychological family sojourns, capitalized on gilded pensions, and corresponded on the cultural memory of corpses, death, and life aboard Estrella. These women most forcefully invoked religiosity in enacting the limits of reconciliation. Other events in her active service included the capture of schooner Julia A. Hodges in Matagorda Bay, Texas, on 6 April 1864 and a leading role in the attacks on Fort Powell in Mobile Bay on 5 August 1864. These attacks were made in coordination with the battle of Mobile Bay.

After being repaired at New Orleans in the first 4 months of 1865, Estrella served as flagship of the West Gulf Blockading Squadron, continuing to cruise in the Gulf of Mexico and its tributary waters until 30 June 1867, when she sailed for New York Navy Yard. Estrella was decommissioned there on 16 July 1867, and sold 9 October 1867.

== Return to commercial service ==
According to American Lloyd's Register of 1868, Estrella was re-purchased from the Navy, as the entry is based on a December 1867 survey in New York; further, in 1868, she was transferred to Henry Winn, secretary of the Intertropical Company, New York. In March 1868 Estrella was described as an "American" steamer when reported condemned at Kingston, Jamaica, but in the same year was owned by Lamb & Co of Saint Thomas, then part of the Danish West Indies, when seeking parity of treatment in Venezuelan ports with British ships. On 21 December 1868, the "intercolonial packet sateamer" Estrella was reported wrecked in the Los Roques archipelago on a voyage from Saint Thomas to La Guaira, Puerto Cabello and Curacao, with passengers, mail and general cargo. The passengers and crew survived for five days on an uninhabited island and were rescued on 27 December by the Venezuelan war steamer Bolivar.

After being salved she was taken to Jamaica and was registered on 4 October 1869 as a British ship at the port of Kingston under the ownership of a local, Ralph Nirnes. Renamed Twinkling Star, she was given Official Number 61881, and remeasured at 492 GRT, 334 NRT and dimensions 179.7 ft (54.8 m) in length, beam 25.2 ft (7.7 m) and depth 11.1 ft (3.4 m). Soon afterwards, on 27 November, on voyage from Cap-Haïtien to Port au Prince, Twinkling Star developed an underwater crack below the waterline and began to take water; amid general panic, five passengers, including the American Consul in Jamaica, took to a boat and reached Môle-Saint-Nicolas, Haiti. The ship was later also safely brought to port

A year later, on 30 November 1870, Twinkling Star sailed from Kingston for New Orleans but met very bad weather and was forced to put in to Savanna-la-Mar with boiler damage, leaking hull, sails blown away and a ship's boat stove in; then, in arriving went aground, the boat had to jettison some of its cargo. By 24 December, she had been surveyed, condemned and ordered to be sold She remained on moorings at Savanna-la-Mar until 21 May 1873, when she sank in 10 ft water

== See also ==
- Confederate States Navy
