= Lake Martin, Louisiana =

Coordinates: 30.2208°N 91.9111°W

Lake Martin, located in St. Martin Parish, is a wildlife preserve and one of Louisiana's swamplands. The swamplands are home to a few trails as well as many different kinds of animals such as herons, egrets, ibis, bullfrogs, cottonmouths, alligators, and coypu (nutria) rats. Despite its classification as a wildlife reserve, however, there have been minor problems with litter and vandalism.

== Gallery ==
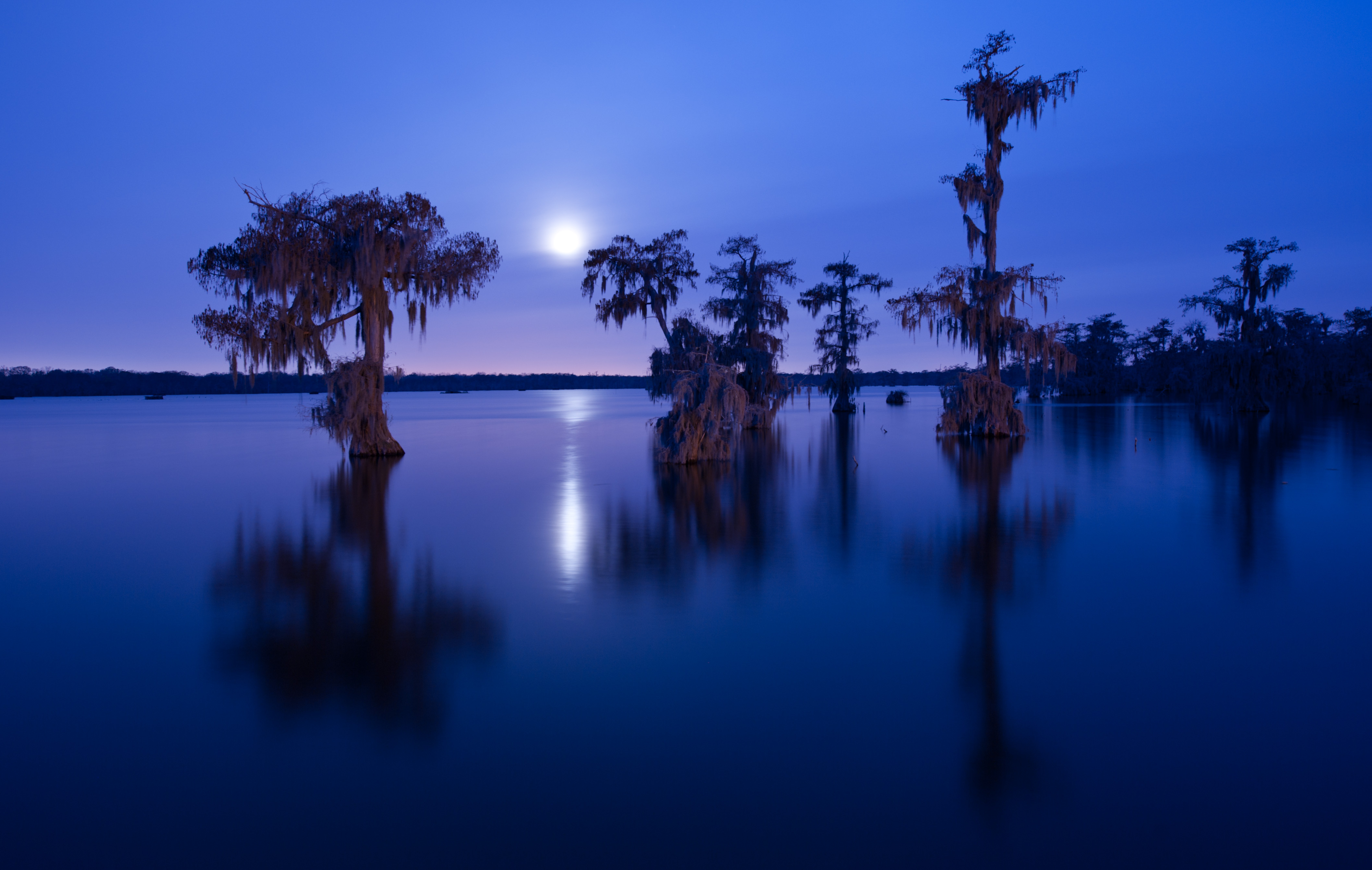

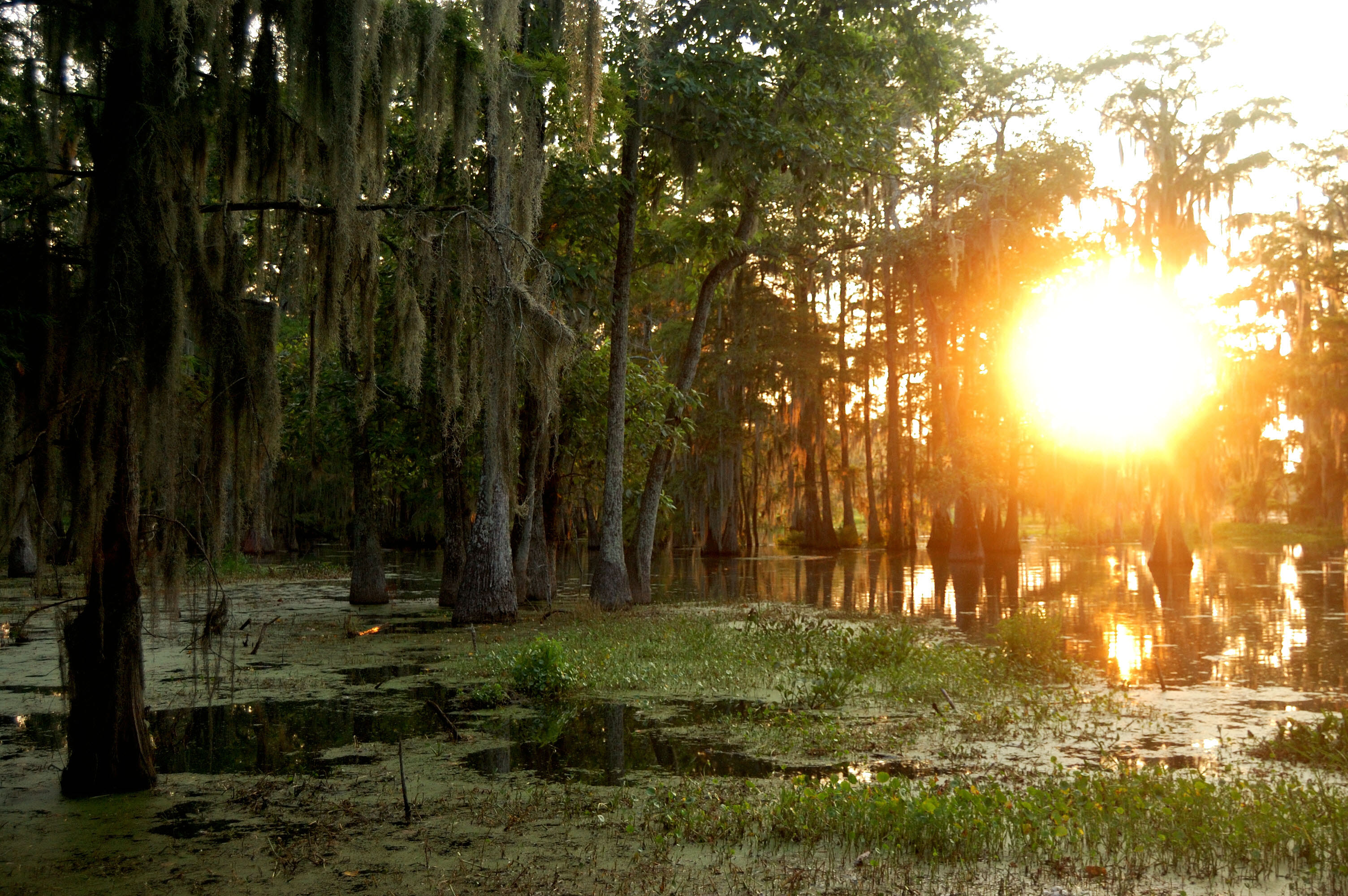

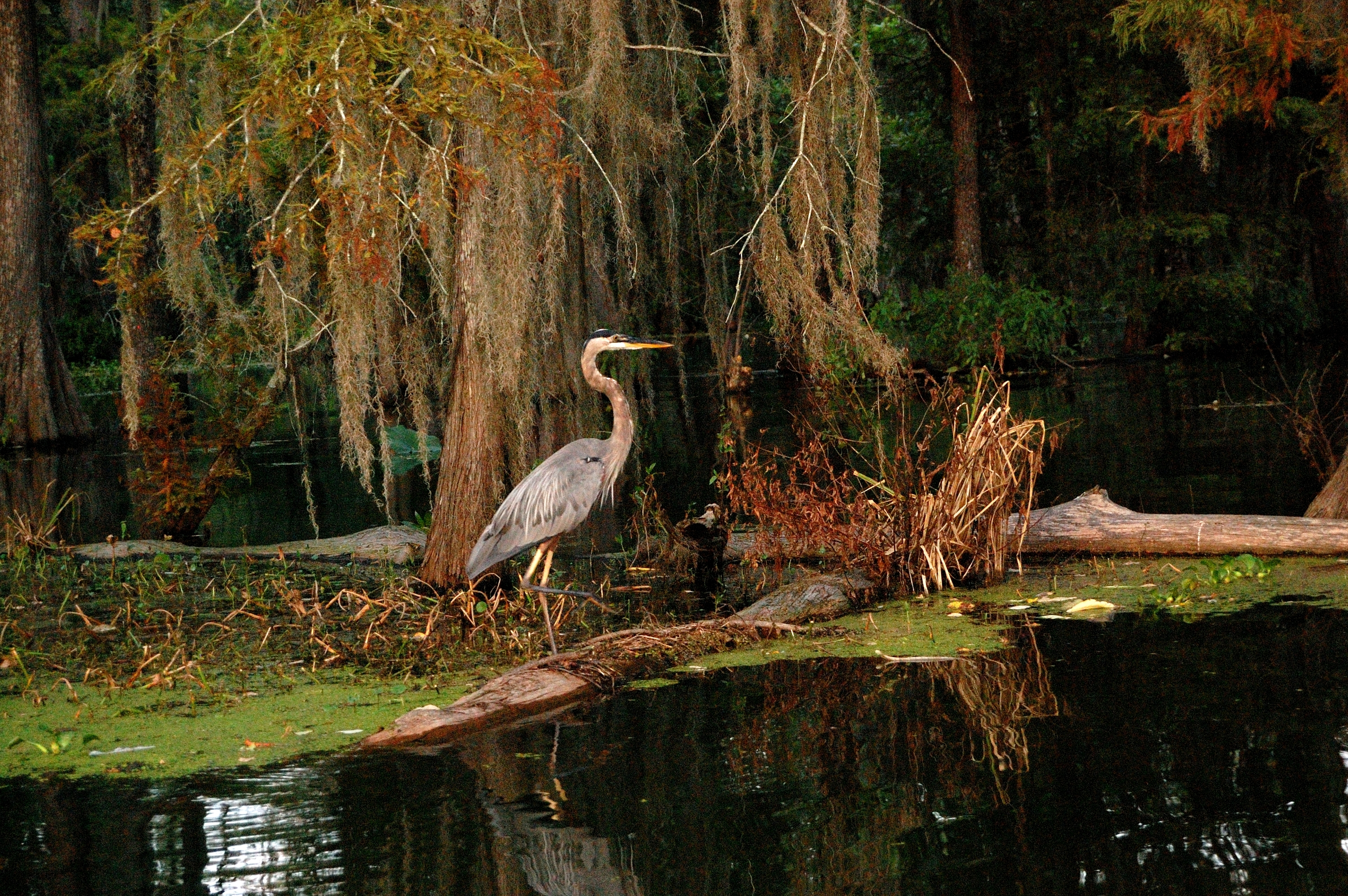

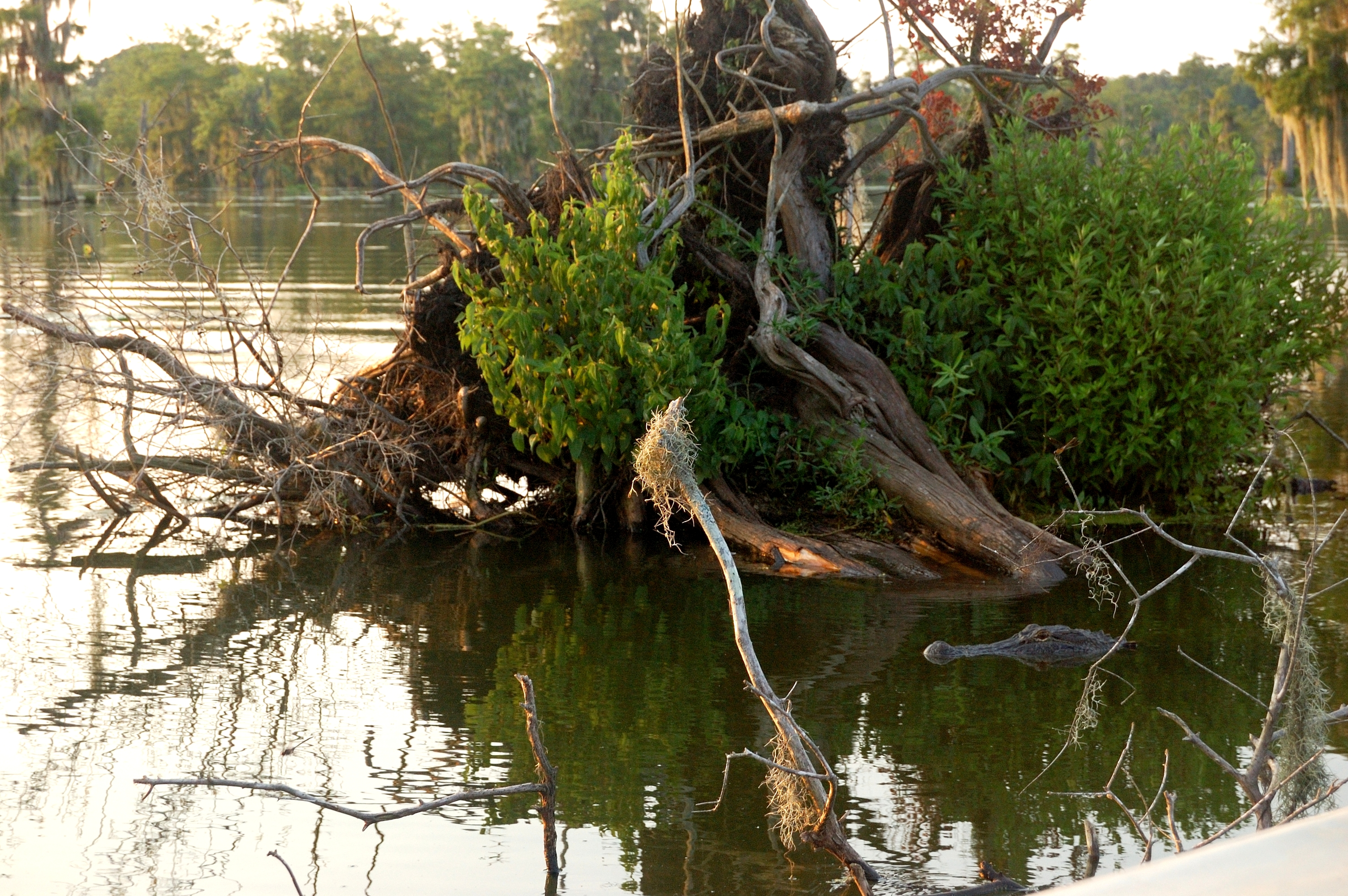

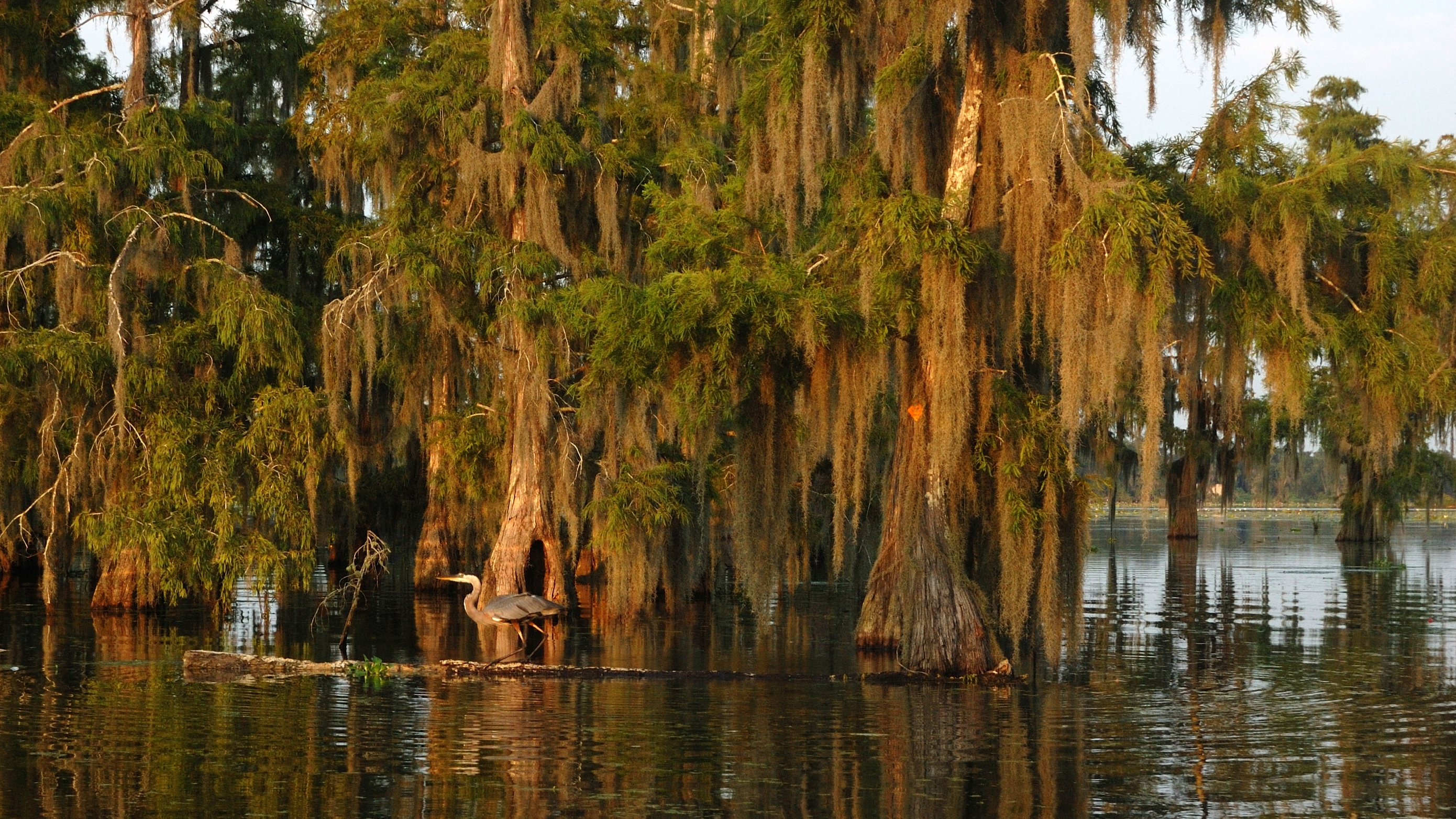

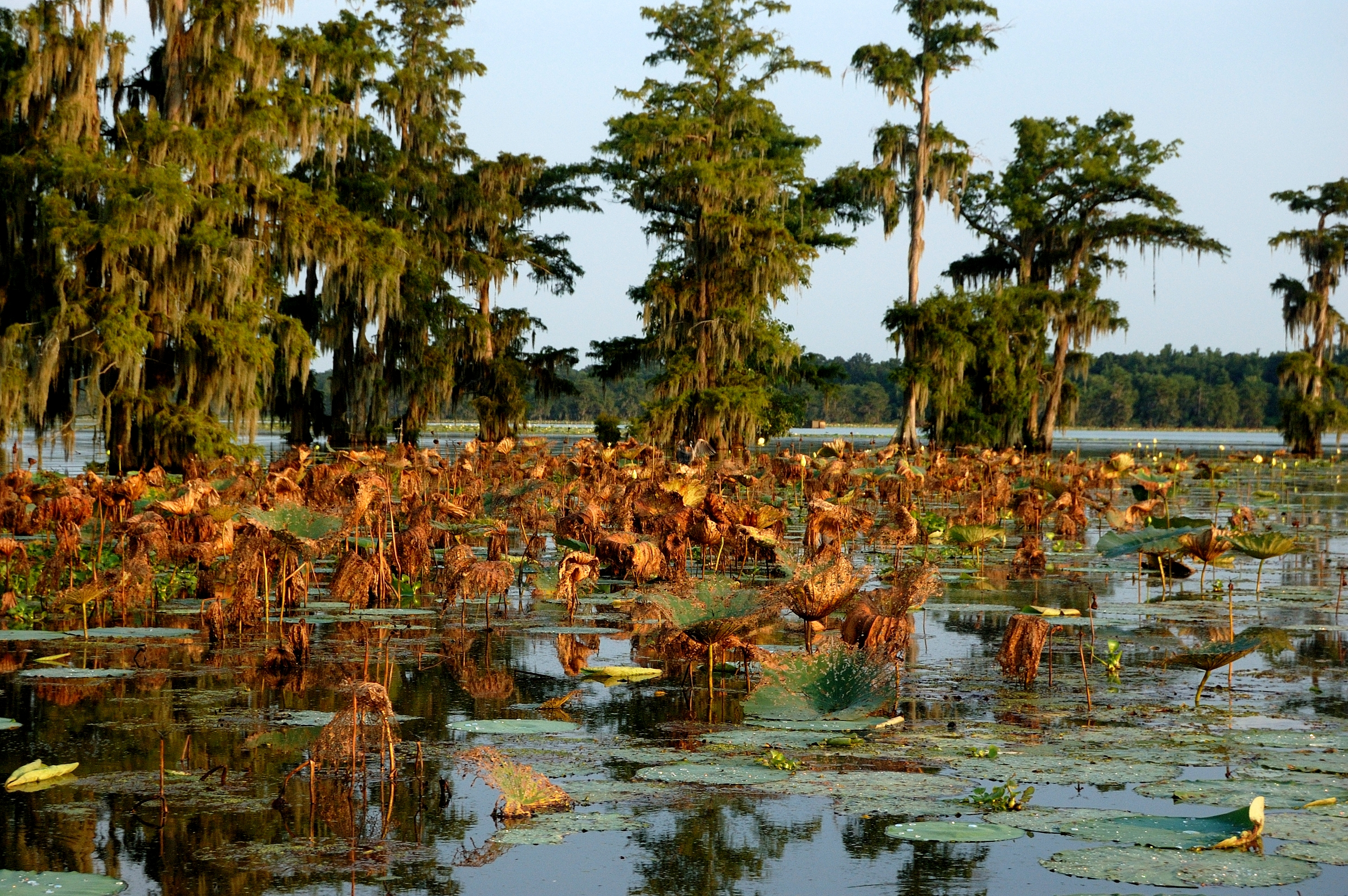

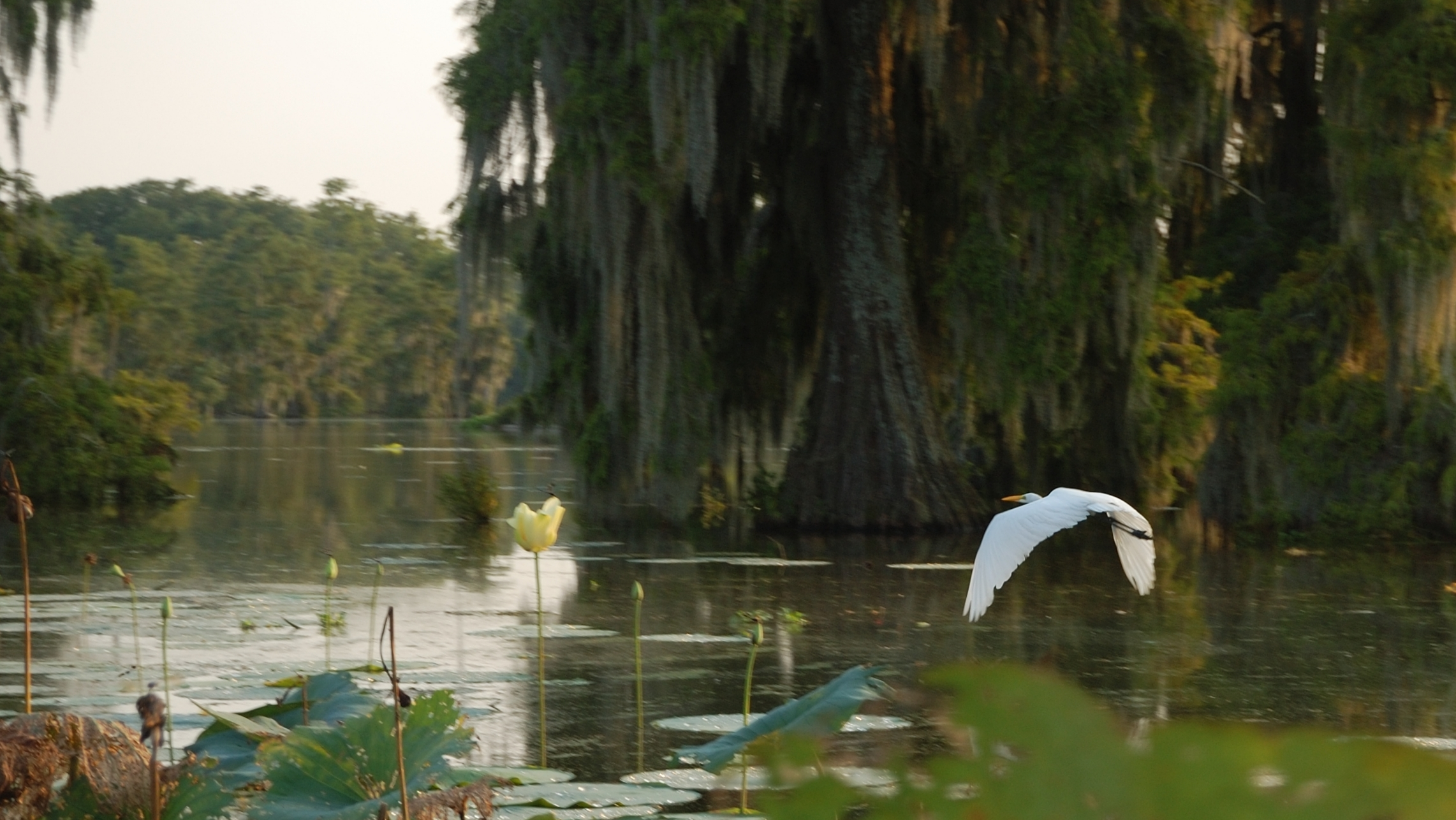

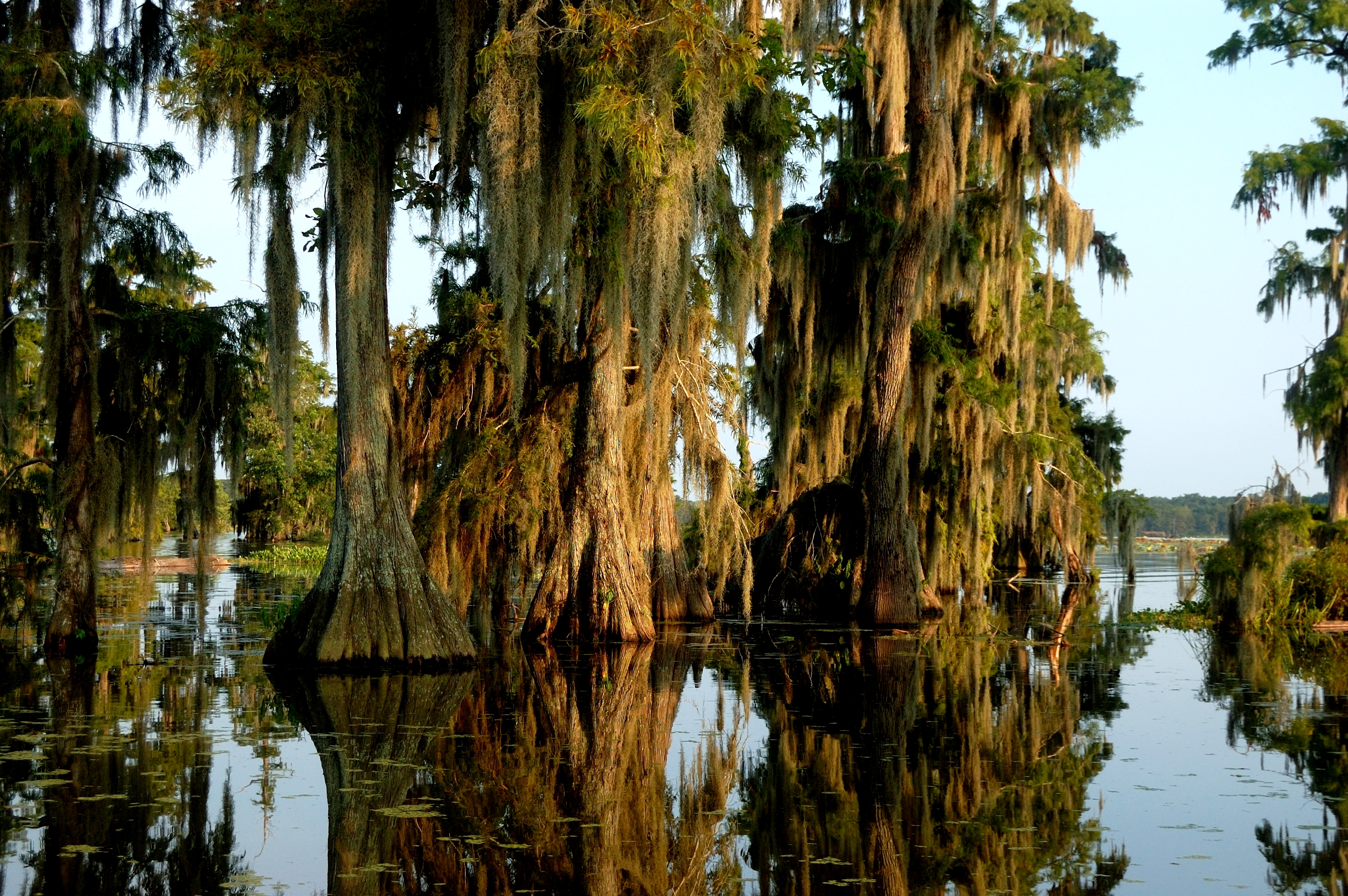

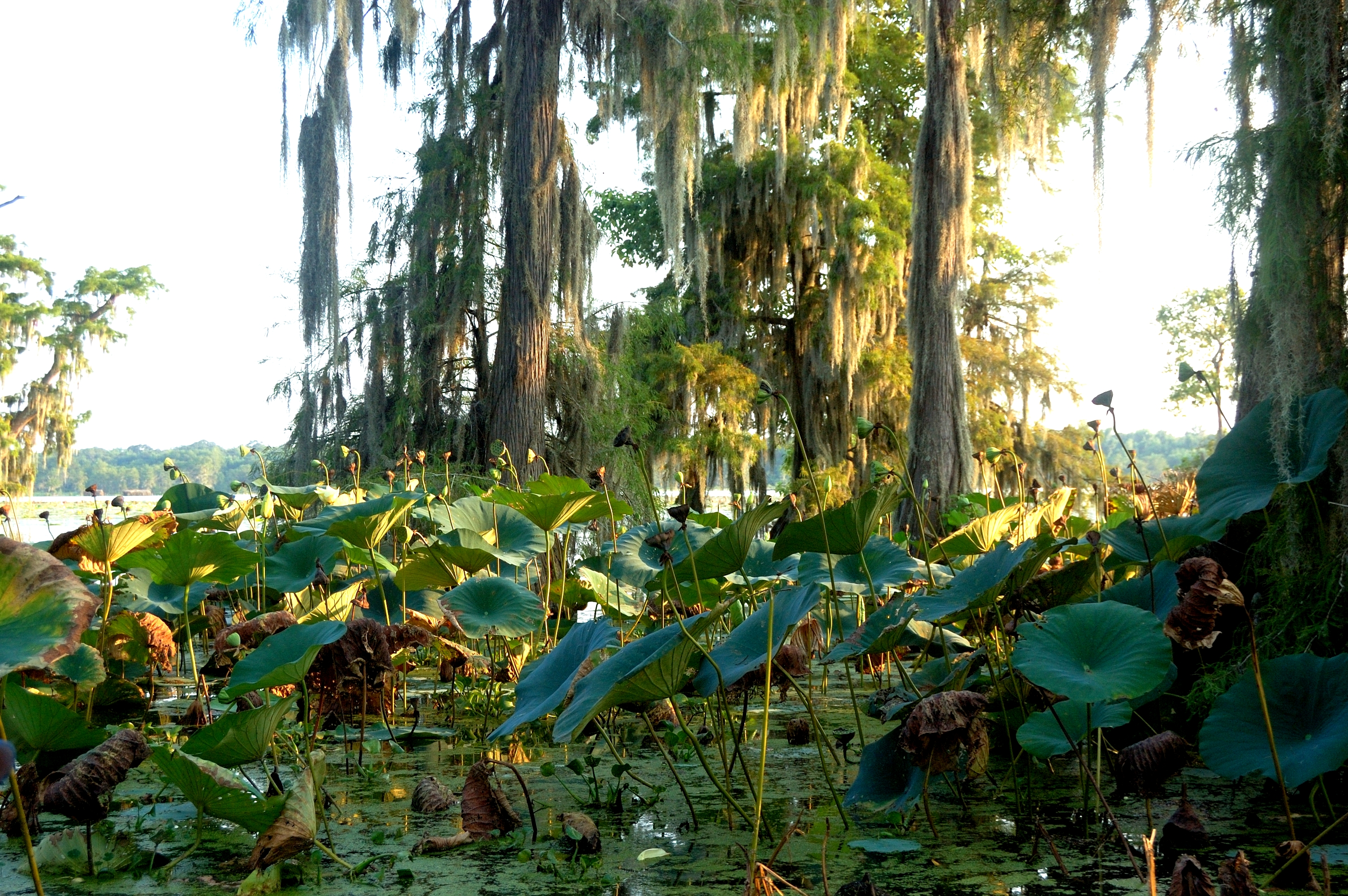

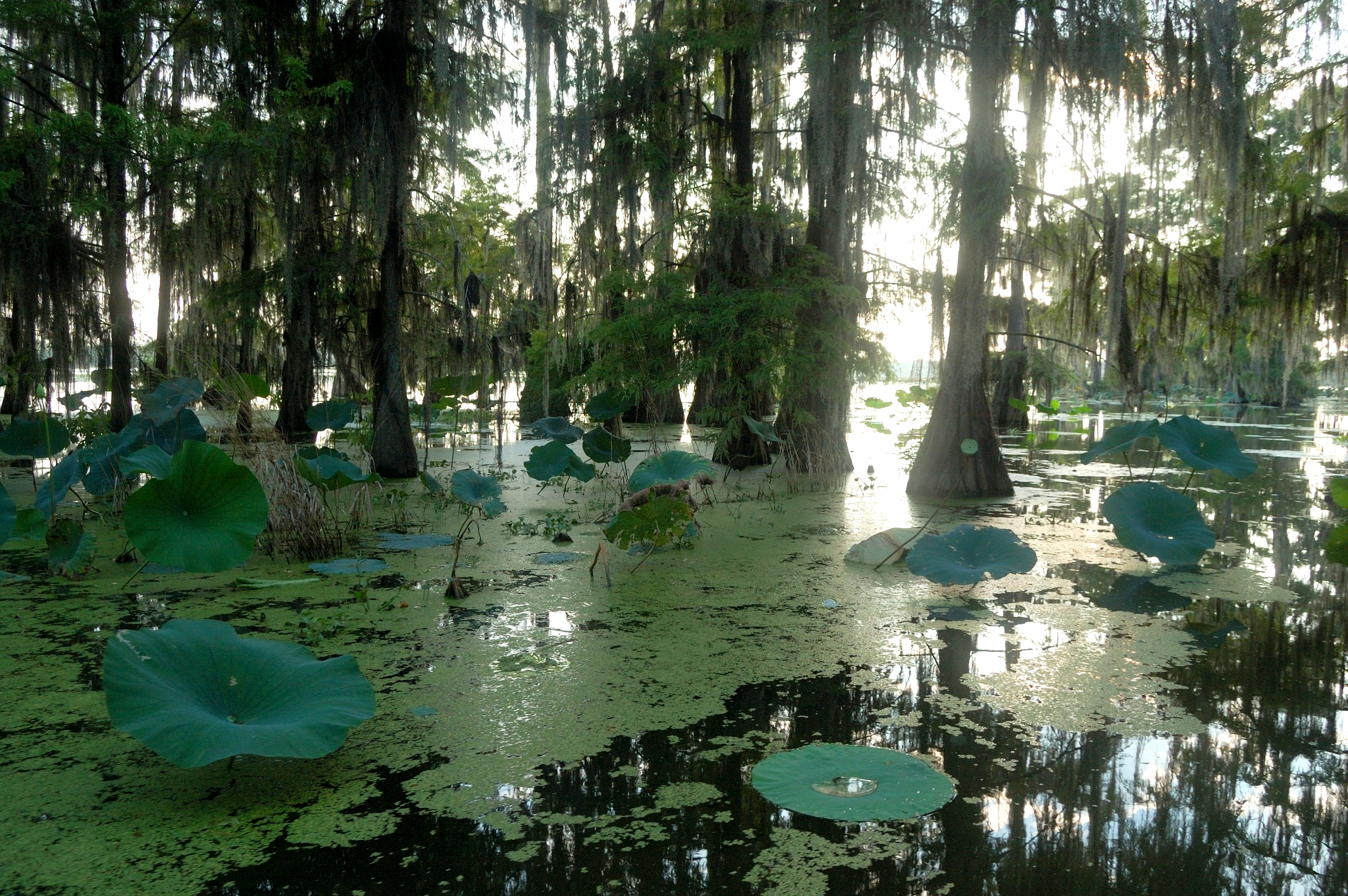

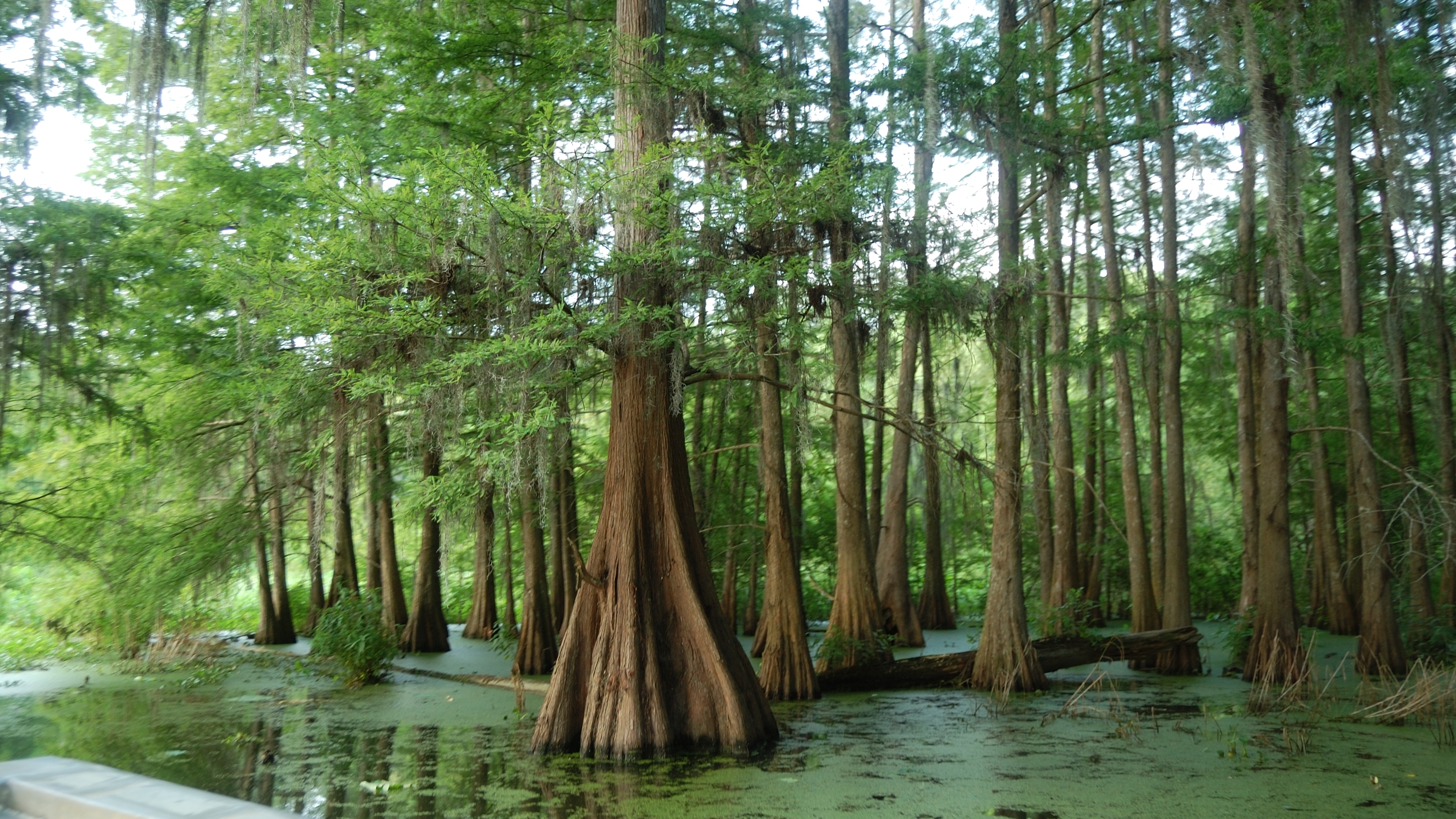

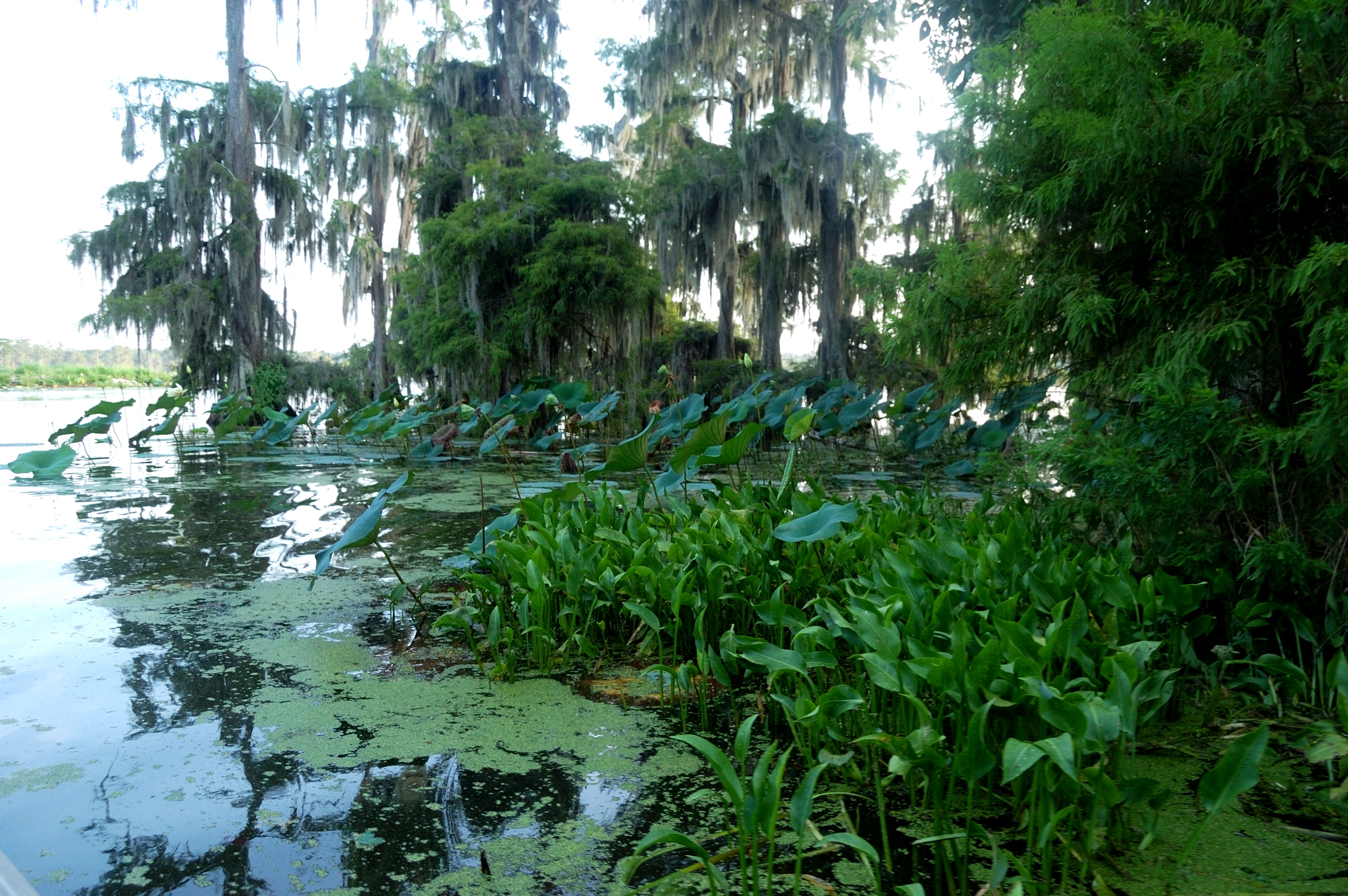

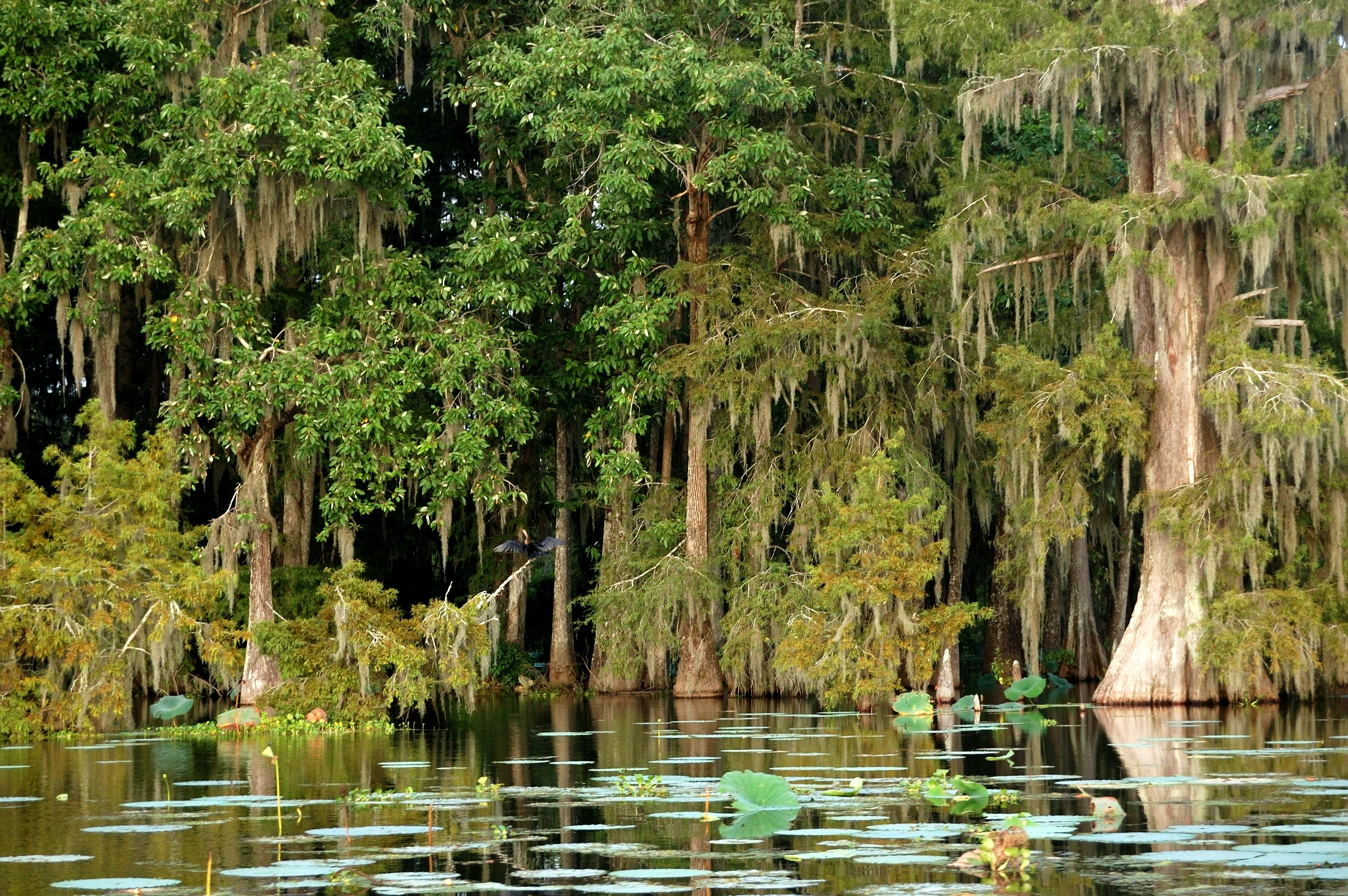

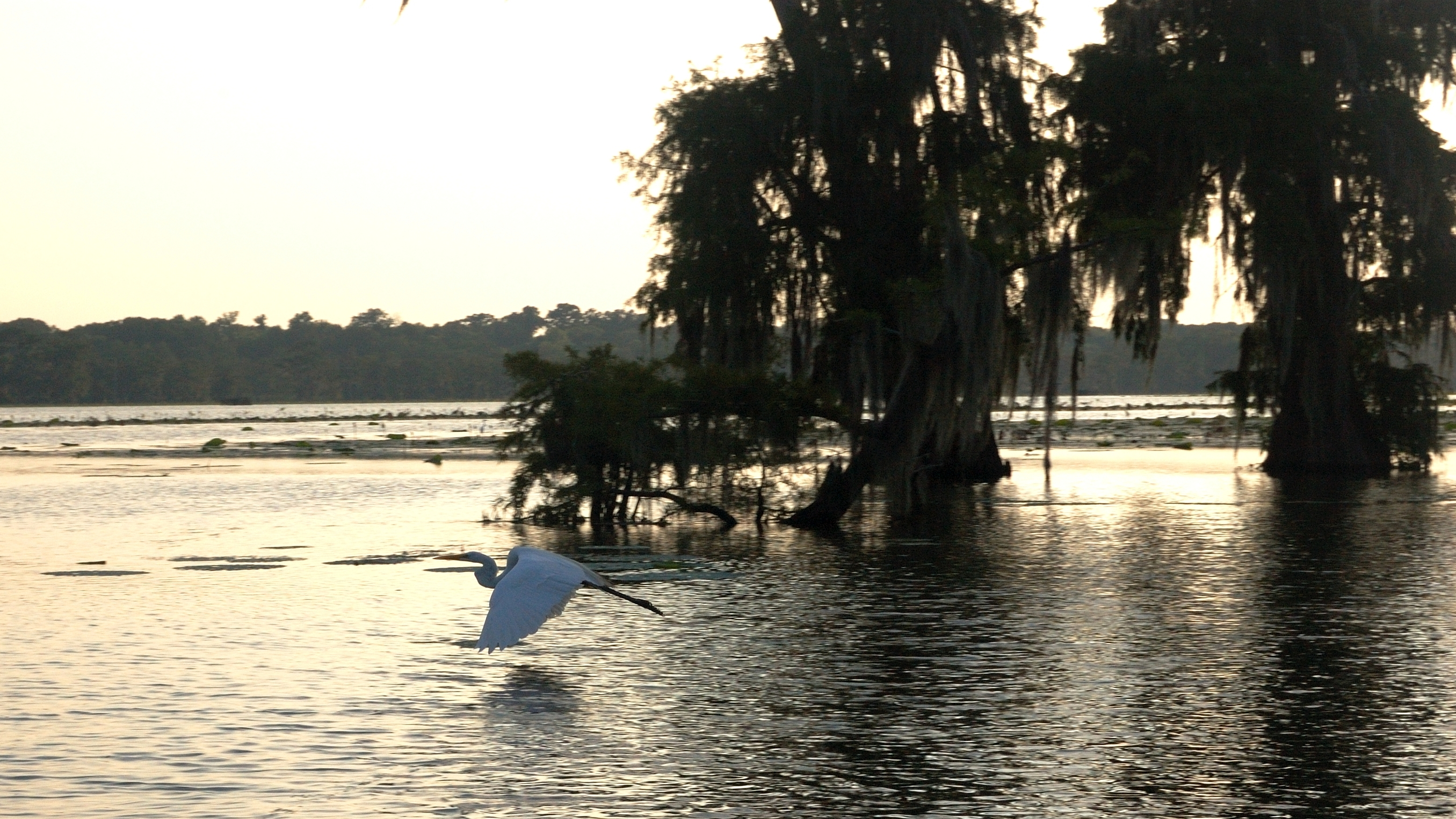
