= USS Diana =

Gunboat of the United States Navy

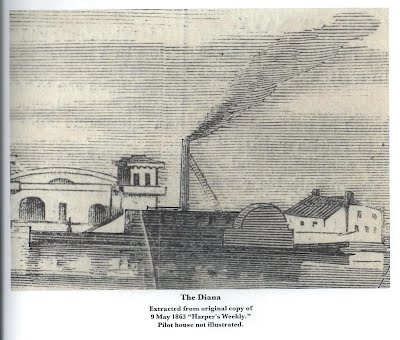
- CSS Diana (later, USS Diana)

History

United States
- In service: November 1862
- Out of service: 28 March 1863
- Captured: by Union Navy force; 27 April 1862
- Fate: Recaptured by Confederate forces, 28 March 1863

General characteristics
- Propulsion: steam engine; side-wheel propelled

USS Diana was a captured Confederate steamer acquired by the Union Navy from the prize court during the American Civil War. She was put into service by the Union Navy to patrol navigable waterways of the Confederacy to prevent the South from trading with other countries. Unfortunately for the Union Navy, she was again recaptured by the Confederate Navy.

== Service history ==
Diana, a side wheel merchant steamer, was captured by the Union Navy 27 April 1862 at New Orleans, Louisiana, and turned over on 7 May to General B. Butler, the Union Army commander of that area. She was employed by the Union Army mainly as a transport until November 1862 when she was returned for naval service, Acting Master Weeks in command. During her short naval career she assisted in the capture of two cargo vessels with sugar and molasses on board on 6 December 1862, and took part in an attack on the Confederate forces in Bayou Teche, Louisiana, and the destruction of the gunboat CSS J. A. Cotton 14 January 1863. Diana served with other ships of the Navy and detachments of the Army in Berwick Bay, Louisiana, until 28 March 1863 when she was captured by the Confederates while on a reconnaissance in Grand Lake and Atchafalaya River in Louisiana.
