= Berwick Bay =

Section of lower Atchafalaya River in Louisiana, United States

Coordinates: 29.7013°N 91.2172°W

Berwick Bay is the section of the Lower Atchafalaya River in Louisiana from Morgan City north to Sixmile Lake. U.S. Route 90 crosses Berwick Bay connecting the town of Berwick on the west bank of the Atchafalaya to Morgan City on the east bank. There is also a Southern Pacific vertical lift bridge connecting the two municipalities. This stretch of water lends its name to Vessel Traffic Service Berwick Bay which manages the waters south of 29°45' N., west of 91°10' W., north of 29°37' N., and east of 91°18' W. These waters include the junction of the Gulf Intracoastal Waterway, the Port Allen-Morgan City Alternate Route and several tributary bayous. Narrow bridge openings and a swift river current require one-way traffic flow through the bridges. VTS Berwick Bay is unique among United States Coast Guard Vessel Traffic Services because it maintains direct control of vessel traffic.
