= National Register of Historic Places listings in Iberia Parish, Louisiana =

Location of Iberia Parish in Louisiana

This is a list of the National Register of Historic Places listings in Iberia Parish, Louisiana.

This is intended to be a complete list of the properties and districts on the National Register of Historic Places in Iberia Parish, Louisiana, United States. The locations of National Register properties and districts for which the latitude and longitude coordinates are included below, may be seen in a map.

There are 34 properties and districts listed on the National Register in the parish, including 1 National Historic Landmark. Two properties were once listed, but have since been removed.

This National Park Service list is complete through NPS recent listings posted May 1, 2026.

== Current listings ==
	Name on the Register	Image	Date listed	Location	City or town	Description
1	Alice		June 14, 1984 (#84001291)	Along LA 87 about 2.3 miles (3.7 km) northwest of Jeanerette; 29°56′14″N 91°41′12″W	Jeanerette vicinity	Also known as "Agricole Fuselier Home" and the "Fuselier Plantation House".
2	Avery Island	Avery Island	September 4, 2018 (#100002249)	LA 329; 29°53′00″N 91°54′00″W	Avery Island	
3	Bayside	Bayside	January 29, 1987 (#86003747)	Along LA 87, about 1.7 miles (2.7 km) northwest of Jeanerette, Louisiana; 29°55′55″N 91°40′47″W	Jeanerette vicinity	
4	Armand Broussard House	Armand Broussard House	June 9, 1980 (#80001729)	1400 East Main Street; 29°59′42″N 91°47′50″W	New Iberia	Also known as Maison Broussard, (Note: National Register form erroneously names it Amant Broussard House and gives also a wrong common name. This because the house was probably mismatched with Mintmere, located in the same lot at the time of listing. See map attached to Mintmere registration form.) the house was moved into Vermilionville Historic Village of Lafayette Parish some time after its enlistment. The house was rededicated on May 11, 2013.
5	Citizens Bank		June 17, 2025 (#100011969)	1320-24 Main Street; 29°54′51″N 91°39′58″W	Jeanerette	
6	Conrad Rice Mill	Conrad Rice Mill	November 10, 1982 (#82000437)	307 Ann Street; 29°59′53″N 91°48′40″W	New Iberia	
7	Downtown New Iberia Commercial Historic District	Downtown New Iberia Commercial Historic District	December 13, 2017 (#100001710)	Roughly bounded by Fulton Street, Burke Street, Weeks Street, St. Peter Street and Jefferson Street; 30°00′23″N 91°49′10″W	New Iberia	
8	Dulcito Plantation House		July 22, 1994 (#94000742)	5918 West Old Spanish Trail (LA 182); 30°03′53″N 91°52′38″W	New Iberia vicinity	
9	East Main Street Historic District		July 28, 1983 (#83000507)	East Main Street, Lee Street, Ann Street and Philip Street; 30°00′06″N 91°48′40″W	New Iberia	
10	Enterprise Plantation		March 17, 1975 (#75000848)	About 3.5 miles (5.6 km) west of Jeanerette, off US 90; 29°54′28″N 91°43′19″W	Jeanerette vicinity	
11	Episcopal Church of the Epiphany	Episcopal Church of the Epiphany	April 29, 1977 (#77000670)	303 West Main Street; 30°00′31″N 91°49′17″W	New Iberia	
12	Auguste Erath Building	Auguste Erath Building	October 5, 1995 (#95001156)	333-335 West St. Peter Street; 30°00′31″N 91°49′22″W	New Iberia	
13	Evangeline Theater	Evangeline Theater	February 18, 1999 (#99000234)	129 East Main Street; 30°00′19″N 91°49′02″W	New Iberia	Also part of Downtown New Iberia Commercial Historic District since its creation on December 13, 2017.
14	First Church of God in Christ		March 17, 2025 (#100011525)	700 Pellerin Street; 29°54′49″N 91°40′34″W	Jeanerette	
15	First United Methodist Church	First United Methodist Church	November 16, 1989 (#89002002)	119 Jefferson Street; 30°00′29″N 91°49′17″W	New Iberia	Also part of Downtown New Iberia Commercial Historic District since its creation on December 13, 2017.
16	Hewes House	Hewes House	January 19, 2005 (#04001515)	1617 Main Street; 29°55′04″N 91°40′12″W	Jeanerette	
17	Joseph Jefferson House	Joseph Jefferson House	June 4, 1973 (#73000867)	End of Rip Van Winkle Road, about 2 miles (3.2 km) north of Delcambre; 29°58′32″N 91°58′25″W	Jefferson Island	Also known as Bob Acres Plantation and Rip Van Winkle House and Gardens, it was designed and built in 1870 by actor Joseph Jefferson.
18	LeJeune's Bakery	LeJeune's Bakery	April 22, 2003 (#03000287)	1510 Main Street; 29°54′59″N 91°40′04″W	Jeanerette	
19	Lutzenberger Foundry and Pattern Shop Building	Lutzenberger Foundry and Pattern Shop Building	March 12, 1998 (#98000228)	502 and 505 Jane Street; 30°00′43″N 91°49′19″W	New Iberia	Also known as the New Iberia Foundry & Machine Shop.
20	The Magnolias	The Magnolias	December 6, 1979 (#79001065)	115 Jefferson Street; 30°00′29″N 91°49′16″W	New Iberia	
21	Mintmere		June 6, 1980 (#80001730)	1400 East Main Street; 29°59′44″N 91°47′50″W	New Iberia	Also known as Roy Boucvalt House
22	NEW IBERIA (steamboat) shipwreck	NEW IBERIA (steamboat) shipwreck	December 24, 2008 (#08001214)	Address restricted	New Iberia	Also part of Downtown New Iberia Commercial Historic District since its creation on December 13, 2017.
23	New Iberia High School	New Iberia High School	March 17, 1994 (#94000236)	415 Center Street; 29°59′59″N 91°49′11″W	New Iberia	
24	Olivier Store	Olivier Store	October 25, 1982 (#82000438)	6811 Weeks Island Road (LA 83); 29°55′10″N 91°47′55″W	Lydia	
25	Pascal Building	Pascal Building	November 21, 1985 (#85003054)	223 East Main Street; 30°00′17″N 91°48′59″W	New Iberia	Also part of Downtown New Iberia Commercial Historic District since its creation on December 13, 2017.
26	People's National Bank		March 22, 2006 (#06000146)	119 West Main Street; 30°00′23″N 91°49′08″W	New Iberia	Also part of Downtown New Iberia Commercial Historic District since its creation on December 13, 2017.
27	Andrew Romero House		October 30, 1989 (#89001855)	310 Marie Street; 30°00′19″N 91°48′50″W	New Iberia	Also known as Alvarez House
28	Shadows-on-the-Teche	Shadows-on-the-Teche	October 5, 1972 (#72000553)	317 East Main Street; 30°00′16″N 91°48′56″W	New Iberia	Also part of East Main Street Historic District since its creation on July 28, 1983. The Greek Revival home was completed in 1834 on the Bayou Teche by wealthy planters David and Mary Weeks, within the town of New Iberia. It remained in the Weeks family until 1958, when William Weeks Hall died and donated the building to the National Trust for Historic Preservation. Open for tours.
29	MV Sheherazade		December 7, 2018 (#100002555)	Address Restricted	Morgan City vicinity	shipwreck and remains
30	Southern Pacific Railroad Depot	Southern Pacific Railroad Depot	November 30, 1987 (#87002082)	402 West Washington Street; 30°00′31″N 91°49′26″W	New Iberia	
31	Steamboat House	Steamboat House	July 27, 1979 (#79001066)	623 East Main Street; 30°00′05″N 91°48′37″W	New Iberia	Also part of East Main Street Historic District since its creation on July 28, 1983.
32	John R. Taylor Drugstore	John R. Taylor Drugstore	January 22, 1996 (#95001563)	145 West Main Street; 30°00′25″N 91°49′11″W	New Iberia	Also part of Downtown New Iberia Commercial Historic District since its creation on December 13, 2017.
33	Vida Shaw Bridge	Vida Shaw Bridge	July 6, 2010 (#10000419)	On Vida Shaw Road (Parish Road 402), near intersection with Parish Road 608; 30°01′58″N 91°44′13″W	Loreauville vicinity	
34	Wormser's Department Store	Wormser's Department Store	October 5, 1995 (#95001158)	112 East Main Street; 30°00′19″N 91°49′05″W	New Iberia	Also part of Downtown New Iberia Commercial Historic District since its creation on December 13, 2017.

== Former listings ==
	Name on the Register	Image	Date listed	Date removed	Location	City or town	Description
1	Darby Plantation	Darby Plantation	March 26, 1973 (#73000868)	January 31, 2019	Along Darby Lane, about 2.1 miles (3.4 km) northwest of downtown New Iberia; 30°01′51″N 91°50′05″W	New Iberia	Original building burned and replaced with a replica
2	Santiago Lamperez House	Santiago Lamperez House	October 17, 1985 (#85003147)	November 29, 2016	203 Front Street; 30°00′28″N 91°49′03″W	New Iberia	Destroyed by fire in 2002.

== See also ==
- List of National Historic Landmarks in Louisiana
- National Register of Historic Places listings in Louisiana
