= Alice (Jeanerette, Louisiana) =

- Alice Plantation House
- U.S. National Register of Historic Places
- Location within Louisiana
- Nearest city: Jeanerette, Louisiana, U.S.
- Coordinates: 29°56′14″N 91°41′13″W
- Area: 0.2 acres (0.081 ha)
- Built: 1816
- Architectural style: Louisiana Creole
- NRHP reference No.: 84001291
- Added to NRHP: June 14, 1984

Alice Plantation House, also known as the Fuselier Plantation House, is a historic house in Jeanerette, Louisiana, U.S.. It was built in 1816 for the Fuselier family as part of a sugar plantation. It is listed on the National Register of Historic Places since June 14, 1984. The house was designed in the Creole architectural style. This plantation was worked by enslaved people.

== History ==
The house was built near Baldwin in St. Martin Parish in 1816, for Agricole Fuselier de la Claire, the son of Gabriel Fuselier de la Claire, a large landowner whose first wife Jeanne was the daughter of Jacques Roman, the owner of the Oak Alley Plantation. Agricole Fuselier lived here with his wife, Christine Berard. He served as a lieutenant in the state militia, and he became a sugar planter. He owned slaves.

The house was moved near Jeanerette in Iberia Parish in 1961. By the 1980s, it still belonged to the Fuselier family.

== See also ==
- List of plantations in Louisiana
- National Register of Historic Places listings in Iberia Parish, Louisiana
