= Bienville =

Bienville may refer to:

== People ==
- Jean-Baptiste Le Moyne de Bienville (1680–1767), French colonial administrator in New France
- Pierre Joseph Céloron de Blainville or Celeron de Bienville (1693–1759), French colonial explorer of the Ohio Valley

== Places ==
- Bienville, Louisiana, U.S.
  - Bienville Parish, Louisiana, U.S.
- Bienville, Oise, France
- Bienville National Forest in Mississippi, U.S.
- Lake Bienville, in Quebec, Canada

== Other uses ==
- USS Bienville, an American Civil War paddle steamer
- Bienville House, a hotel in New Orleans, Louisiana, U.S.
- Bienville University, a diploma mill in Baton Rouge, Louisiana, U.S.
