= Dickson Manufacturing Company =

American manufacturing company

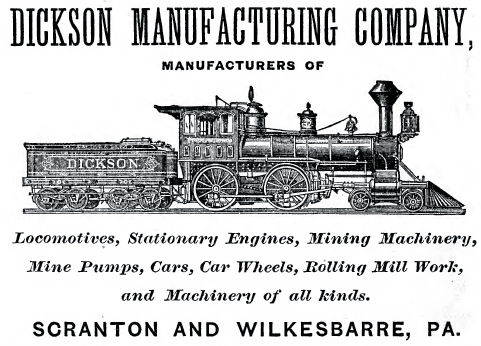
Dickson advertisement from the 1870s

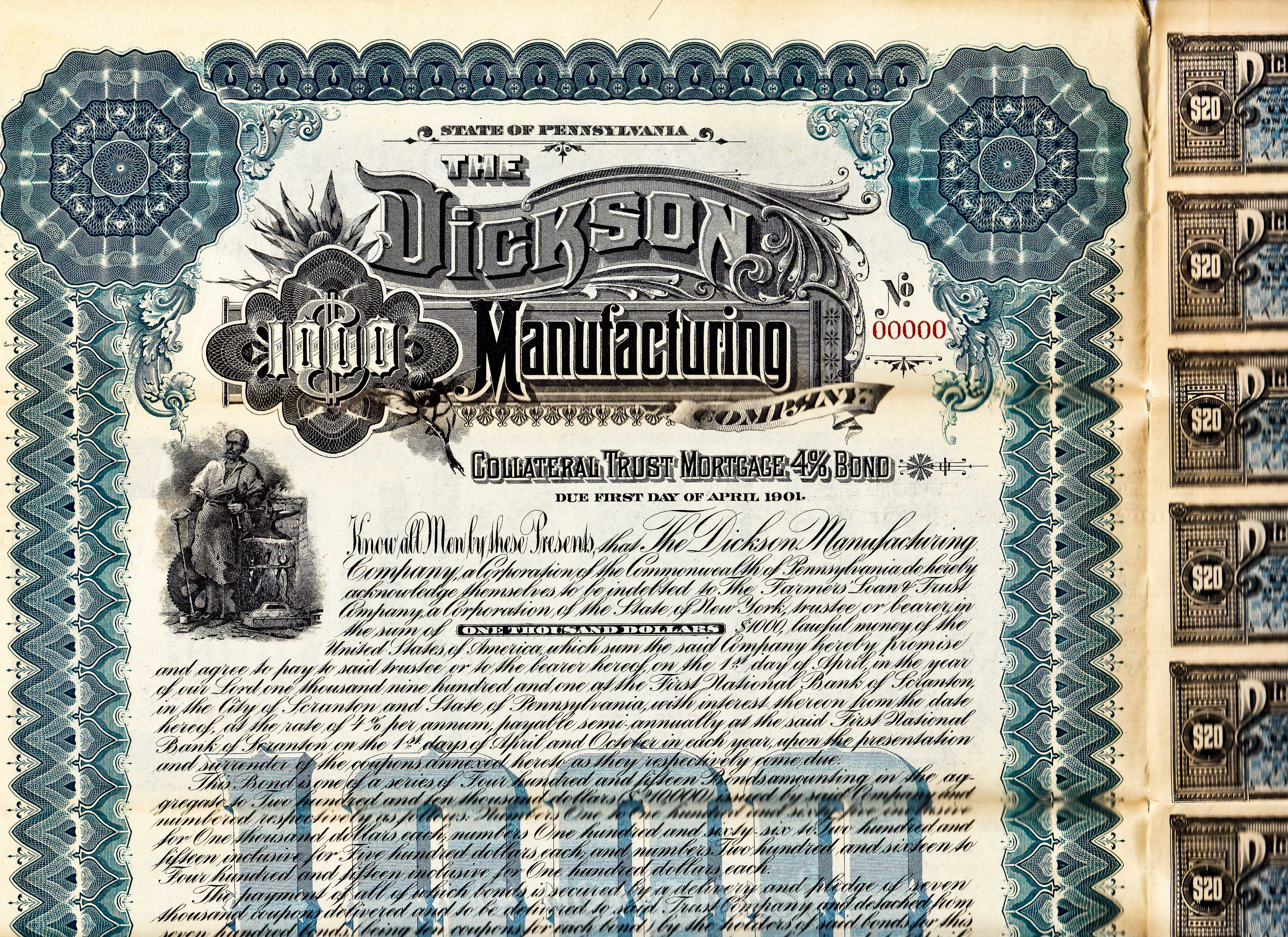
1896 Company Bond Certificate

Dickson Manufacturing Company was an American manufacturer of boilers, blast furnaces and steam engines used in various industries but most known in railway steam locomotives. The company also designed and constructed steam powered mine cable hoists. It was founded in Scranton, Pennsylvania by Thomas Dickson in 1856. In total, the company produced 1,334 steam locomotives until it was taken over by ALCO in 1901.

== History ==
=== Precursor company ===
In 1855, Thomas Dickson, with his brothers John and George, founded an engineering company named Dickson & Company in Carbondale, Pennsylvania. A year later it was moved to the newly incorporated Scranton, Pennsylvania, at the request of George Scranton. Their first major contract was to supply locomotives for a new railroad constructed by the Delaware and Hudson Canal Company. By 1862, business was booming and the company was re-incorporated as the Dickson Manufacturing Company.

=== Formation ===
The company maintained its main offices and shops on Penn Avenue in Scranton,. The Cliff Works, a locomotive manufacturing company on Cliff Street in Scranton was acquired in 1862. In 1866, a foundry in Wilkes-Barre, was added and later the company opened an office in New York City.

In the first years as the Dickson Manufacturing Company, five or six locomotives were being built each year. By the early 1870s, this had risen to five locomotives a month. They also built railroad cars and a variety of mining machinery. In 1882, they rebuilt their Penn Avenue shops, creating 29,000 square feet of space. The company continued to expand and by 1890 its shops covered six acres and employed more than 1,200 workers.

=== Acquisition ===
On June 24, 1901, the company's locomotive division was merged with seven other manufacturing firms to form American Locomotive Company (ALCO); the rest of the company became part of Allis-Chalmers. ALCO ceased locomotive production at the former Dickson works in 1909.

=== Recent history ===
The former shops still stand, and are featured in the opening sequence of the television show "The Office," which is set in Scranton.

== Preserved Dickson locomotives ==
The following locomotives (in serial number order) built by Dickson have been preserved.

Serial number	Wheel arrangement (Whyte notation)	Build date	Operational owner(s)	Disposition
1005	0-6-2T	August 1898	J. B. Levert #5	Enterprise Plantation, Patoutville, Louisiana
1020	2-4-0T	1898	Pacific Railroad (Ferrocarril al Pacífico)	Pacific Station, Costa Rica
1280	0-4-4T	October 1901	M.A. Patout & Sons / Six Flags Over Texas (operational)	Enterprise Plantation, Patoutville, Louisiana
30196	0-4-0T	September 1904	Acosta Brothers	Homenaje A Goldmine, Costa Rica

This surviving locomotive, named "Stephanie", was restored to operating condition, in 1979 under a lease deal, by Winson George, of Brookhaven, MS. He operated the locomotive in his backyard until his death in October 1993, at which time the locomotive was returned to M.A. Patout & Sons

One notable change to the locomotive was the larger water tank on the extended frame.

The surviving locomotive (1280) was purchased by the Patout sugar mill (Enterprise) in 1901 and named Mary Ann. Leased to Six Flags Over Texas and remains there currently. The locomotive is now named The General Sam Houston.

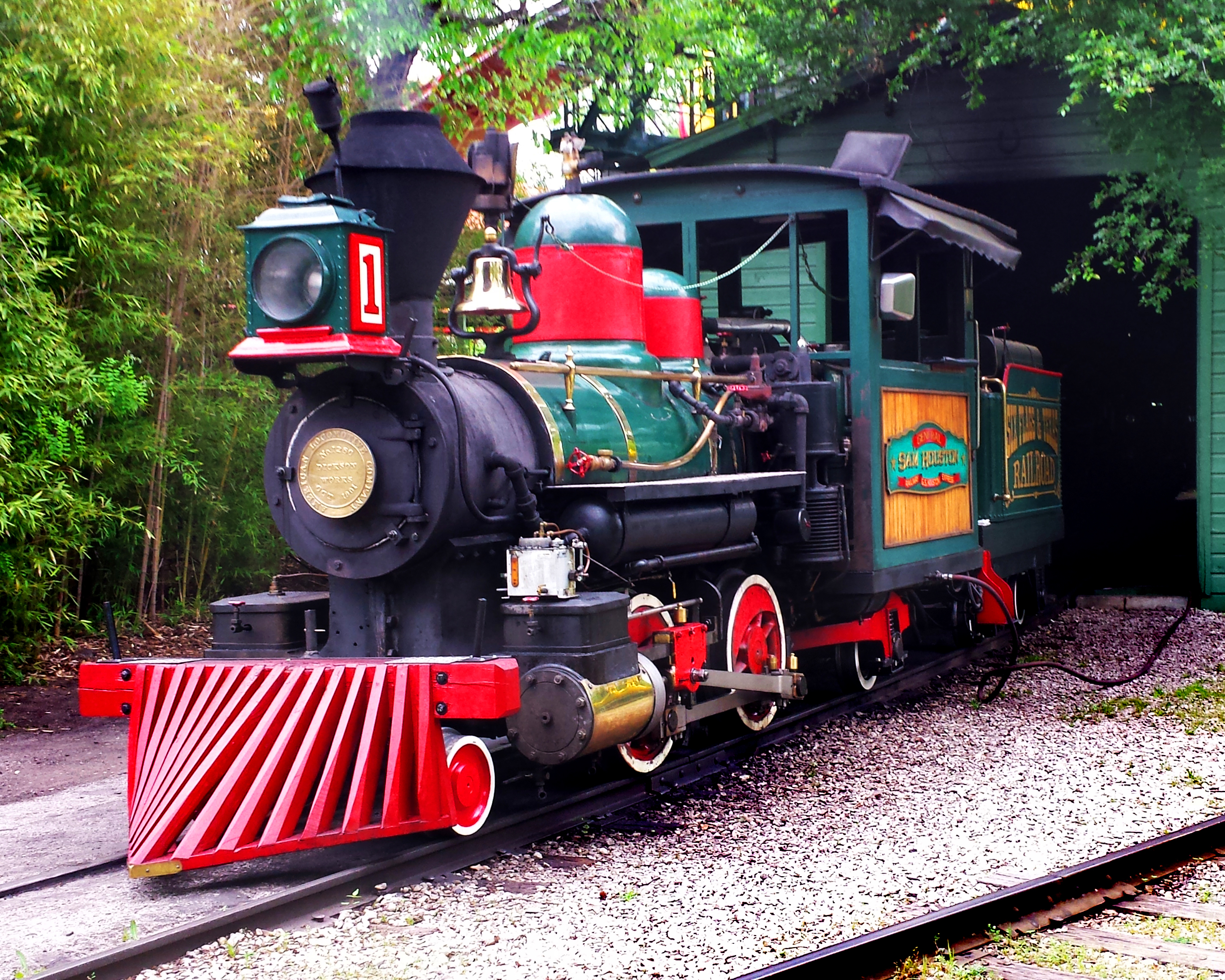
General Sam Houston - 1901 Dickson (ALCO) Locomotive at Six Flags Over Texas

The restored locomotive Serial # 30196 is displayed at the "Monumento al minero en Las Juntas de Abangare" (Parque Central), Juntas, Guanacaste, Costa Rica (the serial number 30196 is in the ALCO sequence, not the original Dickson serial number sequence).

== See also ==
- List of locomotive builders
- Delaware, Lackawanna and Western Railroad Yard-Dickson Manufacturing Co. Site
