= Dulcito Plantation =

Historic house in Louisiana, United States

- Dulcito Plantation House
- U.S. National Register of Historic Places
- Location within Louisiana Location within the United States
- Location: 5918 West Old Spanish Trail (LA 182)
- Nearest city: New Iberia, Louisiana
- Coordinates: 30°03′53″N 91°52′38″W
- Area: less than one acre
- Built: c.1850
- Architectural style: French Creole
- NRHP reference No.: 94000742
- Added to NRHP: July 22, 1994

The Dulcito Plantation is a historic house built c. 1850, and formally was a Southern sugar plantation, located at 5918 West Old Spanish Trail (LA 182) near New Iberia, Louisiana. This is one of the few remaining buildings of the area that highlights the pre-Civil War architectural heritage, despite having some alterations. The house was listed on the National Register of Historic Places on July 22, 1994.

== History ==
Settlement of what would later become the Iberia Parish began in the mid-eighteenth century, and by the end of the century the area was well-populated around Spanish Lake and Bayou Teche. In June 1797, Jacques Fontenette petitioned the Spanish governmental authorities to acquire the tract of land where Dulcito is now located.

The exact date of the structure is unknown, and there had been rumors of it being built in the late 18th century. The current estimated built date of this house is c. 1850, and is based on the architectural evidence of the use of circular sawn timbers and bond brick basement. The plantation house is a 1 1/2-story frame structure, built mainly in French Creole style.

In April and May 1863 during the Bayou Teche campaign, and again in October of the same year during the Great Texas Overland Expedition, the house remained in possession of the Federal authorities. It was also used as a temporary field hospital for Confederate soldiers. After the American Civil War, the land and house were owned by James L. Burke. Later it was owned by Elias A.Pharr (starting in October 1882), and B.F. Trappey and Sons, Inc. (starting in 1949). In 1954, the Trappey family started the process of modernizing the structure.

For many years, Bernard Trappey and his sons hosted a hot pepper eating contest at Dulcito Plantation; and he often surprising locals with his Habanero peppers (at a time when jalapeño peppers were more common).

== Modern day ==
Despite some alterations, the house still maintain its historical relevance. It is one of the remaining buildings that represents Iberia Parish's pre-Civil War architectural heritage.

In 2017, the house and 54 acres of land were put on sale for $3,200,000 USD. The landscaping around the house includes old Magnolia trees and ancient oak trees.

== See also ==
- List of plantations in Louisiana
- National Register of Historic Places listings in Iberia Parish, Louisiana
