= Bayside (Jeanerette, Louisiana) =

Historic house in Louisiana, United States

- U.S. National Register of Historic Places
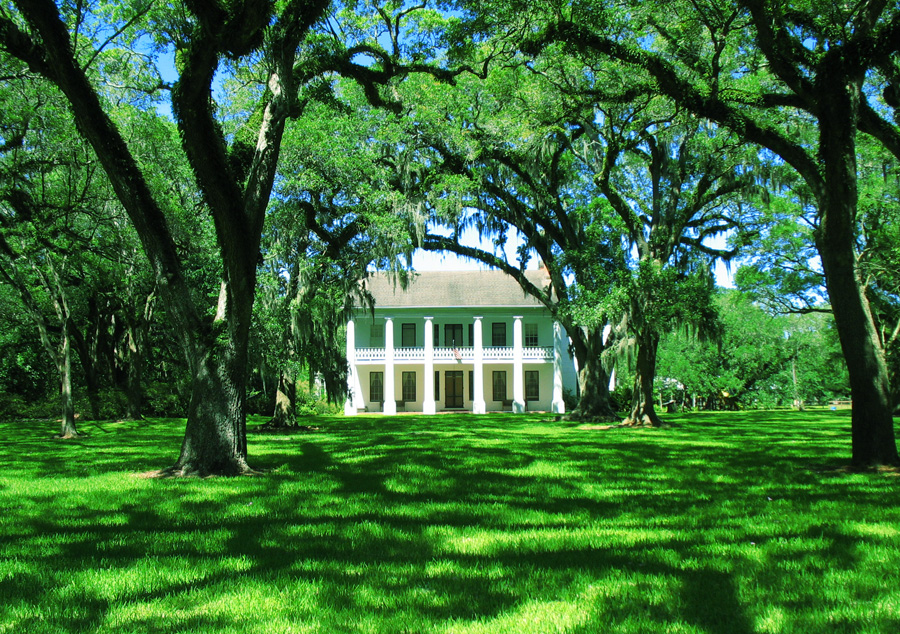
- Bayside Plantation Home

- Location within Louisiana Location within the United States
- Location: Along LA 87, about 1.7 miles (2.7 km) northwest of Jeanerette, Louisiana
- Coordinates: 29°55′55″N 91°40′47″W
- Area: 6 acres (2.4 ha)
- Built: 1850
- Architect: Francis D. Richardson
- Architectural style: Greek Revival, Central hall
- NRHP reference No.: 86003747
- Added to NRHP: January 29, 1987

Bayside is plantation comprising a historic plantation house built in 1850 by Francis DuBose Richardson on the Bayou Teche near Jeanerette, Louisiana, United States. Richardson, a classmate and friend of Edgar Allan Poe, purchased the land for a sugar plantation.

Richardson attended St. Mary's College in Baltimore, Maryland. He was elected to the Louisiana Senate and sponsored legislation establishing the Louisiana School for the Blind, which institution is extant in Baton Rouge. His daughter, Bethia Richardson, married Donelson Caffery II, a Louisiana State Senator and a United States Senator. Richardson's great grandson, Patrick Thomson Caffery served as a Louisiana State Representative and a United States Representative.

Despite some alterations and an unclear architectural development, the two-story brick central hall Greek Revival plantation house remains one of Iberia Parish's finest Greek Revival structures. The house has the largest screened porch in Louisiana.

The house and surrounding 6 acres (2.4 ha) area was listed on the National Register of Historic Places on January 29, 1987.

== See also ==
- List of plantations in Louisiana
- National Register of Historic Places listings in Iberia Parish, Louisiana
