= First United Methodist Church (New Iberia, Louisiana) =

Historic church in Louisiana, United States

- First Methodist Church of New Iberia
- U.S. National Register of Historic Places
- U.S. Historic district – Contributing property
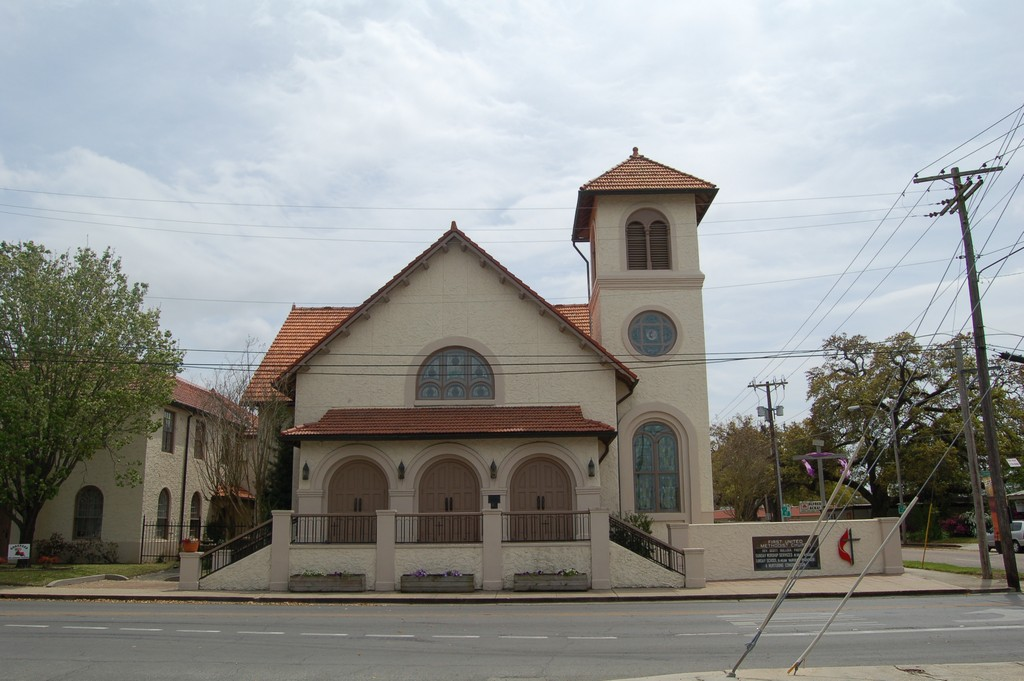

- Location within Louisiana Location within the United States
- Location: 119 Jefferson Street, New Iberia, Louisiana
- Coordinates: 30°00′29″N 91°49′17″W
- Area: 1.07 acres (0.43 ha)
- Built: 1907
- Architectural style: Late 19th And 20th Century Revivals, Italian Renaissance
- Part of: Downtown Commercial Historic District (ID100001710)
- NRHP reference No.: 89002002

Significant dates
- Added to NRHP: November 16, 1989
- Designated CP: December 13, 2017

First Methodist Church of New Iberia is a historic church located in New Iberia, Louisiana.

Built in 1891, the church suffered severe damage by fire in 1907 and was rebuilt by congregation to its present appearance. The Italian Renaissance style was created by decorating the original Gothic Revival building. Since 1907 the only structural alteration was the addition of an arcaded hallway in 1939, connecting the church to a newly constructed education building. A meticulous restoration of the church exterior took place between 1986 and 1987.

The church and the 1939 education building were added to the National Register of Historic Places on November 16, 1989.

First Methodist Church was formerly a member of The United Methodist Church. Currently a member of The Global Methodist Church.

== See also ==
- National Register of Historic Places listings in Iberia Parish, Louisiana
