= Shadows-on-the-Teche =

- U.S. National Register of Historic Places
- U.S. National Historic Landmark
- U.S. Historic district – Contributing property
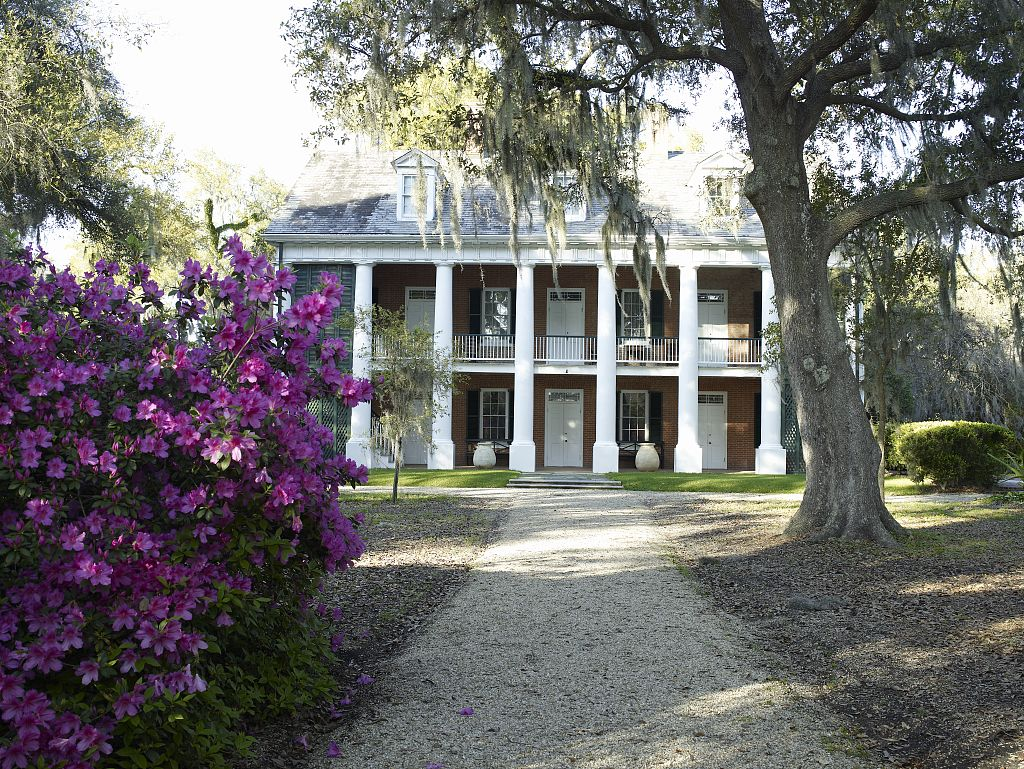
- Shadows-on-the-Teche in 2007

- Location within Louisiana Location within the United States
- Location: 317 East Main Street, New Iberia, Louisiana
- Coordinates: 30°00′16″N 91°48′56″W
- Area: 2.5 acres (1.0 ha)
- Built: 1834
- Architectural style: Greek Revival
- Part of: East Main Street Historic District (ID83000507)
- NRHP reference No.: 72000553

Significant dates
- Added to NRHP: October 5, 1972
- Designated NHL: May 30, 1974
- Designated CP: July 28, 1983

Shadows-on-the-Teche is an American 3,750 square feet (348 m^{2}) historic house, garden, and cemetery. Formerly a working sugar cane plantation with enslaved labor, it is located in New Iberia, Louisiana, United States. Built in 1834 for planter, David Weeks and his wife Mary Conrad Weeks, the property is also home to the Shadows-on-the-Teche cemetery.

This is a National Historic Landmark since 1974 and is currently owned and operated by the National Trust for Historic Preservation.

== House and grounds ==
=== Architecture ===
Sited 20 feet above the banks of the Bayou Teche, the construction of Shadows-on-the-Teche, a two-and-a-half-story, sixteen room house, coincided with the apogee of the Greek Revival style in United States architecture. When following this style, builders minimized the installation of superfluous decorative elements such as cornices, moldings, and trim. Decorations were severely limited and were designed to blend into and set off the building's handmade red brick construction. The seven bay entrance facade is located on the south front and is made up of eight full-height Tuscan columns of white-plastered brick standing on high square bases, that support a second-floor gallery or veranda, and topped by a Doric frieze. An exterior staircase is located on the left side of the front gallery that is hidden behind green painted louvered panels that are found on each side of the gallery. Three pedimented dormers are found on the gabled roof, that is pierced with two symmetrical brick chimneys on the ridge line that flank the central dormer.

The north facing rear facade features a central, two level open loggia that is enclosed on three sides by the house, flanked with double fenestrations on each level. The loggia is accessed on the ground floor by triple brick archways, where to the left, a narrow staircase leads to the second level with double white columns helping to support the frieze at the top of the house, and enclosed by a banister. Three pedimented dormers are found on the roof identical to the front.

=== Interior ===
The house has a traditional Creole plan on both floors, with three rooms across the front and two rear rooms flanking the loggia. On the first floor, the dining room, with a black and white checkered marble floor, occupies the center of the house. To the right of the dining room is an art studio, and to the left is a pantry/service work area that was used later as a kitchen. None of the ground floor rooms are accessed by interior hallways, and must be entered via the front gallery or the loggia in the rear. On the second floor an ornate parlor is centered in the middle and is flanked by the master bedroom on the left, with adjacent sitting room and secondary bedrooms on the right. The interior walls are covered with wallpaper, while the cypress doors were painted to simulate oak and the fireplaces were finished to appear like marble. Shadows-on-the-Teche was furnished throughout with Federal-style and Empire-style furniture brought in from the U.S. East Coast.

=== Grounds ===
The grounds were laid out by Shadows-on-the-Teche's last private owner, William Weeks Hall, who established gardens formed by boxwood hedges and aspidistra walks, that included live oaks, bamboo, camellias, azaleas, and other plantings. At the northeast corner of the house is located an underground brick cistern, 6 feet deep and 11 feet wide, with a 3-foot-high domed top and a capacity of over 4,000 gallons. To the north, between the house and the bayou, is a summer house built in 1928, as a focal point to the gardens, designed to mimic the arches on the rear facade of the house. Elsewhere on the grounds is the Weeks family cemetery that contains the remains of four generations of the family, with the last burial for William Weeks Hall who died in 1958.

== History ==
=== Early years, 1834 – 1922 ===
David and Mary Weeks were wealthy growers of sugar cane; they owned four plantations totaling approximately 3,000 acres (12 km^{2}) of Acadiana land. Shadows-on-the-Teche was built on a tract of 158 acres on the edge of one of Weeks' plantations in the parish seat of Iberia Parish. As a town house, Shadows-on-the-Teche was designed for social life and entertainment. It is said that, at the time of its construction, Shadows-on-the-Teche was only the third brick house to be built on Bayou Teche.

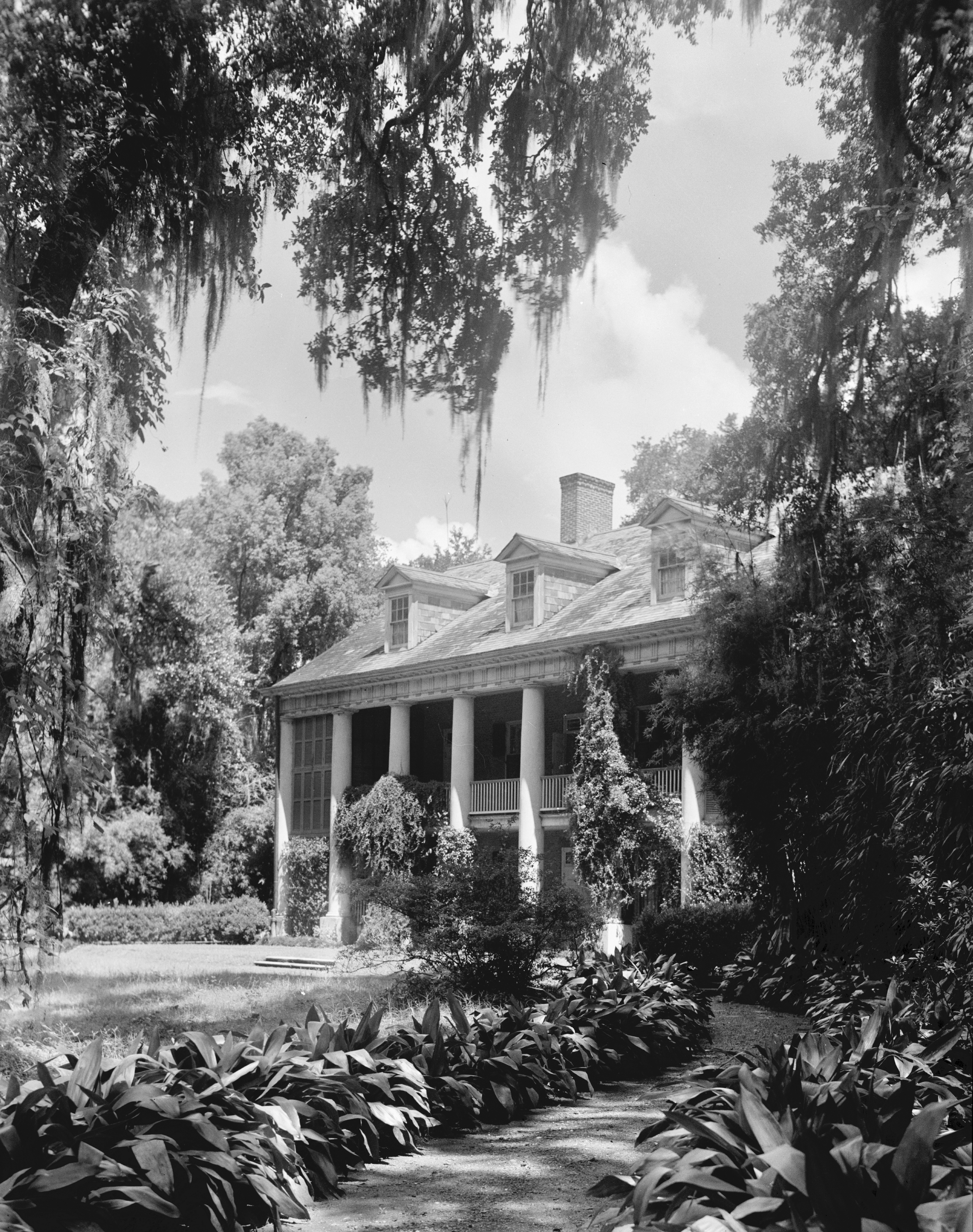
Shadows-on-the-Teche in 1938

The Weeks family began to suffer from a series of family tragedies almost at once after the completion of the house. Planter David Weeks, who became chronically ill while Shadows-on-the-Teche was being built, died in August 1834 while in traveling in New England seeking medical attention.

Mary Weeks remarried lawyer John Moore but kept her children's property separate from that of her second husband, as she was allowed to do under Louisiana law. This property included the 164 slaves, bequeathed to their children under the terms of her first husband's will.

David and Mary Weeks daughter, Frances Mary Weeks (Magill) Pruett and her children Mary Ida Magill and Augustine Magill were vacationing at Last Island, Louisiana; where they died in the 1856 Last Island hurricane disaster. The children were buried on the grounds of Shadows-on-the-Teche.

The Shadows-on-the-Teche household was economically and physically dependent on Louisiana slavery. Mary Weeks and John Moore strongly supported African American slavery and supported the political changes which they thought were necessary to save it; in 1861, Moore was a delegate to the convention in which Louisiana seceded from the Union. This political status and viewpoint made the household vulnerable during the Civil War. Federal troops requisitioned occupancy of the property, and officers of the occupying army quartered themselves in it. Mary Weeks died in December 1863 at Shadows-on-the-Teche, while part of the house was being used by Union troops as officers' quarters.

The house was inherited by David and Mary Weeks' eldest son, William F. Weeks (1824–1895), who partly restored the family fortunes during Reconstruction era. However, after his death in 1895, the property was passed to his daughters Lily and Harriet, who were compelled to sell off much of the land surrounding the house to meet their living expenses, reducing the grounds from 158 acres to 2 1/2 acres.

=== 1922 – present day ===
Lily's only child, William Weeks Hall (sometimes called Weeks Hall), moved into the Shadows-on-the-Teche in 1922, after he bought out his aunt's partial ownership in the property, and lived there until his death in 1958. An accomplished artist and strongly preservation-minded individual, Hall sorted and donated the voluminous archive of family papers that he found in the house, and entertained many notable people of the age including Lyle Saxon, Cecil B. DeMille, Emily Post, Walt Disney, and Henry Miller, who recounted his visit to the property in his travelogue The Air-Conditioned Nightmare.

At the end of his life in 1958, Hall donated the house and garden to the National Trust for Historic Preservation, which has owned and operated it to the present. Shadows-on-the-Teche was named a National Historic Landmark on May 30, 1974, and is visited by over 25,000 people annually. In 2022, the Iberia African American Historical Society opened a center for research and learning within Shadows-on-the-Teche.

== See also ==
- 1856 Last Island hurricane, where three family members perished
- Iberia African American Historical Society, located on site
- List of plantations in Louisiana
- National Register of Historic Places listings in Iberia Parish, Louisiana
- List of National Historic Landmarks in Louisiana
