= Enterprise Plantation =

Historic house in Louisiana, United States

- U.S. National Register of Historic Places
- Location within Louisiana Location within the United States
- Location: About 3.5 miles (5.6 km) west of Jeanerette, off US 90
- Nearest city: Jeanerette, Louisiana
- Coordinates: 29°54′28″N 91°43′19″W
- Area: 1,650 acres (670 ha)
- Built: 1835
- NRHP reference No.: 75000848
- Added to NRHP: March 17, 1975

Enterprise Plantation is located about 3.5 miles (5.6 km) west of Jeanerette, Louisiana, off US 90. It was built in 1835 and its 1,650 acres (670 ha) area, comprising the plantation house and several other historic buildings, was added to the National Register of Historic Places on March 17, 1975.

Simeon Patout, an immigrant from a family of vintners from Usay, France, built the house with plans to grow grapes. The conditions were unfavorable for that, so he began sugar production instead. Although he died from yellow fever in 1847, his family has continued to own and operate the sugar farm. The sugar facility is now known as M.A. Patout & Son, Ltd. Member of the family occupy Enterprise Plantation.

== See also ==
- List of plantations in Louisiana
- National Register of Historic Places listings in Iberia Parish, Louisiana
