= Downtown New Iberia Commercial Historic District =

Historic district in Louisiana, United States

- U.S. National Register of Historic Places
- U.S. Historic district
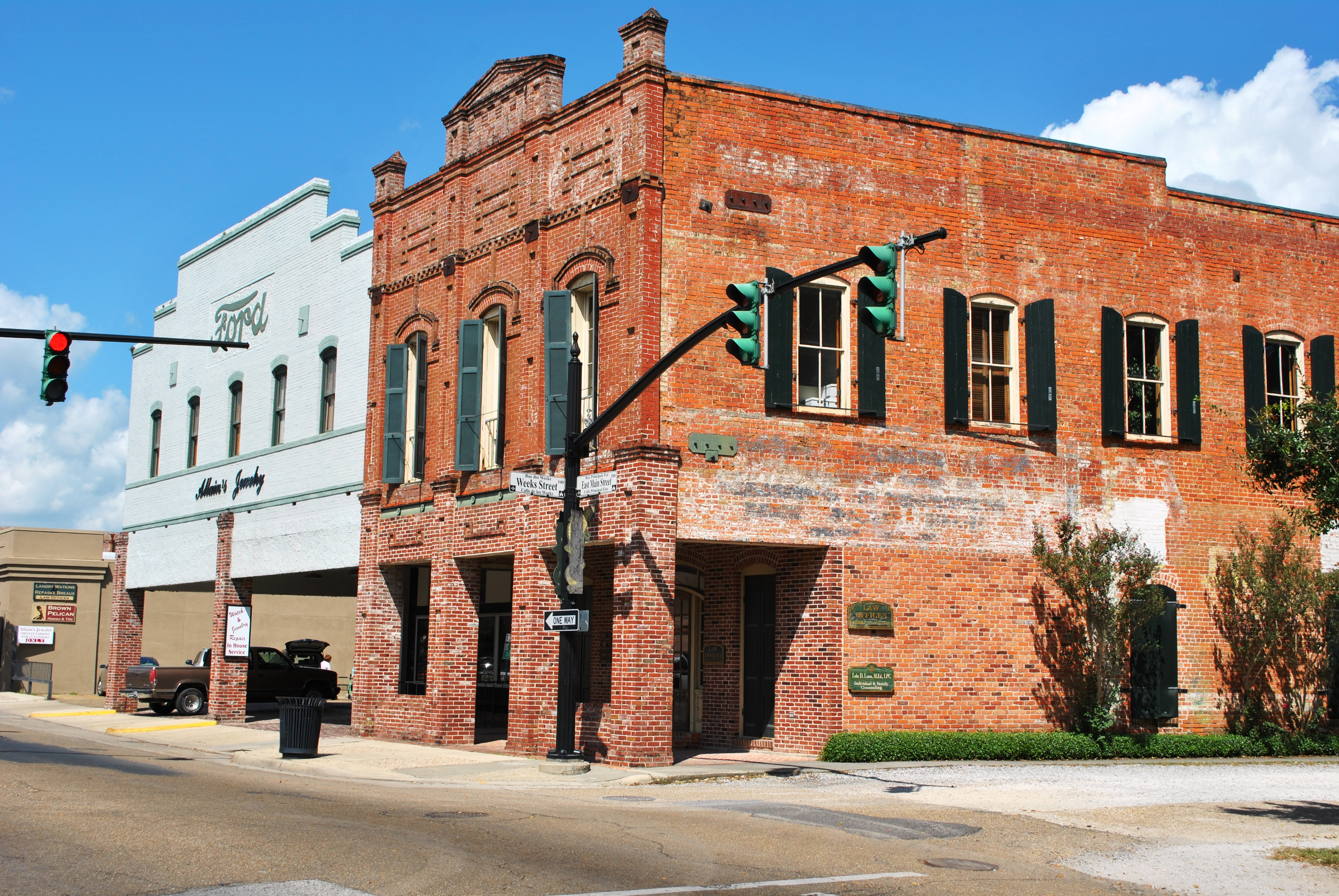
- Pascal Building and Leblanc & Broussard Ford Dealership on East Main Street

- Location within Louisiana Location within the United States
- Location: Roughly bounded by Fulton Street, Burke Street, Weeks Street, St. Peter Street and Jefferson Street, New Iberia, Louisiana
- Coordinates: 30°00′23″N 91°49′10″W
- Area: 68.87 acres (27.87 ha)
- NRHP reference No.: 100001710
- Added to NRHP: December 13, 2017

Downtown New Iberia Commercial Historic District is a historic district in downtown New Iberia, Louisiana, United States, located along Main Street and St. Peter Street, from Jefferson Street to Weeks Street.

The 68.87 acres (27.87 ha) area comprises a total of 121 buildings, of which 73 are considered contributing properties, and 9 are also listed on the National Register of Historic Places as individual properties or as part of East Main Street Historic District. Building dates vary from 1870 to 1967 and represent relevant structures related to commerce and entertainment/recreation.

Despite being located inside the district area, the individually listed The Magnolias is not part of Downtown New Iberia Commercial Historic District, as the building is not commerce related. The house is therefore considered a non-contributing property.

The historic district was listed on the National Register of Historic Places on December 13, 2017.

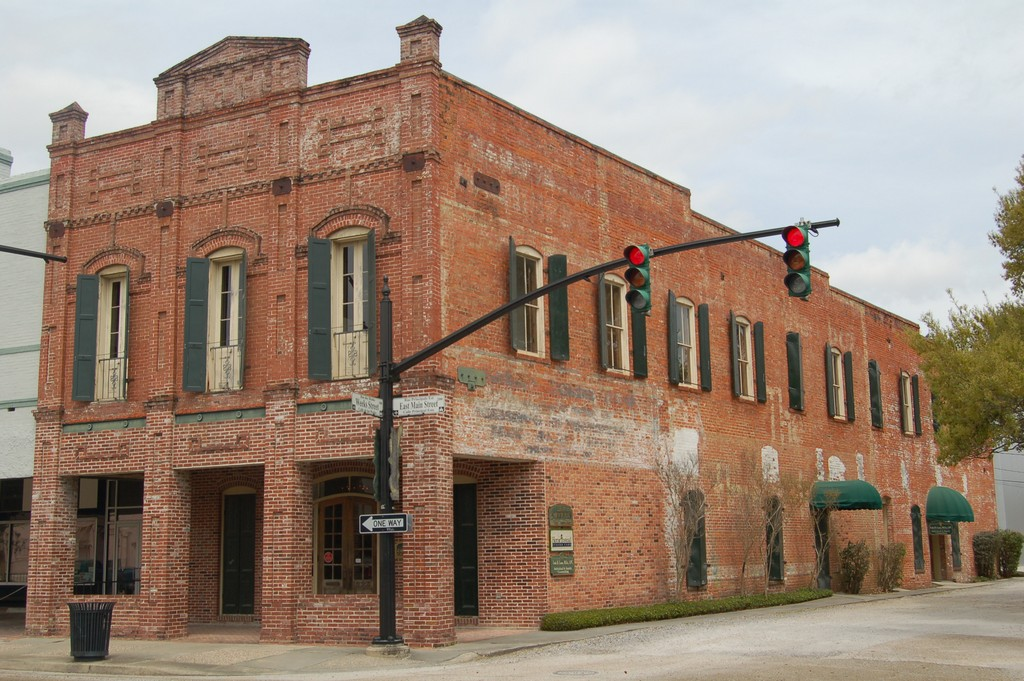
Pascal Building at 223 East Main Street

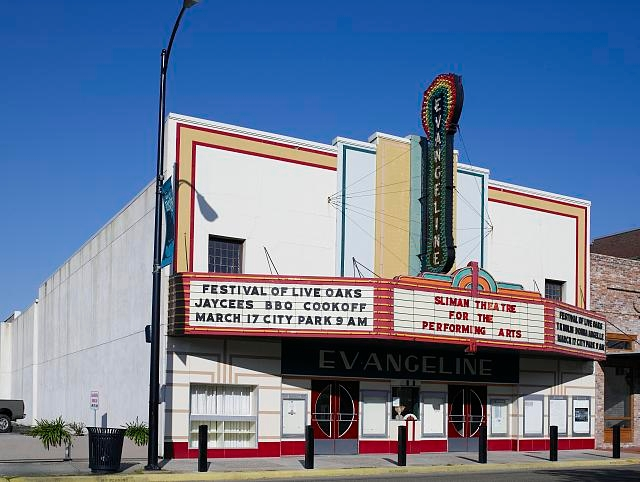
Evangeline Theater at 129 East Main Street

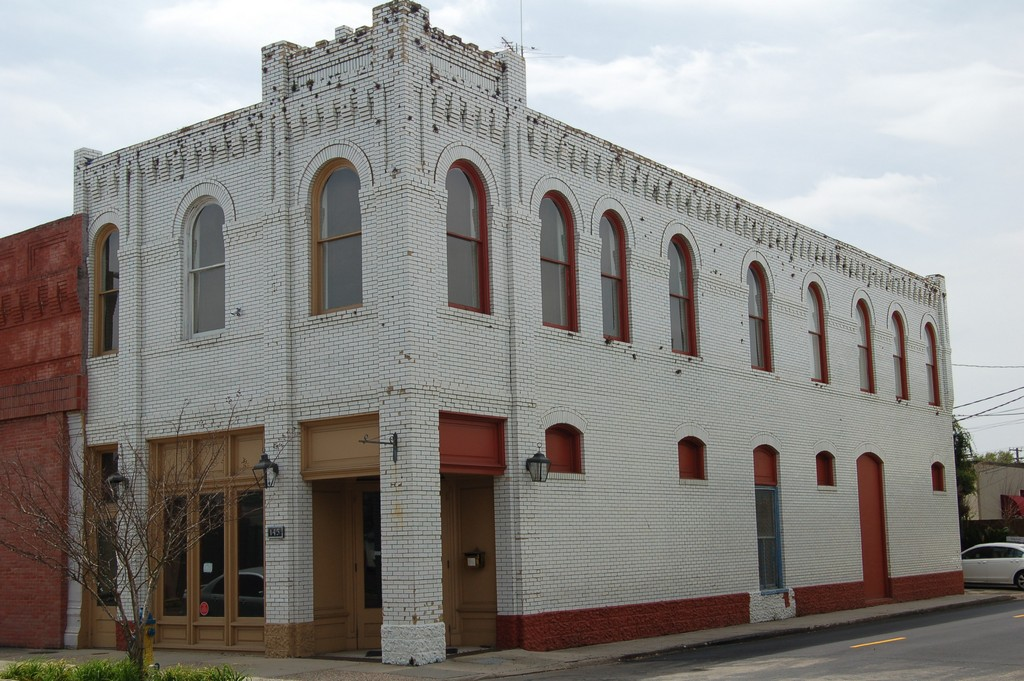
John R. Taylor Drugstore at 145 West Main Street

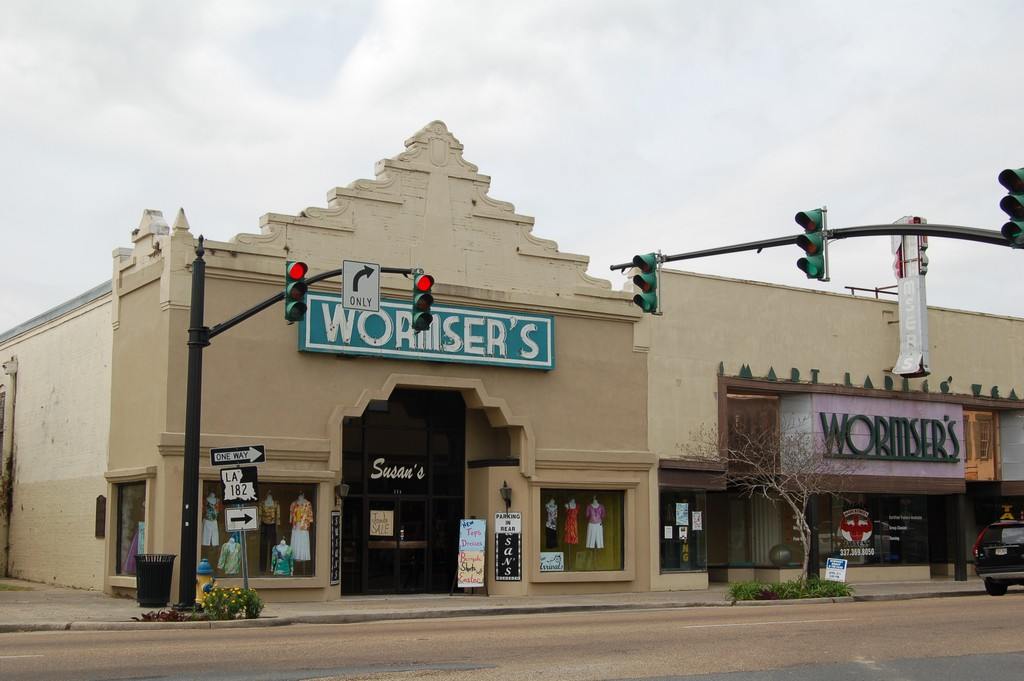
Wormser's Department Store at 112-116 East Main Street

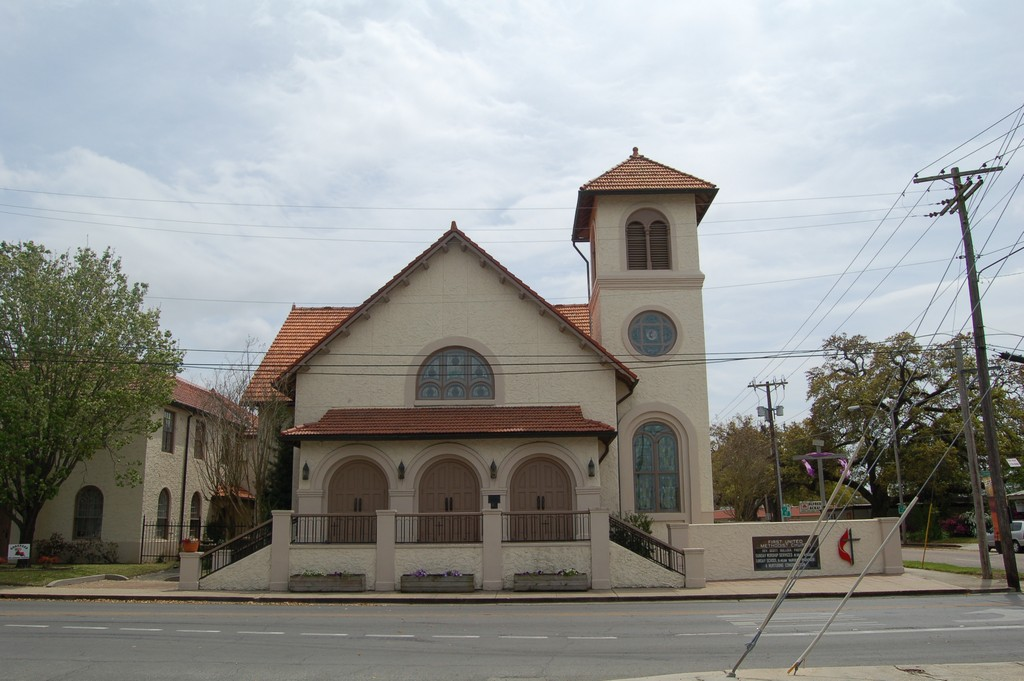
First United Methodist Church at 119 Jefferson Street

== Contributing properties ==
The historical district contains a total of 73 contributing properties, built between 1870 and 1967:

- NEW IBERIA (steamboat) shipwreck, Address restricted. Also individually listed.

=== Main Street ===
- Old Post Office, 300 East Main Street, 30°00′15″N 91°49′00″W, built c.1903. Also listed in East Main Street Historic District.
- Pascal Building, 223 East Main Street, 30°00′17″N 91°48′59″W, built 1889. Also individually listed.
- Leblanc & Broussard Ford Dealership, 221 East Main Street, 30°00′17″N 91°49′00″W, built c.1912.
- Leblanc & Broussard Service Department Warehouse, 221½ East Main Street, 30°00′18″N 91°48′59″W, built 1931.
- Davis Building, 133 East Main Street, 30°00′18″N 91°49′02″W, built 1892.
- Bayou Teche Museum, 131 East Main Street, 30°00′19″N 91°49′02″W, built 1929-30.
- Evangeline Theater, 129 East Main Street, 30°00′19″N 91°49′02″W, built 1929-30. Also individually listed.
- Crystal Image, 115 East Main Street, 30°00′19″N 91°49′02″W.
- Crystal Image, 115 East Main Street, 30°00′20″N 91°49′04″W.
- Provost's Café, 113 East Main Street, 30°00′20″N 91°49′04″W. Also known as Armand's and Clementine's Fine Dining.
- Building at 111 East Main Street, 30°00′21″N 91°49′04″W.
- Building at 109 East Main Street, 30°00′21″N 91°49′05″W.
- Coleman Building, 105 East Main Street, 30°00′21″N 91°49′05″W.
- DeRouen Financial, 103 East Main Street, 30°00′22″N 91°49′05″W.
- Renoudet Building, 101 East Main Street, 30°00′22″N 91°49′05″W.
- Building at 144 West Main Street, 30°00′25″N 91°49′09″W. Built 1941.
- Building at 144A West Main Street, 30°00′26″N 91°49′08″W. Built 1941.
- McMahon Furniture Company, 150 West Main Street, 30°00′26″N 91°49′09″W. Built 1890.
- Satterfield Building, 152 West Main Street, 30°00′26″N 91°49′10″W. Built 1881.
- Chevron (Gulf) Service Station, 200 West Main Street, 30°00′27″N 91°49′10″W. Built 1927.
- Riviere's Jewelry Store, 214 West Main Street, 30°00′28″N 91°49′11″W. Built 1940s.
- Slim's News Stand, 216 West Main Street, 30°00′28″N 91°49′11″W. Built 1940s.
- Iberia Steam Laundry, 220 West Main Street, 30°00′28″N 91°49′11″W.
- Steinberg Building, 232 West Main Street, 30°00′29″N 91°49′12″W. Built c.1880.
- American Department Store, 254 West Main Street, 30°00′31″N 91°49′14″W. Built 1950s.
- Hebert's Hotel, 213-225 West Main Street, 30°00′28″N 91°49′13″W.
- John R. Taylor Drugstore, 145 West Main Street, 30°00′25″N 91°49′11″W. Built 1907. Also individually listed.
- Bayou Art Gallery, 143 West Main Street, 30°00′25″N 91°49′10″W. Built 1870s.
- Armentor's Jewelry Store, 137 West Main Street, 30°00′24″N 91°49′10″W.
- Abdalla's Department Store, 131 West Main Street, 30°00′23″N 91°49′10″W. Built 1950s-1960s.
- Napoleon's on the Teche, 127 West Main Street, 30°00′23″N 91°49′10″W. Built 1950s-1960s.
- Abdalla's Department Store Building #3, 131A West Main Street, 30°00′23″N 91°49′09″W. Built 1950s-1960s.
- People's National Bank, 119 West Main Street, 30°00′23″N 91°49′08″W. Built 1911. Also individually listed.
- Building at 109 West Main Street, 30°00′22″N 91°49′08″W.
- Model Company, 107 West Main Street, 30°00′22″N 91°49′08″W.
- Building at 105 West Main Street, 30°00′21″N 91°49′07″W.
- Gougenheim Building, 101 West Main Street, 30°00′21″N 91°49′07″W. Built c.1893. Also known as Hugonin Building and Morgan & Lindsay.
- Bowab's, 102 East Main Street, 30°00′21″N 91°49′06″W. Built c.1893.
- Creims, 104 East Main Street, 30°00′20″N 91°49′06″W. Built c.1893.
- Babineaux's Shoes, 108 East Main Street, 30°00′20″N 91°49′06″W.
- Ackal's Department Store, 110 East Main Street, 30°00′20″N 91°49′06″W.
- Wormser's Department Store, 112-116 East Main Street, 30°00′19″N 91°49′05″W. Built 1932. Also individually listed.
- Building at 120 East Main Street, 30°00′19″N 91°49′05″W. Built 1950s.
- Building at 122 East Main Street, 30°00′18″N 91°49′05″W. Built 1950s.
- Bazus Building, 210 East Main Street, 30°00′16″N 91°49′02″W.

=== Weeks Street and Julia Street ===
- Temple Gates of Prayer, 109 South Weeks Street, 30°00′14″N 91°49′01″W, built c.1903. Also listed in East Main Street Historic District.
- Leblanc & Broussard Service Department & Radiator Shop, 109 North Weeks Street, 30°00′18″N 91°48′59″W, built c.1931.
- Paul's Flower Shop, 110 South Weeks Street, 30°00′15″N 91°49′02″W, built 1958.
- Dauterive Undertaking Parlor, 121 Julia Street, 30°00′15″N 91°49′05″W, built 1899.
- Building at 122 Julia Street, 30°00′16″N 91°49′06″W.
- Building at 132 Julia Street, 30°00′16″N 91°49′06″W.
- Building at 136 Julia Street, 30°00′16″N 91°49′06″W.
- Building at 138 Julia Street, 30°00′15″N 91°49′06″W.

=== St. Peter Street and Jefferson Street ===
- Bayou Bindery, 125 East St. Peter Street, 30°00′17″N 91°49′07″W, built c.1940.
- Building at 123 East St. Peter Street, 30°00′17″N 91°49′08″W.
- Building at 115 East St. Peter Street, 30°00′18″N 91°49′08″W.
- Building at 111 East St. Peter Street, 30°00′18″N 91°49′08″W.
- Building at 103 East St. Peter Street, 30°00′18″N 91°49′09″W.
- Sucrose Frame Shoppe, 101 East St. Peter Street, 30°00′19″N 91°49′09″W. Built 1890s.
- Himel Motor Supply, 102 West St. Peter Street, 30°00′20″N 91°49′10″W. Also known as Parole Office.
- Building at 142 West St. Peter Street, 30°00′23″N 91°49′13″W.
- Building at 218 West St. Peter Street, 30°00′26″N 91°49′15″W.
- First United Methodist Church Office, 232 West St. Peter Street, 30°00′27″N 91°49′17″W.
- Salon LeRouge, 245 West St. Peter Street, 30°00′27″N 91°49′19″W.
- St. Peter Street Barber Shop, 247 West St. Peter Street, 30°00′28″N 91°49′19″W.
- Vaccaro-Jennaro Store, 301 West St. Peter Street, 30°00′28″N 91°49′21″W. Built c.1898.
- First United Methodist Church, 119 Jefferson Street, 30°00′29″N 91°49′17″W. Built 1891. Also individually listed.

=== Iberia Street, Burke Street and Bridge Street ===
- Essanee Theater, 126 Iberia Street, 30°00′20″N 91°49′09″W. Built 1937.
- Building at 120 Iberia Street, 30°00′21″N 91°49′08″W.
- Building at 109 Iberia Street, 30°00′20″N 91°49′07″W.
- Building at 111-113 Iberia Street, 30°00′19″N 91°49′08″W.
- Iberia Industrial Development Foundation, 101 Burke Street, 30°00′20″N 91°49′09″W. Built late 1950s.
- Building at 109 Burke Street, 30°00′22″N 91°49′03″W. Built c.1940.
- Building at 3 Bridge Street, 30°00′22″N 91°49′03″W.

=== Church Alley ===
- Building at 114 Church Alley, 30°00′18″N 91°49′07″W. Built c.1960.
- Building at 116 Church Alley, 30°00′18″N 91°49′06″W. Built c.1960.
- Building at 113 Church Alley, 30°00′18″N 91°49′06″W. Built c.1960.
- Building at 121 Church Alley, 30°00′17″N 91°49′07″W. Built between 1931 and 1948.
- Building at 125 Church Alley, 30°00′17″N 91°49′07″W. Built c.1940.
- Commercial Space, 108-112 Church Alley, 30°00′18″N 91°49′07″W. Built c.1960.

== See also ==
- National Register of Historic Places listings in Iberia Parish, Louisiana
- East Main Street Historic District
- Pascal Building
- Evangeline Theater
- John R. Taylor Drugstore
- People's National Bank
- Wormser's Department Store
- First United Methodist Church
- NEW IBERIA (steamboat) shipwreck
