= Steamboat House (New Iberia, Louisiana) =

- U.S. National Register of Historic Places
- U.S. Historic district – Contributing property
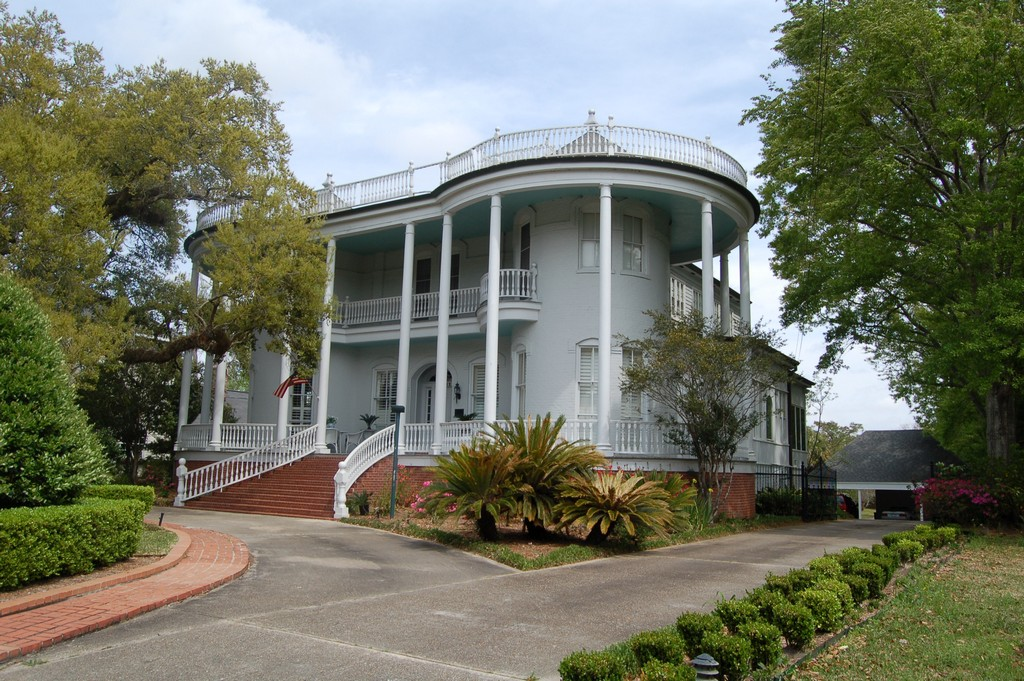
- The Steamboat House in 2010

- Location within Louisiana
- Location: 623 East Main Street, New Iberia, Louisiana
- Coordinates: 30°00′04″N 91°48′36″W
- Area: 2.7 acres (1.1 ha)
- Built: 1896
- Architectural style: Late Victorian, Raised House
- Part of: East Main Street Historic District (ID83000507)
- NRHP reference No.: 79001066

Significant dates
- Added to NRHP: July 27, 1979
- Designated CP: July 28, 1983

The Steamboat House, also known as the Emmer-Hughes House, is a historic house in New Iberia, Louisiana, U.S.. It was built in 1896, and it belonged to a New Iberia Mayor as well as Lieutenant Governor Paul N. Cyr. It is listed on the National Register of Historic Places.

== History ==
The house was built in 1896 for John Emmer, a farmer, real estate investor, and the owner of a brickyard. He also served as the mayor of New Iberia from 1889 to 1891. The house was inherited by his daughter and his son-in-law, George Lebau, the president of the New Iberia National Bank, in 1903. The Lebaus lived here until 1937.

The house was acquired by Paul N. Cyr, a politician who served as the Lieutenant Governor of Louisiana from 1928 to 1931, in 1937.

== Architectural significance ==
The house was designed in the Victorian architectural style. It has been listed on the National Register of Historic Places since July 27, 1979.
