= East Main Street Historic District (New Iberia, Louisiana) =

Historic district in Louisiana, United States

- U.S. National Register of Historic Places
- U.S. Historic district
- Location within Louisiana Location within the United States
- Location: East Main Street, Lee Street, Ann Street and Philip Street, New Iberia, Louisiana
- Coordinates: 30°00′06″N 91°48′40″W
- Area: 30 acres (12 ha)
- NRHP reference No.: 83000507
- Added to NRHP: July 28, 1983

East Main Street Historic District is a historic district in downtown New Iberia, Louisiana, United States, located along East Main Street from Weeks Street to Philip Street.

The 30-acre (12 ha) area comprises a total of 71 buildings, of which 57 are considered contributing properties, and 4 are also listed on the National Register of Historic Places as individual properties or contributing properties of Downtown New Iberia Commercial Historic District, one of them (Shadows-on-the-Teche) is also a National Historic Landmark. Building dates vary from 1834 to 1933 and represent the most relevant structures of New Iberia's main residential rue in historic period.

The historic district was listed on the National Register of Historic Places on July 28, 1983.

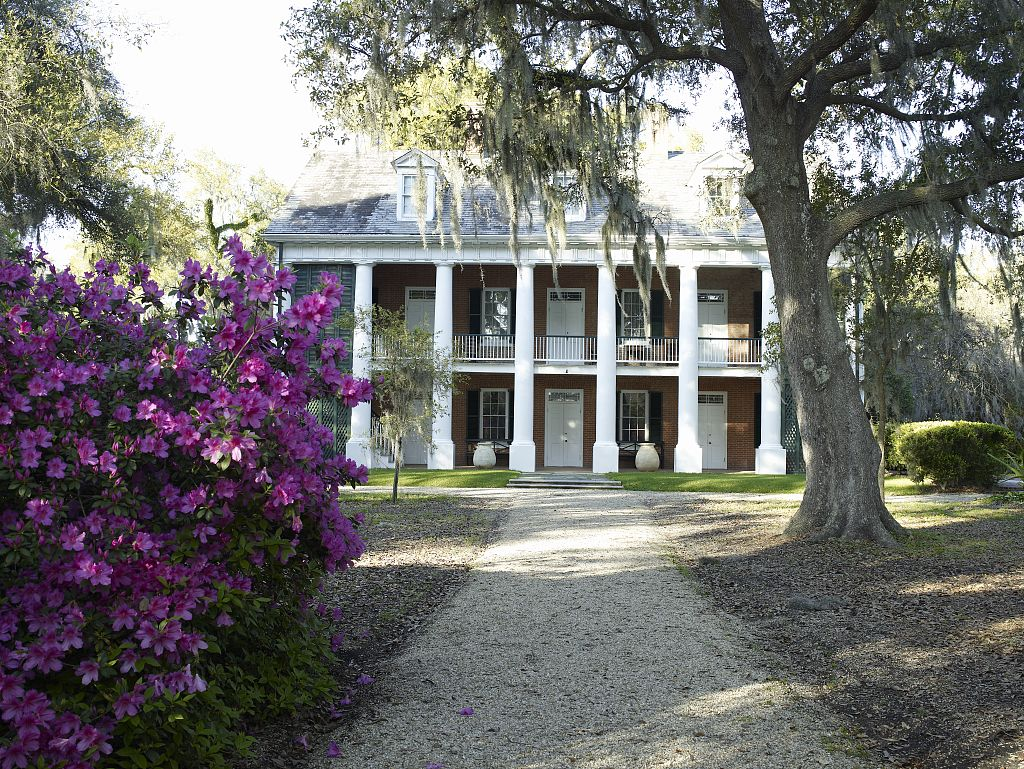
Shadows-on-the-Teche historic house at 317 East Main Street

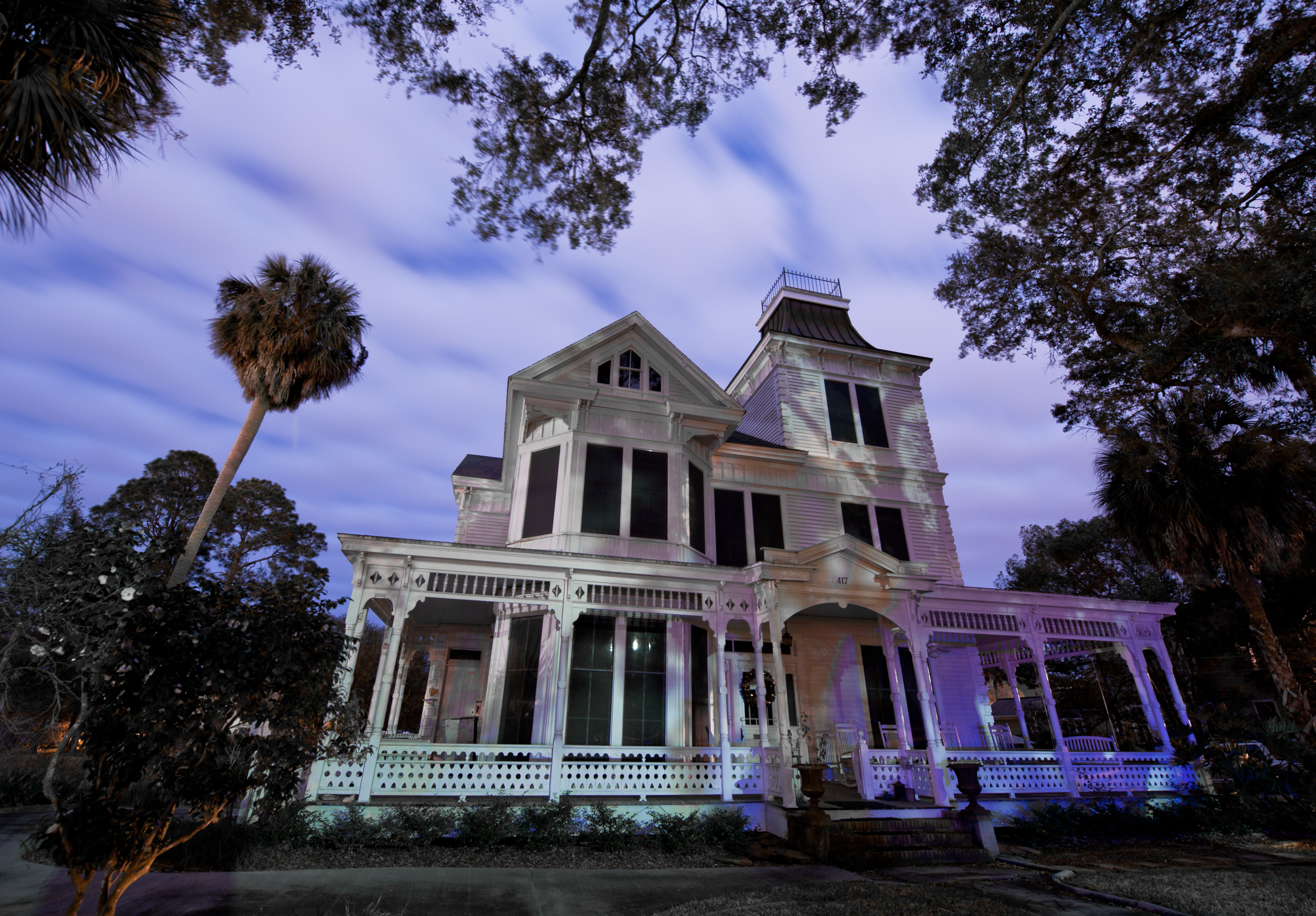
House at 417 East Main Street

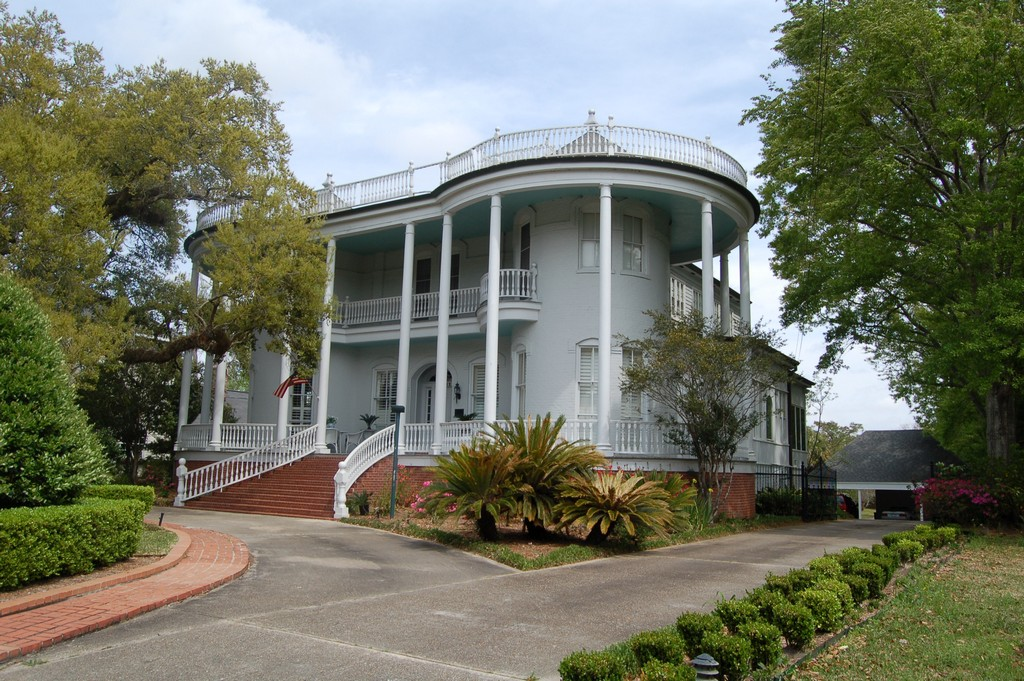
Steamboat House at 623 East Main Street

== Contributing properties ==
The historical district contains a total of 57 contributing properties, built between 1834 and 1933:

- Temple Gates of Prayer (Synagogue), 109 South Weeks Street, 30°00′14″N 91°49′01″W, built c.1903. Also listed in Downtown New Iberia Commercial Historic District.
- Old Post Office, 300 East Main Street, 30°00′15″N 91°49′00″W, built c.1903. Also listed in Downtown New Iberia Commercial Historic District.
- Shadows-on-the-Teche, 317 East Main Street, 30°00′16″N 91°48′56″W, built 1834. Also individually listed as a National Historic Landmark.
- House at 314 East Main Street, 30°00′14″N 91°48′58″W, built c.1900.
- First Federal Savings & Loan, 320 East Main Street, 30°00′13″N 91°48′57″W, built 1902.
- House at 333 East Main Street, 30°00′15″N 91°48′54″W, built c.1900.
- House at 405 East Main Street, 30°00′14″N 91°48′54″W, built 1890s.
- House at 412 East Main Street, 30°00′11″N 91°48′55″W, built c.1880.
- House at 417 East Main Street, 30°00′13″N 91°48′52″W, built 1890s.
- House at 424 East Main Street, 30°00′10″N 91°48′53″W, built 1920s.
- House at 425 East Main Street, 30°00′12″N 91°48′51″W, built 1890s.
- House at 438 East Main Street, 30°00′10″N 91°48′52″W, built 1920s.
- House at 442 East Main Street, 30°00′10″N 91°48′51″W, built 1890s.
- House at 446 East Main Street, 30°00′09″N 91°48′51″W, built 1920s.
- House at 504 East Main Street, 30°00′07″N 91°48′47″W, built c.1910.
- House at 511 East Main Street, 30°00′09″N 91°48′45″W, built c.1930.
- House at 512 East Main Street, 30°00′07″N 91°48′46″W, built c.1920.
- House at 520 East Main Street, 30°00′07″N 91°48′45″W, built c.1930.
- House at 534 East Main Street, 30°00′06″N 91°48′43″W, built c.1880.
- House at 541 East Main Street, 30°00′08″N 91°48′41″W, built c.1930.
- House at 544 East Main Street, 30°00′05″N 91°48′42″W, built c.1880.
- House at 604 East Main Street, 30°00′04″N 91°48′41″W, built c.1890.
- House at 608 East Main Street, 30°00′04″N 91°48′40″W, built c.1890.
- House at 616 East Main Street, 30°00′04″N 91°48′39″W, built c.1900.
- Steamboat House, 623 East Main Street, 30°00′05″N 91°48′37″W, built 1882. Also known as Cyr House and individually listed.
- House at 624 East Main Street, 30°00′04″N 91°48′38″W, built c.1890.
- House at 625 East Main Street, 30°00′05″N 91°48′36″W, built 1920s.
- House at 630 East Main Street, 30°00′03″N 91°48′37″W, built c.1925.
- House at 640 East Main Street, 30°00′02″N 91°48′37″W, built c.1900.
- House at 647 East Main Street, 30°00′04″N 91°48′34″W, built 1920s.
- House at 651 East Main Street, 30°00′03″N 91°48′34″W, built c.1890.
- House at 656 East Main Street, 30°00′01″N 91°48′35″W, built c.1890.
- House at 664 East Main Street, 30°00′00″N 91°48′34″W, built c.1850.
- House at 667 East Main Street, 30°00′02″N 91°48′32″W, built 1920s.
- House at 701 East Main Street, 30°00′02″N 91°48′30″W, built 1920s.
- House at 705 East Main Street, 30°00′02″N 91°48′30″W, built 1920s.
- House at 707 East Main Street, 30°00′01″N 91°48′29″W, built 1920s.
- House at 712 East Main Street, 29°59′59″N 91°48′30″W, built c.1900.
- House at 715 East Main Street, 30°00′01″N 91°48′28″W, built 1920s.
- House at 718 East Main Street, 29°59′59″N 91°48′30″W, built c.1900.
- House at 724 East Main Street, 29°59′58″N 91°48′28″W, built c.1880.
- House at 727 East Main Street, 30°00′00″N 91°48′27″W, built c.1930.
- House at 729 East Main Street, 30°00′00″N 91°48′26″W, built c.1890.
- House at 775 East Main Street, 29°59′59″N 91°48′25″W, built c.1890.
- House at 812 East Main Street, 29°59′57″N 91°48′26″W, built c.1910.
- House at 815 East Main Street, 29°59′59″N 91°48′24″W, built 1920s.
- House at 826 East Main Street, 29°59′59″N 91°48′24″W, built 1920s.
- House at 829 East Main Street, 29°59′57″N 91°48′23″W, built c.1890.
- House at 830 East Main Street, 29°59′56″N 91°48′24″W, built c.1890.
- House at 200 Philip Street, 29°59′59″N 91°48′22″W, built c.1900.
- House at 202 Philip Street, 29°59′59″N 91°48′21″W, built 1902.
- House at 206 Philip Street, 30°00′00″N 91°48′20″W, built 1920s.
- House at 119 Lee Street, 29°59′57″N 91°48′28″W, built c.1890.
- House at 120 Lee Street, 29°59′58″N 91°48′29″W, built c.1920.
- House at 122 Lee Street, 29°59′57″N 91°48′30″W, built c.1920.
- House at 127 Ann Street, 29°59′58″N 91°48′34″W, built c.1890.
- House at 129 Ann Street, 29°59′58″N 91°48′34″W, built c.1890.

== See also ==
- National Register of Historic Places listings in Iberia Parish, Louisiana
- Downtown New Iberia Commercial Historic District
- Shadows-on-the-Teche
- Steamboat House
