= St. Joseph School (Jeanerette, Louisiana) =

Location
- Jeanerette, Louisiana; United States; 29°54′N 91°40′W

Information
- Type: Catholic school
- Established: 1 October 1888
- Closed: 2011
- School district: Iberia Parish School System

St. Joseph School was a Catholic school in Jeanerette, Louisiana between 1 October 1888 and the end of the 2011 academic year.

The Catholic Sisters of Mercy arrived in Jeanerette at the invitation of local pastor Father Michael Bardy on 29 September 1888, ten years after the founding of the town. Two days later, the school was opened in two buildings on Provost Street, with one building for the teaching of boys and another for the teaching of girls.

In 1959, the school was moved to a rural area just outside Jeanerette, on the other side of the Bayou Teche river. The Carlyle Bourgeois family donated a 16-acre (65,000 m^{2}) plot for the new school and the St. Paul Bourgeois family donated an area for athletics. On, September 4–5, 1969, the high school and administrative wing of the school was destroyed by fire, but was rebuilt for the start of the next school year.

After more than a two-year financial struggle and low enrollment, St. Joseph School closed at the end of the 2011 school year.
