= Rice Mill Lofts =

Residential building in New Orleans, Louisiana

Coordinates: 29.9624°N 90.0477°W

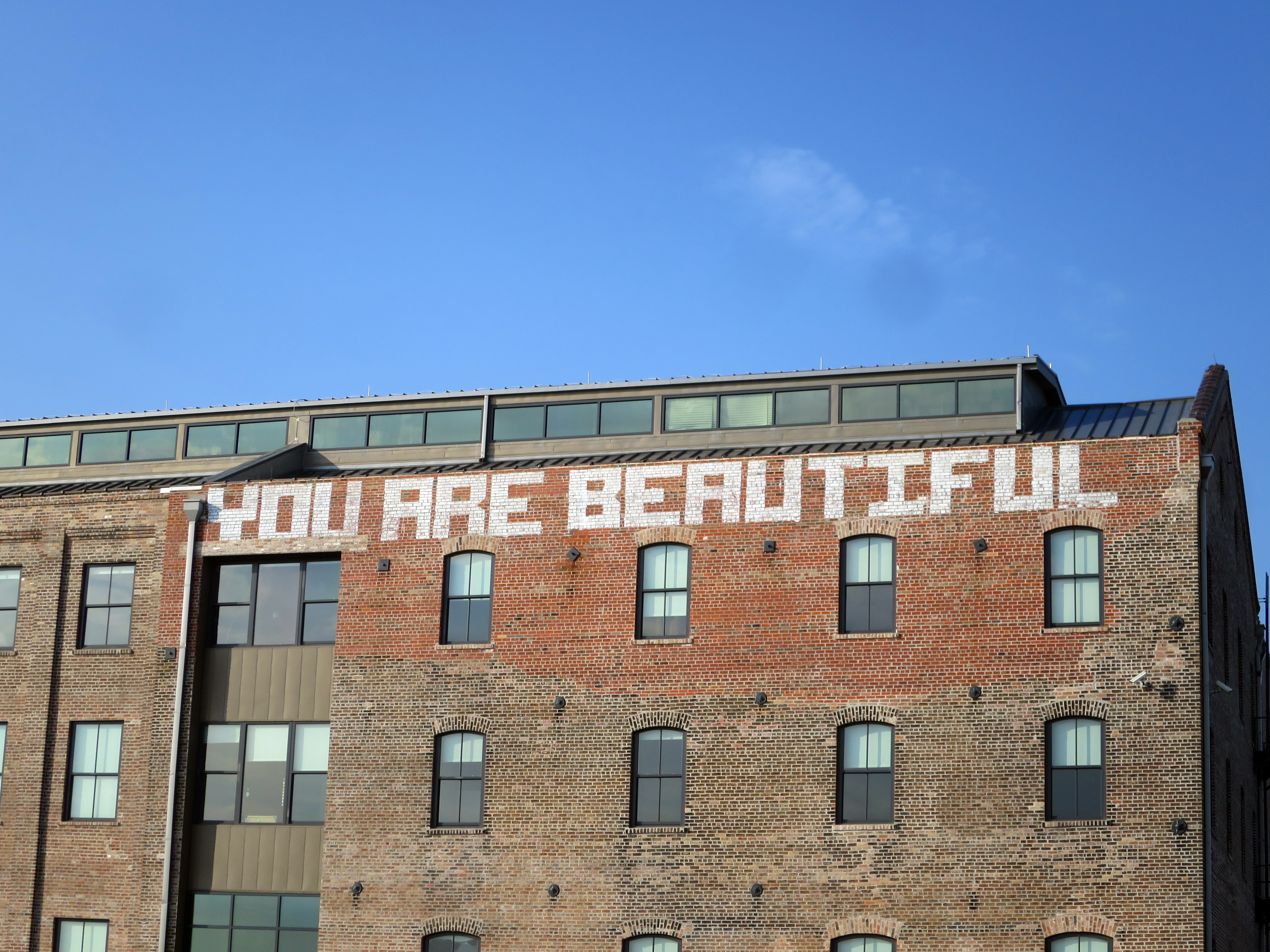
Exterior view of Rice Mill Lofts, March 2015

Rice Mill Lofts is a five-story residential building in New Orleans, located in the bohemian Bywater neighborhood, near the Mississippi River. It houses 69 lofts, townhouses and studios, and is located next to the New Orleans Center for Creative Arts (NOCCA). Mariza, a restaurant, opened in 2013.

== History / Architecture / Graffiti ==
The Rice Mill Lofts building is a 108,000-square-foot structure originally built in 1892, and was once home to the largest rice mill in North America.

Entrepreneur Sean Cummings purchased the building in 1993, but did not begin renovations until March 2010. In the meantime, the building was heavily vandalized. When the $20 million renovation began, Cummings decided to keep much of the original graffiti, including a large mural on the exterior building with the words "You are Beautiful," which is rumored to have been created by British street artist Banksy.

The remodeled building was designed and developed by Sean Cummings and Anthony "T.J." Iarocci, in association with New Orleans architect Wayne Troyer and Los Angeles interior designer L.M. Pagano, who has designed homes and yacht interiors for Nicolas Cage and Johnny Depp.

Famous residents of the building include Cady McClain and Jon Lindstrom, actors who once portrayed a divorced couple in the American television soap opera, As the World Turns.

The grounds include a 55' pool around which local bar owner Alan Walter grows Sorrento lemons and every Saint Joseph's Day makes a local version of the Sicilian and Sorrentine Limoncello called Limoncino. The building houses Mariza and the largest street art "free wall" in the south.

== Art ==
In addition to the graffiti, the building also includes functional works created by local New Orleans artists. Erica Larkin designed doorpulls inspired by the Diddley Bow; David Borgerding created Conversation, a monumental mailbox sculpture; and Mitchell Gaudet created loft IDs from clear glass cast in a hand-carved mold.

== See also ==
- Bienville House: another converted rice mill in New Orleans
- Conrad Rice Mill: active rice mill in New Iberia, Louisiana
