= Episcopal Church of the Epiphany =

Historic church in Louisiana, United States

- U.S. National Register of Historic Places
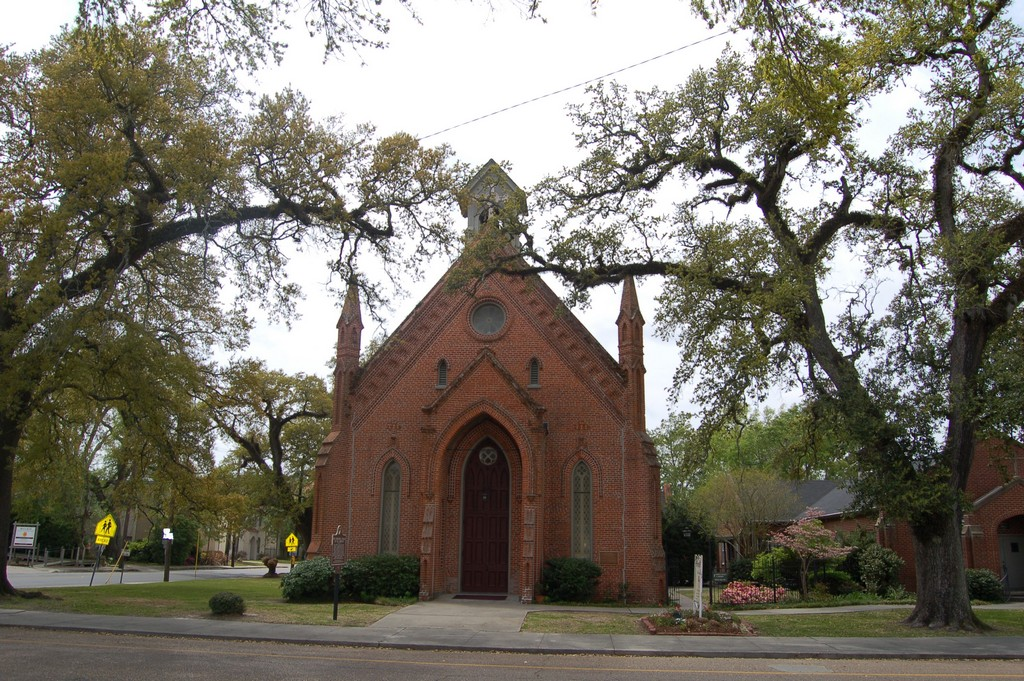

- Location within Louisiana Location within the United States
- Location: 303 West Main Street, New Iberia, Louisiana
- Coordinates: 30°00′31″N 91°49′17″W
- Area: less than one acre
- Built: 1858
- Architectural style: Gothic Revival, English Medieval
- NRHP reference No.: 77000670
- Added to NRHP: April 29, 1977

Episcopal Church of the Epiphany is a historic church located in New Iberia, Louisiana. The church was listed on the National Register of Historic Places on April 29, 1977.

It is a one-story 34 by 74 feet (10 m × 23 m) building which was built during 1857–1858 of cypress timbers and bricks that were made by enslaved people. Its side walls were reinforced by exterior buttresses in 1884, when a belfry was also added. It was renovated in 1959.

== See also ==
- National Register of Historic Places listings in Iberia Parish, Louisiana
