= The Magnolias (New Iberia, Louisiana) =

Historic house in Louisiana, United States

- U.S. National Register of Historic Places
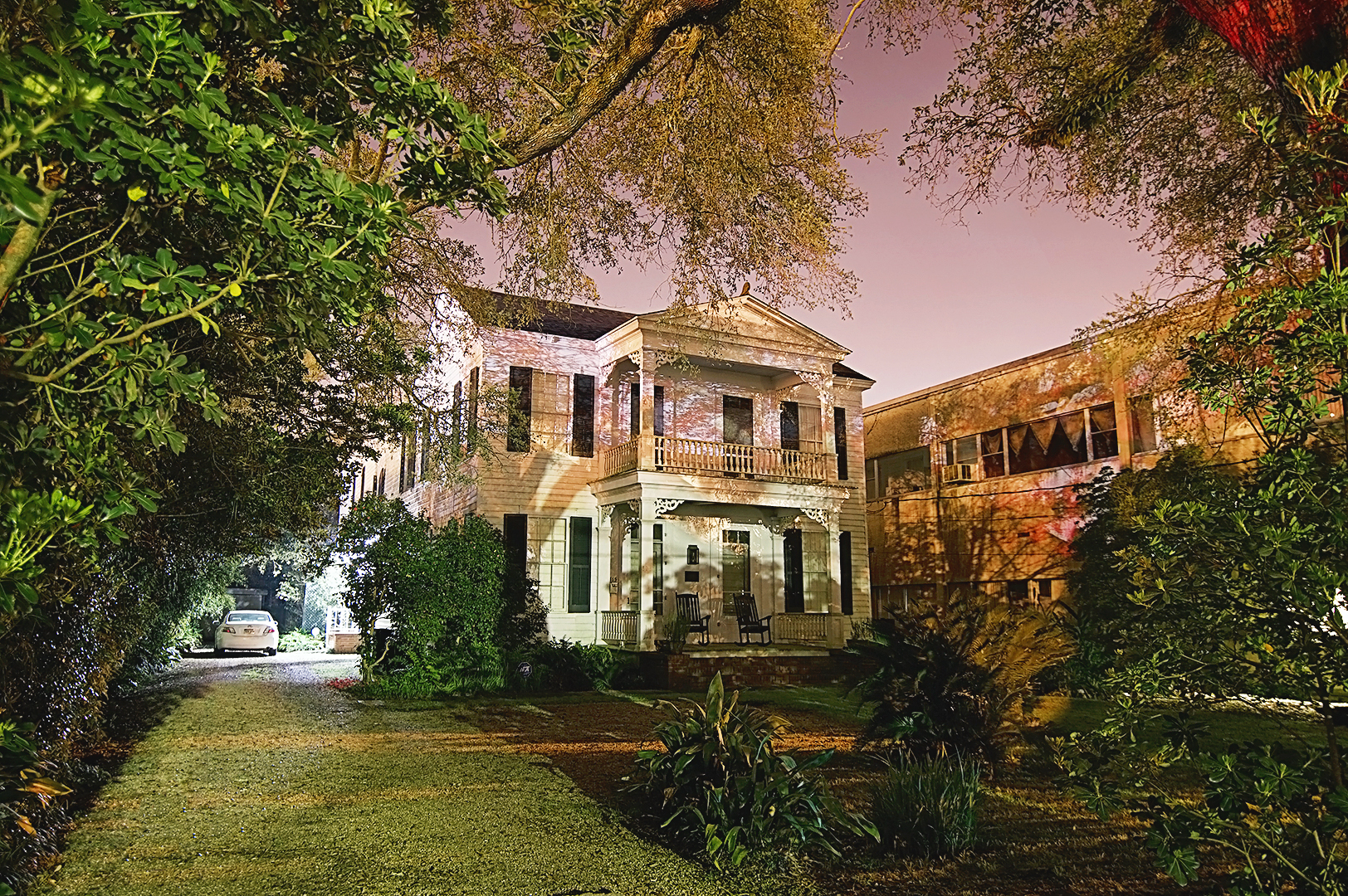

- Location within Louisiana Location within the United States
- Location: 115 Jefferson St. New Iberia, Louisiana
- Coordinates: 30°00′29″N 91°49′16″W
- Area: 0.112 acres (0.045 ha)
- Built: 1852
- Built by: Dr. Henry Stubinger
- Architectural style: Greek Revival, Creole cottage
- NRHP reference No.: 79001065
- Added to NRHP: December 6, 1979

The Magnolias is a historic cottage located at 115 Jefferson Street, in New Iberia, Louisiana.

Built in 1852, the house was modified in about 1920. In 1929 the entire house was moved and rotated 90 degrees, so that it faces Jefferson Street rather than Main Street. It is set back from the street and has modern buildings on each side. The building has a pedimented Greek Revival one-bay portico that is both massive and unusual on a four-bay house.

The house was listed on the National Register of Historic Places on December 6, 1979.

== See also ==
- National Register of Historic Places listings in Iberia Parish, Louisiana
