= Bienville House =

Hotel in New Orleans, United States

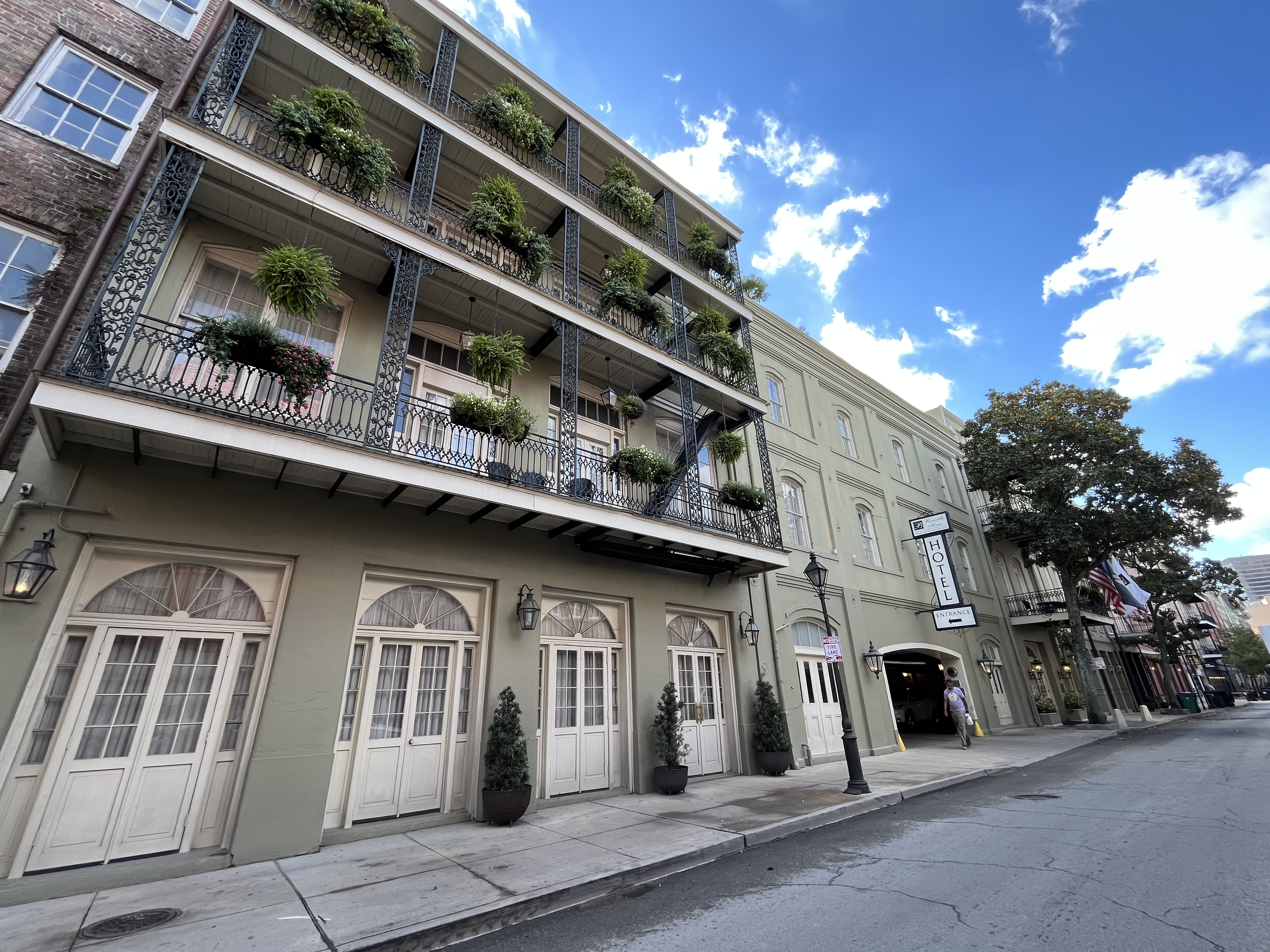

- Location within Louisiana

General information
- Location: 320 Decatur St., New Orleans, Louisiana
- Coordinates: 29.953819°N 90.065255°W

Bienville House, or the Bienville House Hotel, is a hotel in the French Quarter of New Orleans, Louisiana. Its building dates from 1835. It was converted to a hotel in 1967.

The building began as Planters Rice Mill in 1835. It later became a syrup factory, a hotel, a firehouse, and an apartment building known as the Royal Bienville. The Monteleone family purchased the building in 1972 and converted it into the Bienville House Hotel.

A Tiki-themed bar and restaurant opened in the hotel in 2014.

It is a member of the Historic Hotels of America.

== See also ==
- Rice Mill Lofts: another converted rice mill in New Orleans
