= William Weeks Hall =

American artist (1894–1958)

- Born: October 31, 1895; Orleans Parish, Louisiana, U.S.
- Died: June 27, 1958 (aged 63); Louisiana, U.S.
- Education: Pennsylvania Academy of the Fine Arts
- Parents: Gilbert Lewis Hall (father); Mary "Lily" Weeks (mother)

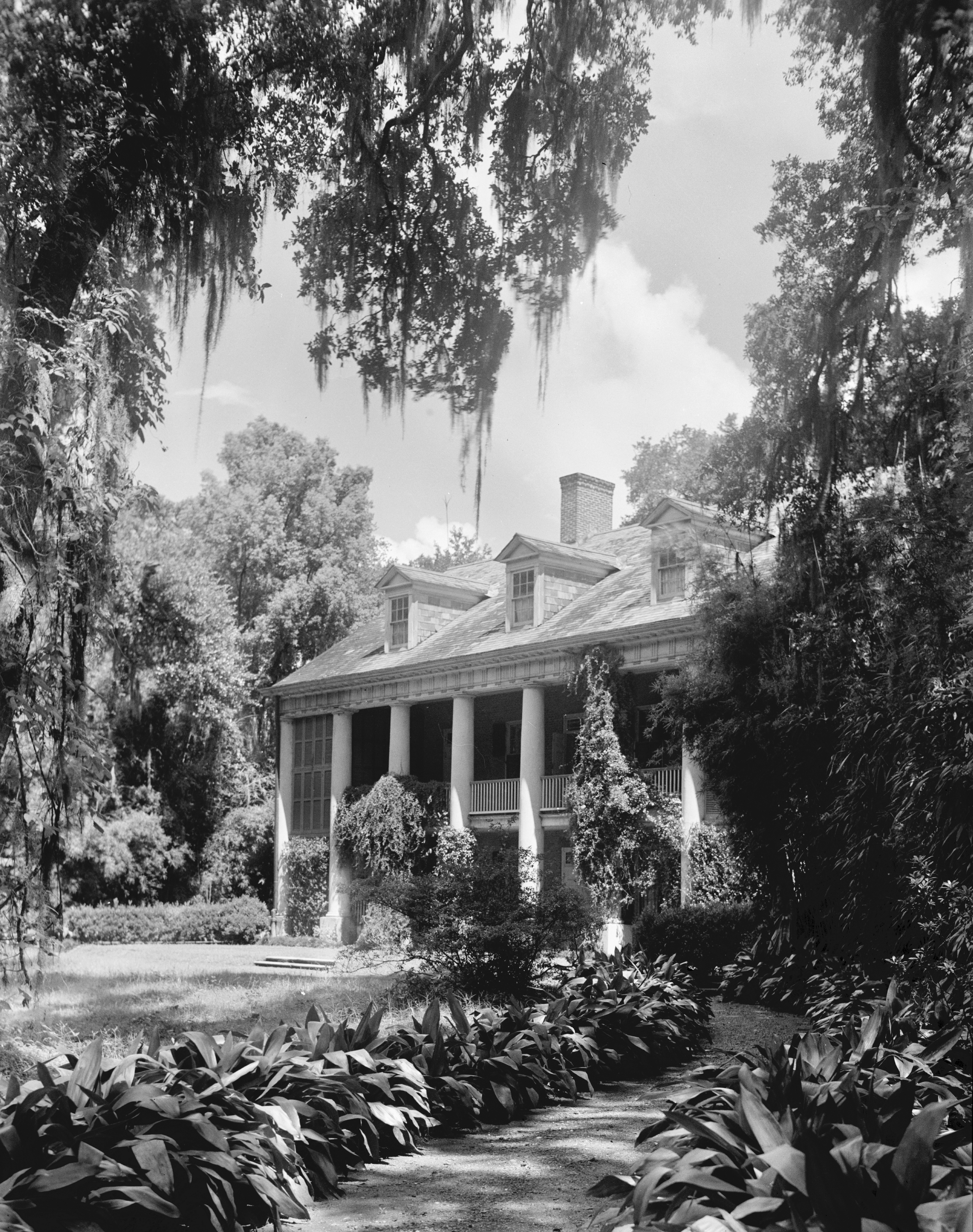
Shadows-on the-Teche plantation (1938), New Iberia, Louisiana

William Weeks Hall (1894–1958), was an American artist, photographer and art critic. He was the last individual owner of the Shadows-on-the-Teche, a historic house and former sugar cane plantation.

== Biography ==
William Weeks Hall was born in October 31, 1894 in Orleans Parish; to parents Gilbert Lewis Hall and Mary "Lily" Weeks. His maternal grandparents David and Mary Conrad Weeks had built the Shadows-on-the-Teche plantation in 1834.

Hall attended the Pennsylvania Academy of the Fine Arts (PAFA). Around 1917, Hall won a scholarship through PAFA to travel to Europe. His early paintings were abstract. He lived in Paris for a few years after college. During World War I (1914–1918), Hall served in the Office of Naval Intelligence.

In 1920, Hall returned to New Iberia and in 1922 he started to restore the Shadows-on-the-Teche. He had many notable guests and friends in the arts that would come visit him in New Iberia including D. W. Griffith, Henry Miller, Cecil B. DeMille, among others. A New Iberian local musician Al E. Dieudonne dedicated his song, "Shadows-on-the-Teche" to Hall in 1930.

In 1927, Hall was a charter member of the New Orleans Art League. He injured his arm in 1937, and was forced to give up painting, and around this time he started to focus more on photography.

== Death and legacy ==
Hall died on June 27, 1958, and was initially buried at the Rose Hill Cemetery. In 1961, his body was moved to the family plot at Shadows-on-the-Teche cemetery. He never married. Hall left the Shadows-on-the-Teche to the National Trust for Historic Preservation after his death.

Hall's art work is including in public museum collections at the Pennsylvania Academy of the Fine Arts. In Henry Miller's book, The Air-Conditioned Nightmare (1945), includes information about his time in New Iberia and Hall is quoted (page 97).
