= Yankee Autumn In Acadiana =

1979 book by David C. Edmonds

Yankee autumn in Acadiana : a narrative of the Great Texas Overland Expedition through southwestern Louisiana, October–December 1863
- Author: David C. Edmonds
- Publisher: Center for Louisiana Studies
- Publication date: 1979
- ISBN: 1-887366-62-8

Yankee Autumn in Acadiana (1979) is a narrative by David C. Edmonds of the invasion of south-western Louisiana by Union troops led by Major General Nathaniel Prentice Banks in October–December 1863. This was Banks' second attempt to conquer Texas after a defeat at Sabine Pass on September 8, 1863.

On October 3, 1863, the men of Major General Nathaniel P. Banks' Union Army of the Gulf marched out of Berwick, Louisiana. Their destination was Texas, their intended route was across the prairies of south-western Louisiana, and their objective was to restore Texas to the Union. The Federals did not make it to Texas but by November 17 were marching back into New Iberia, having gotten no farther than Opelousas. They found their march harassed by swarms of Texas and Louisiana cavalrymen belonging to Major General Richard Taylor's Army of Western Louisiana. The two armies engaged in numerous skirmishes, most of them inconclusive, along the way and fought one real battle. Texans under Brigadier General Tom Green won the Battle of Bayou Bourbeux and almost destroyed an enemy brigade.

== Awards ==
Yankee Autumn in Acadiana won the 1980 Louisiana Literary Award of the Louisiana Library Association.

== David Edmonds ==
David C. Edmonds is a former Associate Professor of Economics and Finance at the University of Southwestern Louisiana in Lafayette, a former Fulbright-Hayes professor and specialist in international and development economics, holds a Ph.D. degree from the American University of Washington, D.C. and has attended The University of Southern Mississippi, University of Notre Dame and Louisiana State University.

Mr. Edmonds' interest in this period of history began when he attempted to unravel the mysteries of an old Acadian-style house on Bayou Carencro near Sunset, Louisiana where he lived with his family.
