= Jeanerette, Louisiana =

- City
- City of Jeanerette
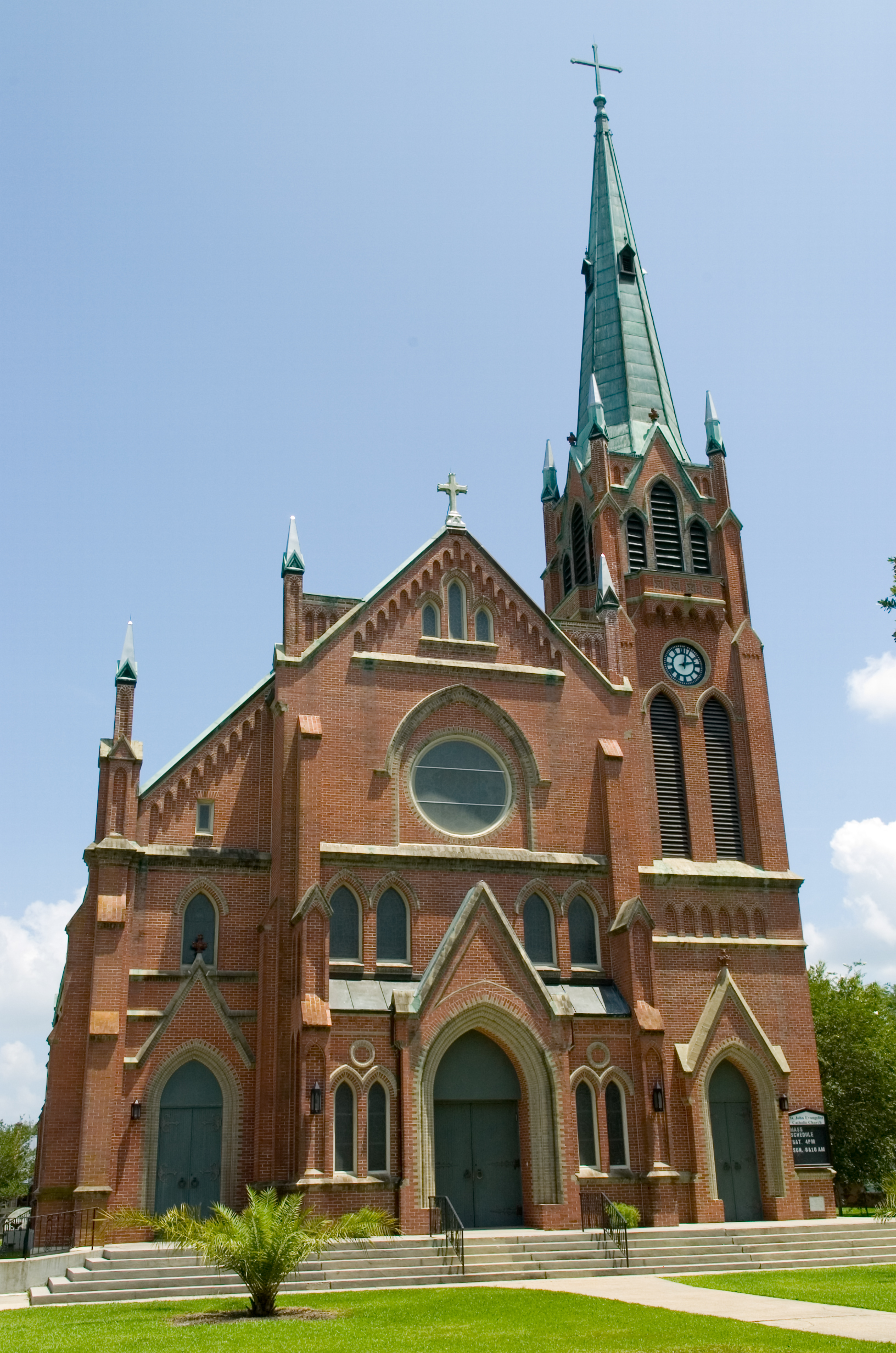
- St. John the Evangelist Roman Catholic Church, Jeanerette
- Nickname: Sugar City
- Anthem: Markae' DEQ
- Location of Jeanerette in Iberia Parish, Louisiana.

- Location of Louisiana in the United States
- Coordinates: 29°54′57″N 91°40′33″W
- Country: United States
- State: Louisiana
- Parish: Iberia

Area
  - Total: 2.36 sq mi (6.12 km^{2})
  - Land: 2.31 sq mi (5.98 km^{2})
  - Water: 0.054 sq mi (0.14 km^{2})
- Elevation: 13 ft (4.0 m)

Population (2020)
  - Total: 4,813
  - Density: 2,085.2/sq mi (805.09/km^{2})
- Time zone: UTC-6 (CST)
  - Summer (DST): UTC-5 (CDT)
- ZIP code: 70544
- Area code: 337
- FIPS code: 22-38075
- GNIS feature ID: 2404794
- Website: www.jeanerette.com

Jeanerette (/ˈdʒɪnˌrɛt/) is a city in Iberia Parish, Louisiana, United States. Known as "Sugar City", Jeanerette had a population of 4,813 as of the 2020 census. It is two-thirds African American, many of them Creoles of color. Jeanerette is the part of the Lafayette metropolitan statistical area; its parish is also one of the 22 included in the Acadiana region, which has had a high proportion of francophones.

== History ==
=== Early years ===
In the 18th century, French colonist Pierre Zerangue acquired the land where Jeanerette developed from the Spanish government. Zerangue received an "order of survey and settlement" from Spain for 1,052 acres (4.26 km^{2}). Under Spanish law, if a person occupied a piece of property for two years, they could apply for title to the land under an "order of survey settlement."

Colonist Nicholas Provost acquired property extending from the present-day experimental farm to the St. Mary Parish line. He engaged in sugar cultivation, based on the labor of enslaved Americans and African Americans, until his death in 1816.

The town derived its name from John W. Jeanerette, a native of South Carolina who had moved to the developing area in the 1820s. First he worked as a tutor for a planter's family, as did numerous educated young adults from northern states in the antebellum period. He opened a store and saloon. Having saved some money, Jeanerette purchased Pine Grove Plantation circa 1830, which was formerly known as Beau Pré (meaning "lovely meadow/pasture").

Jeanerette offered a portion of his house to be used as a mail depository for local residents. Later Jeanerette was appointed as the town's first postmaster (he dropped his middle initial in official records). The name Jeanerette was later adopted for the post office and town.

In 1871, Lazard Wormser, an early Jewish settler to the area emigrated from Alsace, France. He opened a small general store in downtown Jeanerette. He was soon joined by other members of the Wormser family, who later established branches of Wormser's Department Store in downtown New Iberia and Franklin.

During the 19th century, to the north along the Bayou Teche a settlement was developed by free Créoles of color; it is now known as Grand Marais. These free people of color were descended from African and European ancestors. They had largely adopted French culture, Catholicism and language, and were often still French speakers into the 20th century.

=== Incorporation ===
Jeanerette was incorporated as a town in 1878 and Joseph E. Provost became the first mayor; its economy was based on the cypress lumber and sugar industries. Its nickname has been "Sugar City". Although its major growth was after the Civil War, it has some surviving antebellum houses in the city and region.

Sugarcane continues as a key factor in the economy. There were until the 21st century three active sugar mills. The one located in the city was closed, dismantled, and its equipment sold in the first decade of the 21st century. Jeanerette is the home of manufacturers of equipment for the cultivation, harvesting and processing of sugarcane. Today, additional sources of income include oil and natural gas, salt, carbon black, a garment distribution center, and fishing.

Jeanerette was the home of dentist and politician Paul N. Cyr, Huey P. Long's lieutenant governor and political opponent. Cyr had a dental office there.

== Geography ==
The southeastern border of the city is at the Iberia/St. Mary parish line.

Louisiana Highways 182 and 87, which both parallel the Bayou Teche, pass through the city with U.S. Highway 90 running parallel outside the city limits all heading northwest to the cities of New Iberia, the Iberia Parish seat, 12 miles (19 km), Lafayette, the Lafayette Parish seat, 35 miles (56 km), and southeast to the St. Mary Parish cities of Franklin, the parish seat, 14 miles (23 km), and Morgan City, 36 miles (58 km).

According to the United States Census Bureau, the city has a total area of 2.2 square miles (5.7 km^{2}), all land.

=== Climate ===
The climate in this area is characterized by hot, humid summers and generally mild to cool winters. According to the Köppen Climate Classification system, Jeanerette has a humid subtropical climate, abbreviated "Cfa" on climate maps.

Climate data for Jeanerette 5 NW, Louisiana (1991–2020 normals, extremes 1892–present)
Month	Jan	Feb	Mar	Apr	May	Jun	Jul	Aug	Sep	Oct	Nov	Dec	Year
Record high °F (°C)	89 (32)	85 (29)	90 (32)	93 (34)	98 (37)	104 (40)	104 (40)	105 (41)	101 (38)	98 (37)	93 (34)	89 (32)	104 (40)
Mean maximum °F (°C)	75.7 (24.3)	77.5 (25.3)	81.4 (27.4)	85.2 (29.6)	90.1 (32.3)	93.5 (34.2)	94.8 (34.9)	95.5 (35.3)	93.4 (34.1)	88.8 (31.6)	82.9 (28.3)	78.4 (25.8)	96.3 (35.7)
Mean daily maximum °F (°C)	60.9 (16.1)	64.5 (18.1)	71.0 (21.7)	77.1 (25.1)	83.4 (28.6)	88.1 (31.2)	89.6 (32.0)	90.0 (32.2)	86.8 (30.4)	79.6 (26.4)	70.0 (21.1)	63.4 (17.4)	77.0 (25.0)
Daily mean °F (°C)	51.4 (10.8)	55.1 (12.8)	61.3 (16.3)	67.4 (19.7)	74.4 (23.6)	79.9 (26.6)	81.4 (27.4)	81.4 (27.4)	77.7 (25.4)	69.0 (20.6)	59.3 (15.2)	53.6 (12.0)	67.7 (19.8)
Mean daily minimum °F (°C)	41.9 (5.5)	45.7 (7.6)	51.7 (10.9)	57.8 (14.3)	65.3 (18.5)	71.7 (22.1)	73.3 (22.9)	72.7 (22.6)	68.6 (20.3)	58.5 (14.7)	48.7 (9.3)	43.8 (6.6)	58.3 (14.6)
Mean minimum °F (°C)	26.8 (−2.9)	31.7 (−0.2)	35.3 (1.8)	43.4 (6.3)	53.2 (11.8)	65.3 (18.5)	69.1 (20.6)	67.8 (19.9)	57.0 (13.9)	42.8 (6.0)	33.2 (0.7)	29.5 (−1.4)	24.9 (−3.9)
Record low °F (°C)	7 (−14)	3 (−16)	21 (−6)	30 (−1)	42 (6)	52 (11)	58 (14)	56 (13)	40 (4)	29 (−2)	22 (−6)	10 (−12)	3 (−16)
Average precipitation inches (mm)	5.12 (130)	4.00 (102)	3.86 (98)	4.81 (122)	5.06 (129)	7.46 (189)	7.85 (199)	7.28 (185)	6.56 (167)	4.61 (117)	4.10 (104)	4.74 (120)	65.45 (1,662)
Average precipitation days (≥ 0.01 in)	11.4	9.2	8.4	7.8	8.8	13.7	15.2	13.9	11.6	8.1	8.9	10.2	127.2
Source: NOAA

== Demographics ==
Historical population
Census	Pop.	Note	%±
1880	698		—
1890	1,309		87.5%
1900	1,905		45.5%
1910	2,206		15.8%
1920	2,512		13.9%
1930	2,228		−11.3%
1940	3,362		50.9%
1950	4,692		39.6%
1960	5,568		18.7%
1970	6,322		13.5%
1980	6,511		3.0%
1990	6,205		−4.7%
2000	5,997		−3.4%
2010	5,530		−7.8%
2020	4,813		−13.0%
2025 (est.)	4,484	▼	−6.8%
U.S. Decennial Census

Jeanerette racial composition as of 2020
Race	Number	Percentage
White (non-Hispanic)	1,146	23.81%
Black or African American (non-Hispanic)	3,417	71.0%
Native American	2	0.04%
Asian	17	0.35%
Other/Mixed	128	2.66%
Hispanic or Latino	103	2.14%

As of the 2020 United States census, there were 4,813 people, 1,956 households, and 1,324 families residing in the city. At the 2019 American Community Survey, the racial and ethnic makeup of Jeanerette was 21.1% non-Hispanic white, 77.2% Black or African American, and 1.7% Hispanic or Latin American of any race. Of the population, 1.7% were foreign-born residents from 2015 to 2019. The city had an owner-occupied housing rate of 67.8% and the median gross rent was $725. There were 1,956 households at the 2019 estimates and an average of 2.75 persons per household. The median household income was $34,643 and the per capita income was $17,196. At least 25.4% of the population lived at or below the poverty line.

At the 2000 U.S. census, there were 5,997 people, 2,057 households, and 1,513 families residing in the city. The population density was 2,712.0 inhabitants per square mile (1,047.1/km^{2}). There were 2,272 housing units at an average density of 1,027.5 per square mile (396.7/km^{2}). The racial makeup of the city was 38.34% White, 59.70% African American, 0.23% Native American, 0.17% Asian, 0.02% Pacific Islander, 0.58% from other races, and 0.97% from two or more races. Hispanic or Latino of any race were 1.43% of the population.

There were 2,057 households, out of which 35.7% had children under the age of 18 living with them, 42.2% were married couples living together, 26.2% had a female householder with no husband present, and 26.4% were non-families. 24.0% of all households were made up of individuals, and 10.8% had someone living alone who was 65 years of age or older. The average household size was 2.92 and the average family size was 3.46. In the city, the population was spread out, with 31.6% under the age of 18, 10.7% from 18 to 24, 24.9% from 25 to 44, 20.4% from 45 to 64, and 12.4% who were 65 years of age or older. The median age was 32 years. For every 100 females, there were 86.1 males. For every 100 females age 18 and over, there were 80.9 males. The median income for a household in the city was $22,888, and the median income for a family was $26,810. Males had a median income of $36,170 versus $15,000 for females. The per capita income for the city was $11,871. About 31.2% of families and 34.2% of the population were below the poverty line, including 46.7% of those under age 18 and 23.3% of those age 65 or over.

== Education ==
Iberia Parish School System serves Jeanerette. Area secondary schools include:

- Jeanerette High School (9–12) (in a nearby unincorporated area)
- Jeanerette Middle School (7–8) (Jeanerette)

Jeanerette Elementary School is public and K–6. In addition St. Charles Elementary School, K-6, is also in Jeanerette.

The school system previously operated Canal Elementary School (K-2) in Jeanerette.

St. Joseph School, a private Catholic school (of the Roman Catholic Diocese of Lafayette in Louisiana), served grades K–8 until May, 2011.

The Bureau of Indian Affairs sponsors the Chitimacha Day School southwest of Jeanerette in the Charenton community of unincorporated St. Mary Parish.

== Notable people ==
- Alexander Allain-1920 – 1994. Lawyer and library advocate known for his work securing the freedom of expression.
- Bret Allain—current District 21 state senator; St. Mary Parish sugar cane farmer
- Stuart Bishop—born in Jeanerette, he became a State representative for Lafayette Parish.
- Paul N. Cyr, Jeanerette dentist who served as lieutenant governor from 1928 to 1932 under Huey Long
- Hiram Eugene (born November 24, 1980) is a former American football safety in the National Football League (NFL).
- Troy Hebert—former Commissioner of the Louisiana Office of Alcohol and Tobacco Control

== See also ==
- Albania Sugar Plantation: right over the city line in St. Mary Parish, Louisiana
- List of cities in Louisiana
