= Interstate 49 in Louisiana =

Highway in Louisiana

Interstate 49
- I-49 highlighted in red

Route information
- Maintained by Louisiana DOTD
- Length: 247.219 mi (397.860 km) 244.021 mi (392.714 km) opened (Note: For the federal government's purposes, the FHWA lists Louisiana's completed portions of I-49 as totaling 239.25 miles (385.04 km) in length.)
- Existed: July 1982–present
- NHS: Entire route

Southern segment
- South end: I-10 / US 167 / LA 182 in Lafayette
- Major intersections: US 190 in Opelousas; US 167 near Opelousas; US 71 / US 167 in Alexandria; US 71 / US 165 in Alexandria; US 371 / LA 177 near Coushatta; US 84 near Mansfield
- North end: I-20 / Pete Harris Drive in Shreveport

Northern segment
- South end: I-220 in Shreveport
- Major intersections: US 71 from Gilliam to Hosston
- North end: I-49 at the Arkansas state line in Ida

Location
- Country: United States
- State: Louisiana
- Parishes: Lafayette, St. Landry, Evangeline, Avoyelles, Rapides, Natchitoches, DeSoto, Caddo

Highway system
- Interstate Highway System; Main; Auxiliary; Suffixed; Business; Future; Louisiana State Highway System; Interstate; US; State; Scenic
← LA 48	→ LA 49

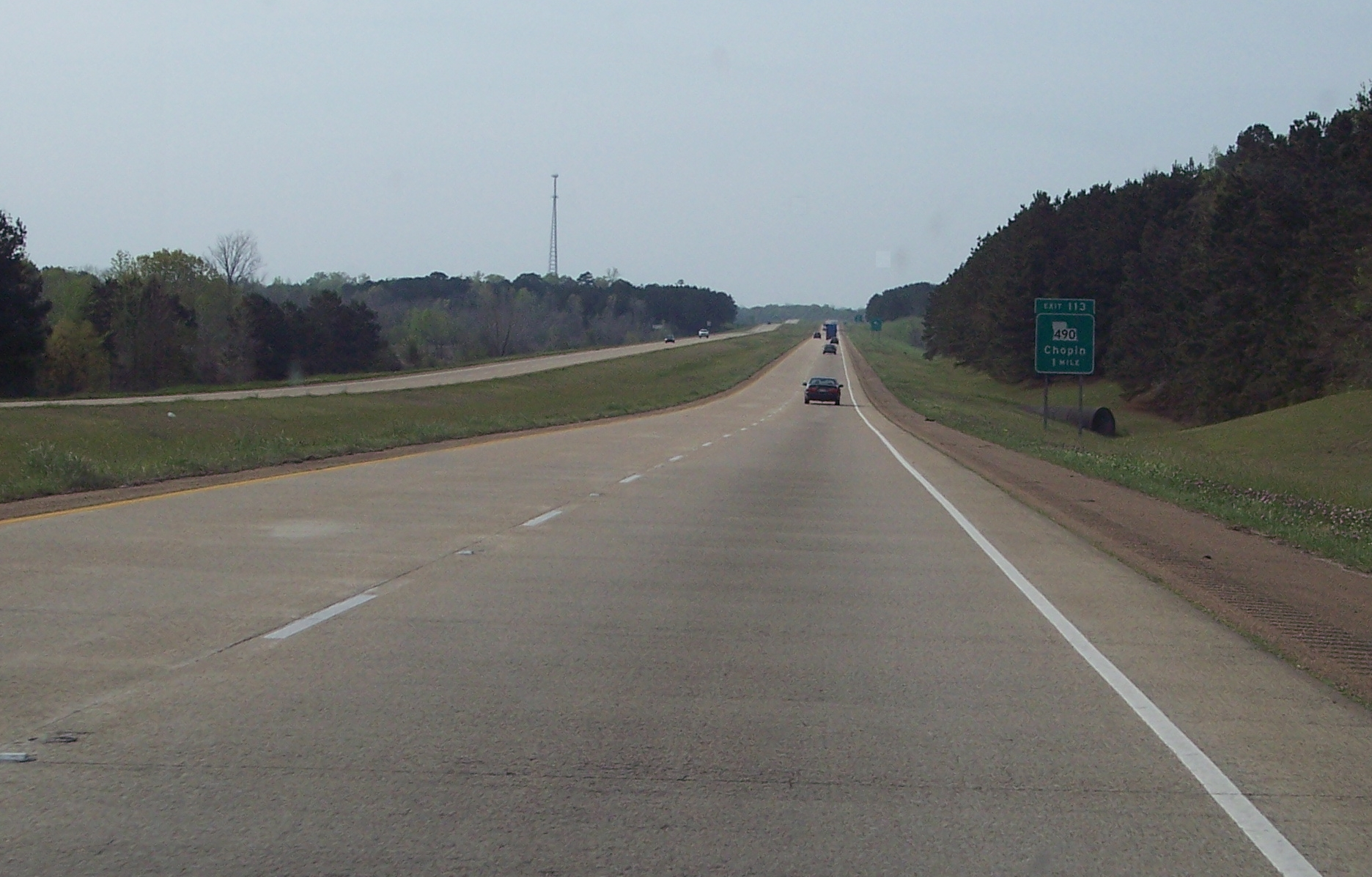
I-49 near Chopin

Interstate 49 (I-49) is an Interstate Highway that spans 244.02 miles (392.71 km) in a north–south direction in the US state of Louisiana. As of 2023, I-49 runs from I-10 in Lafayette to the Arkansas state line. I-49 greatly parallels the older US Highway 71 (US 71) corridor, and connects the state's two east–west Interstates at two of its metropolitan centers. Along the way, it serves the cities of Opelousas, Alexandria, Natchitoches, and Shreveport, intersecting several cross-state highways, such as I-20, US 190, US 167, US 165, and US 84.

I-49 was an intrastate Interstate Highway until December 12, 2012, when the designation was officially approved for an upgraded portion of US 71 in Missouri running from Joplin north to Kansas City. A southern extension of the route from Lafayette to New Orleans is planned along the US 90 corridor, when completed, I-49 will run continuously from Texarkana to New Orleans.

== Route description ==
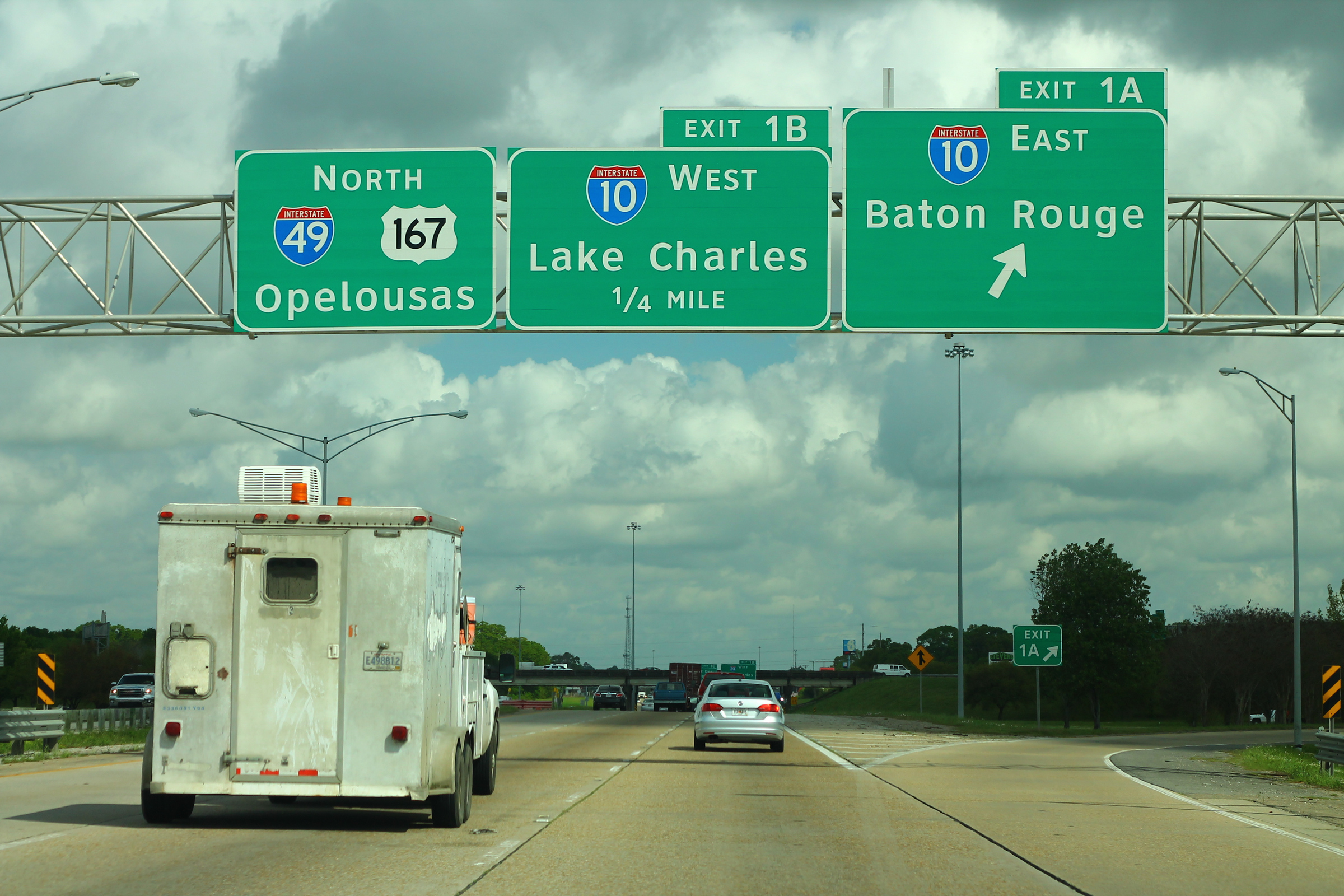
I-49 northbound at its southern terminus in Lafayette

I-49 begins its journey in Lafayette concurrent with US 167 from I-10 to Opelousas at exit 23. At Lafayette, motorists continuing southbound see the Interstate Highway change to LA 182 (Evangeline Thruway), a major thoroughfare taking travelers toward the heart of Lafayette. North of Lafayette, motorists on I-49 will parallel the ancient Mississippi river bed north of Carencro and through Grand Coteau, just south of Opelousas.

After leaving Opelousas, I-49 traverses the relatively flat, fertile farmlands until reaching Alexandria. From there, the highway roughly follows the Red River and Louisiana Highway 1 (LA 1), bypassing the historic city of Natchitoches to the west on its way to Shreveport. At Shreveport, the highway parallels a railroad line just to the west until its terminus at I-20 southwest of downtown.

On the northside of Shreveport, the route resumes at I-220 before having interchanges with LA 3194 and LA 1 before traveling northward through Caddo Parish, passing between the small communities of Gilliam and Hosston. I-49 crosses the Arkansas state line just north of Ida and proceeds toward the city of Texarkana.

The heaviest traffic on I-49 occurs within the cities of Shreveport and Opelousas. The stretch of freeway in Shreveport sees an average of 70,000 vehicles per day, while the stretch of freeway between Lafayette and Carencro sees an average of 55,000 vehicles per day, and the stretch of freeway through Opelousas sees an average of 45,000 vehicles per day between the Judson Walsh Drive and Creswell Lane exits.

During the sugarcane season, there are a large number of trucks and tractors pulling heavy cane wagons, causing traffic congestion and accidents.

== History ==
The original plans for Interstate Highways in Louisiana only included I-10 and I-20 with no connection in between. After I-55 was added in the 1950s, the state considered building a toll road to connect I-10 in southwestern Louisiana and I-20 in the northern part of the state but later rejected the idea.

=== I-49 original ===
In the mid-1970s, the Federal Highway Administration (FHWA) approved an Interstate Highway to run between I-10 and I-20, beginning at I-10 in Lafayette and ending at I-20 in Shreveport. The mileage was gained from mileage released from other highways the states did not build as well as 153 miles (246 km) from a supplemental reserve.

Construction of I-49 began in 1978, with the first signed segment running concurrent with US 167 from I-10 to US 190 in Opelousas, opening in July 1982. Shortly afterwards, an additional section was opened to Washington. After several delays, most of the highway was open by the early 1990s. The entire length of the 212-mile (341 km) road was completed May 1, 1996, when a 16.6-mile (26.7 km) section of highway in Alexandria, named the Martin Luther King Jr. Highway, was completed. The total cost of I-49's construction was about $1.38 billion (equivalent to $2.54 billion in 2024).

=== I-49 North ===
I-49 North is a 36-mile (58 km) construction project that connected I-220 in Shreveport to the Arkansas state line and has been divided into 11 segments. On November 27, 2013, the first 18.9-mile (30.4 km) section between LA 1 and US 71 opened to traffic; the section to just south of the Arkansas state line opened in March 2014. The segment from Shreveport to the Arkansas state line was opened in early 2015. The portion between I-220 and LA 1, which includes an interchange with LA 3194, was estimated to be completed in early 2018. On May 31, 2017, 4.25 miles (6.84 km) of this section, extending from LA 3194 to LA 1, was opened only to northbound traffic. On June 15, 2018, the entire 5.25-mile (8.45 km) portion of I-49 between I-220 and LA 1, including an interchange with I-220, was opened to traffic. On October 17, 2018, the remaining interchange ramps were opened to traffic, making I-49 continuous from I-220 in Shreveport to the Arkansas state line.

== Future ==
=== I-49 Geaux South ===
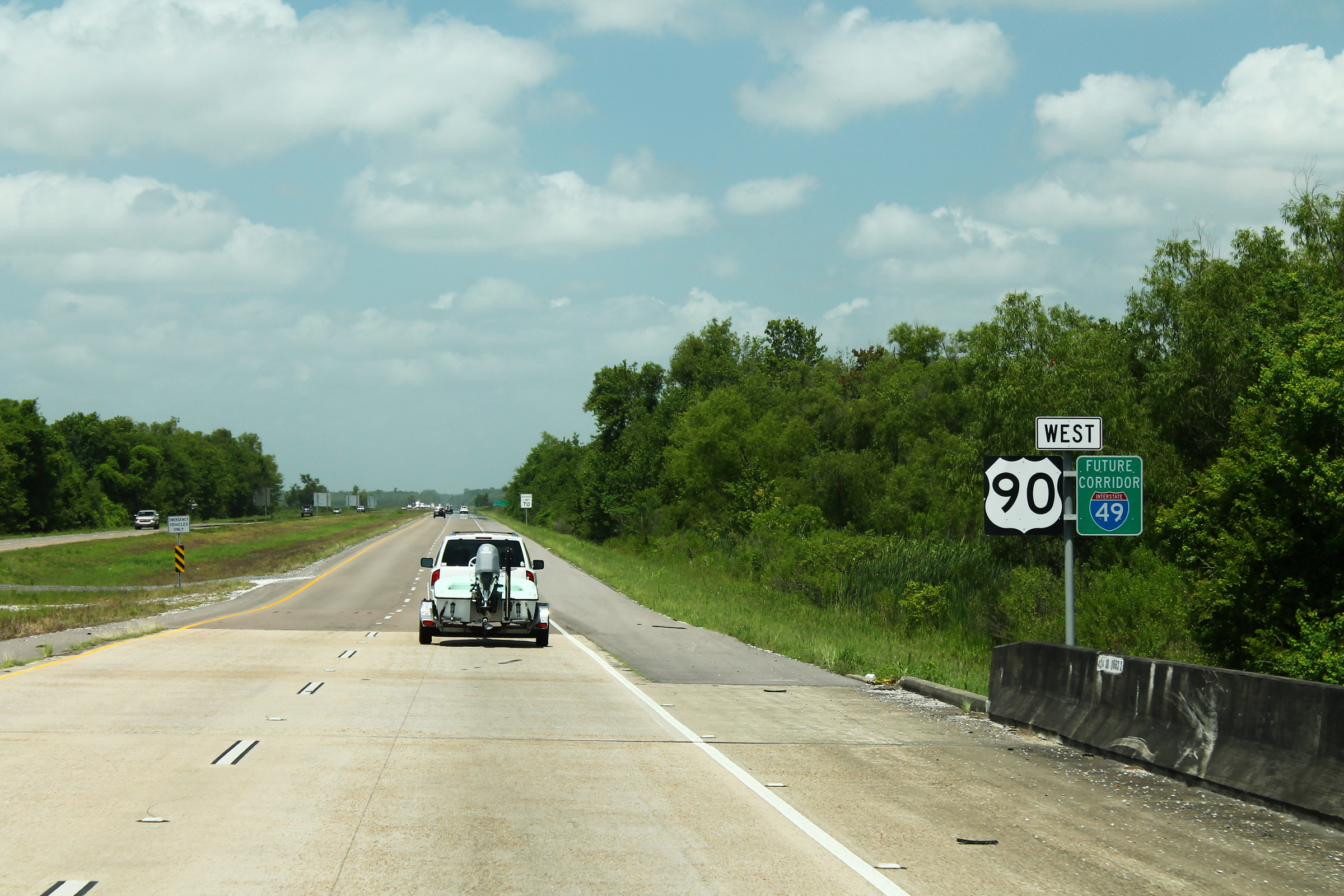
US 90 West and Future I-49 Corridor signs near Raceland in 2014.

The Louisiana Department of Transportation and Development (DOTD) is working to extend I-49 from its current terminus in Lafayette south and east to New Orleans along the existing US 90 corridor. The project is officially referred to as the "Interstate 49 Geaux South" program, or more commonly, "I-49 South". The part in Lafayette is known as the Lafayette Connector. This portion of US 90 is presently a divided four- and six-lane highway with several sections of freeway completed between Broussard and Raceland. In the New Orleans area, I-49 is planned to follow US 90 Business (US 90 Bus.; Westbank Expressway; hidden Interstate 910) through Westwego, Gretna, and across the Mississippi River via the Crescent City Connection to a terminus at I-10 in the New Orleans Central Business District. "Future I-49" signage is visible along this portion of the corridor. If this extension is completed, I-49 will meet I-10 twice, but there are many obstacles in the completion of the I-49 corridor in Louisiana. Cost has been an ongoing issue from the beginning, and this only increases yearly. In September 2015, however, DOTD Secretary Sherri H. LeBas stated, "Completing I-49 South is a top priority for DOTD".

=== I-49 Lafayette Connector ===
In April 2015, the DOTD accepted proposals for an upcoming design–build project to construct an interchange at the junction of US 90 and LA 318, which is located in St. Mary Parish between Jeanerette and Baldwin. LA 318 travels southward from the St. Mary Sugar Co-Op on LA 182 at Sorrel and crosses US 90 at-grade on the way to the Port of West St. Mary. The interchange is one of many projects along the projected I-49 corridor that is expected to improve traffic flow, safety, and hurricane evacuation. On April 27, 2018, the DOTD celebrated the opening of the junction of US 90 and LA 318 with a ribbon-cutting ceremony.

In the Lafayette area, the project is divided into two projects, the "I-49 Connector" and the rest of the Interstate from Lafayette Regional Airport to LA 88. The I-49 Connector has a record of decision and is in the process of formulating the environmental impact statement. It is projected to follow the existing path of the Evangeline Thruway, a divided six-lane surface roadway that passes just to the east of the downtown area. Much of the proposed 5.5 miles (8.9 km) will be elevated and is expected to cost between $750 and $850 million, making it the costliest portion of the entire 160-mile (260 km) route to be constructed. As of October 2015, engineer planning has not begun nor has funding been secured for the project. Planning for this segment has been ongoing for decades, but construction has been delayed numerous times due to local opposition. The most recent attempt to begin construction was halted due to federal officials launching civil rights investigation into the project in early 2023 and there are calls for the planning of this segment to be abandoned. However, as of November 2023, the DOTD still plans to build this segment. The Lafayette City and Parish Councils have passed multiple resolutions to proceed with the project with the most recent one being passed by the Louisiana State Legislature in late-May 2024. Before funding can be secured and construction can begin, the Supplemental Environmental Impact Statement (SEIS) and the Secondary Record of Decision (SROD) is required first. It's set to be done by the end of 2026. The remainder of the distance between the airport and LA 88 is planned to be a six-lane at-grade freeway with a two-mile (3.2 km) segment of eight-lane elevated freeway through the neighboring city of Broussard. The planning is in cooperation with the Lafayette Metropolitan Planning Organization (MPO).

=== I-49 South ===
The DOTD started construction of US 90 (I-49 South) and the Albertson Parkway. Construction began in 2014 and finished in 2019. The northern construction project limit is 500 feet (150 m) north of the US 90/Celebrity Drive intersection. The southerly corridor construction project limit as measured along US 90 is approximately 1,100 feet (340 m) north of the US 90/Ambassador Caffery intersection. The limit for work on LA 182 extends from LA 96 to 100 feet (30 m) north of Celebrity Drive. The project was approximately 2.4 miles (3.9 km) in length and includes two new frontage roads and construction of mainline interchange structures at the intersection of US 90 and Albertson Parkway and a bridge structure over the BNSF Railway line. The Albertson Parkway section of the project completed construction in October 2019.

On August 22, 2022, the DOTD announced the start of a $136.52-million project to construct a new interchange at Ambassador Caffery Parkway and US 90 (future I-49). On November 14, 2022, Governor John Bel Edwards was joined by the DOTD along with other state and local officials to celebrate the start of the Ambassador Caffery Interchange in Broussard. It is scheduled for completion in late spring 2026. Construction began in 2022 and finished in 2026.

=== Shreveport area ===
The DOTD is also in the process of closing the last gap in the "I-49 North" project between I-20 and I-220 in Shreveport. A direct connection through Shreveport, known as the Inner-City Connector, is controversial since its path is projected to pass through the residential Allendale neighborhood, which would necessitate the displacement of many of its residents. A no-build alternative would route through traffic via the existing LA 3132 (Inner Loop Expressway) and I-220 alignments after necessary improvements to those highways are carried out. On March 5, 2016, a small group of Allendale residents, known as the LOOP-IT group, held a rally to protest against the Inner City Connector but voiced support for a business boulevard serving local traffic. In January 2023, a new route was revealed where it would not impact Allendale. In May 2023, the Louisiana Department of Transportation and Development (DOTD) secretary Eric Kalivoda announced that a route and design, in other words, Record of Decision (ROD) could be established by 2026 with a groundbreaking following about three years later. Although public opposition to the connector, which would cost about $1 billion to construct, remains strong, this proposal has had a more positive response than previous ones.

== Exit list ==
Parish	Location	mi	km	Exit	Destinations	Notes
Lafayette	Lafayette	0.000	0.000		LA 182 south – Lafayette	Current southern terminus; former US 167
Lafayette	Lafayette			1	I-10 (US 167 south / LA 182 north) – Baton Rouge, Lake Charles	Southbound exit and northbound entrance; southern end of US 167 concurrency; signed as exits 1A (east) and 1B (west); exit 103B on I-10; cloverleaf interchange
Lafayette	Lafayette	0.926– 1.684	1.490– 2.710	1C	Pont Des Mouton Road	
Lafayette	Lafayette–Carencro line	2.520– 3.249	4.056– 5.229	2	LA 98 (Gloria Switch Road)	
Lafayette	Carencro	4.463– 5.108	7.183– 8.221	4	LA 726 – Carencro	Eastern terminus of LA 726; to LA 1252 via frontage roads
Lafayette	Carencro	7.369– 8.182	11.859– 13.168	7	LA 182	
St. Landry	Grand Coteau	11.095– 11.853	17.856– 19.076	11	LA 93 – Grand Coteau, Sunset	
St. Landry	Opelousas	15.804– 16.406	25.434– 26.403	15	LA 3233 (Harry Guilbeau Road)	Eastern terminus of LA 3233
St. Landry	Opelousas	17.316– 17.973	27.867– 28.925	17	Judson Walsh Drive	
St. Landry	Opelousas	18.619– 19.213	29.964– 30.920	18	LA 31 (Creswell Lane)	To Evangeline Downs Racetrack & Casino
St. Landry		19.453– 20.346	31.307– 32.744	19	US 190 – Opelousas, Baton Rouge	Signed northbound as exits 19A (east) and 19B (west)
St. Landry		23.265– 24.075	37.441– 38.745	23	US 167 north / LA 744 – Ville Platte	Northern end of US 167 concurrency; western terminus of LA 744
St. Landry	Washington	25.376– 25.695	40.839– 41.352	25	LA 103 – Washington, Port Barre	
St. Landry		27.378– 28.256	44.061– 45.474	27	LA 10 – Lebeau	To Washington via LA 10 west; LA 10 is concurrent with LA 182 (not signed here)
St. Landry		34.610– 35.311	55.699– 56.828	Grand Prairie Rest Area		
Evangeline	No major junctions					
St. Landry		40.263– 40.951	64.797– 65.904	40	LA 29 – Ville Platte	
Evangeline	No major junctions					
Avoyelles		46.851– 47.538	75.399– 76.505	46	LA 106 – St. Landry	LA 106 eastbound to Bunkie, westbound to Chicot State Park and Louisiana State Arboretum
Avoyelles	Bunkie	53.656– 54.490	86.351– 87.693	53	LA 115 – Bunkie	
Evangeline	No major junctions					
Rapides		56.841– 57.580	91.477– 92.666	56	LA 181 – Cheneyville	
Rapides		61.280– 62.015	98.621– 99.803	61	US 167 – Meeker, Turkey Creek	
Rapides	Lecompte	66.754– 67.399	107.430– 108.468	66	LA 112 – Lecompte, Forest Hill	
Rapides	Woodworth	73.333– 74.251	118.018– 119.495	73	LA 3265 / PR 22 – Woodworth	Eastern terminus of LA 3265; western terminus of PR 22
Rapides	Alexandria	80.250– 81.461	129.150– 131.099	80	US 71 / US 167 south (MacArthur Drive) US 71 Byp. begins	Southern end of US 71 Byp. / US 167 concurrency; no southbound exit to US 71 north (signed at exit 81) or northbound entrance from southbound US 71; exit 63 on US 71
Rapides	Alexandria	82.159– 82.198	132.222– 132.285	81	LA 3250 (Sugarhouse Road) to US 71 north (MacArthur Drive)	Northbound entrance and southbound exit
Rapides	Alexandria	83.586– 84.412	134.519– 135.848	83	Broadway Avenue	
Rapides	Alexandria	84.693– 85.617	136.300– 137.787	84	US 167 north / LA 28 east (Pineville Expressway) / LA 1 (Casson Street)	Northern end of US 167 concurrency; southern end of LA 28 concurrency; no southbound exit to LA 1 (signed at exit 85A); to LA 28 Bus. via LA 1 west
Rapides	Alexandria	85.034– 86.369	136.849– 138.997	85A	M. L. King Drive / Elliott Street to LA 1 – Downtown Alexandria	Signed northbound as M. L. King Drive, southbound as Elliott Street to LA 1
Rapides	Alexandria	85.637– 85.715	137.819– 137.945	85B	Monroe Street / Medical Center Drive	Northbound exit and southbound entrance
Rapides	Alexandria	86.395– 87.406	139.039– 140.666	86	US 71 / US 165 / LA 28 west (MacArthur Drive) US 71 Byp. ends	Northern end of US 71 Byp. / LA 28 concurrency; exit 71 on US 71
Rapides	Alexandria	90.300– 91.253	145.324– 146.857	90	LA 498 (Air Base Road)	Western terminus of LA 498; to Alexandria International Airport (England Airpark)
Rapides	Boyce	94.579– 95.470	152.210– 153.644	94	PR 23 (Rapides Station Road)	Location also known as Rapides
Rapides	Boyce	98.700– 98.926	158.842– 159.206	98	LA 1 – Boyce	Northbound exit and southbound entrance
Rapides	Boyce	99.528– 100.587	160.175– 161.879	99	LA 8 east / LA 1200 – Boyce	Southern end of LA 8 concurrency; to Colfax via LA 8 east
Rapides	Rodemacher	103.353– 103.923	166.331– 167.248	103	LA 8 west – Flatwoods	Northern end of LA 8 concurrency; to LA 1 via LA 8 Spur (signed as LA 8)
Rapides	Lena	107.728– 108.598	173.371– 174.772	107	Lena	
Natchitoches	Chopin	113.719– 114.539	183.013– 184.333	113	LA 490 – Chopin	
Natchitoches	Derry	119.223– 120.090	191.871– 193.266	119	LA 119 – Cloutierville	To Gorum via LA 119 west
Natchitoches	Cypress	127.708– 128.661	205.526– 207.060	127	LA 120 – Cypress, Flora	To Cane River Creole National Historical Park and Oakland Plantation
Natchitoches	Natchitoches	132.770– 133.455	213.673– 214.775	132	LA 478	
Natchitoches	Natchitoches	138.215– 138.858	222.435– 223.470	138	LA 6 – Natchitoches, Many	To Toledo Bend Reservoir and Northwestern State University
Natchitoches		142.865– 143.564	229.919– 231.044	142	PR 547 (Posey Road)	
Natchitoches	Allen	148.728– 149.745	239.355– 240.991	148	LA 485 – Allen, Powhatan	
Natchitoches		155.164– 156.113	249.712– 251.240	155	LA 174 – Ajax, Lake End	
DeSoto		162.671– 163.519	261.794– 263.158	162	US 371 / LA 177 – Pleasant Hill, Coushatta	Southern terminus of US 371
DeSoto		169.743– 170.574	273.175– 274.512	169	Asseff Road	
DeSoto		172.814– 173.608	278.117– 279.395	172	US 84 – Grand Bayou, Mansfield	To Mansfield State Historic Site and Toledo Bend State Park
DeSoto		177.594– 178.219	285.810– 286.816	177	LA 509 – Carmel	
DeSoto		186.302– 187.097	299.824– 301.103	186	LA 175 – Kingston, Frierson	
DeSoto	Stonewall	191.639– 192.345	308.413– 309.549	191	LA 3276 / PR 16 – Stonewall	Eastern terminus of LA 3276; western terminus of PR 16
DeSoto	Stonewall			193	I-69	Proposed
Caddo		196.779– 197.613	316.685– 318.027	196	Southern Loop	
Caddo	Shreveport	199.616– 200.532	321.251– 322.725	199	LA 526 (Bert Kouns-Industrial Loop)	
Caddo	Shreveport	200.891– 202.063	323.303– 325.189	201	LA 3132 – Dallas, Texarkana	Exit 7 on LA 3132 (Inner Loop Expressway)
Caddo	Shreveport	202.907– 203.538	326.547– 327.563	202	LA 511 (East 70th Street)	
Caddo	Shreveport	203.823– 204.497	328.021– 329.106	203	Hollywood Avenue, Pierremont Road	
Caddo	Shreveport	205.578– 206.298	330.846– 332.004	205	Kings Highway	
Caddo	Shreveport	206.515– 207.273	332.354– 333.574	206	I-20 – Monroe, Dallas	No northbound entrance; to Bossier City via I-20 east; exit 17B on I-20
Caddo	Shreveport	207.293	333.606		Pete Harris Drive, Murphy Street	Northern terminus; at-grade intersection
Caddo	Shreveport	Gap in route				
Caddo	Shreveport	210.491– 211.583	338.752– 340.510	210	I-220 – Monroe, Dallas	Southern terminus; exit 6 on I-220; signed as exits 210A (east) & 210B (west)
Caddo	Shreveport	212.112– 212.702	341.361– 342.311	211	LA 3194 (Dr. M. L. King, Jr. Drive)	
Caddo		215.917– 216.622	347.485– 348.619	215	LA 1 (North Market Street)	
Caddo		221.488– 222.166	356.450– 357.542	221	LA 173 – Dixie, Blanchard	
Caddo		223.430– 224.162	359.576– 360.754	223	LA 169 – Mooringsport	
Caddo		228.213– 229.146	367.273– 368.775	228	LA 530 – Belcher, Oil City	
Caddo		231.503– 232.216	372.568– 373.715	231	LA 170 – Gilliam, Vivian	
Caddo		234.262– 235.010	377.008– 378.212	234	US 71 – Hosston, Gilliam	
Caddo		237.289– 238.249	381.880– 383.425	237	LA 2 – Hosston, Plain Dealing	
Caddo		241.473– 242.007	388.613– 389.473	241	PR 16 – Mira	
Caddo	Ida	245.145– 246.034	394.523– 395.953	245	LA 168 – Ida, Rodessa	
Caddo		247.219	397.860		I-49 north – Texarkana	Continuation into Arkansas
1.000 mi = 1.609 km; 1.000 km = 0.621 mi: Concurrency terminus; Incomplete access

== Notes ==
Interstate 49
Previous state: Terminus	Louisiana	Next state: Arkansas
