= List of signed parish roads in Louisiana =

Parish Roads in Louisiana
- Standard parish highway marker used in Louisiana

System information
- Maintained by various local parish governments

Highway names
- Parish: Parish Road X (PR X)

System links
- Louisiana State Highway System; Interstate; US; State; Scenic

Parish Roads in Louisiana include all public roadways that are controlled and maintained by the local government of the parish in which they are located.

The existence of a system of parish roads signed as touring routes varies greatly by parish. To most motorists in Louisiana, the only visible parish roads with numerical designations are the few that appear on state-maintained signage at various Interstate Highway exits.

This list includes all nine instances where a parish road intersects an Interstate Highway and features MUTCD standard signage installed by the Louisiana Department of Transportation and Development (La DOTD), the state's highway agency. It also includes several examples of parish roads that are signed by the state due to their proximity to an Interstate Highway or their status as part of an interstate frontage road.

== Caddo Parish Road 16 ==
Mira Myrtis Road
- Location: Caddo Parish
- Length: 6.199 mi (9.976 km)

Caddo Parish Road 16 (PR 16) runs 6.20 miles (9.98 km) in an east–west direction from LA 1 north of Myrtis to US 71 in Mira. It is locally known as Mira Myrtis Road.

PR 16 is only signed from intersecting state highways by La DOTD. The designation is most visible on the exit signage for its interchange with I-49 at Mira. The posted speed limit is 55 mph (90 km/h).

The entire highway is in Caddo Parish.

Location	mi	km	Destinations	Notes
Myrtis	6.199	9.976	LA 1 – Vivian, Rodessa	Western terminus
Mira	0.470– 0.326	0.756– 0.525	I-49 – Shreveport, Texarkana	Exit 241 on I-49
Mira	0.000	0.000	US 71 – Hosston, Ida	Eastern terminus
1.000 mi = 1.609 km; 1.000 km = 0.621 mi

== DeSoto Parish Road 16 ==
Stonewall-Frierson Road
- Location: DeSoto Parish
- Length: 5.030 mi (8.095 km)

DeSoto Parish Road 16 (PR 16) runs 5.03 miles (8.10 km) in a general northwest to southeast direction from the junction of I-49 and LA 3276 in Stonewall to LA 175 in Frierson. It is locally known as Stonewall-Frierson Road.

PR 16 is only signed at the I-49 interchange by La DOTD. The posted speed limit is 45 mph (70 km/h).

The entire highway is in DeSoto Parish.

Location	mi	km	Destinations	Notes
Stonewall	0.000	0.000	I-49 – Shreveport, Alexandria LA 3276 west – Stonewall	Western terminus of PR 16; eastern terminus of LA 3276; exit 191
Frierson	5.030	8.095	LA 175 – Kingston	Eastern terminus
1.000 mi = 1.609 km; 1.000 km = 0.621 mi

== Lincoln Parish Road 106 ==
Tarbutton Road
- Location: Lincoln Parish
- Length: 1.590 mi (2.559 km)

Lincoln Parish Road 106 (PR 106) runs 1.59 miles (2.56 km) in a north–south direction from the junction of LA 818 and LA 150 between Grambling and Ruston to LA 544 northwest of Ruston. It is locally known as Tarbutton Road.

PR 106 is signed at its interchange with I-20 west of Ruston. It is also signed by La DOTD immediately north and south of this interchange, though no signage has been posted on the state highways that PR 106 connects to.

PR 106's interchange with I-20 was completed and opened to the public in June 2020. Construction for the $25.5 million project began in 2017 and has been planned as far back at the 1990s. This route was likely signed at the same time with the interchange's construction.

The entire highway is in Lincoln Parish.

Location	mi	km	Destinations	Notes
Grambling	0.000	0.000	LA 150 – Simsboro, Ruston LA 818 south – Woodville	Southern terminus
	0.335– 0.524	0.539– 0.843	I-20 – Shreveport, Monroe	Exit 83 on I-20
Ruston	1.590	2.559	LA 544 – Antioch	Northern terminus
1.000 mi = 1.609 km; 1.000 km = 0.621 mi

== Livingston Parish Road 45 ==
South Satsuma Road
- Location: Livingston Parish
- Length: 8.938 mi (14.384 km)

Livingston Parish Road 45 (PR 45) runs 8.94 miles (14.39 km) in a north–south direction from LA 42 at Colyell to US 190 at Satsuma. It is locally known as South Satsuma Road.

PR 45 is only signed at its interchange with I-12 by La DOTD. The posted speed limit is 45 mph (70 km/h).

The entire highway is in Livingston Parish.

Location	mi	km	Destinations	Notes
Colyell	0.000	0.000	LA 42 – Port Vincent, Springfield	Southern terminus
	6.559– 6.902	10.556– 11.108	I-12 – Baton Rouge, Hammond	Exit 19 on I-12
Satsuma	8.938	14.384	US 190 (Florida Boulevard) – Walker, Livingston	Northern terminus
1.000 mi = 1.609 km; 1.000 km = 0.621 mi

== Natchitoches Parish Road 547 ==
Posey Road
- Location: Natchitoches Parish
- Length: 8.802 mi (14.165 km)

Natchitoches Parish Road 547 (PR 547) runs 8.80 miles (14.16 km) in a general east–west direction from LA 1222 northeast of Robeline to PR 441 (Johnson Chute Road) west of Natchitoches. It is locally known as Posey Road.

PR 547 is only signed with standard markers at its interchange with I-49 by La DOTD. However, its number does appear on local street signs next to its local name.

The entire route is in Natchitoches Parish.

mi	km	Destinations	Notes
0.000	0.000	LA 1222 west	Western terminus of PR 547; eastern terminus of LA 1222
7.986– 8.162	12.852– 13.135	I-49 – Shreveport, Alexandria	Exit 142 on I-49
8.802	14.165	PR 441 (Johnson Chute Road)	Eastern terminus
1.000 mi = 1.609 km; 1.000 km = 0.621 mi

== Natchitoches Parish Road 620 ==
Flora-Natchez Road
- Location: Natchitoches Parish
- Length: 1.993 mi (3.207 km)

Natchitoches Parish Road 620 (PR 620) runs 1.993 miles (3.207 km) in an east–west direction from the I-49 frontage road in Natchitoches to PR 615 (Old River Road) south of Natchez. It is locally known as Flora-Natchez Road.

PR 620 is only signed with standard markers at the junction of LA 478 and Flora-Natchez Road near the former's interchange with I-49. However, its number does appear on local street signs next to its local name.

The western segment of Flora-Natchez Road, including its intersection with LA 478, was relocated by La DOTD in the 1980s to accommodate the I-49 interchange. The resulting 0.37-mile (0.60 km) road segment is state-maintained and internally designated as a frontage road for I-49, the remainder being the parish-maintained PR 620.

The entire highway is in Natchitoches Parish.

Location	mi	km	Destinations	Notes
Natchitoches	0.000	0.000	I-49 Frontage Road	Western terminus
	1.993	3.207	PR 615 (Old River Road)	Eastern terminus
1.000 mi = 1.609 km; 1.000 km = 0.621 mi

== Natchitoches Parish Road 820 ==
Emmanuel Road
- Location: Natchitoches Parish
- Length: 8.112 mi (13.055 km)

Natchitoches Parish Road 820 (PR 820) runs 8.11 miles (13.05 km) in a general northwest to southeast direction from Coco Bed Road in Cloutierville to LA 490 in Chopin. It is locally known as Emmanuel Road.

PR 820 is only signed with standard markers at its junction with LA 490 near an interchange with I-49. However, its number does appear on local street signs next to its local name.

The entire highway is in Natchitoches Parish.

Location	mi	km	Destinations	Notes
Cloutierville	8.112	13.055	Coco Bed Road	Western terminus
Chopin	0.000	0.000	LA 490	Eastern terminus
1.000 mi = 1.609 km; 1.000 km = 0.621 mi

== Natchitoches Parish Road 829 ==
Bayou Derbonne Road
- Location: Natchitoches Parish
- Length: 5.717 mi (9.201 km)

Natchitoches Parish Road 829 (PR 829) runs 5.72 miles (9.21 km) in an east–west direction from the junction of LA 493 and Forest Service Road 339 (FS 339) south of Montrose to LA 119 in Derry. It is locally known as Bayou Derbonne Road.

PR 829 is only signed with standard markers at its junction with LA 119 near an interchange with I-49. However, its number does appear on local street signs next to its local name.

The entire highway is in Natchitoches Parish.

Location	mi	km	Destinations	Notes
	5.717	9.201	LA 493 east Forest Service Road 339 – Red Dirt, Longleaf Vista	Western terminus
Derry	0.000	0.000	LA 119 – Derry, Gorum	Eastern terminus
1.000 mi = 1.609 km; 1.000 km = 0.621 mi

== Ouachita Parish Road 25 ==
Camp Road
- Location: Ouachita Parish
- Length: 2.475 mi (3.983 km)

Ouachita Parish Road 25 (PR 25) runs 2.48 miles (3.99 km) in a general southeast to northwest direction from Cheniere Station Road in Cheniere to US 80 northwest to Cheniere. It is locally known as Camp Road.

PR 25 is only signed at its interchange with I-20 by La DOTD. The posted speed limit is 45 mph (70 km/h).

The entire highway is in Ouachita Parish.

Location	mi	km	Destinations	Notes
Cheniere	2.475	3.983	Cheniere Station Road	Southern terminus
	1.111– 0.720	1.788– 1.159	I-20 – Monroe, Shreveport	Exit 107 on I-20
	0.000	0.000	US 80 (Cypress Street) – West Monroe, Calhoun	Northern terminus
1.000 mi = 1.609 km; 1.000 km = 0.621 mi

== Rapides Parish Road 22 ==
Robinson Bridge Road
- Location: Rapides Parish
- Length: 1.995 mi (3.211 km)

Rapides Parish Road 22 (PR 22) runs 2.00 miles (3.22 km) in an east–west direction from the junction of I-49 and LA 3265 in Woodworth to LA 470 east of Woodworth.

PR 22 is only signed at its interchange with I-49 by La DOTD. The posted speed limit is 45 mph (70 km/h).

The entire highway is in Rapides Parish.

Location	mi	km	Destinations	Notes
Woodworth	1.995	3.211	I-49 – Alexandria, Opelousas LA 3265 west (Robinson Bridge Road) – Woodworth	Western terminus of PR 22; eastern terminus of LA 3265; exit 73 on I-49
	0.000	0.000	LA 470	Eastern terminus
1.000 mi = 1.609 km; 1.000 km = 0.621 mi

== Rapides Parish Road 23 ==
Rapides Station Road
- Location: Rapides Parish
- Length: 4.097 mi (6.593 km)

Rapides Parish Road 23 (PR 23) runs 4.10 miles (6.60 km) in a north–south direction from North Bayou Rapides Road south of Rapides to a dead end north of Rapides. It is locally known as Rapides Station Road south of Old Boyce Road and as River Road northward.

PR 23 is only signed at its interchange with I-49 by La DOTD. The posted speed limit is 45 mph (70 km/h).

The entire highway is in Rapides Parish.

Location	mi	km	Destinations	Notes
	0.000	0.000	North Bayou Rapides Road	Southern terminus
Boyce	2.443	3.932	LA 1 – Boyce, Alexandria	
Boyce	2.499– 2.676	4.022– 4.307	I-49 – Alexandria, Shreveport	Exit 94 on I-49; location also known as Rapides
	4.097	6.593	Dead end	Northern terminus
1.000 mi = 1.609 km; 1.000 km = 0.621 mi

== Richland Parish Road 202 ==
McManus Road
- Location: Richland Parish
- Length: 3.134 mi (5.044 km)

Richland Parish Road 202 (PR 202) runs 3.13 miles (5.04 km) in a general southwest to northeast direction from the intersection of Pony Greer Road and Mengel Road southwest of Holly Ridge to the junction of I-20 and LA 183 at Holly Ridge. It is locally known as McManus Road.

PR 202 is only signed at its interchange with I-20 by La DOTD.

The entire highway is in Richland Parish.

Location	mi	km	Destinations	Notes
	0.000	0.000	Pony Greer Road, Mengel Road	Southwestern terminus
Holly Ridge	3.134	5.044	I-20 – Monroe, Vicksburg LA 183 north – Holly Ridge	Northeastern terminus of PR 202; southern terminus of LA 183; exit 145 on I-20
1.000 mi = 1.609 km; 1.000 km = 0.621 mi

== Webster Parish Road 117 ==
Goodwill Road
- Location: Webster Parish
- Length: 5.773 mi (9.291 km)

Webster Parish Road 117 (PR 117) runs 5.77 miles (9.29 km) in a north–south direction from Freight Entrance Road at Camp Minden to Fuller Road north of Camp Minden. It is locally known as Goodwill Road.

PR 117 is signed by La DOTD at its interchange with I-20 but only on the secondary exit ramp signage. The route is also signed in a few locations by the Webster Parish Police Jury.

The entire route is in Webster Parish.

mi	km	Destinations	Notes
0.000	0.000	Freight Entrance Road	Southern terminus; to Camp Minden
0.077– 0.089	0.124– 0.143	US 79 / US 80 – Minden, Shreveport	
0.388– 0.597	0.624– 0.961	I-20 – Shreveport, Monroe	Exit 38 on I-20
3.843	6.185	LA 528 (Bellvue Road) – Dixie Inn, Bellvue	
5.773	9.291	PR 10 (Fuller Road)	Northern terminus
1.000 mi = 1.609 km; 1.000 km = 0.621 mi

== Gallery ==
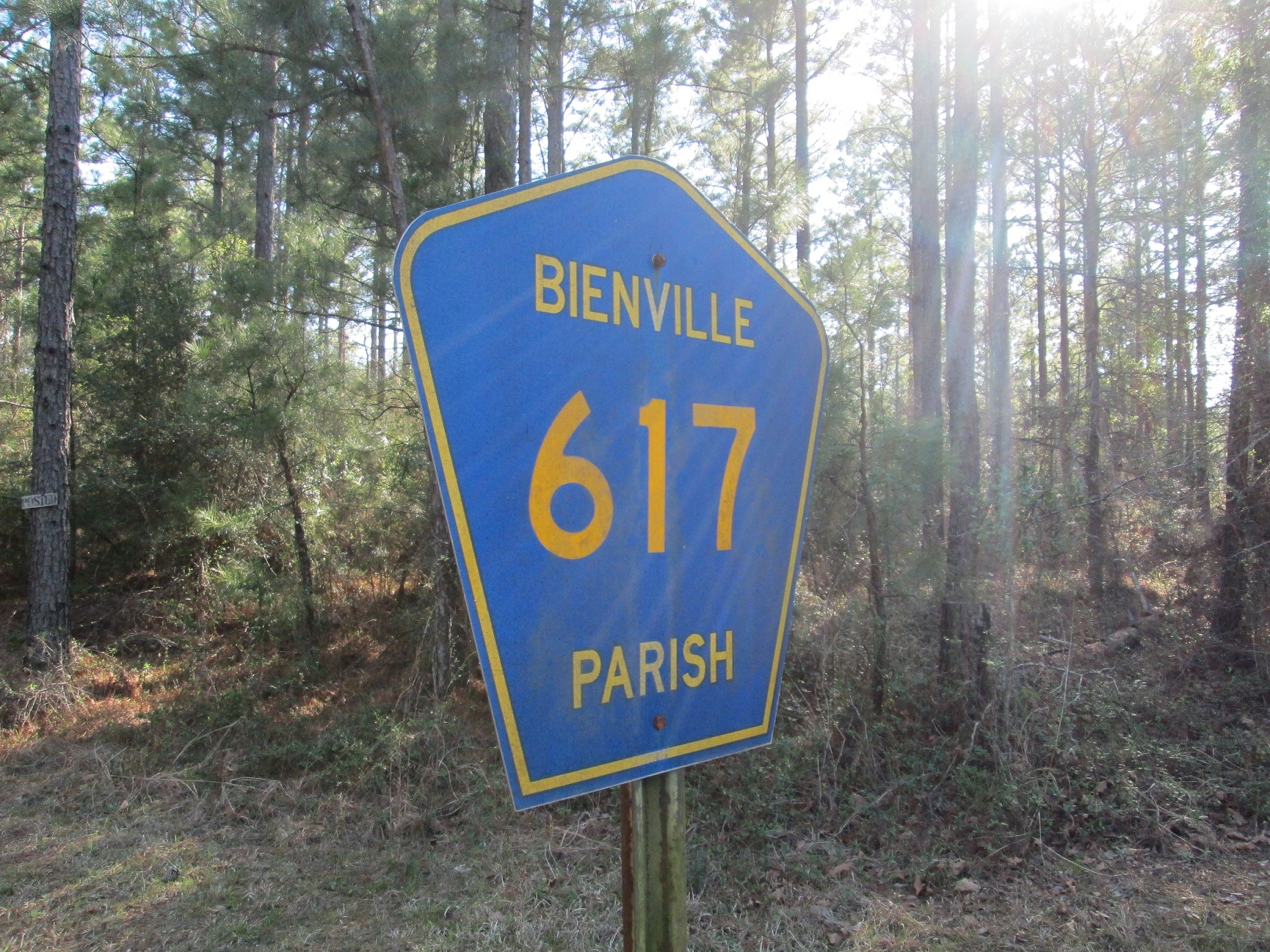
Marker for Bienville Parish Road 617

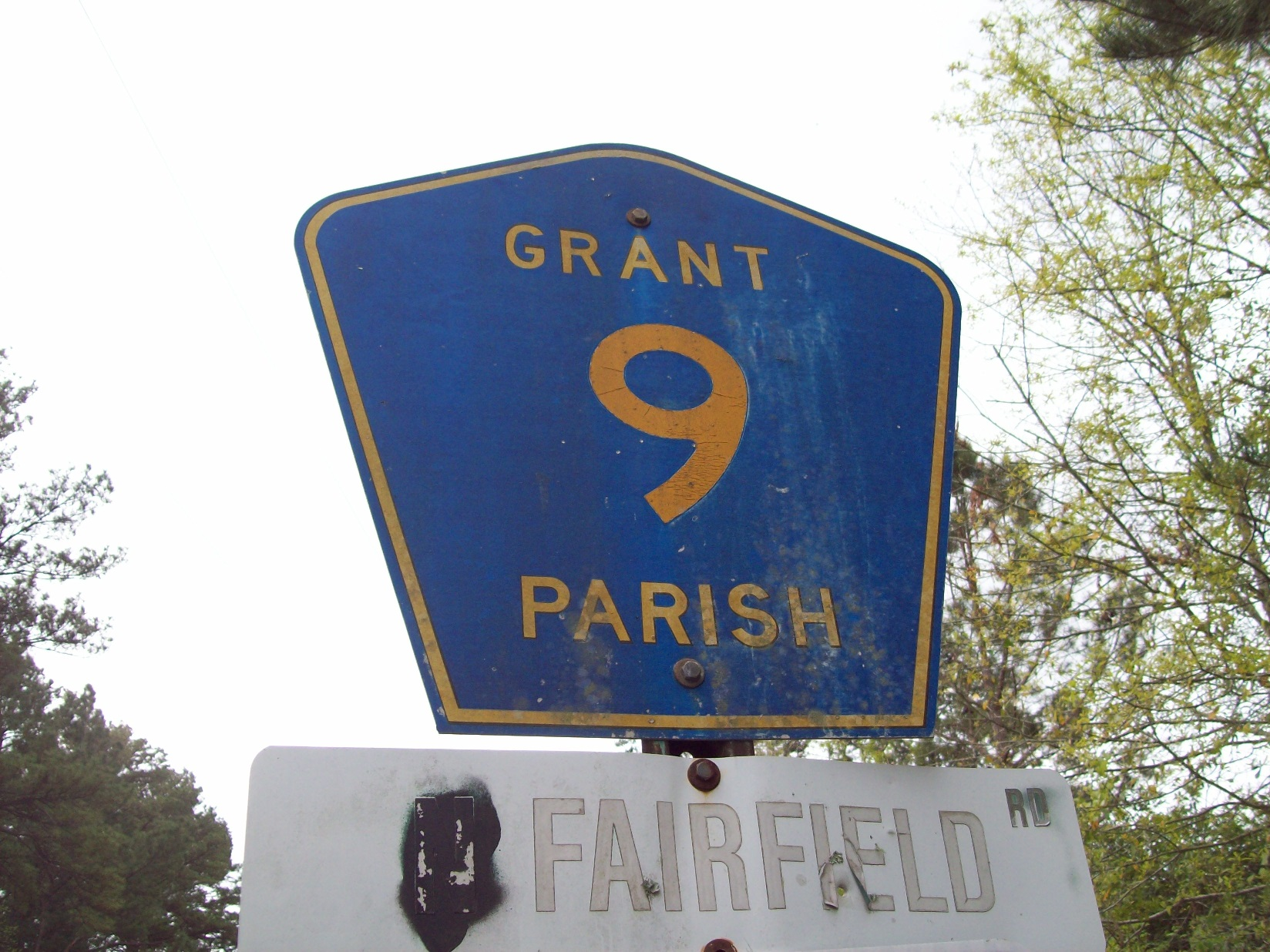
Marker for Grant Parish Road 9 along LA 122

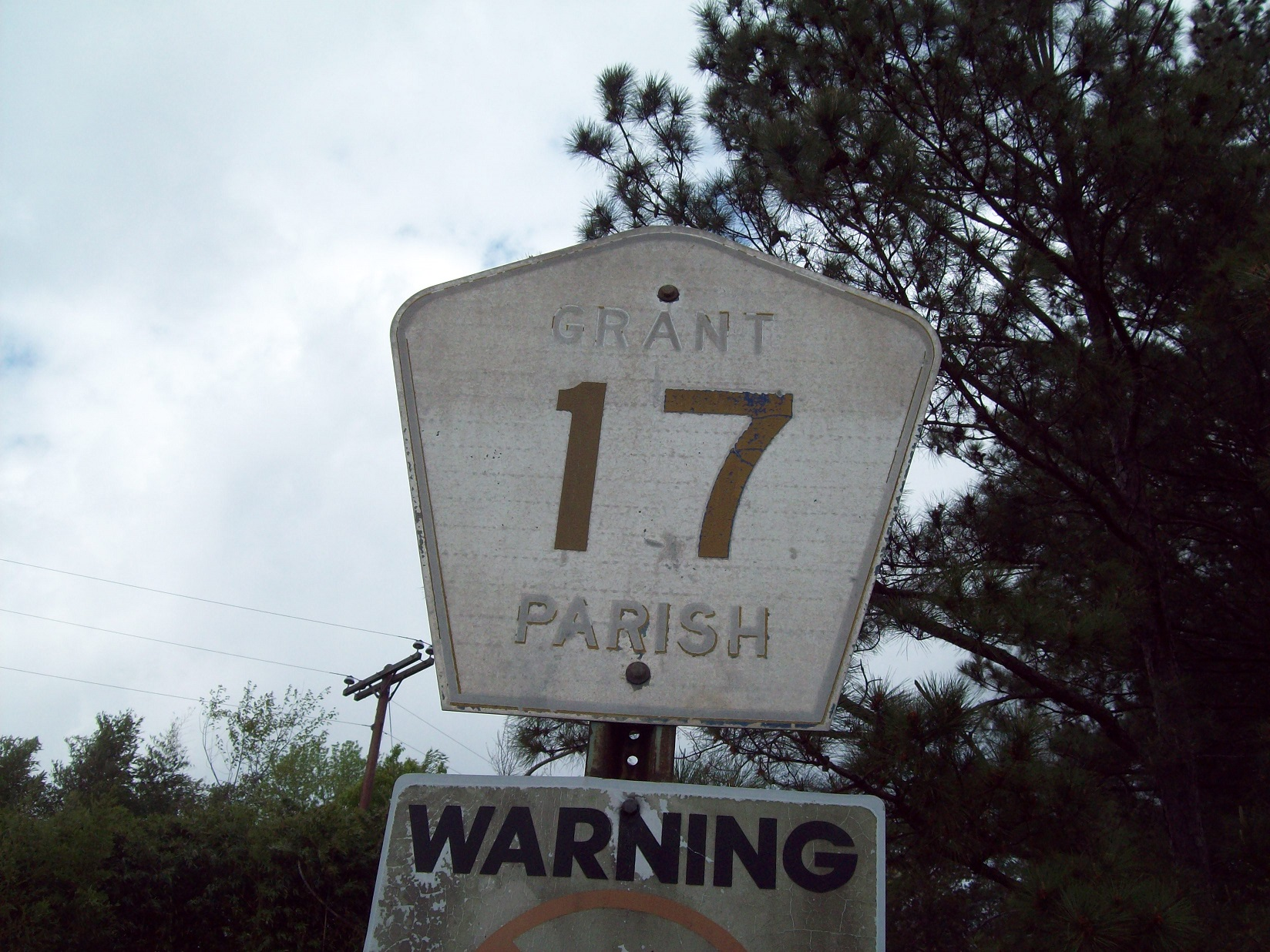
Badly faded parish-installed marker for Grant Parish Road 17, off of LA 8

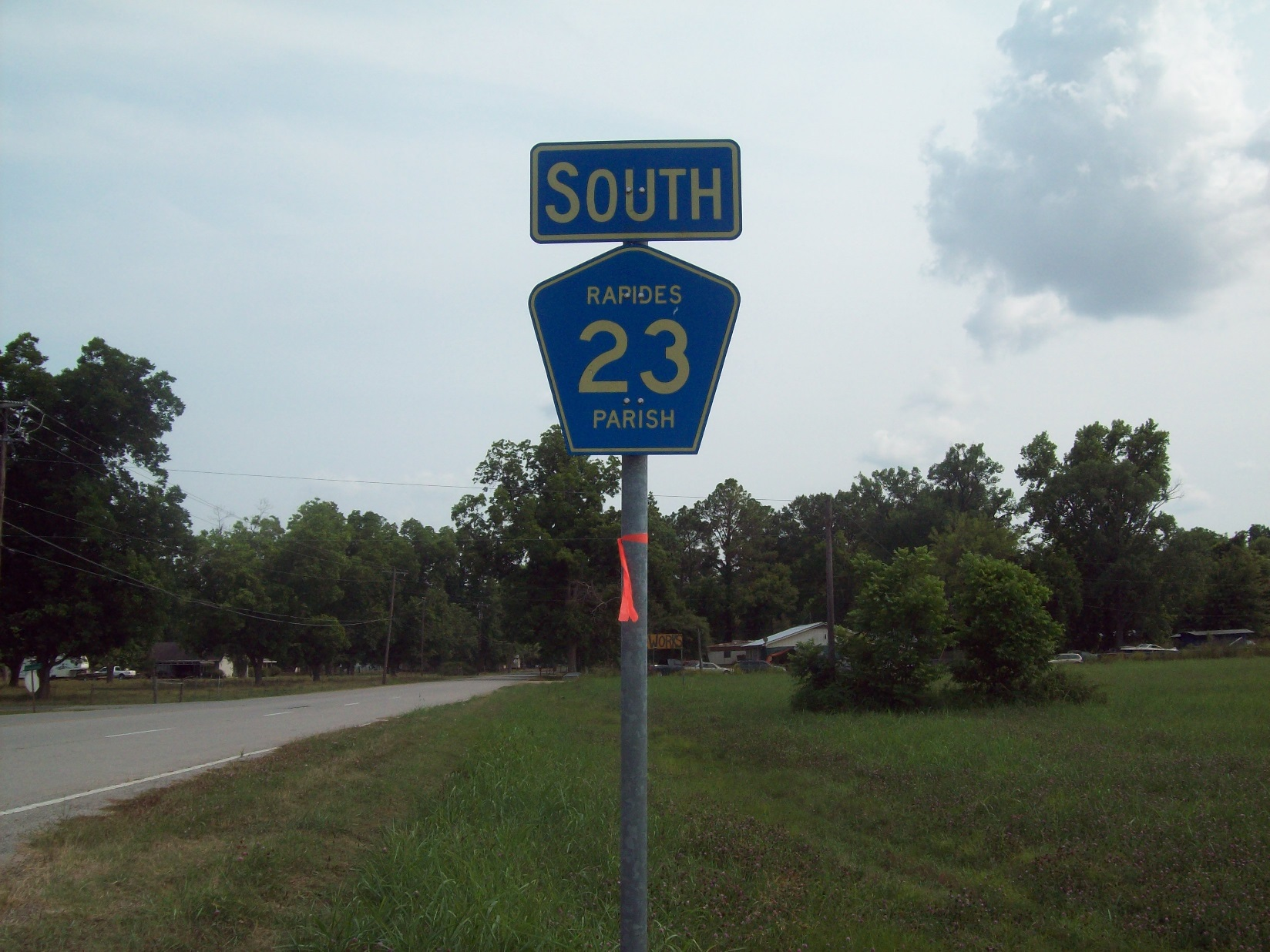
State-installed marker for Rapides Parish Road 23, on the exit from I-49

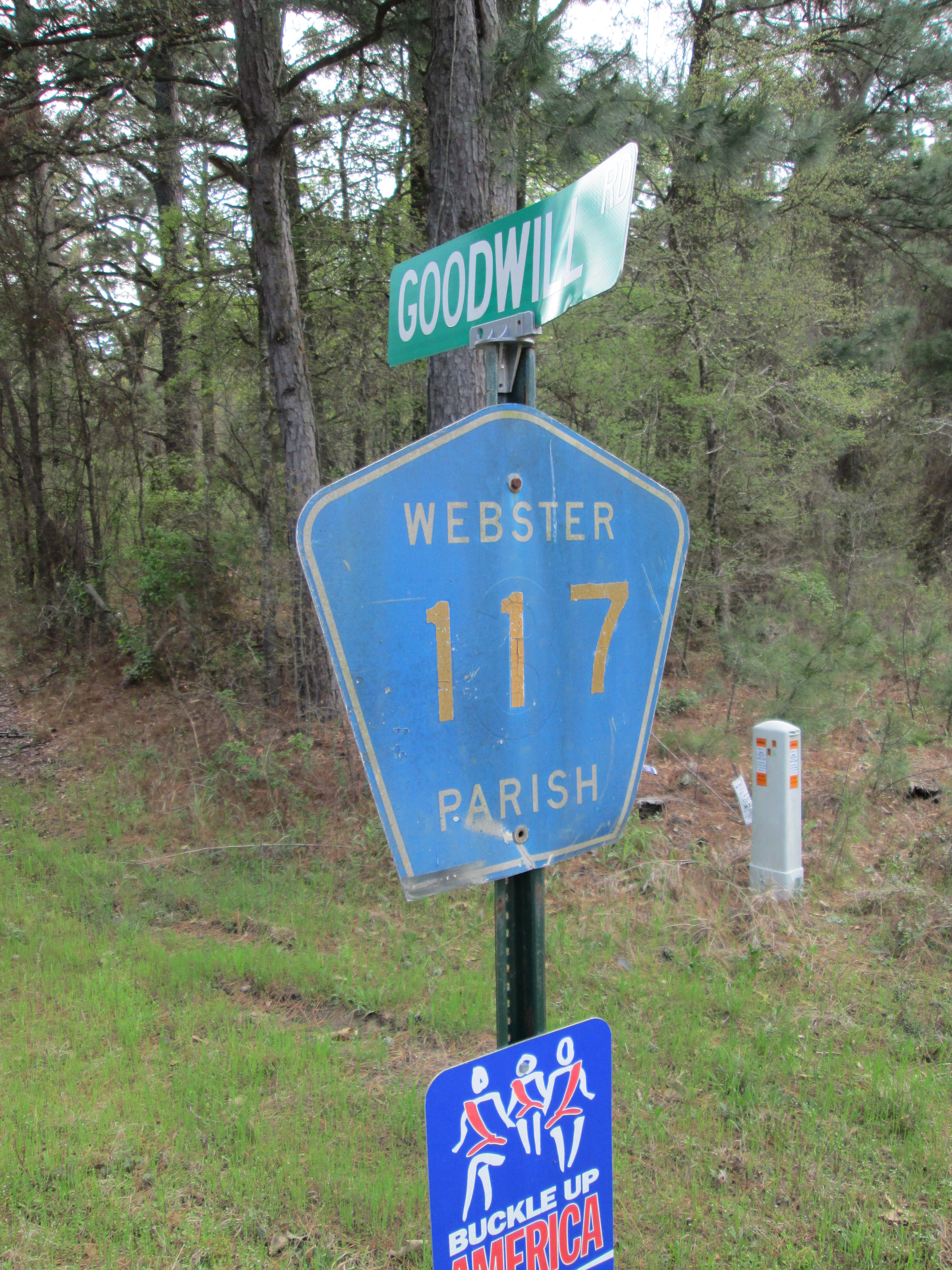
Marker for Webster Parish Road 117

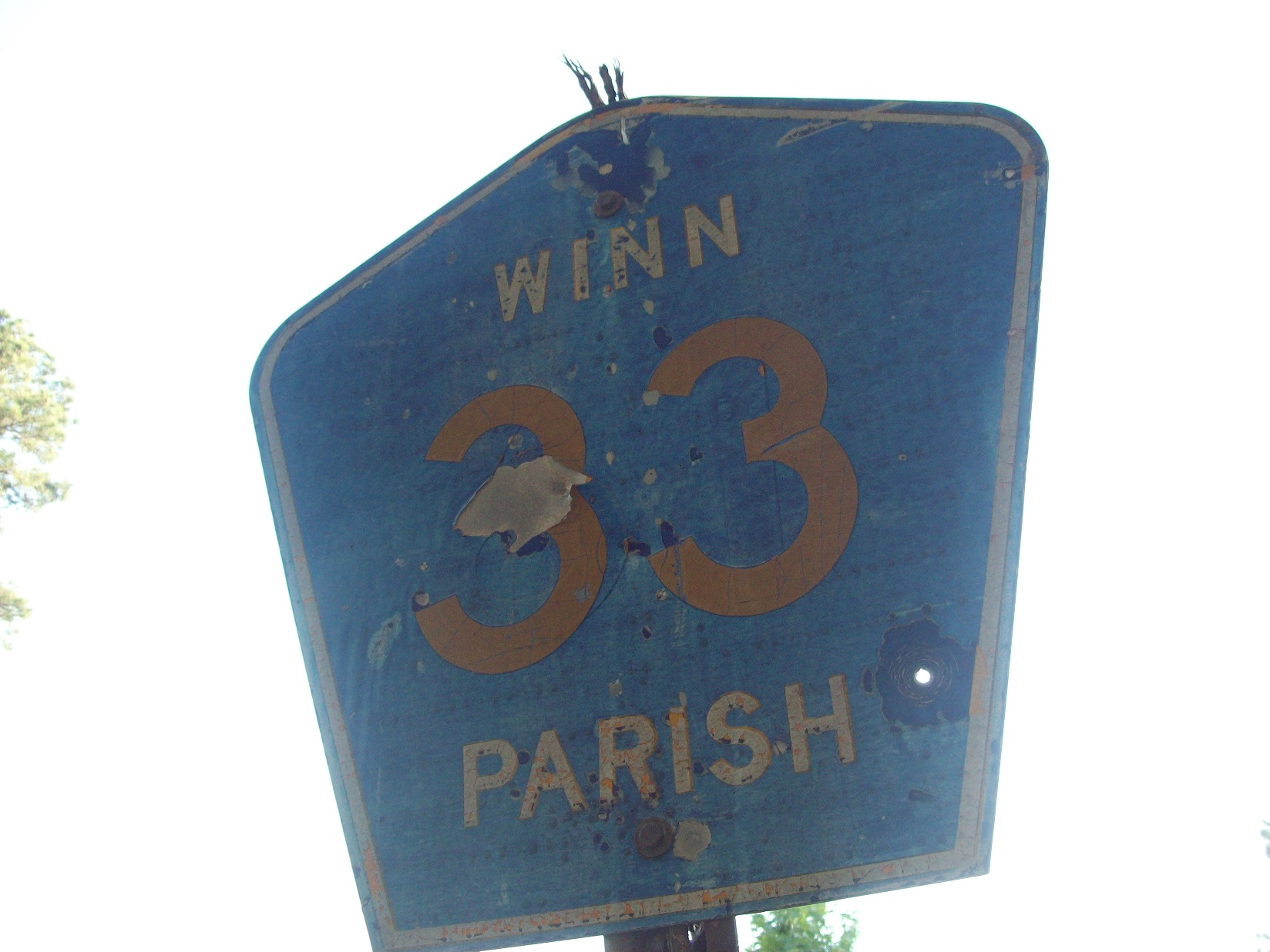
Marker for Winn Parish Road 33, off of LA 1230

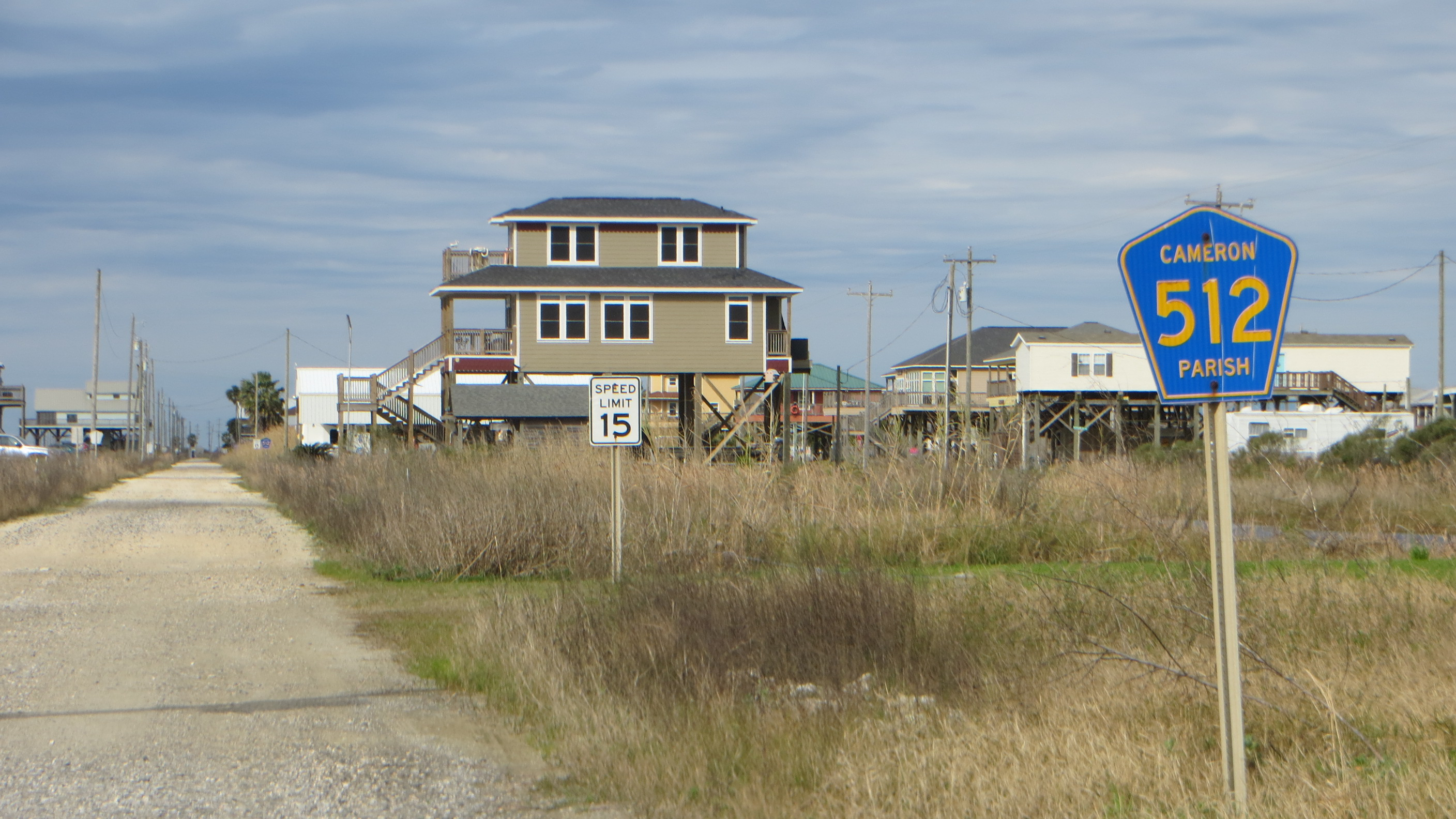
Marker for Cameron Parish Road 512 in Holly Beach. Parish road markers are very common in Cameron Parish.
