= Louisiana Highway 8 =

State highway in Louisiana, United States

Louisiana Highway 8

Route information
- Maintained by Louisiana DOTD
- Length: 155.9 mi (250.9 km)
- Existed: 1955 renumbering–present

Major junctions
- West end: SH 63 near Burr Ferry
- US 171 in Leesville; LA 28 east of Leesville; I-49 near Boyce; US 71 in Colfax; US 167 south of Dry Prong; US 165 in Pollock; US 84 in Jena
- East end: US 425 / LA 15 in Sicily Island

Location
- Country: United States
- State: Louisiana
- Parishes: Vernon, Rapides, Grant, La Salle, Catahoula

Highway system
- Louisiana State Highway System; Interstate; US; State; Scenic
← LA 7	→ LA 9

Louisiana Highway 8 (LA 8) is a state highway in Louisiana. It spans 156 miles (251 km) beginning at the Louisiana/Texas state line west of Leesville and ending at an intersection with U.S. Route 425 and LA 15 in Sicily Island.

== Route description ==
From the west (Texas) State Highway 63 becomes LA 8 after crossing the Sabine River near Burr Ferry. At the Burr's Ferry Bridge in Vernon Parish, LA 8 heads east, and merges with U.S. Highway 171 north in Leesville. In Leesville, U.S. 171/LA 8 continues north as a four lane, divided road through town. LA 8 breaks off from U.S. 171 at the northern city limits and joins and runs concurrent with LA 28 east, and continues northeastward as a four lane divided Highway. LA 28/LA 8 intersects with LA 468 (The old Slagle road) south just before LA 8 splits and heads northeast as a two lane road, Intersecting with LA 469, passing through Slagle, intersecting LA 121, the LA 465, and passing north of Simpson, before exiting Vernon Parish and entering northwestern Rapides Parish.

In Rapides Parish, LA 8 continues northeastward, passing north of Lake Rodemacher, and merges with I-49 for approximately a mile. LA 8 then splits from I-49 after approximately a mile and passes through Boyce and heads due north, crossing the Red River into Grant Parish. At Colfax, LA 8 turns eastward and intersects U.S. Highway 71, US 167, and US 165 in Pollock. LA 8 then turns northeastward and enters La Salle Parish.

In Jena, LA 8 merges with US 84 and turns to the southeast. After approximately 6 miles (9.7 km), LA 8 splits with US 84 and continues eastward into Catahoula Parish. In Catahoula Parish, LA 8 passes through Harrisonburg and Sicily Island, where it ends at an intersection with US 425 and LA 15.

== History ==
In the original Louisiana Highway system in use between 1921 and 1955, LA 8 was part of several shorter routes, including: State Route 21 from the Texas state line to Slagle; Route 107 to Boyce; Route 144 to Colfax; Route 19 to Harrisonburg; and Route 18 to Sicily Island. All were designated by various acts of the state legislature between 1921 and 1926. The routes were joined together under the single designation of LA 8 when the Louisiana Department of Highways renumbered the state highway system in 1955, creating one of several east–west cross-state routes.

== Future ==
The segment of LA 8 between the Texas state line and Leesville is part of the High Priority Corridor 99 (Central Louisiana Corridor). Along this corridor, LA 8 will be upgraded to interstate standards at the Sabine River Bridge before either paralleling or being upgraded to I-14. A timeline for this has not been determined.

== Major junctions ==
County	Location	mi	km	Exit	Destinations	Notes
Vernon		0.0	0.0		SH 63 west – Burkeville, Jasper	Burr's Ferry Bridge over the Sabine River; Texas state line
Vernon	Burr Ferry	1.4	2.3		LA 111 south – Evans	Western end of LA 111 concurrency
Vernon	Burr Ferry	2.0	3.2		LA 111 north – South Toledo Bend State Park	Eastern end of LA 111 concurrency
Vernon	Caney	9.3	15.0		LA 464 south	Northern terminus of LA 464
Vernon	Leesville	18.4	29.6		US 171 south (South 6th Street) – Fort Johnson, Lake Charles	One-way pair; western end of LA 8 westbound / US 171 southbound concurrency
Vernon	Leesville	18.4	29.6		US 171 (North 5th Street) / East Texas Street	One-way pair; western end of LA 8 eastbound / US 171 northbound concurrency
Vernon	Leesville	19.2	30.9		LA 1213 north (Kurthwood Road)	Southern terminus of LA 1213; no direct access from westbound LA 8
Vernon	Leesville	19.7	31.7		US 171 north / LA 28 begins – Shreveport	Roundabout; eastern end of US 171 concurrency; western end of LA 28 concurrency
Vernon	Leesville	20.0	32.2		LA 1213 south (Kurthwood Road) / LA 117 north – Kurthwood, Hagewood	Northern terminus of LA 1213, southern terminus of LA 117; no access from LA 1213 north to LA 8 west and LA 117 south to LA 8 east
Vernon		23.9	38.5		LA 184 west – Fort Johnson	Eastern terminus of LA 184
Vernon		24.9	40.1		LA 468 west	Eastern terminus of LA 468
Vernon		25.2	40.6		LA 28 east (Alexandria Highway)	Eastern end of LA 28 concurrency
Vernon		26.3	42.3		LA 469 south	Northern terminus of LA 469
Vernon	Slagle	29.8	48.0		LA 121 east	Western terminus of LA 121
Vernon	Simpson	37.1	59.7		LA 465 west	Western end of LA 465 concurrency
Vernon	Simpson	38.1	61.3		LA 465 east – Sieper	Eastern end of LA 465 concurrency
Rapides	Flatwoods	51.9	83.5		LA 119 north – Gorum, Derry	Southern terminus of LA 119
Rapides	Zimmerman	61.6	99.1	103	I-49 north to LA 1 – Shreveport	Western end of I-49 concurrency
Rapides		65.1	104.8	99	I-49 south / LA 1200 south – Alexandria	Eastern end of I-49 concurrency; western end of LA 1200 concurrency
Rapides		65.4	105.3		LA 1200 north to LA 1 – Boyce	Western end of LA 1200 concurrency
Grant		73.1	117.6		LA 492 east	Western terminus of LA 492
Grant	Colfax	76.6	123.3		LA 158 north (Eighth Street)	Southern terminus of LA 158
Grant		78.6	126.5		LA 3169 east	
Grant		78.9	127.0		US 71 north – Montgomery, Shreveport	Western end of US 71 concurrency
Grant		79.7	128.3		US 71 south / LA 3169 west – Alexandria	Eastern end of US 71 concurrency; eastern terminus of LA 3169
Grant		83.5	134.4		LA 123 east – Dry Prong	Western terminus of LA 123
Grant	Bentley	91.0	146.5		US 167 – Winnfield, Alexandria	
Grant	Pollock	96.3	155.0		US 165 north (Ridge Street) / Hill Street	Western end of US 165 concurrency
Grant	Pollock	96.9	155.9		US 165 south / Wills Road	Eastern end of US 165 concurrency
Grant		97.5	156.9		LA 366 west / Pollock Cemetery Road	Eastern terminus of LA 366
La Salle		113.5	182.7		LA 774 east / Snyder Road	Western terminus of LA 774
La Salle		115.4	185.7		LA 772 east	Western terminus of LA 772
La Salle		116.1	186.8		LA 773 south	Northern terminus of LA 773
La Salle	Midway	117.5	189.1		LA 3104 north / Hatcher Road	Southern terminus of LA 3104
La Salle	Jena	118.8	191.2		LA 127 south (South First Street)	Western end of LA 127 concurrency
La Salle	Jena	119.0	191.5		US 84 west / LA 772 west (West Oak Street) / LA 127 north (North First Street)	Eastern end of LA 127 concurrency; western end of US 84 / LA 772 concurrencies
La Salle	Jena	119.9	193.0		LA 459 north (Aimwell Road) – Aimwell	Southern terminus of LA 459
La Salle	Jena	120.0	193.1		LA 772 east	Eastern end of LA 772 concurrency
La Salle	Whitehall	126.2	203.1		US 84 east / LA 460 west – Jonesville, Natchez	Western end of US 84 concurrency; eastern terminus of LA 460
Catahoula		135.4	217.9		LA 126 west	Western end of LA 126 concurrency
Catahoula		136.0	218.9		LA 126 east	Eastern end of LA 126 concurrency
Catahoula	Harrisonburg	143.8	231.4		LA 124 east – Jonesville	Western end of LA 124 concurrency
Catahoula	Harrisonburg	144.2	232.1		LA 124 west (Bushley Street)	Eastern end of LA 124 concurrency
Catahoula		144.9	233.2		LA 922	
Catahoula	Leland	152.1	244.8		LA 913 north	Southern terminus of LA 913
Catahoula		153.9	247.7		LA 914 west	Eastern terminus of LA 914
Catahoula		154.8	249.1		LA 916 north	Southern terminus of LA 916
Catahoula	Sicily Island	155.5	250.3		LA 1017 south (Woodward Lane)	Northern terminus of LA 1017
Catahoula	Sicily Island	155.9	250.9		US 425 south / LA 15 south (Chisum Street)	One-way pair
Catahoula	Sicily Island	155.9	250.9		US 425 north / LA 15 north (Chisum Street)	One-way pair
1.000 mi = 1.609 km; 1.000 km = 0.621 mi: Concurrency terminus; Incomplete access

== Spur route ==
Louisiana Highway 8 Spur
- Location: Flatwoods
- Length: 0.18 mi (290 m)

Louisiana Highway 8 Spur (LA 8 Spur) is a 0.18-mile (0.29 km) highway in Flatwoods, Louisiana. It runs from west to east. LA 8 Spur follows the original routing from I-49 to LA 1, connecting the two highways. It is unsigned for its entire route. It was created in 2002, to give numbering to the short section between LA 1 and I-49.

The entire highway is in Flatwoods, Rapides Parish.

mi	km	Destinations	Notes
0.00	0.00	I-49 / LA 8	
0.18	0.29	LA 1	
1.000 mi = 1.609 km; 1.000 km = 0.621 mi
