= List of state highways in Louisiana (100–149) =

The following is a list of state highways in the U.S. state of Louisiana designated in the 100–149 range.

== Louisiana Highway 100 ==
Louisiana Highway 100
- Location: Evangeline–Crowley
- Length: 14.831 mi (23.868 km)
- Existed: 1955–present

Louisiana Highway 100 (LA 100) runs 14.83 miles (23.87 km) in an east–west direction from LA 97 in Evangeline to LA 13 in Crowley, Acadia Parish.

== Louisiana Highway 101 ==
Louisiana Highway 101
- Location: Hayes–Iowa
- Length: 17.278 mi (27.806 km)
- Existed: 1955–present

Louisiana Highway 101 (LA 101) runs 17.28 miles (27.81 km) in a general north–south direction from LA 14 in Hayes, Calcasieu Parish to LA 383 north of Iowa in Jefferson Davis Parish.

== Louisiana Highway 102 ==
Louisiana Highway 102
- Location: Fenton–Lake Arthur
- Length: 35.367 mi (56.918 km)
- Existed: 1955–present

Louisiana Highway 102 (LA 102) runs 35.37 miles (56.92 km) in a northwest to southeast direction from US 165 in Fenton to LA 26 north of Lake Arthur, Jefferson Davis Parish.

== Louisiana Highway 103 ==
Louisiana Highway 103
- Location: Lawtell–Leonville
- Length: 39.388 mi (63.389 km)
- Existed: 1955–present

Louisiana Highway 103 (LA 103) runs 39.39 miles (63.39 km) in a wide semi-circle around the north side of Opelousas, extending from US 190 west of Lawtell to LA 31 in Leonville, St. Landry Parish.

== Louisiana Highway 104 ==
Louisiana Highway 104
- Location: Soileau–Opelousas
- Length: 41.374 mi (66.585 km)
- Existed: 1955–present

Louisiana Highway 104 (LA 104) runs 41.37 miles (66.58 km) in an east–west direction from LA 26 southeast of Oberlin, Allen Parish to US 190 in Opelousas, St. Landry Parish.

== Louisiana Highway 105 ==
Louisiana Highway 105
- Location: Krotz Springs–Simmesport
- Length: 38.577 mi (62.084 km)
- Existed: 1955–present

Louisiana Highway 105 (LA 105) runs 38.58 miles (62.09 km) in a north–south direction from a local road south of Krotz Springs, St. Landry Parish to a junction with LA 1 in Simmesport, Avoyelles Parish.

The route heads north along the west bank levee of the Atchafalaya River into Krotz Springs, where it crosses the Union Pacific Railroad (UP) line at Main Street. LA 105 then passes underneath the twin spans of the US 190 Atchafalaya River bridge between Baton Rouge and Opelousas. LA 105 proceeds north along the river for 10.9 miles (17.5 km) to the town of Melville, where it makes a zigzag via LA 10 (LaFleur Street) next to the defunct Melville Ferry landing. Continuing north from Melville, LA 105 passes through Bayou Current and intersects LA 360. It then crosses from St. Landry Parish into Avoyelles Parish and continues 10.4 miles (16.7 km) further to its terminus at LA 1 at the foot of the Atchafalaya River bridge in Simmesport.

Parish	Location	mi	km	Destinations	Notes
St. Landry		0.000	0.000	Begin state maintenance on West Atchafalaya Levee Road	Southern terminus
St. Landry	Krotz Springs	3.049	4.907	LA 3173 (Second Street)	Eastern terminus of LA 3173
St. Landry	Krotz Springs	3.656	5.884	LA 3178 (Florida Street)	Eastern terminus of LA 3178
St. Landry	Krotz Springs	3.763– 3.886	6.056– 6.254	US 190 – Krotz Springs, Baton Rouge	Interchange
St. Landry	Melville	14.740	23.722	LA 10 west (LaFleur Street) – Palmetto	South end of LA 10 concurrency
St. Landry	Melville	14.990	24.124	LA 10 east (LaFleur Street)	North end of LA 10 concurrency
St. Landry	Bayou Current	23.940	38.528	LA 360 – Palmetto	Eastern terminus of LA 360
Avoyelles	Odenburg	34.171	54.993	LA 1183	Southern terminus of LA 1183
Avoyelles	Simmesport	38.543– 38.577	62.029– 62.084	LA 1 – Marksville, Alexandria, Baton Rouge	Northern terminus
1.000 mi = 1.609 km; 1.000 km = 0.621 mi: Concurrency terminus

== Louisiana Highway 106 ==
Louisiana Highway 106
- Location: Beaver–Milburn
- Length: 24.202 mi (38.949 km)
- Existed: 1955–present

Louisiana Highway 106 (LA 106) runs 24.20 miles (38.95 km) in an east–west direction from LA 10 east of Oakdale in Evangeline Parish to LA 29 south of Bunkie, Avoyelles Parish.

== Louisiana Highway 107 ==
Louisiana Highway 107
- Location: Morrow–Pineville
- Length: 64.957 mi (104.538 km)
- Existed: 1955–present

Louisiana Highway 107 (LA 107) runs 64.96 miles (104.54 km) in a north–south direction from US 71 in Morrow, St. Landry Parish to the concurrent US 167/LA 28 in Pineville, Rapides Parish.

== Louisiana Highway 108 ==
Louisiana Highway 108
- Location: Vinton–Sulphur
- Length: 24.866 mi (40.018 km)
- Existed: 1955–present

Louisiana Highway 108 (LA 108) runs 24.87 miles (40.02 km) in a general east–west direction from I-10 in Vinton to US 90 in Sulphur, Calcasieu Parish.

== Louisiana Highway 109 ==
Louisiana Highway 109
- Location: Toomey–Juanita
- Length: 39.931 mi (64.263 km)
- Existed: 1955–present

Louisiana Highway 109 (LA 109) runs 39.93 miles (64.26 km) in a north–south direction from the junction of US 90 and LA 3112 southwest of Vinton, Calcasieu Parish to LA 27 at Juanita, Beauregard Parish.

== Louisiana Highway 110 ==
Louisiana Highway 110
- Location: Merryville–Longville
- Length: 25.154 mi (40.481 km)
- Existed: 1955–present

Louisiana Highway 110 (LA 110) runs 25.15 miles (40.48 km) in a northwest to southeast direction from US 190 in Merryville to the concurrent US 171/US 190 in Longville, Beauregard Parish.

LA 110 initially heads from US 190 and travels through the town of Merryville. After passing the local high school, the route turns to the southeast and travels 9.6 miles (15.4 km) to a junction with LA 27 at Singer. Here, LA 110 turns south onto LA 27 for a short distance before resuming its southeastward course. Over the next few miles, the highway curves east and south along rural section line roads before heading due east for 6.8 miles (10.9 km). LA 110 curves slightly along the south of Longville Lake before reaching its eastern terminus at US 171/US 190 in Longville.

The entire highway is in Beauregard Parish.

Location	mi	km	Destinations	Notes
Merryville	0.0	0.0	US 190 – DeRidder, Jasper	Western terminus
Singer	11.6	18.7	LA 27 north – DeRidder	West end of LA 27 concurrency
Singer	11.7	18.8	LA 27 – DeQuincy	East end of LA 27 concurrency
Longville	25.1	40.4	US 171 / US 190 – Lake Charles, DeRidder	Eastern terminus
1.000 mi = 1.609 km; 1.000 km = 0.621 mi: Concurrency terminus

== Louisiana Highway 111 ==
Louisiana Highway 111
- Location: Junction–Anacoco
- Length: 45.722 mi (73.582 km)
- Existed: 1955–present

Louisiana Highway 111 (LA 111) runs 45.72 miles (73.58 km) in a general north–south direction from US 190 in Junction, Beauregard Parish to LA 117 northeast of Leesville, Vernon Parish.

== Louisiana Highway 112 ==
Louisiana Highway 112
- Location: DeRidder–Lecompte
- Length: 80.899 mi (130.194 km)
- Existed: 1955–present

Louisiana Highway 112 (LA 112) runs 80.90 miles (130.20 km) in a general east–west direction from the concurrent US 171/US 190 east of DeRidder, Beauregard Parish to the concurrent US 71/US 167 in Lecompte, Rapides Parish.

== Louisiana Highway 113 ==
Louisiana Highway 113
- Location: Reeves–Glenmora
- Length: 54.492 mi (87.696 km)
- Existed: 1955–present

Louisiana Highway 113 (LA 113) runs 54.49 miles (87.69 km) in a southwest to northeast direction from US 190 in Reeves, Allen Parish to the junction of US 165 and LA 497 in Glenmora, Rapides Parish.

The route heads north from US 190 and crosses from Allen Parish into Beauregard Parish after 5.5 miles (8.9 km). At Dry Creek, a junction with LA 394 provides access to the recreational area around Bundick Lake. LA 113 then intersects LA 26, connecting with DeRidder and Oberlin. Soon after crossing LA 112 at Sugartown, LA 113 bends to the northeast and enters Vernon Parish. Reaching the community of Pitkin, LA 113 turns east to follow LA 10 briefly before branching off into Rapides Parish. At Union Hill, the highway crosses LA 112 once again and proceeds eastward through the southern edge of the Kisatchie National Forest. Near the end of its route, LA 113 zigzags to the south and east into the town of Glenmora, terminating at US 165 between Oakdale and Alexandria.

Parish	Location	mi	km	Destinations	Notes
Allen	Reeves	0.000	0.000	US 190 – Kinder, DeQuincy	Southern terminus
Beauregard	Dry Creek	10.557	16.990	LA 394 – Bundick Lake	Eastern terminus of LA 394
Beauregard		12.889	20.743	LA 1147	Southern terminus of LA 1147
Beauregard		17.826	28.688	LA 26 – DeRidder, Oberlin	
Beauregard	Sugartown	22.578– 22.611	36.336– 36.389	LA 112 – DeRidder, Elizabeth	
Vernon	Pitkin	30.958	49.822	LA 10 west (Pitkin Highway) LA 458 west (Fullerton Blacktop Road)	South end of LA 10 concurrency; eastern terminus of LA 458
Vernon	Pitkin	31.026	49.932	LA 463 north	Southern terminus of LA 463
Vernon		32.717	52.653	LA 10 east (Pitkin Highway) – Elizabeth, Oakdale	North end of LA 10 concurrency
Rapides		39.491	63.555	LA 462	Western terminus of LA 462
Rapides	Union Hill	44.670	71.889	LA 112 – Elizabeth, Hineston	
Rapides	Glenmora	54.492	87.696	US 165 – Oakdale, Alexandria; LA 497 (7th Avenue)	Northern terminus of LA 113; southern terminus of LA 497
1.000 mi = 1.609 km; 1.000 km = 0.621 mi: Concurrency terminus

== Louisiana Highway 114 ==
Louisiana Highway 114
- Location: Avoyelles Parish
- Length: 20.86 mi (33.57 km)
- Existed: 1955–present

Louisiana Highway 114 (LA 114) runs 20.86 miles (33.57 km) from LA 1 in Echo to LA 1/LA 451 east of Moreauville. LA 114 was portions of SR 30, SR 72 and SR 299 before 1955.

== Louisiana Highway 115 ==
Louisiana Highway 115
- Location: St. Landry–Catahoula Lake
- Length: 60.70 mi (97.69 km)
- Existed: 1955–present

Louisiana Highway 115 (LA 115) runs 60.70 miles (97.69 km) in a general north–south direction from LA 106 west of St. Landry, Evangeline Parish to LA 28 north of Deville, Rapides Parish.

Parish	Location	mi	km	Destinations	Notes
Evangeline		0.0	0.0	LA 106 – St. Landry, Bayou Chicot	
Evangeline		10.5	16.9	LA 181 north	
Avoyelles		12.9	20.8	I-49 – Alexandria, Opelousas	I-49 exit 53
Avoyelles		14.0	22.5	LA 1176 east	
Avoyelles	Bunkie	18.7	30.1	US 71 / LA 29 south	South end of LA 29 concurrency
Avoyelles		21.0	33.8	LA 29 north	North end of LA 29 concurrency
Avoyelles		27.5	44.3	LA 1188 north	
Avoyelles	Hessmer	29.7	47.8	LA 114 east – Mansura	South end of LA 114 concurrency
Avoyelles	Hessmer	30.0	48.3	LA 114 west	North end of LA 114 concurrency
Avoyelles	Marksville	35.9	57.8	LA 1 / LA 107 begins	South end of LA 107 concurrency
Avoyelles		38.7	62.3	LA 1191 south	
Avoyelles		39.3	63.2	LA 1192 west	
Avoyelles		42.4	68.2	LA 453 south	
Avoyelles	Effie	45.0	72.4	LA 454 west	
Avoyelles		46.2	74.4	LA 107 north	North end of LA 107 concurrency
Rapides	Deville	54.3	87.4	LA 1206 north	
Rapides	Deville	55.7	89.6	LA 1207 – Pineville	
Rapides	Deville	57.4	92.4	LA 1206 south	
Rapides		60.7	97.7	LA 28	
1.000 mi = 1.609 km; 1.000 km = 0.621 mi: Concurrency terminus

== Louisiana Highway 116 ==
Louisiana Highway 116
- Location: Rapides Parish
- Length: 8.39 mi (13.50 km)
- Existed: 1955–present

Louisiana Highway 116 (LA 116) runs 8.39 miles (13.50 km) from US 165 in Pineville to LA 28 east of Pineville.

== Louisiana Highway 117 ==
Louisiana Highway 117
- Location: Leesville–Hagewood
- Length: 41.52 mi (66.82 km)
- Existed: 1955–present

Louisiana Highway 117 (LA 117) runs 41.52 miles (66.82 km) in a north–south direction from a junction with LA 8, LA 28 and LA 1213 in Leesville, Vernon Parish to LA 6 east of Robeline, Natchitoches Parish.

== Louisiana Highway 118 ==
Louisiana Highway 118
- Location: Florien–Kisatchie
- Length: 26.89 mi (43.28 km)
- Existed: 1955–present

Louisiana Highway 118 (LA 118) runs 26.89 miles (43.28 km) in an east–west direction from US 171 in Florien, Sabine Parish to a point east of Kisatchie, Natchitoches Parish.

== Louisiana Highway 119 ==
Louisiana Highway 119
- Location: Flatwoods–Natchez
- Length: 28.64 mi (46.09 km)
- Existed: 1955–present

Louisiana Highway 119 (LA 119) runs 28.64 miles (46.09 km) in a north–south direction from LA 8 at Flatwoods, Rapides Parish to LA 1 in Natchez, Natchitoches Parish.

== Louisiana Highway 120 ==
Louisiana Highway 120
- Location: Zwolle–Cypress
- Length: 36.24 mi (58.32 km)
- Existed: 1955–present

Louisiana Highway 120 (LA 120) exists in two sections, running a total of 36.24 miles (58.32 km) in an east–west direction. The western section extends from US 171 in Zwolle, Sabine Parish to a point just south of Robeline, Natchitoches Parish. The eastern section extends from LA 117 in Provencal to a junction with LA 1 and LA 494 south of Natchez, Natchitoches Parish.

== Louisiana Highway 121 ==
Louisiana Highway 121
- Location: Slagle–Boyce
- Length: 46.83 mi (75.37 km)
- Existed: 1955–present

Louisiana Highway 121 (LA 121) runs 46.83 miles (75.37 km) in a general southwest to northeast direction from LA 8 at Slagle, Vernon Parish to LA 1 west of Boyce, Rapides Parish.

== Louisiana Highway 122 ==
Louisiana Highway 122
- Location: Montgomery–Dry Prong
- Length: 26.09 mi (41.99 km)
- Existed: 1955–present

Louisiana Highway 122 (LA 122) runs 26.09 miles (41.99 km) from US 71/LA 1239-1 in Montgomery to LA 123 in Dry Prong.

== Louisiana Highway 123 ==
Louisiana Highway 123
- Location: Grant Parish
- Length: 15.97 mi (25.70 km)
- Existed: 1955–present

Louisiana Highway 123 (LA 123) runs 15.97 miles (25.70 km) from LA 8 east of Colfax to US 165 east of Breezy Hill.

== Louisiana Highway 124 ==
Louisiana Highway 124
- Location: Colgrade–Argo
- Length: 91.94 mi (147.96 km)
- Existed: 1955–present

Louisiana Highway 124 (LA 124) runs 91.94 miles (147.96 km) in a general northwest to southeast direction from US 84 east of Winnfield, Winn Parish to LA 3102 at Argo, Catahoula Parish.

== Louisiana Highway 125 ==
Louisiana Highway 125
- Location: Tullos–Olla
- Length: 12.49 mi (20.10 km)
- Existed: 1955–present

Louisiana Highway 125 (LA 125) runs 12.49 miles (20.10 km) from US 165 in Tullos to US 165 northeast of Olla.

== Louisiana Highway 126 ==
Louisiana Highway 126
- Location: Reidhimer–Jonesville
- Length: 97.87 mi (157.51 km)
- Existed: 1955–present

Louisiana Highway 126 (LA 126) runs 97.87 miles (157.51 km) in a general east–west direction from LA 9 in Reidhimer, Natchitoches Parish to LA 124 north of Jonesville, Catahoula Parish.

== Louisiana Highway 127 ==
Louisiana Highway 127
- Location: Rogers–Sikes
- Length: 54.68 mi (88.00 km)
- Existed: 1955–present

Louisiana Highway 127 (LA 127) runs 54.68 miles (88.00 km) in a north–south direction from a point east of Kitterlin Bay in La Salle Parish to LA 126 east of Sikes, Winn Parish.

== Louisiana Highway 128 ==
Louisiana Highway 128
- Location: Fort Necessity–St. Joseph
- Length: 42.08 mi (67.72 km)
- Existed: 1955–present

Louisiana Highway 128 (LA 128) runs 42.08 miles (67.72 km) in an east–west direction from LA 4 east of Fort Necessity, Franklin Parish to a junction with LA 605 and LA 897-4 in St. Joseph, Tensas Parish.

The route heads east from LA 4 and intersects the concurrent US 425 and LA 15 in Gilbert. LA 128 turns north to follow US 425/LA 15 briefly before splitting to the northeast toward Como. Here, it intersects LA 4 once again and runs concurrent with that highway east across the Tensas River, where it crosses from Franklin Parish into Tensas Parish. Shortly afterward, LA 128 separates from LA 4 and heads southeast to a point known as Avondale. LA 128 makes a zigzag via US 65 then proceeds south to its terminus in St. Joseph.

== Louisiana Highway 129 ==
Louisiana Highway 129
- Location: Concordia Parish
- Length: 32.51 mi (52.32 km)
- Existed: 1955–present

Louisiana Highway 129 (LA 129) runs 32.51 miles (52.32 km) in a north–south direction from a point on the Red River south of Acme to US 84 west of Ferriday, Concordia Parish.

== Louisiana Highway 130 ==
Louisiana Highway 130
- Location: Liddieville–Winnsboro
- Length: 7.34 mi (11.81 km)
- Existed: 1955–present

Louisiana Highway 130 (LA 130) runs 7.34 miles (11.81 km) from LA 135 north of Liddieville to US 425/LA 4/LA 15/LA 17 in Winnsboro.

== Louisiana Highway 131 ==
Louisiana Highway 131
- Location: St. Genevieve–Vidalia
- Length: 6.79 mi (10.93 km)
- Existed: 1955–present

Louisiana Highway 131 (LA 131) runs 6.79 miles (10.93 km) from LA 15 at St. Genevieve to US 84/US 425 in Vidalia.

== Louisiana Highway 132 ==
Louisiana Highway 132
- Location: Buckner–Bakers
- Length: 32.91 mi (52.96 km)
- Existed: 1955–present

Louisiana Highway 132 (LA 132) runs 32.91 miles (52.96 km) in an east–west direction from LA 133 north of Buckner, Richland Parish to LA 17 north of Bakers, Franklin Parish.

== Louisiana Highway 133 ==
Louisiana Highway 133
- Location: Columbia–Oak Ridge
- Length: 45.46 mi (73.16 km)
- Existed: 1955–present

Louisiana Highway 133 (LA 133) runs 45.46 miles (73.16 km) in a north–south direction from LA 4 northeast of Columbia, Caldwell Parish to US 425 south of Oak Ridge, Morehouse Parish. Until 2005, LA 133 continued north to Mer Rouge.

== Louisiana Highway 134 ==
Louisiana Highway 134
- Location: Sterlington–Lake Providence
- Length: 65.68 mi (105.70 km)
- Existed: 1955–present

Louisiana Highway 134 (LA 134) runs 65.68 miles (105.70 km) in an east–west direction from US 165 south of Sterlington, Ouachita Parish to US 65 just outside Lake Providence, East Carroll Parish.

== Louisiana Highway 135 ==
Louisiana Highway 135
- Location: Fort Necessity–Rayville
- Length: 34.22 mi (55.07 km)
- Existed: 1955–present

Louisiana Highway 135 (LA 135) runs 34.22 miles (55.07 km) in a north–south direction from LA 4 in Fort Necessity, Franklin Parish to US 425 south of Rayville, Richland Parish.

Parish	Location	mi	km	Destinations	Notes
Franklin	Fort Necessity	0.00	0.00	LA 4	Southern terminus
Franklin	Liddieville	6.76	10.88	LA 870	Eastern terminus of LA 870
Franklin	Liddieville	7.88	12.68	LA 130 east	Western terminus of LA 130
Franklin		11.30	18.19	LA 618 east	Western terminus of LA 618
Richland		15.27	24.57	LA 576	
Richland	Four Forks	21.44	34.50	LA 132 – Mangham	
Richland	Alto	24.17	38.90	LA 15 east – Winnsboro	Southern end of LA 15 concurrency
Richland		24.82	39.94	LA 15 west – Monroe	Northern end of LA 15 concurrency
Richland		27.93	44.95	LA 584 east	Western terminus of LA 584
Richland		32.24	51.89	US 425 – Rayville, Winnsboro	Northern terminus
1.000 mi = 1.609 km; 1.000 km = 0.621 mi: Concurrency terminus

== Louisiana Highway 136 ==
Louisiana Highway 136
- Location: Fairbanks–Sterlington
- Length: 3.49 mi (5.62 km)
- Existed: 1955–present

Louisiana Highway 136 (LA 136) runs 3.49 miles (5.62 km) from LA 134 in Fairbanks to US 165/LA 2 in Sterlington.

== Louisiana Highway 137 ==
Louisiana Highway 137
- Location: Morehouse and Richland Parishes
- Length: 18.08 mi (29.10 km)
- Existed: 1955–2005

Louisiana Highway 137 (LA 137) was a state highway in Louisiana that serves Richland Parish and Morehouse Parish. It spanned 18.08 miles (29.10 km) in a south to north direction.

LA 137 was redesignated as US 425 when it was extended through Louisiana to Mississippi.

== Louisiana Highway 138 ==
Louisiana Highway 138
- Location: Morehouse Parish
- Length: 12.75 mi (20.52 km)
- Existed: 1955–present

Louisiana Highway 138 (LA 138) runs 12.75 miles (20.52 km) from LA 134 south of Collinston to US 165/US 425/LA 2 in Mer Rouge.

== Louisiana Highway 139 ==
Louisiana Highway 139
- Location: Monroe–Bastrop
- Length: 20.21 mi (32.52 km)
- Existed: 1955–present

Louisiana Highway 139 (LA 139) runs 20.21 miles (32.52 km) from US 80 in Monroe to US 165/US 425/LA 2/LA 593 in Bastrop.

== Louisiana Highway 140 ==
Louisiana Highway 140
- Location: Log Cabin–Bonita
- Length: 14.77 mi (23.77 km)
- Existed: 1955–present

Louisiana Highway 140 (LA 140) runs 14.77 miles (23.77 km) from US 425 in Log Cabin to US 165/LA 599 in Bonita.

== Louisiana Highway 141 ==
Louisiana Highway 141
- Location: St. Gabriel
- Length: 4.07 mi (6.55 km)
- Existed: 1955–present

Louisiana Highway 141 (LA 141) runs 4.07 miles (6.55 km) from LA 75 in St. Gabriel to LA 75 in St. Gabriel.

== Louisiana Highway 142 ==
Louisiana Highway 142
- Location: Morehouse Parish
- Length: 8.76 mi (14.10 km)
- Existed: 1955–present

Louisiana Highway 142 (LA 142) runs 8.76 miles (14.10 km) from US 425 north of Bastrop to AR 133 at Arkansas state line northwest of Beekman.

== Louisiana Highway 143 ==
Louisiana Highway 143
- Location: West Monroe–Marion
- Length: 39.94 mi (64.28 km)
- Existed: 1955–present

Louisiana Highway 143 (LA 143) runs 39.94 miles (64.28 km) in a north–south direction from LA 34 in West Monroe, Ouachita Parish to LA 33 in Marion, Union Parish.

== Louisiana Highway 144 ==
Louisiana Highway 144
- Location: Eros–Calhoun
- Length: 9.97 mi (16.05 km)
- Existed: 1955–present

Louisiana Highway 144 (LA 144) runs 9.97 miles (16.05 km) in a north–south direction from LA 34 in Eros, Jackson Parish to LA 151 at Calhoun, Ouachita Parish.

== Louisiana Highway 145 ==
Louisiana Highway 145
- Location: Kelleys–Terrills
- Length: 17.88 mi (28.78 km)
- Existed: 1955–present

Louisiana Highway 145 (LA 145) runs 17.88 miles (28.78 km) in a north–south direction from LA 146 southeast of Ruston in Jackson Parish to LA 15 northeast of Downsville, Union Parish.

== Louisiana Highway 146 ==
Louisiana Highway 146
- Location: Homer–Chatham
- Length: 56.60 mi (91.09 km)
- Existed: 1955–present

Louisiana Highway 146 (LA 146) runs 56.60 miles (91.09 km) in a northwest to southeast direction from the concurrent US 79 and LA 9 in Homer, Claiborne Parish to LA 4 in Chatham, Jackson Parish.

== Louisiana Highway 147 ==
Louisiana Highway 147
- Location: Arcadia–Walker
- Length: 39.76 mi (63.99 km)
- Existed: 1955–present

Louisiana Highway 147 (LA 147) runs 39.76 miles (63.99 km) in a southeast to northwest direction from LA 34 just north of the Jackson Parish–Winn Parish line to LA 9 in Arcadia, Bienville Parish.

== Louisiana Highway 148 ==
Louisiana Highway 148
- Location: Jackson Parish
- Length: 15.65 mi (25.19 km)
- Existed: 1955–present

Louisiana Highway 148 (LA 148) exists in two sections, running a total of 15.65 miles (25.19 km) in an east–west direction. The western section extends from a junction with US 167 and LA 818 at Clay to LA 146 at Vernon, Jackson Parish. The eastern section extends from a point southwest of Eros, Jackson Parish, to the Ouachita Parish line.

== Louisiana Highway 149 ==
Louisiana Highway 149
- Location: Grambling
- Length: 2.74 mi (4.41 km)
- Existed: 1955–present

Louisiana Highway 149 (LA 149) runs 2.74 miles (4.41 km) in a north–south direction along R.W.E. Jones Drive in Grambling, Lincoln Parish. It serves as the principal north–south thoroughfare through the town and connects Grambling State University to both I-20 and the parallel US 80.

The route begins at US 80 near the southern limit of Grambling, an area known as Grambling Corners. LA 149 heads north as an undivided two-lane highway through a rural residential area. After a short distance, the highway widens to four lanes as it begins to pass through the middle of the Grambling State University campus. At College Avenue, LA 149 exits the campus and becomes a two-lane highway once again. It then crosses the Kansas City Southern Railway (KCS) tracks via an overpass and intersects LA 150 (West Martin Luther King Jr. Avenue). LA 149 then curves to the northeast and passes through an interchange with I-20 at Exit 81, leading toward Monroe and Shreveport. State maintenance ends immediately afterward at an intersection with Parish Road 333 (North Pinetree Road), and R.W.E. Jones Drive proceeds northward as a local road.

In the pre-1955 state highway system, LA 149 was part of State Route C-1792. LA 149 was created in the 1955 Louisiana Highway renumbering, largely following a parallel alignment along Main Street. It was also extended north from its original terminus at LA 150 during the early 1960s when I-20 was constructed through the area.

The entire highway is in Grambling, Lincoln Parish.

mi	km	Destinations	Notes
0.0	0.0	US 80 to I-20 – Ruston, Simsboro; LA 3005	Southern terminus; eastern terminus of LA 3005
1.6	2.6	LA 150 (West Martin Luther King Jr. Avenue) – Ruston, Simsboro	
2.3– 2.7	3.7– 4.3	I-20 – Monroe, Shreveport	Exit 81 on I-20
2.8	4.5	PR 333 (North Pinetree Road)	Northern terminus
1.000 mi = 1.609 km; 1.000 km = 0.621 mi
