= Louisiana Highway 181 =

State highway in Louisiana, United States

Louisiana Highway 181

- Route of LA 181 highlighted in red

Route information
- Maintained by Louisiana DOTD
- Length: 4.216 mi (6.785 km)
- Existed: 1955 renumbering–present

Major junctions
- South end: LA 115 in Lone Pine
- I-49 south of Cheneyville
- North end: US 71 in Cheneyville

Location
- Country: United States
- State: Louisiana
- Parishes: Evangeline, Rapides

Highway system
- Louisiana State Highway System; Interstate; US; State; Scenic
← LA 180	→ LA 182

Louisiana Highway 181 (LA 181) is a state highway located in central Louisiana. It runs 4.22 miles (6.79 km) in a north–south direction from LA 115 in Lone Pine to U.S. Highway 71 (US 71) in Cheneyville.

The route connects the small town of Cheneyville in southeastern Rapides Parish with Interstate 49 (I-49) and points along rural LA 115.

== Route description ==
From the south, LA 181 begins at an intersection with LA 115 at a point known as Lone Pine in northern Evangeline Parish. LA 115 heads east toward Bunkie and south toward St. Landry. From this intersection, LA 181 proceeds north along Cheneyville Road. 0.6 miles (0.97 km) later, after curving to the northeast, LA 181 crosses into Rapides Parish.

1.6 miles (2.6 km) across the parish line, LA 181 passes through an interchange with I-49, which connects to Alexandria on the north and Opelousas on the south. LA 181 continues northeast for another 1.4 miles (2.3 km), where it enters the town of Cheneyville on Greenwood Avenue. Immediately after crossing the Union Pacific Railroad (UP) tracks, the route ends at an intersection with US 71 (Front Street). US 71 parallels I-49 northward toward Alexandria and heads southeast toward Baton Rouge.

The route is classified as a rural minor collector by the Louisiana Department of Transportation and Development (La DOTD) with an average daily traffic volume of 620 in 2013. It has a posted speed limit of 55 mph (90 km/h), reduced to 45 mph (70 km/h) entering Cheneyville and 35 mph (55 km/h) as it approaches US 71. LA 181 is an undivided two-lane highway for the majority of its route, widening briefly to a divided four-lane highway through the interchange with I-49.

== History ==
In the original Louisiana Highway system in use between 1921 and 1955, the modern LA 181 made up the northern portion of State Route 271. Route 271 was designated in 1928 by an act of the state legislature. It roughly followed the present route of LA 115 from LA 106 west of St. Landry northward along Bayou Cocodrie to Lone Pine. From there, it continued along the present route of LA 181 to US 71 in Cheneyville. Here, it made a jog southeast onto US 71 then north through town across Bayou Boeuf, ending at Bayou Road. The route was originally projected to continue northward to Echo, but no such roadway was built in the pre-1955 system.

La 181—From a junction with La 115 at or near Lonepine north to a junction with La-US 71 at or near Cheneyville.

— 1955 legislative route description

LA 181 was created with the 1955 Louisiana Highway renumbering following the portion of former Route 271 from Lone Pine to Cheneyville. Its route has remained the same to the present day.

== Future ==
La DOTD is currently engaged in a program that aims to transfer about 5,000 miles (8,000 km) of state-owned roadways to local governments over the next several years. Under this plan of "right-sizing" the state highway system, the entire route of LA 181 is proposed for deletion as it does not meet a significant interurban travel function.

== Major intersections ==
Parish	Location	mi	km	Destinations	Notes
Evangeline	Lone Pine	0.000	0.000	LA 115 – Bunkie, St. Landry	Southern terminus
Rapides		2.234– 2.396	3.595– 3.856	I-49 – Alexandria, Opelousas	Exit 56 on I-49
Rapides	Cheneyville	4.216	6.785	US 71 – Alexandria, Baton Rouge	Northern terminus
1.000 mi = 1.609 km; 1.000 km = 0.621 mi
