= Johnny North =

American football player and coach (1921–2010)

- North extends to make a catch in 1950

No. 55
- Positions: End, defensive end, defensive back

Personal information
- Born: June 17, 1921; Gilliam, Louisiana, U.S.
- Died: July 6, 2010 (aged 89); Covington, Louisiana, U.S.
- Listed height: 6 ft 2 in (1.88 m)
- Listed weight: 199 lb (90 kg)

Career information
- High school: Castle Heights Military Academy (Lebanon, Tennessee)
- College: Vanderbilt (1942, 1946-1947)
- NFL draft: 1945: 6th round, 51st overall pick

Career history

Playing
- Baltimore Colts (1948-1950)

Coaching
- Tennessee Tech (1954) Assistant; Kentucky (1956–1961) Assistant; LSU (1962–1964) Assistant; Detroit Lions (1965–1972) Receivers coach; New Orleans Saints (1973) Offensive coordinator/receivers coach; New Orleans Saints (1973–1975) Head coach; Atlanta Falcons (1976–1982) Running backs coach; New Orleans Breakers (1984) Quarterbacks coach

Awards and highlights
- First-team All-SEC (1947); Second-team All-SEC (1946)

Career NFL/AAFC statistics
- Receptions: 38
- Receiving yards: 784
- Total touchdowns: 6
- Stats at Pro Football Reference
- Coaching profile at Pro Football Reference

John Puckett North (June 17, 1921 – July 6, 2010) was an American football player and coach. He played offensive and defensive end in the National Football League (NFL) for the Baltimore Colts, as well as for the Baltimore Colts of the All-America Football Conference (AAFC). He played college football at Vanderbilt University and was drafted in the sixth round of the 1945 NFL draft by the Washington Redskins.

== Biography ==
A native of Gilliam, Johnny North grew up in Old Hickory, Tenn. He lettered in football, basketball and track at Castle Heights High School in Tennessee. He is a member of the Castle Heights Hall of Fame.

After receiving several offers, he signed with Vanderbilt, where he played football and basketball and ran track in 1942. But after his freshman year, he enlisted in the Marines to fight in World War II at the age of 17. He achieved the rank of sergeant, but was wounded on the Island of Tinian, having been shot multiple times in both calves, and was rushed to medical care. His parents were told that he had died, and upon discovering he was alive but injured, inquired about his condition. The doctors said he would never walk again. This proved only to hold true for about a year. He had begun walking around the hospital on his hands in his free time, and pushed himself hard in physical therapy, that he soon regained his strength. He was awarded a Purple Heart.

After his playing career, North moved into coaching. He was a high school coach in Alabama, then in college at Tennessee Tech, Kentucky, and LSU before moving into the professional ranks with the Detroit Lions. In 1973, he became offensive coordinator of New Orleans Saints. With two games remaining in the 1973 preseason, head coach J.D. Roberts was fired and North was chosen to replace him.

In his first regular season game, the Saints were embarrassed at Tulane Stadium by the rival Atlanta Falcons 62–7. New Orleans went 5–9 in both 1973 and 1974, the team's final seasons at Tulane Stadium. North led the Saints into the Louisiana Superdome in 1975, but was fired on October 27 following a 38–14 loss to the Los Angeles Rams which left the team 1–5. He subsequently spent seven years as an assistant coach for the Atlanta Falcons and one season as quarterback coach for the USFL New Orleans Breakers.
