= Louisiana Highway 106 =

State highway in Louisiana, United States

Louisiana Highway 106

Route information
- Maintained by Louisiana DOTD
- Length: 24.2 mi (38.9 km)
- Existed: 1955 renumbering–present

Major junctions
- West end: LA 10 east of Oakdale
- LA 13 in Pine Prairie; US 167 in Bayou Chicot; I-49 northeast of St. Landry
- East end: LA 29 south of Bunkie

Location
- Country: United States
- State: Louisiana
- Parishes: Evangeline, Avoyelles

Highway system
- Louisiana State Highway System; Interstate; US; State; Scenic
← LA 105	→ LA 107

Louisiana Highway 106 (LA 106) is a state highway located primarily in Evangeline Parish that runs 24.2 miles (38.9 km) in a west–east direction from LA 10 east of Oakdale to LA 29 south of Bunkie. Along the way, LA 106 passes through the towns of Pine Prairie and St. Landry and intersects U.S. Highway 167 (US 167). Near the east end of its route, LA 106 passes through an interchange with Interstate 49 (I-49) between Opelousas and Alexandria in the southwest corner of Avoyelles Parish.

== Route description ==
From the west, LA 106 begins at an intersection with LA 10 3.2 miles (5.1 km) east of Oakdale at a point known as Beaver. It proceeds in a general eastern direction along Beaver Road for 8.6 miles (13.8 km), making a long curve to the south and back to the east for much of the distance. It then skirts the northern border of Pine Prairie briefly and intersects LA 13 (Veterans Memorial Boulevard), which heads to Mamou on the south. LA 106 turns north and travels in a concurrency with LA 13 for less than a mile. At a four-way intersection, LA 13 continues north to Turkey Creek where it connects with US 167 to Alexandria; LA 3187 (Crooked Creek Parkway) begins to the west; and LA 106 turns to the east. After heading in a general northeast direction along St. Landry Highway for 4.5 miles (7.2 km), LA 106 reaches a point known as Bayou Chicot. Here it intersects US 167 which, apart from its aforementioned northerly destinations, heads south to Ville Platte, the seat of Evangeline Parish.

Continuing northeast for 2.0 miles (3.2 km), LA 106 intersects LA 3042 (Chicot Park Road) which leads to the Chicot State Park and Arboretum and parallels US 167 south to Ville Platte. After another 3.1 miles (5.0 km), LA 106 intersects LA 115 which parallels Bayou Cocodrie north to Lone Pine. Soon afterward, LA 106 crosses a bridge over the bayou and enters St. Landry. LA 106 then crosses the Acadiana Railway (AKDN) tracks and takes a sharp turn to the north out of town. It shortly resumes its northeastern course for 1.5 miles (2.4 km) before crossing from Evangeline Parish into Avoyelles Parish.

In Avoyelles Parish, LA 106 turns east and passes through a diamond interchange with I-49 at Exit 46. I-49 heads to Alexandria on the north and Opelousas on the south. LA 106 ends shortly thereafter at an intersection with LA 29 5.6 miles (9.0 km) south of Bunkie in an area known as Milburn.

LA 106 is an undivided, two-lane highway for its entire length, except for a brief portion that widens to a divided four-lane highway passing through the interchange with I-49.

== History ==
In the original Louisiana Highway system in use between 1921 and 1955, the modern LA 106 made up parts of several routes, including State Route 482 from the western terminus at Beaver to Bayou Chicot; and State Route 23 to the eastern terminus at Milburn.

LA 106 was created with the 1955 Louisiana Highway renumbering, and its route has remained unchanged to the present day.

== Major intersections ==
Parish	Location	mi	km	Destinations	Notes
Evangeline	Beaver	0.0	0.0	LA 10 (Oakdale Highway) – Oakdale, Ville Platte	Western terminus
Evangeline	Pine Prairie	9.2	14.8	LA 13 south (Veterans Memorial Highway) – Mamou, Ville Platte	West end of LA 13 concurrency
Evangeline		9.8	15.8	LA 13 north (Veterans Memorial Highway) – Turkey Creek, Alexandria; LA 3187 (Crooked Creek Parkway)	East end of LA 13 concurrency; southern terminus of LA 3187
Evangeline	Bayou Chicot	14.3	23.0	US 167 – Ville Platte, Turkey Creek	
Evangeline		16.3	26.2	LA 3042 (Chicot Park Road) – Chicot State Park and Arboretum	Northern terminus of LA 3042
Evangeline		19.4	31.2	LA 115 – Lone Pine	Southern terminus of LA 115
Avoyelles		23.2	37.3	I-49 – Alexandria, Opelousas	Exit 46 on I-49
Avoyelles	Milburn	24.2	38.9	LA 29 – Bunkie, Marksville	Eastern terminus
1.000 mi = 1.609 km; 1.000 km = 0.621 mi: Concurrency terminus
