= Buckner, Louisiana =

- Unincorporated community
- Location within Louisiana Location within the United States
- Coordinates: 32°18′04″N 91°56′19″W
- Country: United States
- State: Louisiana
- Parish: Richland
- Elevation: 72 ft (22 m)
- Time zone: UTC-6 (Central (CST))
  - Summer (DST): UTC-5 (CDT)
- Area code: 318
- GNIS feature ID: 543038
- FIPS code: 22-10775

Buckner is an unincorporated community in Richland Parish, Louisiana, United States. The community is located 17 miles (27.36 kilometres) SE of Monroe, Louisiana.
