= Ida, Louisiana =

- Village
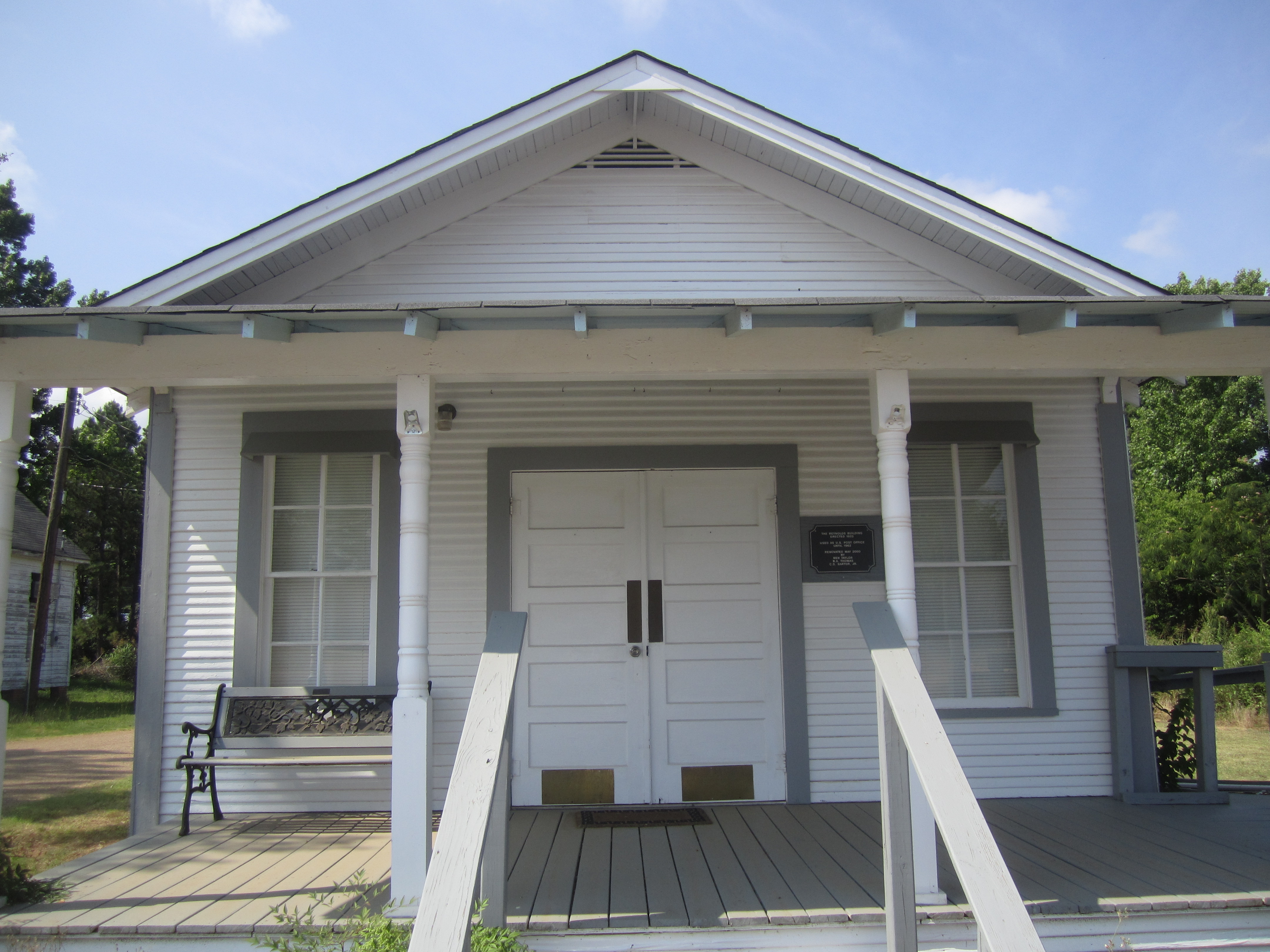
- Capt. Fletcher E. Adams 357th Fighter Group Museum
- Motto: The northgate to Louisiana
- Location of Ida in Caddo Parish, Louisiana.

- Location of Louisiana in the United States
- Coordinates: 33°00′11″N 93°53′44″W
- Country: United States
- State: Louisiana
- Parish: Caddo

Area
  - Total: 1.28 sq mi (3.32 km^{2})
  - Land: 1.28 sq mi (3.32 km^{2})
  - Water: 0 sq mi (0.00 km^{2})
- Elevation: 246 ft (75 m)

Population (2020)
  - Total: 217
  - Density: 169.3/sq mi (65.36/km^{2})
- Time zone: UTC-6 (CST)
  - Summer (DST): UTC-5 (CDT)
- Area code: 318
- FIPS code: 22-36885
- GNIS feature ID: 2407479
- Website: villageofida.godaddysites.com

Ida is a village in Caddo Parish, Louisiana, United States. The population was 217 at the 2020 census. It is part of the Shreveport–Bossier City metropolitan area. Ida and nearby Rodessa are the most northwesterly communities in Louisiana. It is nearby I-49.

== History ==
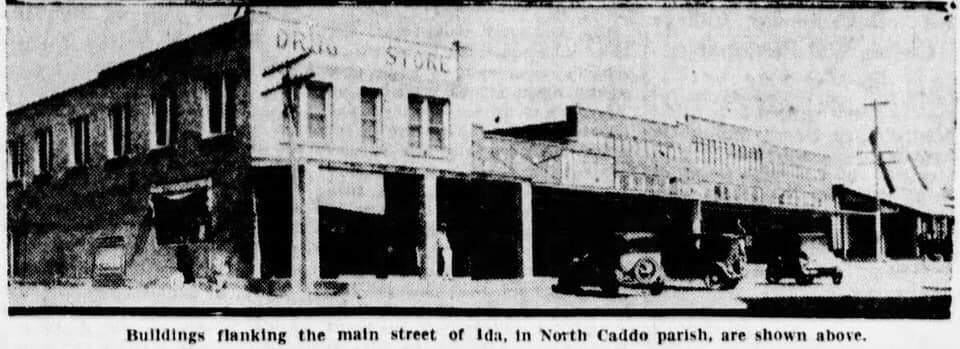
Ida's Main Street seen in the Shreveport Times on April 19, 1933.

Settlement of the area likely began after the end of the American Civil War, with the construction of the Munnerlyn Chapel in 1877 and the first school house in 1883. A post office was constructed in 1897 which spurred an increase in population. In 1905, the Ida Methodist Church was built. It continues to serve the community today at 6874 Cedar Lane, despite its bell tower being removed.

Ida was incorporated as a village in 1967.

== Geography ==
Ida is located in Caddo Parish, just south of the Arkansas border. US 71 runs through the village, leading north 34 miles (55 km) to Texarkana, AR, and south 36 miles (58 km) to Shreveport. I-49 runs parallel to US 71 between the two cities and bypasses Ida just to west with one exit serving the village, Exit 245 (LA 168).

According to the United States Census Bureau, the village has a total area of 1.4 square miles (3.6 km^{2}), all land.

== Demographics ==
Historical population
Census	Pop.	Note	%±
1970	370		—
1980	306		−17.3%
1990	250		−18.3%
2000	258		3.2%
2010	221		−14.3%
2020	217		−1.8%
2025 (est.)	209	▼	−3.7%
U.S. Decennial Census

As of the census of 2000, there were 258 people, 117 households, and 80 families residing in the village. The population density was 185.4 inhabitants per square mile (71.6/km^{2}). There were 133 housing units at an average density of 95.6 per square mile (36.9/km^{2}). The racial makeup of the village was 97.67% White, 1.55% African American, 0.39% Native American, and 0.39% from two or more races. Hispanic or Latino of any race were 0.39% of the population.

There were 117 households, out of which 21.4% had children under the age of 18 living with them, 62.4% were married couples living together, 5.1% had a female householder with no husband present, and 30.8% were non-families. 28.2% of all households were made up of individuals, and 12.0% had someone living alone who was 65 years of age or older. The average household size was 2.21 and the average family size was 2.70.

In the village, the population was spread out, with 20.5% under the age of 18, 5.0% from 18 to 24, 21.3% from 25 to 44, 29.5% from 45 to 64, and 23.6% who were 65 years of age or older. The median age was 46 years. For every 100 females, there were 92.5 males. For every 100 females age 18 and over, there were 89.8 males.

The median income for a household in the village was $26,667, and the median income for a family was $32,778. Males had a median income of $24,375 versus $20,781 for females. The per capita income for the village was $14,166. About 21.1% of families and 22.0% of the population were below the poverty line, including 30.4% of those under the age of eighteen and 19.7% of those 65 or over.

== Education ==
It is in the Caddo Parish School District.

== Sites of interest ==
The Capt. Fletcher E. Adams United States Air Force 357th Fighter Group Museum occupies the former W. C. Reynolds Building on East Magnolia Avenue in the center of town. Adams was a World War II flying ace. The Reynolds building was the Ida post office from 1923 to 1962, then in 1997 became the Ida Museum. In 2010 it acquired its current name.
