= Gilliam, Louisiana =

- Village
- Location of Gilliam in Caddo Parish, Louisiana.

- Location of Louisiana in the United States
- Coordinates: 32°49′42″N 93°50′30″W
- Country: United States
- State: Louisiana
- Parish: Caddo

Area
  - Total: 2.37 sq mi (6.13 km^{2})
  - Land: 2.37 sq mi (6.13 km^{2})
  - Water: 0 sq mi (0.00 km^{2})
- Elevation: 194 ft (59 m)

Population (2020)
  - Total: 123
  - Density: 52.0/sq mi (20.08/km^{2})
- Time zone: UTC-6 (CST)
  - Summer (DST): UTC-5 (CDT)
- Area code: 318
- FIPS code: 22-29010
- GNIS feature ID: 2407464

Gilliam is a village in Caddo Parish, Louisiana, United States. As of the 2020 census, Gilliam had a population of 123. It is part of the Shreveport–Bossier City Metropolitan Statistical Area.

== History ==
On May 13, 1908, a tornado struck the community around dinnertime, killing 34 people and devastating the town, leaving only two homes standing. Fifteen others were killed in nearby communities.

== Geography ==
Gilliam is located in northeastern Caddo Parish. U.S. Route 71 passes through the west side of the village, leading south 4 miles (6 km) to Belcher and 22 miles (35 km) to Shreveport. To the north, US 71 leads 4 miles (6 km) to Hosston and 14 miles (23 km) to the Arkansas border.

According to the United States Census Bureau, Gilliam has a total area of 2.0 square miles (5.2 km^{2}), all land.

== Demographics ==
Historical population
| Census | Pop. | Note | %± |
|---|---|---|---|
| 1970 | 211 | | — |
| 1980 | 244 | | 15.6% |
| 1990 | 202 | | −17.2% |
| 2000 | 178 | | −11.9% |
| 2010 | 164 | | −7.9% |
| 2020 | 123 | | −25.0% |
| 2025 (est.) | 116 | ▼ | −5.7% |
U.S. Decennial Census

As of the census of 2000, there were 178 people, 71 households, and 47 families residing in the village. The population density was 88.8 inhabitants per square mile (34.3/km^{2}). There were 79 housing units at an average density of 39.4 per square mile (15.2/km^{2}). The racial makeup of the village was 55.06% White, and 44.94% African American. Hispanic or Latino of any race were 0.56% of the population.

There were 71 households, out of which 22.5% had children under the age of 18 living with them, 49.3% were married couples living together, 8.5% had a female householder with no husband present, and 32.4% were non-families. 29.6% of all households were made up of individuals, and 12.7% had someone living alone who was 65 years of age or older. The average household size was 2.51 and the average family size was 3.13.

In the village, the population was spread out, with 23.0% under the age of 18, 10.1% from 18 to 24, 25.3% from 25 to 44, 28.7% from 45 to 64, and 12.9% who were 65 years of age or older. The median age was 38 years. For every 100 females, there were 117.1 males. For every 100 females age 18 and over, there were 107.6 males.

The median income for a household in the village was $29,375, and the median income for a family was $39,375. Males had a median income of $36,875 versus $23,750 for females. The per capita income for the village was $30,264. About 20.5% of families and 24.2% of the population were below the poverty line, including 35.7% of those under the age of eighteen and 14.3% of those 65 or over.

== Education ==
It is in the Caddo Parish School District.

== Notable Person ==
- John North, New Orleans Saints head coach 1973-75
