= Belcher, Louisiana =

- Village
- Location of Belcher in Caddo Parish, Louisiana.

- Location of Louisiana in the United States
- Coordinates: 32°45′02″N 93°50′02″W
- Country: United States
- State: Louisiana
- Parish: Caddo

Area
  - Total: 1.58 sq mi (4.08 km^{2})
  - Land: 1.58 sq mi (4.08 km^{2})
  - Water: 0 sq mi (0.00 km^{2})
- Elevation: 184 ft (56 m)

Population (2020)
  - Total: 248
  - Estimate (2024): 237 ▼
  - Density: 157.5/sq mi (60.82/km^{2})
- Time zone: UTC-6 (CST)
  - Summer (DST): UTC-5 (CDT)
- Area code: 318
- FIPS code: 22-05945
- GNIS feature ID: 2407417
- Website: www.villageofbelcher.com

Belcher is a village in Caddo Parish, Louisiana, United States. As of the 2020 census, Belcher had a population of 248. It is part of the Shreveport- Bossier city metropolitan statistical area.

== History ==
Previously named Horseshoe after the bayou that runs through the town, Belcher was renamed in 1899 after James Clinton Belcher, a former Confederate soldier and overseer of Wild Lucia Plantation.

== Geography ==
Belcher is located in northeastern Caddo Parish, less than 1 mile (1.6 km) northwest of the Red River. U.S. Route 71 passes through the western side of the village, leading north 5 miles (8 km) to Gilliam and south 17 miles (27 km) to Shreveport. Interstate 49, accessible from Exit 228, is 3 miles (5 km) west of the center of town.

According to the United States Census Bureau, Belcher has a total area of 1.56 square miles (4.04 km^{2}), all land.

== Demographics ==
Historical population
Census	Pop.	Note	%±
1970	482		—
1980	436		−9.5%
1990	249		−42.9%
2000	272		9.2%
2010	263		−3.3%
2020	248		−5.7%
2025 (est.)	240	▼	−3.2%
U.S. Decennial Census

As of the census of 2000, there were 272 people, 99 households, and 78 families residing in the village. The population density was 174.7 inhabitants per square mile (67.5/km^{2}). There were 107 housing units at an average density of 68.7 per square mile (26.5/km^{2}). The racial makeup of the village was 75.37% White, 23.90% African American and 0.74% Native American.

There were 99 households, out of which 41.4% had children under the age of 18 living with them, 65.7% were married couples living together, 9.1% had a female householder with no husband present, and 21.2% were non-families. 17.2% of all households were made up of individuals, and 7.1% had someone living alone who was 65 years of age or older. The average household size was 2.75 and the average family size was 3.13.

In the village, the population was spread out, with 29.4% under the age of 18, 7.4% from 18 to 24, 30.1% from 25 to 44, 21.7% from 45 to 64, and 11.4% who were 65 years of age or older. The median age was 35 years. For every 100 females, there were 98.5 males. For every 100 females age 18 and over, there were 106.5 males.

The median income for a household in the village was $39,167, and the median income for a family was $40,469. Males had a median income of $28,750 versus $20,000 for females. The per capita income for the village was $16,954. About 6.3% of families and 4.8% of the population were below the poverty line, including none of those under the age of eighteen and 4.3% of those 65 or over.

== Education ==
It is in the Caddo Parish School District.

== Notable people ==
- Clyde Connell, sculptor
- Lloyd Hendrick, state senator from 1940 to 1948; graduated from Belcher High School
