= Slagle, Louisiana =

- Unincorporated community
- Location within Louisiana Location within the United States
- Coordinates: 31°12′09″N 93°07′39″W
- Country: United States
- State: Louisiana
- Parish: Vernon
- Elevation: 276 ft (84 m)
- Time zone: UTC-6 (Central (CST))
  - Summer (DST): UTC-5 (CDT)
- ZIP code: 71475
- Area code: 337
- GNIS feature ID: 543673

Slagle is an unincorporated community in Vernon Parish, Louisiana, United States. Its ZIP code is 71475.
