= Gorum, Louisiana =

- Unincorporated community
- Location within Louisiana Location within the United States
- Coordinates: 31°25′59″N 92°56′37″W
- Country: United States
- State: Louisiana
- Parish: Natchitoches
- Elevation: 138 ft (42 m)
- Time zone: UTC-6 (Central (CST))
  - Summer (DST): UTC-5 (CDT)
- ZIP code: 71434
- Area code: 318
- GNIS feature ID: 547408

Gorum is an unincorporated community in Natchitoches Parish, Louisiana, United States. The community is located on Louisiana Highway 119, 24 miles (39 km) south-southeast of Natchitoches. Gorum has a post office with ZIP code 71434, which opened on November 21, 1890.
