= Chopin, Louisiana =

Chopin
- Unincorporated community
- Location within the state of Louisiana Chopin (the United States)
- Coordinates: 31°29′49″N 92°51′34″W
- Country: United States
- State: Louisiana
- Parish: Natchitoches
- Time zone: UTC-6 (Central (CST))
  - Summer (DST): UTC-5 (CDT)
- GNIS feature ID: 543085

Chopin (also recorded as Chotin) is an unincorporated community in Natchitoches Parish, Louisiana, United States. It is located approximately 19 miles (31 km) southeast of Natchitoches, and Interstate 49 (exit 113) intersects Louisiana Highway 490 near this community. It was named after Kate Chopin, an author of short stories and novels.

The community is part of the Natchitoches Micropolitan Statistical Area.
