= Flatwoods, Louisiana =

- Unincorporated community
- Location within Louisiana Location within the United States
- Coordinates: 31°24′10″N 92°52′06″W
- Country: United States
- State: Louisiana
- Parish: Rapides
- Elevation: 299 ft (91 m)
- Time zone: UTC-6 (Central (CST))
  - Summer (DST): UTC-5 (CDT)
- ZIP code: 71427
- Area code: 318
- GNIS feature ID: 543205

Flatwoods is an unincorporated community in Rapides Parish, Louisiana, United States. Its ZIP code is 71427.
