= Boyce, Louisiana =

- Town
- Town of Boyce
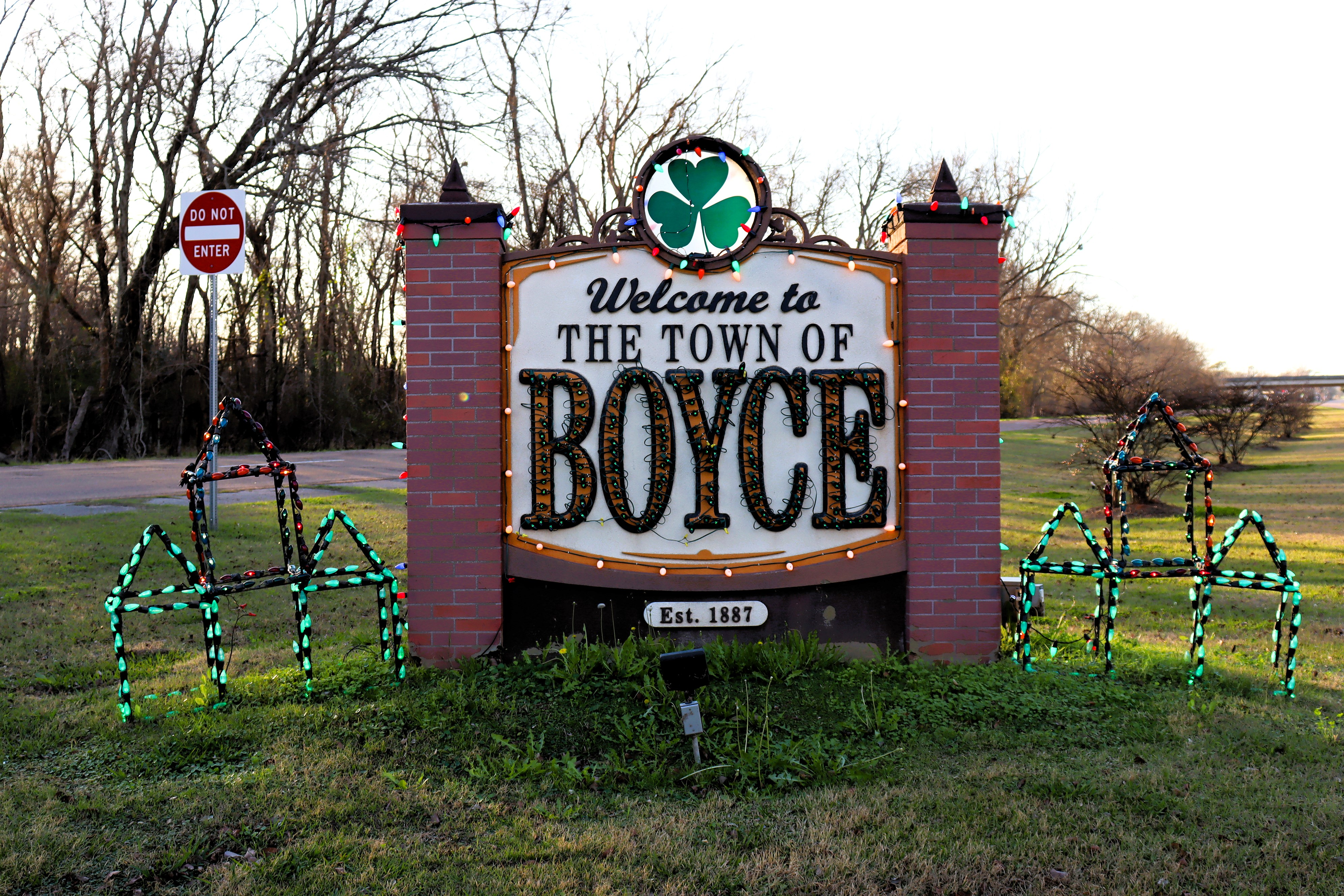
- Boyce Welcome Sign

- Location of Boyce in Rapides Parish, Louisiana.

- Location of Louisiana in the United States
- Coordinates: 31°23′26″N 92°40′12″W
- Country: United States
- State: Louisiana
- Parish: Rapides

Area
  - Total: 0.62 sq mi (1.60 km^{2})
  - Land: 0.46 sq mi (1.19 km^{2})
  - Water: 0.16 sq mi (0.41 km^{2})
- Elevation: 89 ft (27 m)

Population (2020)
  - Total: 888
  - Density: 1,932.1/sq mi (745.97/km^{2})
- Time zone: UTC-6 (CST)
  - Summer (DST): UTC-5 (CDT)
- ZIP code: 71409
- Area code: 318
- FIPS code: 22-09165
- GNIS feature ID: 2405308
- Website: www.townofboyce.com

Boyce is a town in northern Rapides Parish, Louisiana, United States. It is part of the Alexandria, Louisiana Metropolitan Statistical Area. The population was 888 at the 2020 census. The community is nearly 70 percent African American.

== History ==
Originally called Cotile Landing, the name was changed to Boyce in 1880, when the Texas and Pacific Railroad made Boyce its terminal point. The town was named for Judge Henry Boyce, who owned the land on which the town was located. Being of Irish descent, Boyce, and/or his son Henry Archinard Boyce, gave all the streets Irish names as he did his own cotton farmland, Ulster, which was immediately adjacent to the town along Bayou Jeunes des Gens (Jean de Jean). The post office was moved more than once but was returned to Boyce in 1883 and the Postal Service chose Boyce, even though there was a majority opposition, because the train depot already carried that name. Under charter of May 7, 1887, Boyce was organized and a council elected.

== Geography ==
According to the United States Census Bureau, the town has a total area of 0.6 square miles (1.6 km^{2}), of which 0.5 square miles (1.3 km^{2}) is land and 0.1 square miles (0.26 km^{2}) (8.62%) is water.

A number of small bayous, such as Bayou Jean de Jean and Bayou Helen, are located just outside the town.

An island in the Red River North of the town was created with the straightening of the portion of the river next to the Town by the Army Corps of Engineers. The owners of the Island named it St. Alfred Island, after Alfred Boyce Wettermark, (1916-2010).

=== Climate ===
Boyce has a humid subtropical climate (Köppen: Cfa) with long, hot summers and short, mild winters.

Climate data for Boyce 3 WNW, Louisiana (1991–2020 normals, extremes 1976–present)
Month	Jan	Feb	Mar	Apr	May	Jun	Jul	Aug	Sep	Oct	Nov	Dec	Year
Record high °F (°C)	81 (27)	86 (30)	87 (31)	95 (35)	102 (39)	101 (38)	104 (40)	107 (42)	106 (41)	94 (34)	86 (30)	82 (28)	107 (42)
Mean maximum °F (°C)	74.2 (23.4)	77.1 (25.1)	82.4 (28.0)	86.1 (30.1)	91.0 (32.8)	94.5 (34.7)	96.9 (36.1)	97.8 (36.6)	94.5 (34.7)	88.8 (31.6)	81.2 (27.3)	76.3 (24.6)	98.6 (37.0)
Mean daily maximum °F (°C)	56.2 (13.4)	60.0 (15.6)	67.3 (19.6)	74.3 (23.5)	81.2 (27.3)	86.6 (30.3)	88.9 (31.6)	89.0 (31.7)	84.5 (29.2)	76.0 (24.4)	65.4 (18.6)	57.8 (14.3)	73.9 (23.3)
Daily mean °F (°C)	47.5 (8.6)	50.9 (10.5)	57.9 (14.4)	65.0 (18.3)	72.5 (22.5)	78.4 (25.8)	80.6 (27.0)	80.6 (27.0)	75.8 (24.3)	66.1 (18.9)	55.8 (13.2)	49.2 (9.6)	65.0 (18.3)
Mean daily minimum °F (°C)	38.7 (3.7)	41.9 (5.5)	48.5 (9.2)	55.6 (13.1)	63.7 (17.6)	70.2 (21.2)	72.4 (22.4)	72.1 (22.3)	67.0 (19.4)	56.3 (13.5)	46.2 (7.9)	40.6 (4.8)	56.1 (13.4)
Mean minimum °F (°C)	24.7 (−4.1)	29.2 (−1.6)	34.2 (1.2)	42.1 (5.6)	53.0 (11.7)	64.7 (18.2)	69.2 (20.7)	67.8 (19.9)	56.9 (13.8)	42.2 (5.7)	33.0 (0.6)	28.5 (−1.9)	22.7 (−5.2)
Record low °F (°C)	9 (−13)	7 (−14)	23 (−5)	31 (−1)	42 (6)	55 (13)	59 (15)	56 (13)	43 (6)	30 (−1)	20 (−7)	7 (−14)	7 (−14)
Average precipitation inches (mm)	5.78 (147)	5.04 (128)	5.79 (147)	5.61 (142)	4.37 (111)	5.19 (132)	4.85 (123)	3.35 (85)	4.25 (108)	5.12 (130)	5.39 (137)	6.03 (153)	60.77 (1,544)
Average precipitation days (≥ 0.01 in)	10.3	10.0	9.1	8.1	8.6	10.3	10.0	8.3	7.2	6.8	8.7	11.2	108.6
Average snowy days (≥ 0.1 in)	0.1	0.0	0.0	0.0	0.0	0.0	0.0	0.0	0.0	0.0	0.0	0.0	0.1
Source: NOAA

== Demographics ==
Historical population
Census	Pop.	Note	%±
1890	301		—
1900	832		176.4%
1910	865		4.0%
1920	1,060		22.5%
1930	820		−22.6%
1940	732		−10.7%
1950	981		34.0%
1960	1,094		11.5%
1970	1,240		13.3%
1980	1,198		−3.4%
1990	1,361		13.6%
2000	1,190		−12.6%
2010	1,004		−15.6%
2020	888		−11.6%
2025 (est.)	864	▼	−2.7%
U.S. Decennial Census

=== 2020 census ===
Boyce racial composition
Race	Number	Percentage
White (non-Hispanic)	207	23.31%
Black or African American (non-Hispanic)	615	69.26%
Native American	6	0.68%
Asian	1	0.11%
Other/Mixed	27	3.04%
Hispanic or Latino	32	3.6%

As of the 2020 United States census, there were 888 people, 352 households, and 227 families residing in the town.

=== 2000 census ===
As of the census of 2000, there were 1,190 people, 426 households, and 310 families residing in the town. The population density was 2,239.5 inhabitants per square mile (864.7/km^{2}). There were 485 housing units at an average density of 912.7 per square mile (352.4/km^{2}). The racial makeup of the town was 23.19% White, 74.37% African American, 0.08% Native American, 0.42% Asian, 0.25% from other races, and 1.68% from two or more races. Hispanic or Latino of any race were 0.67% of the population.

There were 426 households, out of which 40.4% had children under the age of 18 living with them, 35.0% were married couples living together, 35.0% had a female householder with no husband present, and 27.2% were non-families. 23.2% of all households were made up of individuals, and 11.5% had someone living alone who was 65 years of age or older. The average household size was 2.79 and the average family size was 3.32.

In the town, the population was spread out, with 34.8% under the age of 18, 11.8% from 18 to 24, 23.3% from 25 to 44, 18.1% from 45 to 64, and 12.1% who were 65 years of age or older. The median age was 29 years. For every 100 females, there were 77.1 males. For every 100 females age 18 and over, there were 67.2 males.

The median income for a household in the town was $17,727, and the median income for a family was $20,000. Males had a median income of $24,000 versus $13,600 for females. The per capita income for the town was $9,616. About 37.9% of families and 40.7% of the population were below the poverty line, including 52.3% of those under age 18 and 27.1% of those age 65 or over.

== Education ==
Boyce is served by Northwood High School, which opened in 1988, as a new consolidation of the old Boyce Junior High School and the former A. (Alfred) Wettermark High School.

== Notable people ==
- Henry Boyce, federal judge and member of the Louisiana state legislature.
- Lloyd George Teekell, state representative and a judge of the 9th Judicial District Court
- Jim Willis, resident of Boyce who pitched for the Chicago Cubs
