= Saint Landry, Louisiana =

- Unincorporated community
- Location within Louisiana Location within the United States
- Coordinates: 30°50′40″N 92°15′28″W
- Country: United States
- State: Louisiana
- Parish: Evangeline
- Elevation: 49 ft (15 m)
- Time zone: UTC-6 (Central (CST))
  - Summer (DST): UTC-5 (CDT)
- ZIP code: 71367
- Area code: 318/457
- GNIS feature ID: 538931

Saint Landry is an unincorporated community in Evangeline Parish, Louisiana, United States. Its ZIP code is 71367.
