= List of state highways in Louisiana (1200–1299) =

The following is a list of state highways in the U.S. state of Louisiana designated in the 1200–1299 range.

All are owned and maintained by the Louisiana Department of Transportation and Development (La DOTD). The routes up to and including LA 1241 were designated in the 1955 Louisiana Highway renumbering. The remainder have been added to the system in numerical order as needed, beginning with LA 1242 in 1998. All but thirteen of the routes on this list are proposed for deletion as part of La DOTD's Road Transfer Program.

== Louisiana Highway 1200 ==
Louisiana Highway 1200
- Location: Wilda–Boyce
- Length: 9.998 mi (16.090 km)
- Existed: 1955–present

Louisiana Highway 1200 (LA 1200) runs 10.00 miles (16.09 km) in a general north–south direction from the intersection of two local roads in Wilda to a junction with LA 1 in Boyce. The highway is bannered as an east–west route as it intersects two major north–south routes (I-49 and LA 1). With the exception of the portion north of I-49, LA 1200 is currently proposed for deletion as part of La DOTD's Road Transfer Program.

The entire highway is in Rapides Parish.

Location	mi	km	Destinations	Notes
Wilda	0.000	0.000	Begin state maintenance at intersection of Parker Road and Miller Road	Western terminus
Hot Wells	4.103	6.603	LA 121 north – Hot Wells	Western end of LA 121 concurrency
Crane	5.792	9.321	LA 121 south (Hot Wells Road) – Alexandria	Eastern end of LA 121 concurrency
	9.362– 9.602	15.067– 15.453	I-49 west / LA 8 – Alexandria, Shreveport	Exit 99 on I-49; western end of LA 8 concurrency
Boyce	9.783– 9.824	15.744– 15.810	LA 8 east – Colfax	Eastern end of LA 8 concurrency
Boyce	9.998	16.090	LA 1 (Pacific Avenue) – Alexandria, Natchitoches	Eastern terminus
1.000 mi = 1.609 km; 1.000 km = 0.621 mi: Concurrency terminus

== Louisiana Highway 1201 ==
Louisiana Highway 1201
- Location: Hot Wells
- Length: 0.144 mi (232 m)
- Existed: 1955–present

Louisiana Highway 1201 (LA 1201) runs 0.14 miles (0.23 km) in a north–south direction along Alexander Street from Johnson Street to LA 121 in Hot Wells. It is currently proposed for deletion as part of La DOTD's Road Transfer Program.

The entire highway is in Hot Wells, Rapides Parish.

mi	km	Destinations	Notes
0.000	0.000	Begin state maintenance at intersection of Alexander Street and Johnson Street	Southern terminus
0.144	0.232	LA 121 – Alexandria	Northern terminus
1.000 mi = 1.609 km; 1.000 km = 0.621 mi

== Louisiana Highway 1202 ==
Louisiana Highway 1202
- Location: Rapides Parish
- Length: 4.8 mi (7.7 km)
- Existed: 1955–1998

Louisiana Highway 1202 (LA 1202) ran 4.8 miles (7.7 km) in an east–west direction along North Bayou Rapides Road from LA 496 east of McNutt to a second junction with LA 496 at Weil. The route was transferred to local control in 1998.

The entire highway was in Rapides Parish.

Location	mi	km	Destinations	Notes
	0.0	0.0	LA 496 (Hot Wells Road, Bayou Rapides Road)	Western terminus
Weil	4.8	7.7	LA 496 (Bayou Rapides Road)	Eastern terminus
1.000 mi = 1.609 km; 1.000 km = 0.621 mi

== Louisiana Highway 1203 ==
Louisiana Highway 1203
- Location: Pineville
- Length: 4.722 mi (7.599 km)
- Existed: 1955–present

Louisiana Highway 1203 (LA 1203) runs 4.72 miles (7.60 km) in an east–west direction from a local road northwest of Pineville to the US 167 frontage road north of Pineville. It is currently proposed for deletion as part of La DOTD's Road Transfer Program.

The entire route is in Rapides Parish.

mi	km	Destinations	Notes
0.000	0.000	Begin state maintenance on Rigolette Road	Western terminus
3.356– 3.379	5.401– 5.438	US 71 south – Alexandria	Western end of US 71 concurrency
3.394	5.462	US 71 north – Shreveport	Eastern end of US 71 concurrency
4.722	7.599	US 167 Frontage Road	Eastern terminus
1.000 mi = 1.609 km; 1.000 km = 0.621 mi: Concurrency terminus

== Louisiana Highway 1204 ==
Louisiana Highway 1204
- Location: Ball
- Length: 4.004 mi (6.444 km)
- Existed: 1955–present

Louisiana Highway 1204 (LA 1204) runs 4.00 miles (6.44 km) in an east–west direction from LA 3225 in Tioga to LA 623 in Ball. It is currently proposed for deletion as part of La DOTD's Road Transfer Program.

The entire highway is in Rapides Parish.

Location	mi	km	Destinations	Notes
Tioga	0.000	0.000	LA 3225 – Alexandria, Shreveport	Western terminus
Ball	2.725– 2.738	4.385– 4.406	US 165 south – Alexandria	Western end of US 165 concurrency
Ball	2.871– 2.885	4.620– 4.643	US 165 north – Monroe	Eastern end of US 165 concurrency
Ball	4.004	6.444	LA 623 (Camp Livingston Road)	Eastern terminus
1.000 mi = 1.609 km; 1.000 km = 0.621 mi: Concurrency terminus

== Louisiana Highway 1205 ==
Louisiana Highway 1205
- Location: Rapides Parish
- Length: 3.775 mi (6.075 km)
- Existed: 1955–present

Louisiana Highway 1205 (LA 1205) runs 3.78 miles (6.08 km) in an east–west direction along Philadelphia Road from LA 28 at Libuse to a point just beyond Libuse Czech Cemetery. It is currently proposed for deletion as part of La DOTD's Road Transfer Program.

The entire highway is in Rapides Parish.

Location	mi	km	Destinations	Notes
Libuse	0.000	0.000	LA 28 – Pineville, Jonesville	Western terminus
	3.775	6.075	End state maintenance on Philadelphia Road	Eastern terminus
1.000 mi = 1.609 km; 1.000 km = 0.621 mi

== Louisiana Highway 1206 ==
Louisiana Highway 1206
- Location: Rapides Parish
- Length: 7.425 mi (11.949 km)
- Existed: 1955–present

Louisiana Highway 1206 (LA 1206) runs 7.43 miles (11.96 km) in a loop around Deville off of LA 115. It is currently proposed for deletion as part of La DOTD's Road Transfer Program.

The entire highway is in Rapides Parish.

Location	mi	km	Destinations	Notes
Big Island	0.000	0.000	LA 115 – Deville, Marksville	Southern terminus
	2.911– 3.070	4.685– 4.941	LA 1207	Eastern terminus of LA 1207
	7.425	11.949	LA 115 – Deville, Buckeye	Northern terminus
1.000 mi = 1.609 km; 1.000 km = 0.621 mi

== Louisiana Highway 1207 ==
Louisiana Highway 1207
- Location: Rapides Parish
- Length: 6.858 mi (11.037 km)
- Existed: 1955–present

Louisiana Highway 1207 (LA 1207) runs 6.86 miles (11.04 km) in an east–west direction from LA 28 in Holloway to LA 1206 east of Deville. It is currently proposed for deletion as part of La DOTD's Road Transfer Program.

The entire highway is in Rapides Parish.

Location	mi	km	Destinations	Notes
Holloway	0.000	0.000	LA 28 – Pineville, Jonesville	Western terminus
Deville	4.617– 4.681	7.430– 7.533	LA 115 – Marksville	
	6.735– 6.858	10.839– 11.037	LA 1206	Eastern terminus
1.000 mi = 1.609 km; 1.000 km = 0.621 mi

== Louisiana Highway 1208 ==
Louisiana Highway 1208
- Location: Alexandria
- Length: 7.717 mi (12.419 km)
- Existed: 1955–present

Louisiana Highway 1208 (LA 1208) consists of five road segments with a total length of 7.72 miles (12.42 km) that are located in the Rapides Parish city of Alexandria. All existing segments, with the exception of LA 1208-2, are proposed for deletion as part of La DOTD's Road Transfer Program.

- LA 1208-1 runs 1.804 miles (2.903 km) along Willow Glen Road from the I-49 frontage road to LA 1 (3rd Street).
- LA 1208-2 runs 0.443 miles (0.713 km) along Sterkx Road from Horseshoe Drive to US 71 (MacArthur Drive).
- LA 1208-3 runs 3.570 miles (5.745 km) along Jackson Street from LA 488 (Twin Bridges Road) to the junction of US 165 Bus., LA 1, and LA 28 Bus. at Bolton Avenue.
- LA 1208-4 runs 1.688 miles (2.717 km) along the US 71 frontage road from Old Baton Rouge Highway to Richland Road, continuing onto Eddie Williams Avenue to its intersection with Hudson Boulevard.
- LA 1208-5 runs 0.212 miles (0.341 km) along Masonic Drive from the junction of US 71 and US 165 at Masonic Circle to an intersection with the Masonic Drive frontage roads.

Routes deleted since the 1955 Louisiana Highway renumbering include:

- LA 1208-4 formerly ran 1.70 miles (2.74 km) through Alexandria. It traveled along the one-way pair of 2nd and 4th Streets from LA 1 (Winn Street) to Scott Street, then along Third Street and North Third Street to a junction with US 71/US 165 (MacArthur Drive). The route was transferred to local control in 2006, and its designation was given to the current route in 2010.
- LA 1208-5 formerly ran 0.30 miles (0.48 km) along Shamrock Street from the Pineville western city limits to a junction with US 165/LA 28 (Main Street) within the city limits. The route was transferred to local control by 1958, and its designation was given to the current route in 2010.
- LA 1208-6 ran 0.50 miles (0.80 km) along Baywood Drive in Pineville from US 165 Byp. to mainline US 165 (Military Highway). The route was transferred to local control by 1958.

== Louisiana Highway 1209 ==
Louisiana Highway 1209
- Location: Zachary
- Length: 2.439 mi (3.925 km)
- Existed: 1955–2021

Louisiana Highway 1209 (LA 1209) ran 2.44 miles (3.93 km) in a north–south direction from a local road to a junction with LA 19 in Zachary. In 2021, LA 1209 was removed from the state highway system and transferred to local control.

The entire highway was in Zachary, East Baton Rouge Parish.

mi	km	Destinations	Notes
0.000	0.000	Begin state maintenance on Baker Avenue	Southern terminus
0.978	1.574	LA 64 west (High Street)	Southern end of LA 64 concurrency
1.149	1.849	LA 64 east (Main Street)	Northern end of LA 64 concurrency
2.439	3.925	LA 19 (Zachary-Slaughter Highway)	Northern terminus
1.000 mi = 1.609 km; 1.000 km = 0.621 mi: Concurrency terminus

== Louisiana Highway 1210 ==
Louisiana Highway 1210
- Location: Crowley
- Length: 1.0 mi (1.6 km)
- Existed: 1955–c. 1957

Louisiana Highway 1210 (LA 1210) ran 1.0 mile (1.6 km) in an east–west direction from LA 13 south of Crowley to a local road southeast of Crowley. The route was transferred to local control by 1958.

The entire route was in Acadia Parish.

mi	km	Destinations	Notes
0.0	0.0	LA 13 – Crowley, Kaplan	Western terminus
1.0	1.6	End state maintenance	Eastern terminus
1.000 mi = 1.609 km; 1.000 km = 0.621 mi

== Louisiana Highway 1211 ==
Louisiana Highway 1211
- Location: New Llano
- Length: 4.837 mi (7.784 km)
- Existed: 1955–present

Louisiana Highway 1211 (LA 1211) runs 4.84 miles (7.79 km) in a southwest to northeast direction from a local road southwest of New Llano to a junction with US 171 in New Llano. The route is bannered north–south, and its mileposts increase from the northern end contrary to common practice. LA 1211 is currently proposed for deletion as part of La DOTD's Road Transfer Program.

The entire highway is in Vernon Parish.

Location	mi	km	Destinations	Notes
	4.837	7.784	Begin state maintenance on Savage Forks Road	Southern terminus
New Llano	0.012– 0.000	0.019– 0.000	US 171 (Main Street)	Northern terminus
1.000 mi = 1.609 km; 1.000 km = 0.621 mi

== Louisiana Highway 1212 ==
Louisiana Highway 1212
- Location: Leesville
- Length: 2.09 mi (3.36 km)
- Existed: 1955–2006

Louisiana Highway 1212 (LA 1212) ran 2.09 miles (3.36 km) in a north–south direction from US 171 to LA 8 in Leesville. The route was transferred to local control in 2006.

The entire highway was in Leesville, Vernon Parish.

mi	km	Destinations	Notes
0.00	0.00	US 171 (South 5th Street)	Southern terminus
2.09	3.36	LA 8 (Nolan Trace Parkway)	Northern terminus
1.000 mi = 1.609 km; 1.000 km = 0.621 mi

== Louisiana Highway 1213 ==
Louisiana Highway 1213
- Location: Leesville
- Length: 0.460 mi (740 m)
- Existed: 1955–present

Louisiana Highway 1213 (LA 1213) runs 0.46 miles (0.74 km) in a north–south direction along Kurthwood Road from US 171 to the junction of LA 8/LA 28 and LA 117 in Leesville. It is currently proposed for deletion as part of La DOTD's Road Transfer Program.

The entire highway is in Leesville, Vernon Parish.

mi	km	Destinations	Notes
0.000– 0.101	0.000– 0.163	US 171 (North 5th Street, North 6th Street)	Southern terminus; one-way pair
0.460	0.740	LA 8 / LA 28 (Alexandria Highway) – Alexandria LA 117 north (Kurthwood Road) – Kurthwood, Hagewood	Southern terminus of LA 117; northern terminus of LA 1213; no access across LA 8/LA 28
1.000 mi = 1.609 km; 1.000 km = 0.621 mi

== Louisiana Highway 1214 ==
Louisiana Highway 1214
- Location: Vernon Parish
- Length: 4.0 mi (6.4 km)
- Existed: 1955–1975

Louisiana Highway 1214 (LA 1214) ran 4.0 miles (6.4 km) in an east–west direction from LA 8 in Slagle to LA 28 east of Slagle. The route became part of LA 121 in 1975.

The entire highway was in Vernon Parish.

Location	mi	km	Destinations	Notes
Slagle	0.0	0.0	LA 8 – Leesville, Simpson	Western terminus
	4.0	6.4	LA 28 – Leesville, Alexandria	Eastern terminus
1.000 mi = 1.609 km; 1.000 km = 0.621 mi

== Louisiana Highway 1215 ==
Louisiana Highway 1215
- Location: Sabine Parish
- Length: 4.035 mi (6.494 km)
- Existed: 1955–present

Louisiana Highway 1215 (LA 1215) runs 4.04 miles (6.50 km) in an east–west direction from a dead end at the Toledo Bend Reservoir to a junction with LA 191 south of Zwolle. It is currently proposed for deletion as part of La DOTD's Road Transfer Program.

The entire route is in Sabine Parish.

mi	km	Destinations	Notes
0.000	0.000	Dead end at Toledo Bend Reservoir	Western terminus
4.035	6.494	LA 191 – Zwolle	Eastern terminus
1.000 mi = 1.609 km; 1.000 km = 0.621 mi

== Louisiana Highway 1216 ==
Louisiana Highway 1216
- Location: Zwolle
- Length: 9.024 mi (14.523 km)
- Existed: 1955–present

Louisiana Highway 1216 (LA 1216) runs 9.02 miles (14.52 km) in an east–west direction from US 171 in Zwolle to LA 175 north of Many. It is currently proposed for deletion as part of La DOTD's Road Transfer Program.

The entire highway is in Sabine Parish.

Location	mi	km	Destinations	Notes
Zwolle	0.000– 0.018	0.000– 0.029	US 171 – Leesville, Shreveport	Western terminus
	9.024	14.523	LA 175 – Many, Pleasant Hill	Eastern terminus
1.000 mi = 1.609 km; 1.000 km = 0.621 mi

== Louisiana Highway 1217 ==
Louisiana Highway 1217
- Location: Many
- Length: 5.294 mi (8.520 km)
- Existed: 1955–present

Louisiana Highway 1217 (LA 1217) runs 5.29 miles (8.51 km) in a north–south direction along Marthaville Road from LA 6 in Many to a local road north of Many. It is currently proposed for deletion as part of La DOTD's Road Transfer Program.

The entire highway is in Sabine Parish.

Location	mi	km	Destinations	Notes
Many	0.000	0.000	LA 6 (San Antonio Avenue)	Southern terminus
	5.294	8.520	End state maintenance at intersection of Marthaville Road and Patton Road	Northern terminus
1.000 mi = 1.609 km; 1.000 km = 0.621 mi

== Louisiana Highway 1218 ==
Louisiana Highway 1218
- Location: Noble
- Length: 2.809 mi (4.521 km)
- Existed: 1955–present

Louisiana Highway 1218 (LA 1218) runs 2.81 miles (4.52 km) in an east–west direction from LA 191 west of Noble to US 171 in Noble. The route is bannered east–west, and its mileposts increase from the eastern end contrary to common practice. LA 1218 is currently proposed for deletion as part of La DOTD's Road Transfer Program.

The entire highway is in Sabine Parish.

Location	mi	km	Destinations	Notes
	2.809	4.521	LA 191 – Zwolle, Logansport	Western terminus
Noble	0.016– 0.000	0.026– 0.000	US 171 – Zwolle, Shreveport	Eastern terminus
1.000 mi = 1.609 km; 1.000 km = 0.621 mi

== Louisiana Highway 1219 ==
Louisiana Highway 1219
- Location: Sabine Parish
- Length: 8.2 mi (13.2 km)
- Existed: 1955–1981

Louisiana Highway 1219 (LA 1219) ran 8.2 miles (13.2 km) in a north–south direction from LA 1218 west of Noble to LA 174 west of Converse. The route became part of LA 191 in 1981.

The entire route was in Sabine Parish.

mi	km	Destinations	Notes
0.0	0.0	LA 1218 – Noble	Southern terminus of LA 1219; western terminus of LA 1218
8.2	13.2	LA 174 – Converse, Logansport	Northern terminus
1.000 mi = 1.609 km; 1.000 km = 0.621 mi

== Louisiana Highway 1220 ==
Louisiana Highway 1220
- Location: Bermuda
- Length: 2.902 mi (4.670 km)
- Existed: 1955–present

Louisiana Highway 1220 (LA 1220) runs 2.90 miles (4.67 km) in an east–west direction from LA 119 in Bermuda to a local road southeast of Bermuda. It is currently proposed for deletion as part of La DOTD's Road Transfer Program.

The entire highway is in Natchitoches Parish.

Location	mi	km	Destinations	Notes
Bermuda	0.000	0.000	LA 119 – Natchez, Melrose	Western terminus
	2.902	4.670	End state maintenance at eastern end of Little River bridge	Eastern terminus
1.000 mi = 1.609 km; 1.000 km = 0.621 mi

== Louisiana Highway 1221 ==
Louisiana Highway 1221
- Location: Bethany
- Length: 3.883 mi (6.249 km)
- Existed: 1955–present

Louisiana Highway 1221 (LA 1221) runs 3.88 miles (6.24 km) in a north–south direction from LA 120 in Bethany to the intersection of two local roads north of Bethany. With the exception of the southern portion serving the Rebel State Historic Site, LA 1221 is proposed for deletion as part of La DOTD's Road Transfer Program.

The entire highway is in Natchitoches Parish.

Location	mi	km	Destinations	Notes
Bethany	0.000	0.000	LA 120 – Marthaville, Belmont	Southern terminus
	3.883	6.249	End state maintenance at intersection of Bethany Highway Extension and Leo Jennings Road	Northern terminus
1.000 mi = 1.609 km; 1.000 km = 0.621 mi

== Louisiana Highway 1222 ==
Louisiana Highway 1222
- Location: Natchitoches Parish
- Length: 2.208 mi (3.553 km)
- Existed: 1955–present

Louisiana Highway 1222 (LA 1222) runs 2.21 miles (3.56 km) in a southwest to northeast direction from LA 485 to a local road northeast of Robeline. The route is bannered east–west. It is currently proposed for deletion as part of La DOTD's Road Transfer Program.

The entire route is in Natchitoches Parish.

mi	km	Destinations	Notes
0.000	0.000	LA 485	Western terminus
2.208	3.553	End state maintenance on Posey Road	Eastern terminus
1.000 mi = 1.609 km; 1.000 km = 0.621 mi

== Louisiana Highway 1223 ==
Louisiana Highway 1223
- Location: Natchitoches
- Length: 1.143 mi (1.839 km)
- Existed: 1955–present

Louisiana Highway 1223 (LA 1223) runs 1.14 miles (1.83 km) in a north–south direction from LA 1 Bus. to LA 6 Bus. in Natchitoches. It is currently proposed for deletion as part of La DOTD's Road Transfer Program.

The entire highway is in Natchitoches, Natchitoches Parish.

mi	km	Destinations	Notes
0.000	0.000	LA 1 Bus. (South Drive)	Southern terminus
1.128– 1.143	1.815– 1.839	LA 6 Bus. (University Parkway, Jefferson Street)	Northern terminus; to Fort St. Jean Baptiste State Historic Site
1.000 mi = 1.609 km; 1.000 km = 0.621 mi

== Louisiana Highway 1224 ==
Louisiana Highway 1224
- Location: Natchitoches
- Length: 2.033 mi (3.272 km)
- Existed: 1955–present

Louisiana Highway 1224 (LA 1224) runs 2.03 miles (3.27 km) in a southwest to northeast direction along Williams Avenue from LA 1 Bus. to Blanchard Road in Natchitoches. The route is bannered east–west. It is currently proposed for deletion as part of La DOTD's Road Transfer Program.

The entire highway is in Natchitoches, Natchitoches Parish.

mi	km	Destinations	Notes
0.000	0.000	LA 1 Bus. (Williams Avenue, Church Street)	Western terminus
2.033	3.272	End state maintenance at intersection of Williams Avenue and Blanchard Road	Eastern terminus
1.000 mi = 1.609 km; 1.000 km = 0.621 mi

== Louisiana Highway 1225 ==
Louisiana Highway 1225
- Location: Luella–Clarence
- Length: 4.231 mi (6.809 km)
- Existed: 1955–present

Louisiana Highway 1225 (LA 1225) runs 4.23 miles (6.81 km) in a north–south direction from US 71 at Luella to LA 6 in Clarence. It is currently proposed for deletion as part of La DOTD's Road Transfer Program.

The entire highway is in Natchitoches Parish.

Location	mi	km	Destinations	Notes
Luella	0.000	0.000	US 71 – Alexandria, Shreveport	Southern terminus
	2.354	3.788	LA 1226 east	Western terminus of LA 1226
Clarence	4.231	6.809	LA 6 – Natchitoches, Many	Northern terminus
1.000 mi = 1.609 km; 1.000 km = 0.621 mi

== Louisiana Highway 1226 ==
Louisiana Highway 1226
- Location: Natchitoches Parish
- Length: 9.328 mi (15.012 km)
- Existed: 1955–present

Louisiana Highway 1226 (LA 1226) runs 9.33 miles (15.02 km) in a southwest to northeast direction from LA 1225 south of Clarence to the intersection of two local roads northeast of Clarence. The route is bannered east–west. It is currently proposed for deletion as part of La DOTD's Road Transfer Program.

The entire highway is in Natchitoches Parish.

Location	mi	km	Destinations	Notes
	0.000	0.000	LA 1225	Western terminus
Irma	0.635	1.022	US 71 – Alexandria, Shreveport	
Trichell	3.690	5.938	US 84 – Clarence, Winnfield	
	6.367	10.247	LA 1227 south	Western terminus of LA 1227
	9.328	15.012	End state maintenance at intersection of Goldonna Road, Trichel Camp Road, and Mammy Trail	Eastern terminus
1.000 mi = 1.609 km; 1.000 km = 0.621 mi

== Louisiana Highway 1227 ==
Louisiana Highway 1227
- Location: Natchitoches Parish
- Length: 0.611 mi (983 m)
- Existed: 1955–present

Louisiana Highway 1227 (LA 1227) runs 0.61 miles (0.98 km) in an east–west direction from LA 1226 to a dead end at Saline Bayou northeast of Clarence. The route is bannered north–south despite its geographic direction. It is currently proposed for deletion as part of La DOTD's Road Transfer Program.

The entire route is in Natchitoches Parish.

mi	km	Destinations	Notes
0.000	0.000	LA 1226	Western terminus
0.611	0.983	Dead end at Saline Bayou	Eastern terminus
1.000 mi = 1.609 km; 1.000 km = 0.621 mi

== Louisiana Highway 1228 ==
Louisiana Highway 1228
- Location: Winn Parish
- Length: 10.289 mi (16.559 km)
- Existed: 1955–present

Louisiana Highway 1228 (LA 1228) runs 10.29 miles (16.56 km) in a north–south direction from a local road southeast of Atlanta to a junction with US 84 west of Winnfield. The route is bannered east–west despite its geographic direction. It is currently proposed for deletion as part of La DOTD's Road Transfer Program.

The entire highway is in Winn Parish.

Location	mi	km	Destinations	Notes
	0.000	0.000	End state maintenance at Buddy Taylor Road	Southern terminus
Sardis	5.209	8.383	LA 34 west – Atlanta	Southern end of LA 34 concurrency
	6.096	9.811	LA 34 east – Winnfield	Northern end of LA 34 concurrency
	10.289	16.559	US 84 – Winnfield, Natchitoches	Northern terminus
1.000 mi = 1.609 km; 1.000 km = 0.621 mi: Concurrency terminus

== Louisiana Highway 1229 ==
Louisiana Highway 1229
- Location: Winn Parish
- Length: 2.058 mi (3.312 km)
- Existed: 1955–present

Louisiana Highway 1229 (LA 1229) runs 2.06 miles (3.32 km) in a southeast to northwest direction from LA 34 to a point on Parish Road 775 north of Atlanta. The route is bannered north–south. It is currently proposed for deletion as part of La DOTD's Road Transfer Program.

The entire route is in Winn Parish.

mi	km	Destinations	Notes
0.000	0.000	LA 34 – Atlanta, Winnfield	Southern terminus
2.058	3.312	PR 775	Northern terminus
1.000 mi = 1.609 km; 1.000 km = 0.621 mi

== Louisiana Highway 1230 ==
Louisiana Highway 1230
- Location: Zion–Georgetown
- Length: 7.581 mi (12.200 km)
- Existed: 1955–present

Louisiana Highway 1230 (LA 1230) runs 7.58 miles (12.20 km) in an east–west direction from LA 472 north of Zion to LA 500 in Georgetown.

The route heads due east from LA 472 along the Grant–Winn parish line. After 4.6 miles (7.4 km), LA 1230 turns south at a T-intersection with LA 3098 into Grant Parish. A short distance later, the highway curves to the southeast and proceeds into the village of Georgetown. Here, LA 1230 intersects LA 3098 for a second time then zigzags across the Union Pacific Railroad (UP) tracks. A ramp provides access to southbound US 165, which crosses over the rail line en route to Alexandria. Immediately after passing under the US 165 overpass, LA 1230 reaches its terminus at a junction with LA 500 opposite Lee Street. LA 1230 is an undivided two-lane highway for its entire length.

Prior to the 1955 Louisiana Highway renumbering, LA 1230 was designated as State Route 619. The entire route is currently proposed for deletion as part of La DOTD's Road Transfer Program.

Parish	Location	mi	km	Destinations	Notes
Grant–Winn parish line		0.000	0.000	LA 472	Western terminus
Grant–Winn parish line		4.626	7.445	LA 3098	Western terminus of LA 3098
Grant	Georgetown	7.234	11.642	LA 3098	
Grant	Georgetown	7.505	12.078	To US 165 south – Alexandria	
Grant	Georgetown	7.581	12.200	LA 500 north to US 165 – Monroe	Eastern terminus
1.000 mi = 1.609 km; 1.000 km = 0.621 mi

== Louisiana Highway 1231 ==
Louisiana Highway 1231
- Location: Winnfield
- Length: 5.973 mi (9.613 km)
- Existed: 1955–present

Louisiana Highway 1231 (LA 1231) consists of two road segments with a total length of 5.97 miles (9.61 km) that are located in the Winn Parish city of Winnfield. A third segment was deleted following the 1955 Louisiana Highway renumbering. Both extant segments are currently proposed for deletion as part of La DOTD's Road Transfer Program.

- LA 1231-1 runs 1.975 miles (3.178 km) from a point on Cedar Drive south of the city limits to the junction of US 84/US 167/LA 34 (East Lafayette Street) and LA 1231-2 (South Grove Street) within the city limits.
- LA 1231-2 runs 3.998 miles (6.434 km) from the junction of US 84/US 167/LA 34 (East Lafayette Street) and LA 1231-1 (South Grove Street) within the city limits to a second junction with US 167 north of the city limits.
- LA 1231-3 ran 1.2 miles (1.9 km) from the junction of US 84/US 167 and LA 34 at West Court and South Jones Streets to a second junction with US 84 and LA 34 at East Boundary Avenue and Maple Street. The route was transferred to local control by 1958.

== Louisiana Highway 1232 ==
Louisiana Highway 1232
- Location: Winn Parish
- Length: 7.313 mi (11.769 km)
- Existed: 1955–present

Louisiana Highway 1232 (LA 1232) runs 7.31 miles (11.76 km) in a southeast to northwest direction from LA 501 north of Calvin to LA 156 north of Winnfield. The route is bannered east–west, and its mileposts increase from the eastern end contrary to common practice. LA 1232 is currently proposed for deletion as part of La DOTD's Road Transfer Program.

The entire route is in Winn Parish.

mi	km	Destinations	Notes
7.313	11.769	LA 501	Western terminus
0.000	0.000	LA 156 – Winnfield, Calvin	Eastern terminus
1.000 mi = 1.609 km; 1.000 km = 0.621 mi

== Louisiana Highway 1233 ==
Louisiana Highway 1233
- Location: Winn Parish
- Length: 9.603 mi (15.455 km)
- Existed: 1955–present

Louisiana Highway 1233 (LA 1233) runs 9.60 miles (15.45 km) in a north–south direction from LA 156 east of Goldonna to LA 126 at Pine Ridge.

The entire highway is in Winn Parish.

Location	mi	km	Destinations	Notes
	0.000	0.000	LA 156 – Goldonna, Calvin	Southern terminus
Pine Ridge	9.603	15.455	LA 126 – Readhimer, Dodson	Northern terminus
1.000 mi = 1.609 km; 1.000 km = 0.621 mi

== Louisiana Highway 1234 ==
Louisiana Highway 1234
- Location: Winn Parish
- Length: 3.540 mi (5.697 km)
- Existed: 1955–present

Louisiana Highway 1234 (LA 1234) runs 3.54 miles (5.70 km) in a southeast to northwest direction from LA 505 in Gansville to LA 126 west of Dodson. The route is bannered east–west, and its mileposts increase from the eastern end contrary to common practice. LA 1234 is currently proposed for deletion as part of La DOTD's Road Transfer Program.

The entire highway is in Winn Parish.

Location	mi	km	Destinations	Notes
Gansville	3.540	5.697	LA 505	Western terminus
	0.000	0.000	LA 126 – Readhimer, Dodson	Eastern terminus
1.000 mi = 1.609 km; 1.000 km = 0.621 mi

== Louisiana Highway 1235 ==
Louisiana Highway 1235
- Location: Dodson
- Length: 3.415 mi (5.496 km)
- Existed: 1955–present

Louisiana Highway 1235 (LA 1235) runs 3.42 miles (5.50 km) in a north–south direction from LA 126 in Dodson to the intersection of two local roads northeast of Dodson. It is currently proposed for deletion as part of La DOTD's Road Transfer Program.

The entire highway is in Winn Parish.

Location	mi	km	Destinations	Notes
Dodson	0.000	0.000	LA 126 (Stovall Street)	Southern terminus
	3.415	5.496	End state maintenance at intersection of Transport Road and Braxton Road	Northern terminus
1.000 mi = 1.609 km; 1.000 km = 0.621 mi

== Louisiana Highway 1236 ==
Louisiana Highway 1236
- Location: Winn Parish
- Length: 4.769 mi (7.675 km)
- Existed: 1955–present

Louisiana Highway 1236 (LA 1236) runs 4.77 miles (7.68 km) in an east–west direction from US 167 south of Dodson to LA 34 southeast of Dodson. It is currently proposed for deletion as part of La DOTD's Road Transfer Program.

The entire route is in Winn Parish.

mi	km	Destinations	Notes
0.000– 0.026	0.000– 0.042	US 167 – Winnfield, Jonesboro	Western terminus
4.769	7.675	LA 34 – Winnfield, Monroe	Eastern terminus
1.000 mi = 1.609 km; 1.000 km = 0.621 mi

== Louisiana Highway 1237 ==
Louisiana Highway 1237
- Location: Sikes
- Length: 1.188 mi (1.912 km)
- Existed: 1955–present

Louisiana Highway 1237 (LA 1237) runs 1.19 miles (1.92 km) in a northeast to southwest direction from a point on Jake Creel Road southwest of Sikes to the junction of LA 126 and LA 499 in Sikes. The route is bannered north–south, and its mileposts increase from the northern end contrary to common practice. LA 1237 is currently proposed for deletion as part of La DOTD's Road Transfer Program.

The entire highway is in Winn Parish.

Location	mi	km	Destinations	Notes
	1.188	1.912	Begin state maintenance on Jake Creel Road	Southern terminus
Sikes	0.000	0.000	LA 126 / LA 499 south (4th Avenue) LA 499 north (Front Street)	Northern terminus
1.000 mi = 1.609 km; 1.000 km = 0.621 mi

== Louisiana Highway 1238 ==
Louisiana Highway 1238
- Location: Winn Parish
- Length: 2.694 mi (4.336 km)
- Existed: 1955–present

Louisiana Highway 1238 (LA 1238) runs 2.69 miles (4.33 km) in a north–south direction from the intersection of two local roads at Flat Creek to LA 127 southeast of Hickory Valley. The route's mileposts increase from the northern end contrary to common practice. LA 1238 is currently proposed for deletion as part of La DOTD's Road Transfer Program.LA 1238 was also an unpaved state highway until the 2010s.

The entire highway is in Winn Parish.

Location	mi	km	Destinations	Notes
Flat Creek	2.694	4.336	Begin state maintenance at intersection of Beech Creek Church Road and Weatherford Road	Southern terminus
	0.000	0.000	LA 127 – Sikes, Olla	Northern terminus
1.000 mi = 1.609 km; 1.000 km = 0.621 mi

== Louisiana Highway 1239 ==
Louisiana Highway 1239
- Location: Montgomery
- Length: 1.345 mi (2.165 km)
- Existed: 1955–present

Louisiana Highway 1239 (LA 1239) consists of two road segments with a total length of 1.35 miles (2.17 km) that are located in the Grant Parish town of Montgomery. Both segments are proposed for deletion as part of La DOTD's Road Transfer Program.

- LA 1239-1 runs 1.046 miles (1.683 km) along Old Jefferson Highway from Creola Street to the junction of US 71 (Euclid Street) and LA 122. The western portion of the route formerly connected the town of Montgomery with a ferry across the Red River and was designated as State Route 1105 prior to the 1955 Louisiana Highway renumbering. The portion east of Woodland Street was once part of the Jefferson Highway auto trail and the original State Route 1, the predecessor of US 71 through the area. After the highway was re-routed through town in the 1930s to eliminate two railroad crossings, the original alignment became State Route 1-D for a time prior to the 1955 renumbering.
- LA 1239-2 runs 0.299 miles (0.481 km) along Caddo Street from LA 1239-1 (Old Jefferson Highway) to the junction of US 71 (Euclid Street) and LA 34 (Mulberry Street). It served as the eastern portion of State Route 1105 prior to the 1955 renumbering.

== Louisiana Highway 1240 ==
Louisiana Highway 1240
- Location: Grant Parish
- Length: 7.478 mi (12.035 km)
- Existed: 1955–present

Louisiana Highway 1240 (LA 1240) runs 7.48 miles (12.04 km) in a north–south direction from US 71 northwest of Aloha to LA 122 in Verda. It is an undivided two-lane highway for its entire length.

The route heads north from a point on US 71 between Colfax and Montgomery and passes alongside Nantachie Lake. It proceeds through a heavily wooded area until reaching its terminus at LA 122 in Verda.

Prior to the 1955 Louisiana Highway renumbering, LA 1240 was designated as State Route C-1432. It is currently proposed for deletion as part of La DOTD's Road Transfer Program.

The entire highway is in Grant Parish.

Location	mi	km	Destinations	Notes
	0.000	0.000	US 71 – Colfax, Montgomery	Southern terminus
Verda	7.478	12.035	LA 122 – Montgomery, Dry Prong	Northern terminus
1.000 mi = 1.609 km; 1.000 km = 0.621 mi

== Louisiana Highway 1241 ==
Louisiana Highway 1241
- Location: Grant Parish
- Length: 4.794 mi (7.715 km)
- Existed: 1955–present

Louisiana Highway 1241 (LA 1241) runs 4.79 miles (7.71 km) in an east–west direction from US 71 southeast of Rock Hill to US 167 in Prospect. It is currently proposed for deletion as part of La DOTD's Road Transfer Program.

The entire highway is in Grant Parish.

Location	mi	km	Destinations	Notes
	0.000	0.000	US 71 – Alexandria, Colfax	Western terminus
Prospect	4.777– 4.794	7.688– 7.715	US 167 – Alexandria, Winnfield	Eastern terminus
1.000 mi = 1.609 km; 1.000 km = 0.621 mi

== Louisiana Highway 1242 ==
Louisiana Highway 1242
- Location: Chase
- Length: 0.198 mi (319 m)
- Existed: 1998–present

Louisiana Highway 1242 (LA 1242) runs 0.20 miles (0.32 km) in an east–west direction off of LA 3210 in Chase. The route consists of a state-maintained access road to the Louisiana Department of Transportation and Development's District 58 headquarters. It is an undivided two-lane highway for its entire length.

LA 1242 heads east on Willie Hill Road from a point on LA 3210 immediately east of its junction with the concurrent US 425/LA 15. After passing the La DOTD facility, the LA 1242 designation ends as the road transitions from state to parish maintenance.

The entire highway is in Chase, Franklin Parish.

mi	km	Destinations	Notes
0.000	0.000	LA 3210	Western terminus
0.198	0.319	End state maintenance on Willie Hill Road	Eastern terminus
1.000 mi = 1.609 km; 1.000 km = 0.621 mi

== Louisiana Highway 1243 ==
Louisiana Highway 1243
- Location: Alexandria
- Length: 3.253 mi (5.235 km)
- Existed: 1998–present

Louisiana Highway 1243 (LA 1243) runs 3.25 miles (5.23 km) in a north–south direction along McKeithen Drive from LA 488 southwest of Alexandria to LA 28 in Alexandria. It is currently proposed for deletion as part of La DOTD's Road Transfer Program.

The entire highway is in Rapides Parish.

Location	mi	km	Destinations	Notes
	0.000	0.000	LA 488 (Twin Bridges Road)	Southern terminus
Alexandria	3.237– 3.253	5.209– 5.235	LA 28 (Coliseum Boulevard) – Alexandria, Leesville	Northern terminus
1.000 mi = 1.609 km; 1.000 km = 0.621 mi

== Louisiana Highway 1244 ==
Louisiana Highway 1244
- Location: Opelousas
- Length: 0.77 mi (1,240 m)
- Existed: 1998–2003

Louisiana Highway 1244 (LA 1244) ran 0.77 miles (1.24 km) in a southeast to northwest direction from LA 31 to the I-49 frontage road in Opelousas. The route was part of LA 31 prior to 1998 and was transferred to local control in 2003.

The entire highway was in Opelousas, St. Landry Parish.

mi	km	Destinations	Notes
0.00	0.00	LA 31 – Opelousas, Leonville	Southern terminus
0.77	1.24	I-49 Frontage Road	Northern terminus
1.000 mi = 1.609 km; 1.000 km = 0.621 mi

== Louisiana Highway 1245 ==
Louisiana Highway 1245
- Location: St. Bernard Parish
- Length: 0.430 mi (692 m)
- Existed: 2002–present

Louisiana Highway 1245 (LA 1245) runs 0.43 miles (0.69 km) in a north–south direction along Access Road from LA 300 to LA 46 east of Poydras. The route's mileposts increase from its northern end contrary to common practice.

LA 1245 is a short connector located in an unincorporated area of St. Bernard Parish east of Poydras and Sebastopol. The route heads north along Leon Road from LA 300 (Bayou Road) and proceeds to a junction with the parallel LA 46. It is an undivided two-lane highway for its entire length.

LA 1245 was constructed as a new addition to the state highway system in 2002. It was designed to provide truck traffic from the area's industrial plants with a safer connection to LA 46 than the narrow and winding LA 300.

The entire highway is in St. Bernard Parish.

Location	mi	km	Destinations	Notes
Toca	0.430	0.692	LA 300 (Bayou Road)	Southern terminus
	0.013– 0.000	0.021– 0.000	LA 46 – Chalmette, Yscloskey	Northern terminus
1.000 mi = 1.609 km; 1.000 km = 0.621 mi

== Louisiana Highway 1246 ==
Louisiana Highway 1246
- Location: Vermilion Parish
- Length: 0.247 mi (398 m)
- Existed: 1998–present

Louisiana Highway 1246 (LA 1246) runs 0.25 miles (0.40 km) in an east–west direction along Lulu Road from Woodlawn Road to LA 82 north of Abbeville. The route consists of the state-maintained Woodlawn Bridge, a swing bridge spanning the Vermilion River, and its approaches. It is an undivided two-lane highway for its entire length, and its mileposts increase from the eastern end contrary to common practice. LA 1246 is currently proposed for deletion as part of La DOTD's Road Transfer Program.

The entire route is in Vermilion Parish.

mi	km	Destinations	Notes
0.247	0.398	Begin state maintenance at intersection of Lulu Road and Woodlawn Road	Western terminus
0.160– 0.090	0.257– 0.145	Woodlawn Bridge over Vermilion River	
0.000	0.000	LA 82	Eastern terminus
1.000 mi = 1.609 km; 1.000 km = 0.621 mi

== Louisiana Highway 1247 ==
Louisiana Highway 1247
- Location: Labadieville
- Length: 1.587 mi (2.554 km)
- Existed: 1999–present

Louisiana Highway 1247 (LA 1247) runs 1.59 miles (2.56 km) in a northeast to southwest direction from LA 1010 at Brule to LA 308 in Labadieville. The route's mileposts increase from the northern or eastern end contrary to common practice. LA 1247 was formerly part of LA 398, and it is currently proposed for deletion as part of La DOTD's Road Transfer Program. As of 2019, it is under agreement to be removed from the state highway system and transferred to local control.

The entire highway is in Assumption Parish.

Location	mi	km	Destinations	Notes
Brule	1.587	2.554	LA 1010	Western terminus
Labadieville	0.113	0.182	LA 1 south – Thibodaux	Western end of LA 1 concurrency
Labadieville	0.087	0.140	LA 1 north – Napoleonville	Eastern end of LA 1 concurrency
Labadieville	0.078– 0.037	0.126– 0.060	Bridge over Bayou Lafourche	
Labadieville	0.000	0.000	LA 308	Eastern terminus
1.000 mi = 1.609 km; 1.000 km = 0.621 mi: Concurrency terminus

== Louisiana Highway 1248 ==
Louisiana Highway 1248
- Location: Baton Rouge
- Length: 5.914 mi (9.518 km)
- Existed: 2001–2020

Louisiana Highway 1248 (LA 1248) runs 5.91 miles (9.51 km) in a general north–south direction along Bluebonnet Boulevard from LA 30 to I-10 in Baton Rouge. In 2020, the route was removed from the state highway system and transferred to local control. Although the route has been decommissioned, signage still remains on I-10 for exit 162A.

The entire route was in East Baton Rouge Parish.

mi	km	Destinations	Notes	
	0.000	0.000	LA 30 (Nicholson Drive)	Southern terminus
	2.513– 2.521	4.044– 4.057	LA 42 (Burbank Drive)	
	4.402	7.084	LA 427 (Perkins Road)	
Baton Rouge	5.669– 5.827	9.123– 9.378	I-10 – Baton Rouge, New Orleans	Exit 162A on I-10
Baton Rouge	5.914	9.518	End state maintenance on Bluebonnet Boulevard	Northern terminus
1.000 mi = 1.609 km; 1.000 km = 0.621 mi

== Louisiana Highway 1249 ==
Louisiana Highway 1249
- Location: Tangipahoa Parish
- Length: 3.455 mi (5.560 km)
- Existed: 2000–present

Louisiana Highway 1249 (LA 1249) runs 3.46 miles (5.57 km) in a north–south direction from LA 22 east of Springfield to LA 1040 west of Hammond. It is currently proposed for deletion as part of La DOTD's Road Transfer Program.

The route begins at a point on LA 22 in Tangipahoa Parish just across the Livingston Parish line from Springfield. It proceeds north along Pumpkin Center Road through the community of Pumpkin Center and passes through an interchange with I-12 at Exit 35. The route continues north a short distance further to a junction with LA 1040 (Old Baton Rouge Highway). LA 1249 is an undivided two-lane highway for its entire length.

The entire route is in Tangipahoa Parish.

mi	km	Destinations	Notes
0.000	0.000	LA 22 – Springfield, Ponchatoula	Southern terminus
2.762– 3.195	4.445– 5.142	I-12 – Hammond, Baton Rouge	Exit 35 on I-12
3.455	5.560	LA 1040 (Old Baton Rouge Highway)	Northern terminus
1.000 mi = 1.609 km; 1.000 km = 0.621 mi

== Louisiana Highway 1250 ==
Louisiana Highway 1250
- Location: Pineville
- Length: 0.705 mi (1,135 m)
- Existed: 2001–present

Louisiana Highway 1250 (LA 1250) runs 0.71 miles (1.14 km) in a general east–west direction from US 165 Bus. to the US 167 frontage road in Pineville. It has a spur that travels 0.04 miles (0.064 km) along East Shamrock Street from Melrose Street to Expressway Drive, the frontage road.

The route was formerly part of LA 107. Both LA 1250 and its spur are currently proposed for deletion as part of La DOTD's Road Transfer Program.

The entire highway is in Pineville, Rapides Parish.

mi	km	Destinations	Notes
0.000	0.000	US 165 Bus. (Main Street)	Western terminus
0.330	0.531	LA 1250 Spur (East Shamrock Street); Melrose Street to US 165 south	Western terminus of LA 1250 Spur
0.705	1.135	Expressway Drive to LA 107 south	Southern terminus; US 167 frontage road
1.000 mi = 1.609 km; 1.000 km = 0.621 mi

== Louisiana Highway 1251 ==
Louisiana Highway 1251
- Location: Plaquemine
- Length: 0.068 mi (109 m)
- Existed: 2001–present

Louisiana Highway 1251 (LA 1251) runs 0.07 miles (0.11 km) in a southwest to northeast direction from LA 1 to LA 75 in Plaquemine. The route serves as an access road to the Plaquemine Ferry across the Mississippi River and is open to authorized vehicles only. It is currently proposed for deletion as part of La DOTD's Road Transfer Program.

The entire highway is in Plaquemine, Iberville Parish.

mi	km	Destinations	Notes
0.000	0.000	LA 1 north (Church Street)	Western terminus; northbound lanes of a one-way pair
0.068	0.109	LA 75	Eastern terminus; to Plaquemine Ferry
1.000 mi = 1.609 km; 1.000 km = 0.621 mi

== Louisiana Highway 1252 ==
Louisiana Highway 1252
- Location: Carencro
- Length: 6.000 mi (9.656 km)
- Existed: 2002–present

Louisiana Highway 1252 (LA 1252) runs 6.00 miles (9.66 km) in a general east–west direction from the I-49 frontage road north of Carencro to the Lafayette–St. Martin parish line northeast of Carencro. The route was formerly part of LA 726, and it is currently proposed for deletion as part of La DOTD's Road Transfer Program.

Parish	Location	mi	km	Destinations	Notes
Lafayette		0.000	0.000	I-49 North Service Road	Western terminus
Lafayette–St. Martin parish line		6.000	9.656	End state maintenance at intersection of Pont Brulie Road and Cultivateur Road	Eastern terminus
1.000 mi = 1.609 km; 1.000 km = 0.621 mi

== Louisiana Highway 1253 ==
Louisiana Highway 1253
- Location: New Orleans
- Length: 0.550 mi (885 m)
- Existed: 2002–present

Louisiana Highway 1253 (LA 1253) runs 0.55 miles (0.89 km) in an east–west direction from the intersection of two local roads to a junction with I-10 in New Orleans.

The route begins at Downman Road between US 90 (Chef Menteur Highway) and LA 47 (Hayne Boulevard) and proceeds eastward along Morrison Road to an interchange with I-10 at exit 241. It is a divided four-lane highway for its entire length.

LA 1253 is a vestige of the original plans for the Eastern Expressway, incorporated into the route for I-10 by the time of its construction in the 1960s, which would have connected Morrison Road with North Claiborne Avenue via an expressway in the median of Elysian Fields Avenue. In the pre-1955 state highway system, the proposed route was given the temporary designation of State Route 2200, changed to LA 3021 in the 1955 Louisiana Highway renumbering. The disconnected Elysian Fields Avenue and Morrison Road segments were ultimately left out of the expressway plans and, though never connected, both retained the LA 3021 designation until the latter segment was given its own number in 2002.

The entire highway is in New Orleans, Orleans Parish.

mi	km	Destinations	Notes
0.000	0.000	Begin state maintenance at intersection of Morrison Road and Downman Road	Western terminus
0.550	0.885	I-10 – Slidell, Baton Rouge	Eastern terminus; exit 241 on I-10
1.000 mi = 1.609 km; 1.000 km = 0.621 mi

== Louisiana Highway 1254 ==
Louisiana Highway 1254
- Location: Pineville
- Length: 0.472 mi (760 m)
- Existed: 2002–present

Louisiana Highway 1254 (LA 1254) runs 0.47 miles (0.76 km) in an east–west direction along Mary Hill Road from a dead end on the east side of US 167 to the junction of US 165 and US 165 Bus. in Pineville. The route's mileposts increase from the eastern end contrary to common practice. LA 1254 was formerly part of LA 1203, and it is currently proposed for deletion as part of La DOTD's Road Transfer Program.

The entire highway is in Rapides Parish.

Location	mi	km	Destinations	Notes
	0.472	0.760	Dead end at US 167 right-of-way	Western terminus
Pineville	0.016– 0.000	0.026– 0.000	US 165 – Alexandria, Monroe US 165 Bus. south (Military Highway)	Eastern terminus of LA 1254; northern terminus of US 165 Bus.
1.000 mi = 1.609 km; 1.000 km = 0.621 mi

== Louisiana Highway 1255 ==
Louisiana Highway 1255
- Location: Jonesboro
- Length: 0.135 mi (217 m)
- Existed: 2004–present

Louisiana Highway 1255 (LA 1255) runs 0.14 miles (0.23 km) in a southeast to northwest direction along South Hudson Avenue from US 167 to the western side of the Kansas City Southern Railway overpass in Jonesboro. The route is bannered north–south. It was formerly part of US 167, and it is currently proposed for deletion as part of La DOTD's Road Transfer Program.

The entire highway is in Jonesboro, Jackson Parish.

mi	km	Destinations	Notes
0.000	0.000	US 167 (Old Winnfield Road) – Jonesboro, Winnfield	Southern terminus
0.135	0.217	End state maintenance on South Hudson Avenue	Northern terminus
1.000 mi = 1.609 km; 1.000 km = 0.621 mi

== Louisiana Highway 1256 ==
Louisiana Highway 1256
- Location: Sulphur
- Length: 2.298 mi (3.698 km)
- Existed: 2003–present

Louisiana Highway 1256 (LA 1256) runs 2.30 miles (3.70 km) in a north–south direction from the concurrent LA 27 and LA 108 in Carlyss to I-10 in Sulphur.

The route once extended north to US 90 and served as the original alignment of LA 27 through the area. The current alignment to the east was constructed in 1962 and designated as LA 3077 until 1999 when it became part of LA 27. The original route became LA 27 Bus. briefly until it assumed its current designation as LA 1256 in 2003. In 2012, the route was truncated on its north end to the I-10 interchange. The remainder is currently proposed for deletion as part of La DOTD's Road Transfer Program.

The entire highway is in Calcasieu Parish.

Location	mi	km	Destinations	Notes
Carlyss	0.000	0.000	LA 27 / LA 108 – Cameron	Southern terminus
Sulphur	2.076– 2.298	3.341– 3.698	I-10 – Lake Charles, Beaumont	Northern terminus; exit 20 on I-10
1.000 mi = 1.609 km; 1.000 km = 0.621 mi

== Louisiana Highway 1257 ==
Louisiana Highway 1257
- Location: Morehouse Parish
- Length: 0.650 mi (1,046 m)
- Existed: 2006–present

Louisiana Highway 1257 (LA 1257) runs 0.65 miles (1.05 km) in an east–west direction along Loop Park Road from US 425 to the entrance of Chemin-A-Haut State Park northeast of Bastrop.

The entire route is in Morehouse Parish.

mi	km	Destinations	Notes
0.000– 0.016	0.000– 0.026	US 425 (Hamburg Road) – Bastrop, Hamburg	Western terminus
0.650	1.046	End state maintenance at entrance to Chemin-A-Haut State Park	Eastern terminus
1.000 mi = 1.609 km; 1.000 km = 0.621 mi

== Louisiana Highway 1258 ==
Louisiana Highway 1258
- Location: Alexandria
- Length: 0.316 mi (509 m)
- Existed: 2007–present

Louisiana Highway 1258 (LA 1258) runs 0.32 miles (0.51 km) in an east–west direction along Old Boyce Road from LA 498 in Alexandria to a point at the city limits. It is currently proposed for deletion as part of La DOTD's Road Transfer Program.

The entire highway is in Alexandria, Rapides Parish.

mi	km	Destinations	Notes
0.000– 0.012	0.000– 0.019	LA 498 (Airbase Road)	Western terminus
0.316	0.509	End state maintenance on Old Boyce Road	Eastern terminus
1.000 mi = 1.609 km; 1.000 km = 0.621 mi

== Louisiana Highway 1259 ==
Louisiana Highway 1259
- Location: Denham Springs
- Length: 0.617 mi (993 m)
- Existed: 2009–present

Louisiana Highway 1259 (LA 1259) runs 0.62 miles (1.00 km) in an east–west direction from a local road to a junction with LA 3002 in Denham Springs. It is currently proposed for deletion as part of La DOTD's Road Transfer Program.

The entire highway is in Denham Springs, Livingston Parish.

mi	km	Destinations	Notes
0.000	0.000	Begin state maintenance at intersection of Government Drive and South River Road	Western terminus
0.384	0.618	US 190 (Florida Avenue)	
0.617	0.993	LA 3002 (South Range Avenue)	Eastern terminus
1.000 mi = 1.609 km; 1.000 km = 0.621 mi

== Louisiana Highway 1260 ==
Louisiana Highway 1260
- Location: Bancker
- Length: 1.663 mi (2.676 km)
- Existed: 2008–2015

Louisiana Highway 1260 (LA 1260) ran 1.66 miles (2.67 km) in an east–west direction from a dead end at the Vermilion River at Bancker to a junction with LA 330. The route was part of LA 690 prior to 2008 and was transferred to local control in 2015.

The entire highway was in Vermilion Parish.

Location	mi	km	Destinations	Notes
Bancker	0.000	0.000	Dead end at Vermilion River	Western terminus
	1.663	2.676	LA 330	Eastern terminus
1.000 mi = 1.609 km; 1.000 km = 0.621 mi

== Louisiana Highway 1261 ==
Louisiana Highway 1261
- Location: Plaquemines Parish
- Length: 2.263 mi (3.642 km)
- Existed: 2015–present

Louisiana Highway 1261 (LA 1261) runs 2.26 miles (3.64 km) in a southeast to northwest direction along Peters Road from LA 23 to a local road south of Belle Chasse. The route is bannered north–south.

LA 1261 represents the completed portion of the Peters Road Extension project which will ultimately extend northwest approximately 2.1 miles (3.4 km) further on a new alignment to connect with LA 3017 at the Plaquemines–Jefferson parish line. It will require a bridge across the Gulf Intracoastal Waterway near its northwestern end.

The entire route is in Plaquemines Parish.

mi	km	Destinations	Notes
0.000	0.000	LA 23 – Belle Chasse	Southern terminus
2.263	3.642	End state maintenance on Peters Road	Northern terminus
1.000 mi = 1.609 km; 1.000 km = 0.621 mi

== Louisiana Highway 1262 ==
Louisiana Highway 1262
- Location: Lake Charles
- Length: 0.525 mi (845 m)
- Existed: 2011–present

Louisiana Highway 1262 (LA 1262) runs 0.53 miles (0.85 km) in a north–south direction along North Lakeshore Drive from Broad Street to the concurrent I-10/US 90 in Lake Charles.

The entire highway is in Lake Charles, Calcasieu Parish.

mi	km	Destinations	Notes
0.000– 0.028	0.000– 0.045	Begin state maintenance at intersection of North Lakeshore Drive and Broad Street	Southern terminus
0.512– 0.525	0.824– 0.845	I-10 / US 90 – Lafayette, Beaumont	Northern terminus; exits 29 (eastbound) and 30A (westbound) on I-10
1.000 mi = 1.609 km; 1.000 km = 0.621 mi

== Louisiana Highway 1263 ==
Louisiana Highway 1263
- Location: St. Francisville
- Length: 1.860 mi (2.993 km)
- Existed: 2011–2018

Louisiana Highway 1263 (LA 1263) ran 1.86 miles (2.99 km) in a general north–south direction from the intersection of two local roads at the St. Francisville town limits to the junction of US 61 and LA 10 in St. Francisville.

The route began at the intersection of Ferdinand Street and Old Ferry Road at the St. Francisville corporate limits in West Feliciana Parish. It traveled northeast into town on Ferdinand Street to a T-intersection with LA 3057 at Commerce Street. LA 1263 turned northwest onto Commerce Street, running concurrent with LA 3057 until reaching a second T-intersection at Jackson Road. The route then turned northeast onto Jackson Road and proceeded to a four-way intersection with US 61 and LA 10. LA 1263 was an undivided two-lane highway for its entire length.

Prior to 2011, LA 1263 was part of LA 10, which crossed the Mississippi River by ferry until the completion of the John James Audubon Bridge downstream. The first signs erected labeled the route as LA 1258 apparently in error, as the official La DOTD highway maps and GIS showed the route as LA 1263. The portion of the route between the old ferry landing and the St. Francisville town limit was returned to local control in 2016 as part of the La DOTD's Road Transfer Program. The remainder of the route was deleted in 2018.

The entire highway was in St. Francisville, West Feliciana Parish.

mi	km	Destinations	Notes
0.000	0.000	Begin state maintenance on Ferdinand Street at town limits	Southern terminus
1.101	1.772	LA 3057 south (Commerce Street)	Southern end of LA 3057 concurrency
1.538	2.475	LA 3057 north (Commerce Street)	Northern end of LA 3057 concurrency
1.810– 1.860	2.913– 2.993	US 61 / LA 10 west – Baton Rouge, Natchez LA 10 east – Jackson	Northern terminus
1.000 mi = 1.609 km; 1.000 km = 0.621 mi: Concurrency terminus

== Louisiana Highway 1264 ==
Louisiana Highway 1264
- Location: New Orleans
- Length: 0.824 mi (1,326 m)
- Existed: 2012–present

Louisiana Highway 1264 (LA 1264) runs 0.82 miles (1.32 km) in an east–west direction along Leon C. Simon Drive in New Orleans. It consists of the Senator Ted Hickey Bridge over the Inner Harbor Navigation Canal and its approaches. The bridge and waterway are commonly referred to as the Seabrook Bridge and Industrial Canal, respectively. The route's mileposts increase from the eastern end contrary to common practice.

The entire highway is in New Orleans, Orleans Parish.

mi	km	Destinations	Notes
0.824– 0.560	1.326– 0.901	Begin state maintenance at intersection of Leon C. Simon Drive, Lakeshore Drive, and Leroy Johnson Drive	Western terminus; interchange
0.660– 0.259	1.062– 0.417	Senator Ted Hickey Bridge over Inner Harbor Navigation Canal (or Industrial Canal)	
0.232	0.373	Hayne Boulevard – South Shore Harbor and Marina	Eastbound exit only
0.000	0.000	End state maintenance at intersection of Leon C. Simon Drive, Stars and Stripes Boulevard, and Downman Road	Eastern terminus; to New Orleans Lakefront Airport
1.000 mi = 1.609 km; 1.000 km = 0.621 mi

== Louisiana Highway 1265 ==
Louisiana Highway 1265
- Location: Natchitoches Parish
- Length: 1.671 mi (2.689 km)
- Existed: 2014–present

Louisiana Highway 1265 (LA 1265) runs 1.67 miles (2.69 km) in a northeast to southwest direction along Five Forks Road from Thomas Sanders Road to a junction with LA 153 south of Ashland.

The entire route is in Natchitoches Parish.

mi	km	Destinations	Notes
1.671	2.689	Begin state maintenance at intersection of Five Forks Road and Thomas Sanders Road	Western terminus
0.000	0.000	LA 153 – Creston, Ashland	Eastern terminus
1.000 mi = 1.609 km; 1.000 km = 0.621 mi

== Louisiana Highway 1266 ==
Louisiana Highway 1266
- Location: Vermilion Parish
- Length: 2.076 mi (3.341 km)
- Existed: 2015–present

Louisiana Highway 1266 (LA 1266) runs 2.08 miles (3.35 km) in a north–south direction along Pleasant Drive from the entrance of Palmetto Island State Park to LA 690 south of Abbeville.

The entire route is in Vermilion Parish.

mi	km	Destinations	Notes
0.000	0.000	Begin state maintenance at entrance to Palmetto Island State Park	Southern terminus
2.076	3.341	LA 690	Northern terminus
1.000 mi = 1.609 km; 1.000 km = 0.621 mi

== Louisiana Highway 1267 ==
Louisiana Highway 1267
- Location: Barksdale Air Force Base
- Existed: 2023–present

Louisiana Highway 1267 (LA 1267) is a route that will eventually connect I-20 and I-220 to Barksdale Air Force Base. Construction started in 2019 and was partially completed in 2023. It will be fully opened in December 2025 with the completion of the new main entry gate for Barksdale AFB.

== Louisiana Highway 1268 ==
Louisiana Highway 1268
- Location: Bastrop
- Length: 5.75 mi (9.25 km)
- Existed: 2022–present

Louisiana Highway 1268 (LA 1268) runs 5.75 miles (9.25 km) in an east-west direction from the concurrent US 165/LA 2 west of Bastrop to the concurrent US 165/US 425/LA 2 within the city limits.

== Louisiana Highway 1270 ==
Louisiana Highway 1270
- Location: Grosse Tete
- Length: 0.5 mi (800 m)
- Existed: 2025–present

Louisiana Highway 1270 (LA 1270) runs 0.5 miles (0.80 km) in a north-south direction from LA 77 in Grosse Tete along Garnett Lane to a dead end point where Garnett Lane curves and becomes Locust Street.
