= Louisiana Highway 122 =

State highway in Louisiana, United States

Louisiana Highway 122

- Route of LA 122 highlighted in red

Route information
- Maintained by Louisiana DOTD
- Length: 26.096 mi (41.997 km)
- Existed: 1955 renumbering–present

Major junctions
- West end: US 71 / LA 1239-1 in Montgomery
- East end: LA 123 in Dry Prong

Location
- Country: United States
- State: Louisiana
- Parishes: Grant

Highway system
- Louisiana State Highway System; Interstate; US; State; Scenic
← LA 121	→ LA 123
← SR 161	SR 162	→ SR 163
← SR 474	SR 475	→ SR 476

Louisiana Highway 122 (LA 122) is a state highway located in Grant Parish, Louisiana. It runs 26.10 miles (42.00 km) in an east–west direction from the junction of U.S. Highway 71 (US 71) and LA 1239-1 in Montgomery to LA 123 in Dry Prong.

The highway traverses a thickly forested area between the town of Montgomery and the village of Dry Prong, two small municipalities in Grant Parish, located in the central portion of the state. Along its route, LA 122 passes through the small rural communities of Hargis, Verda, and Faircloth. The eastern portion of the route between Lake Iatt and Dry Prong is largely located within the Kisatchie National Forest.

== Route description ==
From the west, LA 122 begins at an intersection with US 71 in Montgomery, a small town in Grant Parish. The intersection is also a junction with LA 1239-1 (Old Jefferson Highway), a minor local route. LA 122 heads northeast from Montgomery into a thickly wooded rural area. Over the next seven miles (11 km), small clusters of homes sporadically line the highway at such points as the tiny community of Hargis. As it approaches the Winn Parish line, LA 122 curves to the southeast through the twin communities of Verda and New Verda. Here, the highway intersects LA 1240, which heads due south to a point on US 71 near Aloha. Shortly afterward, LA 122 begins a brief concurrency with LA 471, which heads north toward Winnfield, the seat of neighboring Winn Parish. Just beyond New Verda, LA 471 continues ahead to the south while LA 122 turns eastward onto an intersecting road.

The surroundings become more sparsely populated as the highway passes along the north side of Lake Iatt, which contains a game and fish preserve. About seven miles (11 km) beyond the turn-off, LA 122 curves sharply to the south before resuming an eastward course through an area known as Faircloth. The route then turns southeast into the Catahoula Ranger District of the Kisatchie National Forest. LA 122 winds its way through the piney woods for another 3.5 miles (5.6 km) before entering the village of Dry Prong. Traveling along Grove Street, the highway reaches its eastern terminus at a point on LA 123 located 0.2 miles (0.32 km) from a junction with US 167, connecting with Winnfield to the north and Alexandria to the south.

=== Route classification and data ===
LA 122 is an undivided two-lane highway for its entire length. The highway is classified as a rural major collector by the Louisiana Department of Transportation and Development (La DOTD). Daily traffic volume in 2013 averaged between 800 and 1,040 vehicles. The posted speed limit is generally 55 mph (90 km/h), reduced as low as 35 mph (55 km/h) through populated areas.

== History ==
=== Pre-1955 route numbering ===
State Route 162
- Location: Grant Parish
- Length: 25.2 mi (40.6 km)
- Existed: 1926–c. 1940s

In the original Louisiana Highway system in use between 1921 and 1955, the modern LA 122 was part of two largely concurrent routes. The majority of what is now LA 122 was originally part of State Route 162, an addition to the state highway system that was designated by an act of the state legislature in 1926.

Route 162. Beginning at a point on Route 99, five (5) miles North of Dry Prong to Verda, Louisiana, thence to Montgomery, Louisiana, over the Verda and Montgomery road.

— 1926 legislative route description

The route followed the modern LA 122 from Montgomery to Faircloth but rather than continuing into Dry Prong, it turned northeast onto what is now Parish Road 11 (Landfill Road) to a point on US 167 (pre-1955 State Route 99) near Williana.

State Route 475
- Location: Montgomery–Dry Prong
- Length: 26.9 mi (43.3 km)
- Existed: 1928–1955

Two years later, State Route 475 was established along the same alignment between Montgomery and Faircloth but with a terminus in Dry Prong rather than Williana.

Route 475. Beginning at Montgomery, intersecting the Jefferson Highway, running northeast via Verda, connecting with the Pershing Highway at Verda, thence in a southeasterly direction about one and one half mile, thence following the meanderings of the present graded road to a point on Iatt Lake to be designated by the La. Highway Commission, thence across said Iatt Lake via Hebron Church, following the meanderings of the present graded road as nearly as practicable to Dry Prong.

— 1928 legislative route description

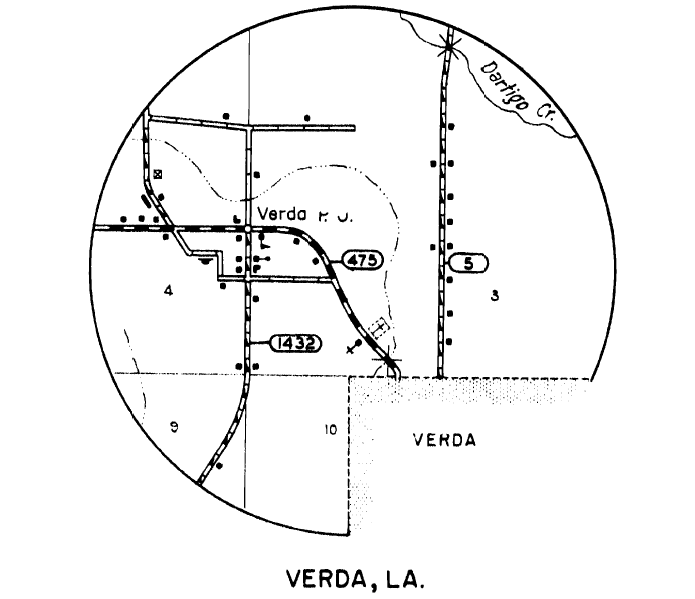
The original state route numbers along the present LA 122 through Verda, Louisiana.

As the more detailed legislative description for Route 475 indicates, Montgomery and Verda were located along the Jefferson Highway and Pershing Highway, respectively. These were two important auto trails that pre-dated the numbered U.S. Highway system. In 1926, US 71 was routed along the Jefferson Highway (State Route 1) through Montgomery, and US 167 was routed along the Pershing Highway (State Route 5) through Verda. The western portion of Route 162-475 that connected the new U.S. highways was gravelled around 1929. However, US 167 was shifted onto its present alignment through Dry Prong in 1932, allowing a more direct route between Alexandria and Winnfield. Soon afterward, the gravel road was extended eastward to Dry Prong along Route 475, which became the main traffic route, while the eastern portion of Route 162 between Faircloth and Williana remained unimproved. Route 162 was dropped from the state highway system prior to the 1955 Louisiana Highway renumbering, leaving the entire length between Montgomery and Dry Prong as Route 475 only. Paving of the Montgomery–Verda and Faircloth–Dry Prong sections of Route 475 was completed about 1954, leaving only the gap between Verda and Faircloth as a gravel road at the time of the renumbering.

=== Post-1955 route history ===
LA 122 was created in 1955 as a direct renumbering of former State Route 475. (Note: Maps of the pre-1955 system indicate that Route 475 might have continued along Grove Street in Dry Prong across the present LA 123 to a direct connection with US 167, but this 0.6-mile-long (0.97 km) section of road was apparently dropped from the system prior to the 1955 renumbering.)

La 122—From a junction with La-US 71 at or near Montgomery through or near Verda and Faircloth to a junction with La 123 at or near Dry Prong.

— 1955 legislative route description

Since the 1955 renumbering, the route of LA 122 has remained virtually the same. Only minor changes have resulted from the smoothing of several curves over the years. The biggest improvement to the route occurred early on when the last section of gravel highway between Verda and Faircloth was paved around 1957.

== Major intersections ==
The entire highway is in Grant Parish.

Location	mi	km	Destinations	Notes
Montgomery	0.000	0.000	US 71 – Alexandria, Shreveport; LA 1239-1 (Old Jefferson Highway)	Western terminus of LA 122; eastern terminus of LA 1239-1
Verda	7.229	11.634	LA 1240 south – Aloha	Northern terminus of LA 1240
New Verda	7.991	12.860	LA 471 north – Winnfield	West end of LA 471 concurrency
	9.276	14.928	LA 471 south – Colfax	East end of LA 471 concurrency
Dry Prong	26.096	41.997	LA 123 – Breezy Hill, Colfax	Eastern terminus
1.000 mi = 1.609 km; 1.000 km = 0.621 mi: Concurrency terminus
