= Louisiana Highway 123 =

State highway in Louisiana, United States

Louisiana Highway 123

- Route of LA 123 highlighted in red

Route information
- Maintained by Louisiana DOTD
- Length: 15.947 mi (25.664 km)
- Existed: 1955 renumbering–present

Major junctions
- West end: LA 8 east of Colfax
- LA 122 in Dry Prong; US 167 in Dry Prong
- East end: US 165 east of Breezy Hill

Location
- Country: United States
- State: Louisiana
- Parishes: Grant

Highway system
- Louisiana State Highway System; Interstate; US; State; Scenic
← LA 122	→ LA 124
← SR 616	SR 617	→ SR 618

Louisiana Highway 123 (LA 123) is a state highway located in Grant Parish, Louisiana. It runs 15.95 miles (25.67 km) in a southwest to northeast direction from LA 8 east of Colfax to US 165 east of Breezy Hill. The signage for LA 123 carries east–west directional banners unlike most odd numbered state highways in the primary range, which are bannered north–south.

The highway traverses a thickly forested area located almost entirely within the Kisatchie National Forest. About midway along its route, LA 123 passes through the village of Dry Prong, located on US 167. LA 123 comes close to intersecting a third U.S. route, as its western terminus is located less than four miles (6.4 km) from US 71 near the town of Colfax, the seat of Grant Parish. US 71, US 165, and US 167 all diverge northward out of Alexandria, the principal city of central Louisiana, located in neighboring Rapides Parish.

== Route description ==
From the west, LA 123 begins at a T-intersection on LA 8 located about 5.5 miles (8.9 km) east of Colfax and four miles (6.4 km) east of US 71 in Grant Parish. The route heads northeast, winding through the thick piney woods of the Kisatchie National Forest's Catahoula Ranger District. After 4.5 miles (7.2 km), rural residences begin to line the highway, and LA 123 soon enters the village of Dry Prong. At an intersection with Grove Street, the highway meets the eastern terminus of LA 122, connecting with Verda and Montgomery. Shortly afterward, LA 123 crosses US 167, an undivided four-lane highway connecting with the cities of Winnfield and Alexandria to the north and south, respectively.

After crossing the Kansas City Southern Railway (KCS) line at grade, LA 123 proceeds northeast out of Dry Prong and takes a serpentine path through the largely uninhabited pine forest. eight miles (13 km) later, after a nearly right-angle curve in the roadway, LA 123 passes through a point known as Breezy Hill. Here, it intersects LA 524, a former alignment of US 165 that connects to the modern alignment in either direction. LA 123 continues eastward for another 1.5 miles (2.4 km) to its own junction with US 165, a divided four-lane highway whose immediate destinations are Georgetown to the north and Pollock to the south. A local road named Grover Atwell Road continues straight ahead from this intersection to an area along the Union Pacific Railroad (UP) line known as Howcott.

=== Route classification and data ===
LA 123 is an undivided two-lane highway for its entire length. The highway is classified by the Louisiana Department of Transportation and Development (La DOTD) as a rural major collector from its western terminus through Dry Prong. The remainder of the route east of Dry Prong is classified as a rural minor collector. Daily traffic volume in 2013 averaged between 570 and 870 vehicles over most of the route. The lowest figure reported was 230 vehicles through the eastern portion near Breezy Hill. The posted speed limit is generally 55 mph (90 km/h), reduced to 35 mph (55 km/h) through Dry Prong.

== History ==
=== Pre-1955 route numbering ===
State Route 617
- Location: Grant Parish
- Length: 14.7 mi (23.7 km)
- Existed: 1930–1955

In the original Louisiana Highway system in use between 1921 and 1955, the modern LA 123 was designated as State Route 617. It was an addition to the state highway system enacted by the state legislature in 1930.

Route 617. Commencing at a point seven miles east of Colfax, Louisiana, at the intersection of the Colfax and Pollock Highway, thence proceeding in a northeasterly direction to Fuller's filling Station thence across the Louisiana & Arkansas Railroad, continuing in the same general direction to its intersection with the Pelican Highway, at Futrell's filling station, commonly known as the Colfax and Rochelle road.

— 1930 legislative route description

The entirety of Route 617 was graveled by the early 1930s and paved during the early 1950s. The only significant difference between the pre-1955 route and the current LA 123 is the eastern terminus, which was originally located at an intersection with the present LA 524 at Breezy Hill. This was the original alignment of the pre-1955 State Route 14, which became part of US 165 when the numbered U.S. Highway system was implemented in 1926. In 1949, US 165 was placed onto a new and straighter alignment bypassing Breezy Hill. The old alignment was retained in the state highway system as State Route C-2115 and served to connect Route 617 with the new section of highway.

=== Post-1955 route history ===
LA 123 was created in 1955 as a direct renumbering of former State Route 617.

La 123—From a junction with La 8 northeast of Colfax through or near Dry Prong and Breezy Hill to a junction with La-US 165.

— 1955 legislative route description

The old alignment of US 165 remained in the state highway system as LA 524, continuing to provide a state-maintained connection between Breezy Hill and the current alignment. However, an existing gravel local road was also taken into the system to provide a more direct connection. LA 123 therefore extends slightly further to the east compared to the pre-1955 route. This extension was paved by 1960. Since the 1955 renumbering, the route of LA 123 has remained virtually the same. Minor improvements include a sharp curve at Fire Tower Road between LA 8 and Dry Prong that has been bypassed, as well as a zigzag at Breezy Hill that has been smoothed out.

== Major intersections ==
The entire highway is in Grant Parish.

Location	mi	km	Destinations	Notes
	0.000	0.000	LA 8 – Colfax, Bentley	Western terminus
Dry Prong	5.554	8.938	LA 122 west – Verda, Montgomery	Eastern terminus of LA 122; to Iatt Lake National Forest Recreation Area
Dry Prong	5.776	9.296	US 167 – Williana, Winnfield	
Breezy Hill	14.499	23.334	LA 524	
	15.921– 15.947	25.622– 25.664	US 165 – Alexandria, Monroe	Eastern terminus
1.000 mi = 1.609 km; 1.000 km = 0.621 mi
