= U.S. Route 71 in Louisiana =

Highway in Louisiana

U.S. Highway 71

Route information
- Maintained by Louisiana DOTD
- Length: 231.10 mi (371.92 km)
- Existed: 1926–present
- Tourist routes: Louisiana Scenic Byway: Boom or Bust Byway

Major junctions
- South end: US 190 near Krotz Springs
- I-49 in Alexandria; I-20 from Bossier City to Shreveport; I-220 in Shreveport; I-49 near Hosston
- North end: US 71 at Arkansas state line

Location
- Country: United States
- State: Louisiana
- Parishes: St. Landry, Avoyelles, Rapides, Grant, Winn, Natchitoches, Red River, Bienville, Bossier, Caddo

Highway system
- United States Numbered Highway System; List; Special; Divided; Louisiana State Highway System; Interstate; US; State; Scenic
← LA 70	→ LA 72

U.S. Route 71 is a major north-south United States highway than runs from US 190 near Krotz Springs, Louisiana to Fort Frances–International Falls International Bridge in International Falls, Minnesota at the Canada–United States border. In the U.S. state of Louisiana, US 71 begins at an interchange with US 190 west of Krotz Springs, then travels in a mostly northwestern direction to the Arkansas state line just north of Ida, serving the major cities of Alexandria, Bossier City, and Shreveport.

With the advent of the Interstate Highway System, US 71 in Louisiana has been largely superseded by I-49, with most of US 71 running parallel to I-49. US 71 intersects I-49 three times in Louisiana: twice in Alexandria and once near Hosston. Additionally, US 71 briefly overlaps I-20 through Bossier City and Shreveport. The section of US 71 from LA 170 in Gilliam to LA 2 east in Hosston forms part of the Boom or Bust Byway, a Louisiana Scenic Byway.

== Route description ==
US 71 begins at an interchange with US 190 west of Krotz Springs in the Atchafalaya Basin. The highway travels through rural areas of St. Landry Parish, with the only towns along the route being the unincorporated communities of Lebeau and Morrow. US 71 enters Avoyelles Parish just south of LA 1178. The highway enters the town of Bunkie before entering Rapides Parish. US 71 travels through Cheneyville, then intersects US 167 near Lecompte. The two highways run concurrent until reaching I-49 in southern Alexandria, with US 167 leaving US 71 and running concurrent with I-49. Past I-49, US 71 enters the core of Alexandria where it is known locally as MacArthur Drive and runs concurrent with US 167 Bus. until the Lee Street intersection. US 71 continues to travel along MacArthur Drive then reaches Masonic Circle, a large traffic circle, where the highway intersects US 165 and LA 1208-5, with the former beginning an overlap with US 71 here. North of Masonic Circle, the highway becomes a limited-access expressway that features a mix of at-grade intersections and controlled-access interchanges, with the expressway ending at another interchange with I-49, this time near Downtown Alexandria. Passing I-49, US 71 crosses over the Red River on the Curtis Coleman Memorial Bridge into the neighboring city of Pineville. The overlap with US 165 ends near the Pineville Municipal Airport, with US 71 passing by the Alexandria VA Medical Center and travels through less developed parts of Pineville before reaching US 167 (Pineville Expressway). US 71 briefly overlaps with US 167 once again, this time along the northernmost part of the Pineville Expressway, with the overlap ending near the Timber Trails neighborhood.

Leaving Pineville, the highway's route becomes rural again. In Grant Parish, US 71 bypasses the town of Colfax and directly serves the town of Montgomery, then briefly enters Winn Parish before entering Natchitoches Parish. In Natchitoches Parish, the highway's route is still mostly rural as US 71 travels east of the town of Natchitoches, with the only direct connection to the town being LA 6, with the two highways intersecting one another in Clarence. Also in Clarence, US 71 begins an overlap with US 84, with the two highways running concurrent to Coushatta, where US 84 travels to the town's central business district and US 71 bypassing this area, traveling along Cut-Off Road until reaching US 371, with the two highways sharing a brief concurrency through northern Coushatta that ends at the Coushatta–Edgefield town line. US 71 travels through the southwestern corner of Bienville Parish then crosses the Loggy Bayou, entering Bossier Parish. The highway continues to travel through rural areas until the intersection with LA 612, where US 71 enters Bossier City. Known locally as Barksdale Boulevard, US 71 travels through suburban areas in the southeastern part of the city until intersecting LA 3032, which is also the main gate to Barksdale Air Force Base. The highway continues to pass-by several subdivisions, but features more commercial areas as well until reaching I-20 near the city's downtown area. US 71 then travels concurrent with I-20 as the two highways cross over the Red River, with US 71 leaving I-20 in Downtown Shreveport at LA 1, then begins an overlap with LA 1. In Downtown Shreveport, US 71/LA 1 travel along a pair of one-way streets, with northbound traffic running along Spring Street and southbound traffic on Market Street, before becoming a single two-way street (Market Street) near Cross Bayou. The two highways travel through a mostly industrial area of northern Shreveport until meeting I-220. North of I-220, US 71 travels through an area of Shreveport known as North Highlands, featuring a mix of residential and commercial/retail areas, with the overlap with LA 1 ending near Pine Hill Road at the Shreveport northern city limits. Leaving Shreveport, US 71 travels through rural areas once again, serving the smaller towns of Belcher and Gilliam. North of Gilliam, the highway intersects I-49 for a third time, runs through Hosston, then crosses I-49 for a fourth and final time in Louisiana, though this time without any direct access between the two highways. US 71 then serves the town of Ida before exiting Louisiana into Arkansas.

== History ==
The original southern terminus of US 71 was in Baton Rouge, Louisiana at the Baton Rouge-Port Allen Mississippi River ferry. This was also the original western terminus of US 190 which continued east from the ferry landing through Baton Rouge, shortly intersecting US 61. US 71 was routed along the Jefferson Highway (pre-1955 State Route 1) from Baton Rouge north to Clarence (near Natchitoches). From Clarence to Shreveport, a more direct route was chosen than that followed by the Jefferson Highway, and US 71 continued north into Arkansas rather than west into Texas.

The current route of US 71 in Louisiana follows or closely parallels the 1926 alignment north of Lebeau. Between Port Allen and Lebeau, US 71 originally followed present-day LA 76 to Rosedale, LA 77 to Ravenswood, and LA 10 to Lebeau, crossing the Atchafalaya River by ferry at Melville. In 1935, US 190 was extended west onto a newly built section of State Route 7 (the Evangeline Highway) with a bridge across the Atchafalaya River at Krotz Springs. The following year, US 71 was moved onto this route, branching northward to Lebeau from its current southern terminus west of Krotz Springs and bypassing the ferry crossing at Melville. In 1940, US 71 and 190 were moved onto the new Mississippi River Bridge at Baton Rouge, bypassing the ferry crossing there. US 71 was cut back to its current southern terminus west of Krotz Springs in 1951.

== Major intersections ==
Parish	Location	mi	km	Exit	Destinations	Notes
St. Landry		0.0	0.0	—	US 190 – Opelousas, Baton Rouge	Interchange; southern terminus
St. Landry	Lebeau	16.0	25.7		LA 10 east – Palmetto, Melville	South end of LA 10 overlap
St. Landry	Lebeau	16.1	25.9		LA 10 west – Washington	North end of LA 10 overlap
St. Landry		16.4	26.4		LA 361 north – Big Cane, Goudeau, Plaucheville	
St. Landry	Morrow	25.5	41.0		LA 107 east – Big Cane, Goudeau	
Avoyelles		27.6	44.4		LA 1178 north	
Avoyelles		33.7	54.2		LA 1176 west	
Avoyelles	Bunkie	35.5	57.1		LA 29 south to I-49 – Eola, Ville Platte	South end of LA 29 overlap
Avoyelles	Bunkie	35.7	57.5		LA 115 / LA 29 north (Church Street)	North end of LA 29 overlap; access to Bunkie General Hospital
Avoyelles	Bunkie	36.4	58.6		LA 1117 north (Shirley Road)	
Rapides	Cheneyville	44.1	71.0		LA 181 south to I-49	
Rapides		49.4	79.5		US 167 south – Turkey Creek, Ville Platte	South end of US 167 overlap
Rapides	Lecompte	51.7	83.2		LA 457 north	
Rapides	Lecompte	52.3	84.2		LA 112 west – Forest Hill, Leesville	
Rapides		55.4	89.2		LA 470 north	
Rapides		58.6	94.3		LA 470 south	
Rapides		59.1	95.1		LA 3170 east	
Rapides	Alexandria	62.9	101.2	63	I-49 (US 71 Byp. north) / US 167 north / US 167 Bus. begins – Opelousas, Alexandria	North end of US 167 overlap; south end of US 167 Bus. overlap; I-49 exit 80
Rapides	Alexandria	64.1	103.2		LA 3250 east	
Rapides	Alexandria	65.0	104.6		US 167 Bus. north	South end of US 167 Bus. overlap
Rapides	Alexandria	65.3	105.1		LA 1208-2 south	
Rapides	Alexandria	66.2	106.5		US 165 south – Lake Charles LA 1208-5 north (Masonic Drive)	South end of US 165 overlap; traffic circle
Rapides	Alexandria	67.1	108.0	—	LA 1208-3 (Jackson Street)	Interchange
Rapides	Alexandria	68.5	110.2		LA 28 west – Fort Polk, Leesville, Alexandria Intl Airport	South end of LA 28 overlap
Rapides	Alexandria	68.8	110.7		LA 496 west	
Rapides	Alexandria	69.2	111.4	—	Frontage Road	Interchange; southbound exit and entrance
Rapides	Alexandria	69.3	111.5	70	US 165 Bus. / LA 1 – Boyce, Marksville	Interchange
Rapides	Alexandria	70.1– 70.5	112.8– 113.5	71	I-49 (US 71 Byp. south) / LA 28 east – Opelousas, Shreveport	North end of LA 28 overlap; signed as exits 71A (south) and 71B (north); I-49 exit 86
Rapides	Alexandria	70.8	113.9		LA 1208-4 south	
Rapides	Alexandria–Pineville line	70.9– 71.4	114.1– 114.9	Curtis Coleman Memorial Bridge over the Red River		
Rapides	Pineville	72.8	117.2	—	US 165 north	Interchange; north end of US 165 overlap
Rapides		74.0	119.1		LA 1203	
Rapides		75.6	121.7	—	US 167 south / LA 3225 north – Pineville	Interchange; south end of US 167 overlap
Rapides		78.6	126.5	—	US 167 north – Winnfield, Ruston	Interchange; northbound exit and southbound entrance; north end of US 167 overlap
Rapides		79.3	127.6		LA 3225 south	
Grant		84.5	136.0		LA 1241 east	
Grant		87.3	140.5		LA 492 west	
Grant		92.7	149.2		LA 8 east / LA 3169 west	South end of LA 8 overlap
Grant		93.6	150.6		LA 8 west – Colfax	North end of LA 8 overlap
Grant		96.5	155.3		LA 158 – Colfax, Iatt Lake	
Grant		98.3	158.2		LA 471 north – Verda, Atlanta	
Grant		102.3	164.6		LA 1240 east	
Grant	Montgomery	109.9	176.9		LA 122 east / LA 1239-1 west	
Grant	Montgomery	110.4	177.7		LA 34 east / LA 1239-2 south	
Winn		118.4	190.5		LA 477 – Winnfield	
Natchitoches		121.0	194.7		LA 1225 north	
Natchitoches		122.9	197.8		LA 1226	
Natchitoches	Clarence	124.7	200.7		US 84 east / LA 6 west – Winnfield, Natchitoches	South end of US 84 overlap
Natchitoches	Campti	131.3	211.3		LA 480	
Natchitoches	Campti	132.4	213.1		LA 486 east	South end of LA 486 overlap
Natchitoches	Campti	132.7	213.6		LA 9 north – Black Lake, Creston, Arcadia	
Natchitoches	Campti	133.1	214.2		LA 486 north (Coulee Loop Road)	North end of LA 486 overlap
Natchitoches		148.2	238.5		LA 3163 south – Paper Mill	
Natchitoches		136.6	219.8		LA 486 south (Coulee Loop Road)	
Red River		139.8	225.0		LA 507 north – Martin	
Red River		146.1	235.1		LA 784 east – John K. Kelly Grand Bayou Reservoir District	
Red River	Coushatta	148.3	238.7		US 84 west – Mansfield	North end of US 84 overlap
Red River	Coushatta	149.1	240.0		US 371 south	South end of US 371 overlap; access to CHRISTUS Coushatta Health Care Center
Red River	Coushatta	149.7	240.9		LA 155 east – Ashland	
Red River	Coushatta	150.6	242.4		US 371 north – Ringgold, Minden	North end of US 371 overlap
Red River		152.0	244.6		LA 783 north	
Red River		155.9	250.9		LA 515 north – East Point	
Red River		161.4	259.7		LA 514 – East Point, Hall Summit	
Red River–Bienville parish line		165.5	266.3		LA 4 east – Ringgold	
Bienville	No major junctions					
Bossier		166.5	268.0		LA 515 south – East Point	
Bossier		174.6	281.0		LA 157 north	
Bossier		177.2	285.2		LA 154 east – Ringgold	
Bossier		180.6	290.6		LA 527 east – Lake Bistineau State Park	
Bossier	Bossier City	185.1	297.9		LA 612 east	
Bossier	Bossier City	187.0	300.9		LA 511 west (Jimmie Davis Highway) – Shreveport	
Bossier	Bossier City	190.1	305.9		LA 3032 west (Westgate Drive) – Shreveport	
Bossier	Bossier City	191.7– 192.2	308.5– 309.3		I-20 east / LA 3 / LA 72	South end of I-20 overlap; US 71 south follows I-20 exit 20C
See I-20
Caddo	Shreveport	193.4– 193.6	311.2– 311.6		I-20 west to I-49 – Dallas LA 1 south (Market Street)	North end of I-20 overlap; US 71 north follows I-20 exit 19A; south end of LA 1 overlap
Caddo	Shreveport	193.9	312.1		US 79 / US 80 (Texas Street)	
Caddo	Shreveport	194.1	312.4		LA 173 north (Caddo Street)	
Caddo	Shreveport	194.9	313.7		LA 3036 west (North Common Street)	
Caddo	Shreveport	195.6	314.8		LA 3049 north (North Thomas Drive)	
Caddo	Shreveport	195.9	315.3		LA 3094 south (North Hearne Avenue)	
Caddo	Shreveport	197.2– 197.5	317.4– 317.8		I-220 – Texarkana, Monroe	I-220 exits 7A-B
Caddo	Shreveport	197.7	318.2		LA 3194 west (Martin Luther King, Jr. Drive) / Ravendale Drive	
Caddo	Shreveport	199.4	320.9	—	LA 1 north to I-49 north – Oil City, Texarkana	Interchange; north end of LA 1 overlap
Caddo		200.0	321.9		LA 538 south	South end of LA 538 overlap
Caddo		200.1	322.0		LA 538 north – Mooringsport	North end of LA 538 overlap
Caddo		206.9	333.0		LA 173 – Blanchard, Dixie	
Caddo		208.4	335.4		LA 169 north	
Caddo	Belcher	212.3	341.7		LA 530 – Oil City, Belcher	
Caddo	Gilliam	217.0	349.2		LA 170 west / LA 3049 south – Vivian, Gilliam	
Caddo		218.9– 219.1	352.3– 352.6		I-49 – Shreveport, Texarkana	I-49 exit 234
Caddo	Hosston	221.4	356.3		LA 2 west – Vivian	South end of LA 2 overlap
Caddo	Hosston	222.0	357.3		LA 2 east – Plain Dealing	North end of LA 2 overlap
Caddo	Mira	225.8	363.4		PR 16 to I-49 – Myrtis	
Caddo	Ida	230.0	370.1		LA 168 west – Rodessa	
Caddo	Ida	231.1	371.9		US 71 north – Texarkana	Continuation into Arkansas
1.000 mi = 1.609 km; 1.000 km = 0.621 mi: Concurrency terminus; Incomplete access
