= Iatt =

Iatt may refer to:

- Iatt, Louisiana, a community in the United States
- Lake Iatt, a lake in Louisiana
- International Association for Technology Trade (IATT). a business consortium
