= KVDP =

KVDP may refer to:

- Kevin van der Perren
- KVDP (FM), a radio station (89.1 FM) licensed to Dry Prong, Louisiana, United States
