= Louisiana Highway 158 =

State highway in Louisiana, United States

Louisiana Highway 158

- Route of LA 158 highlighted in red

Route information
- Maintained by Louisiana DOTD
- Length: 6.357 mi (10.231 km)
- Existed: 1955 renumbering–present

Major junctions
- South end: LA 8 in Colfax
- US 71 at The Rock
- North end: Local road north of Colfax

Location
- Country: United States
- State: Louisiana
- Parishes: Grant

Highway system
- Louisiana State Highway System; Interstate; US; State; Scenic
| ← LA 157 | → LA 159 |

Louisiana Highway 158 (LA 158) is a state highway located in Grant Parish, Louisiana. It runs 6.36 miles (10.24 km) in a north–south direction from LA 8 in Colfax to a junction of local roads near Lake Iatt, north of Colfax.

The route connects Colfax, the parish seat, with U.S. Highway 71 (US 71) north of town. Its extension north of US 71 connects to a sparsely populated area on the western shore of Lake Iatt.

== Route description ==
From the south, LA 158 begins at an intersection with LA 8 in Colfax. LA 8 travels through town on Main Street, connecting to Alexandria via Boyce to the southeast and to Pollock due east. From this intersection, LA 158 proceeds northwest on 8th Street, flanked by the Kansas City Southern Railway (KCS) tracks and a row of historic commercial buildings. After 0.6 miles (0.97 km), the route leaves Colfax, and the surroundings transition to a rural environment. 0.5 miles (0.80 km) later, LA 158 curves to the northeast along Sugarhouse Bayou and crosses the KCS tracks. It then curves to the north and crosses a bridge over Bayou Grappe. Shortly afterward, LA 158 intersects US 71 at a point known as The Rock. US 71 heads to Alexandria to the southeast and Shreveport to the northwest.

After making a very brief jog onto US 71, LA 158 continues northeast through a thickly forested area. After 2.4 miles (3.9 km), the road curves to the east and continues for another 1.5 miles (2.4 km) to a junction with three local roads just west of Lake Iatt: Claudes Road (north), Rice Patch Road (east), and Viney Ridge Road (south).

The route is classified as a rural local road by the Louisiana Department of Transportation and Development (La DOTD). The section south of US 71 has an average daily traffic volume of 2,300. It has a posted speed limit within Colfax of 25 mph (40 km/h) at its southern terminus, increasing to 35 mph (55 km/h) at North Street and to 45 mph (70 km/h) at Foulk Street. North of US 71, the average daily traffic volume drops to 600 vehicles, and the route has a posted speed limit of 40 mph (65 km/h). LA 158 is an undivided two-lane highway for its entire length.

== History ==
In the original Louisiana Highway system in use between 1921 and 1955, the modern route of LA 158 south of US 71 was originally part of both State Route 1 and State Route 5. Both were designated in 1921 by an act of the state legislature and were routed along established auto trails: Route 1 followed the Jefferson Highway throughout the state, and Route 5 followed the Pershing Way. At the time, the portion of Routes 1 and 5 running through Colfax served as the main highway connecting Alexandria with Shreveport and Ruston, respectively. In 1926, this became part of the original route of US 71, which followed Route 1 through central Louisiana. When US 71 was moved onto its current alignment bypassing Colfax around 1950, Routes 1 and 5 were moved along with it. The former alignment became State Route C-2116 until the 1955 Louisiana Highway renumbering.

LA 158 was created in the 1955 renumbering, following the portion of the route between Colfax and US 71 as described above.

La 158—From a junction with La 8 at or near Colfax north to a junction with La-US 71.

— 1955 legislative route description

The section north of US 71 leading to Lake Iatt was added to the state highway system later as an extension of LA 158.

== Future ==
La DOTD is currently engaged in a program that aims to transfer about 5,000 miles (8,000 km) of state-owned roadways to local governments over the next several years. Under this plan of "right-sizing" the state highway system, the entire route of LA 158 is proposed for deletion as it does not meet a significant interurban travel function.

== Major intersections ==
The entire highway is in Grant Parish.

| Location | mi | km | Destinations | Notes |
|---|---|---|---|---|
| Colfax | 0.000– 0.017 | 0.000– 0.027 | LA 8 (Main Street) – Boyce, Pollock, Alexandria | Southern terminus |
| The Rock | 2.475– 2.540 | 3.983– 4.088 | US 71 south – Alexandria | South end of US 71 concurrency |
| The Rock | 0.058-mile (0.093 km) concurrency with US 71 not counted in LA 158 route mileage | | | |
| The Rock | 2.540 | 4.088 | US 71 north – Shreveport | North end of US 71 concurrency |
| | 6.357 | 10.231 | Rice Patch Road / Viney Ridge Road | Northern terminus |
1.000 mi = 1.609 km; 1.000 km = 0.621 mi: Concurrency terminus
