= Noble, Louisiana =

- Village
- Village of Noble
- Location of Noble in Sabine Parish, Louisiana.

- Location of Louisiana in the United States
- Coordinates: 31°41′24″N 93°41′00″W
- Country: United States
- State: Louisiana
- Parish: Sabine

Area
  - Total: 1.03 sq mi (2.68 km^{2})
  - Land: 1.03 sq mi (2.68 km^{2})
  - Water: 0 sq mi (0.00 km^{2})
- Elevation: 272 ft (83 m)

Population (2020)
  - Total: 200
  - Density: 193.6/sq mi (74.74/km^{2})
- Time zone: UTC-6 (CST)
  - Summer (DST): UTC-5 (CDT)
- Area code: 318
- FIPS code: 22-55420
- GNIS feature ID: 2407511

Noble is a village in Sabine Parish, Louisiana, United States. As of the 2020 census, Noble had a population of 200.

== Geography ==
According to the United States Census Bureau, the village has a total area of 1.0 square miles (2.7 km^{2}), all land.

== Demographics ==
Historical population
Census	Pop.	Note	%±
1910	453		—
1920	316		−30.2%
1930	268		−15.2%
1940	238		−11.2%
1950	238		0.0%
1960	206		−13.4%
1970	209		1.5%
1980	194		−7.2%
1990	225		16.0%
2000	259		15.1%
2010	252		−2.7%
2020	200		−20.6%
2025 (est.)	209	▲	4.5%
U.S. Decennial Census

As of the census of 2000, there were 259 people, 91 households, and 65 families residing in the village. The population density was 252.1 inhabitants per square mile (97.3/km^{2}). There were 104 housing units at an average density of 101.2 per square mile (39.1/km^{2}). The racial makeup of the village was 61.78% White, 28.19% Native American, and 10.04% from two or more races. Hispanic or Latino of any race were 6.18% of the population.

There were 91 households, out of which 49.5% had children under the age of 18 living with them, 60.4% were married couples living together, 4.4% had a female householder with no husband present, and 27.5% were non-families. 25.3% of all households were made up of individuals, and 14.3% had someone living alone who was 65 years of age or older. The average household size was 2.85 and the average family size was 3.47.

In the village, the population was spread out, with 35.5% under the age of 18, 8.9% from 18 to 24, 28.6% from 25 to 44, 16.2% from 45 to 64, and 10.8% who were 65 years of age or older. The median age was 29 years. For every 100 females, there were 97.7 males. For every 100 females age 18 and over, there were 94.2 males.

The median income for a household in the village was $38,594, and the median income for a family was $45,833. Males had a median income of $32,813 versus $18,125 for females. The per capita income for the village was $14,982. About 2.9% of families and 7.6% of the population were below the poverty line, including 7.2% of those under the age of eighteen and 25.0% of those 65 or over.

== Education ==
Public schools in Sabine Parish are operated by the Sabine Parish School Board. There are no schools in Noble and students attend campuses in neighboring communities.
