= Chase, Louisiana =

- Unincorporated community
- Location within Louisiana Location within the United States
- Coordinates: 32°05′50″N 91°41′56″W
- Country: United States
- State: Louisiana
- Parish: Franklin
- Elevation: 72 ft (22 m)
- Time zone: UTC-6 (Central (CST))
  - Summer (DST): UTC-5 (CDT)
- ZIP code: 71324
- Area code: 318
- GNIS feature ID: 543075

Chase is an unincorporated community in Franklin Parish, Louisiana, United States. Its ZIP code is 71324.
