= Palmetto Island State Park =

State park in Louisiana, United States

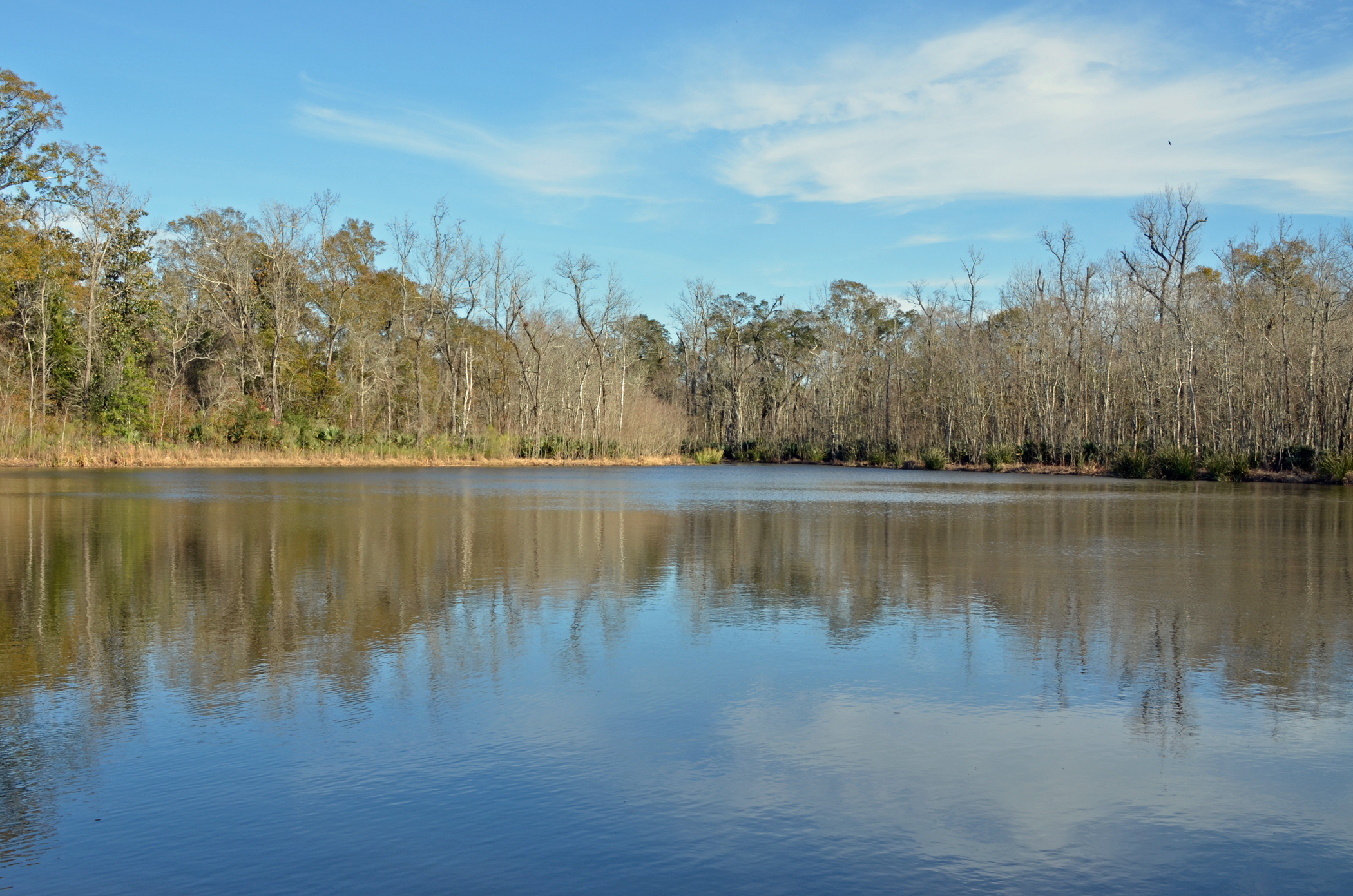
- A lagoon in Palmetto Island State Park

- Location within Louisiana
- Location: Vermilion Parish, Louisiana, United States of America
- Coordinates: 29°52′09″N 92°09′06″W
- Area: 1,299 acres (5.26 km^{2}; 2.030 sq mi)
- Established: October 28, 2010
- Visitors: 79,159 (in 2022)
- Governing body: Louisiana Office of State Parks
- Website: www.crt.state.la.us/parks/ipalmetto.aspx

Palmetto Island State Park is a recent addition to the Louisiana State Park system. The new state park is located south of Abbeville, Louisiana in Vermilion Parish. The state of Louisiana acquired the property for the park in 1981 but did not begin construction on it with the intent of public use until 2002. State budget constraints and other concerns delayed the park's opening until October 28, 2010.

The park, 1,299 acres (5.26 km^{2}) in size, is noted for its abundance of palmettos (mostly dwarf palmetto), which form a dense understory in the coastal bottomland hardwood forest that predominates here. Palmetto Island State Park has a visitor center which houses a multi-purpose room that can rented for meetings, weddings and other social events. A water playground is located nearby. Guests may stay at one of six two-bedroom cabins nestled in the woods or use any of the park's 95 campsites. There are four picnic pavilions and strategically placed picnic sites for visitors. An aquatic pavilion overlooks the Vermilion River. Access to the Vermilion River is provided by a boat launch. Interior lagoons allow canoers and kayakers the opportunity to observe native animal and plant life, including a new population of Iris nelsonii. A nature trail (of 0.75 miles) begins at the park's visitor center.

The park address is 19501 Pleasant Road, Abbeville, LA 70510.
