= Iatt, Louisiana =

Unincorporated community in Louisiana, U.S.

Coordinates: 31°41′11″N 92°42′24″W

Iatt is an unincorporated community in Grant Parish, in the U.S. state of Louisiana.

== History ==
Iatt most likely is named after a sub-tribe of the Comanche Indians. A post office called Iatt was established in 1879, and remained in operation until 1919.
