= Aloha, Louisiana =

Unincorporated community in Louisiana, U.S.

Coordinates: 31°35′00″N 92°46′21″W

Aloha is an unincorporated community in Grant Parish, Louisiana, United States.

== History ==
The community was named after the Hawaiian greeting and parting phrase aloha. The name was likely inspired by the song "Aloha ʻOe".
