= Dry Prong, Louisiana =

- Village
- Location of Dry Prong in Grant Parish, Louisiana.

- Location of Louisiana in the United States
- Coordinates: 31°34′50″N 92°31′50″W
- Country: United States
- State: Louisiana
- Parish: Grant

Government
  - Mayor: John L. Landry

Area
  - Total: 1.40 sq mi (3.62 km^{2})
  - Land: 1.39 sq mi (3.59 km^{2})
  - Water: 0.012 sq mi (0.03 km^{2})
- Elevation: 220 ft (67 m)

Population (2020)
  - Total: 455
  - Density: 328.3/sq mi (126.75/km^{2})
- Time zone: UTC-6 (CST)
  - Summer (DST): UTC-5 (CDT)
- Area code: 318
- FIPS code: 22-21765
- GNIS feature ID: 2407444

Dry Prong is a village in central Grant Parish, Louisiana, United States. It is part of the Alexandria, Louisiana Metropolitan Statistical Area. As of the 2020 census, Dry Prong had a population of 455.

== History ==
Dry Prong was incorporated as a village in 1945.

According to tradition, the village received its name when a family moved to the region in the 1870s to build a sawmill. To power the mill, they built a water wheel, only to discover that the creek over which they had built it went dry every summer: the creek was a "dry prong". The mill was soon rebuilt over a nearby creek which flowed all year, but the name stuck. The creek is now outside the city limits, on Highway 123. Shane Davis is the current mayor of the village.

== Geography ==
Dry Prong is located at the center of Grant Parish. U.S. Route 167 passes through the village, leading north 26 miles (42 km) to Winnfield and south 22 miles (35 km) to Alexandria. The village is within Kisatchie National Forest.

According to the United States Census Bureau, the village has a total area of 1.3 square miles (3.4 km^{2}), of which 0.01 square miles (0.02 km^{2}), or 0.65%, is water.

=== Major highways ===
- U.S. Route 167
- Louisiana Highway 122
- Louisiana Highway 123

== Demographics ==
Historical population
Census	Pop.	Note	%±
1950	377		—
1960	360		−4.5%
1970	352		−2.2%
1980	526		49.4%
1990	380		−27.8%
2000	421		10.8%
2010	436		3.6%
2020	455		4.4%
2025 (est.)	443	▼	−2.6%
U.S. Decennial Census

As of the census of 2000, there were 421 people, 176 households, and 124 families residing in the village. The population density was 315.8 inhabitants per square mile (121.9/km^{2}). There were 195 housing units at an average density of 146.3 per square mile (56.5/km^{2}). The racial makeup of the village was 95.25% White, 0.95% African American, 0.24% Native American, 1.66% from other races, and 1.90% from two or more races. Hispanic or Latino of any race were 2.61% of the population.

There were 176 households, out of which 30.7% had children under the age of 18 living with them, 55.7% were married couples living together, 11.9% had a female householder with no husband present, and 29.5% were non-families. 28.4% of all households were made up of individuals, and 14.8% had someone living alone who was 65 years of age or older. The average household size was 2.39 and the average family size was 2.91.

In the village, the population was spread out, with 25.7% under the age of 18, 5.7% from 18 to 24, 25.7% from 25 to 44, 27.8% from 45 to 64, and 15.2% who were 65 years of age or older. The median age was 40 years. For every 100 females, there were 97.7 males. For every 100 females age 18 and over, there were 94.4 males.

The median income for a household in the village was $32,917, and the median income for a family was $43,214. Males had a median income of $36,944 versus $18,864 for females. The per capita income for the village was $13,978. About 12.9% of families and 19.0% of the population were below the poverty line, including 25.0% of those under age 18 and 13.5% of those age 65 or over.

== Education ==
Dry Prong residents are zoned to Grant Parish School Board schools.

== Media ==
- KVDP (FM), a radio station (89.1 FM)

== Notable people ==
- W. K. Brown, state representative from 1960 to 1972, was reared in Dry Prong.
- Billy Chandler, state representative from Grant, La Salle, and Winn parishes
