= Hargis, Louisiana =

- Unincorporated community
- Location within Louisiana Location within the United States
- Coordinates: 31°41′04″N 92°49′48″W
- Country: United States
- State: Louisiana
- Parish: Grant
- Elevation: 217 ft (66 m)
- Time zone: UTC-6 (Central (CST))
  - Summer (DST): UTC-5 (CDT)
- Area code: 318
- GNIS feature ID: 547438

Hargis is an unincorporated community in Grant Parish, Louisiana, United States.

== Notable person ==
- Jesse C. Deen, Louisiana politician, lived in Hargis.
