= Verda, Louisiana =

- Unincorporated community
- Location within Louisiana Location within the United States
- Coordinates: 31°42′00″N 92°46′23″W
- Country: United States
- State: Louisiana
- Parish: Grant
- Elevation: 207 ft (63 m)
- Time zone: UTC-6 (Central (CST))
  - Summer (DST): UTC-5 (CDT)
- Area code: 318
- GNIS feature ID: 556324

Verda is an unincorporated community in Grant Parish, Louisiana, United States. Verda is east of Montgomery and just past Hargis.
