= Montgomery, Louisiana =

- Town
- Town of Montgomery
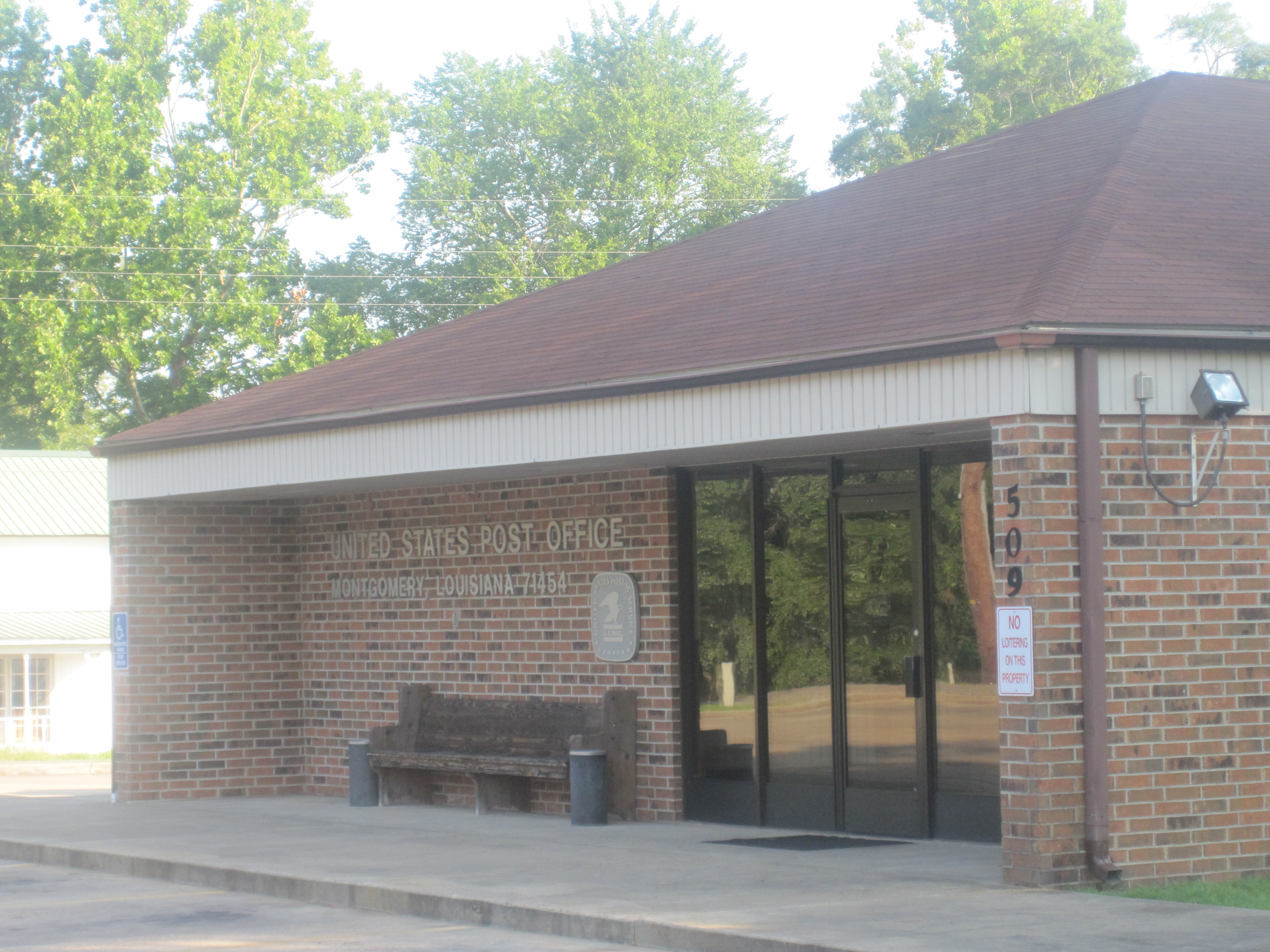
- U.S. Post Office in Montgomery, Louisiana

- Location of Montgomery in Grant Parish, Louisiana.

- Location of Louisiana in the United States
- Coordinates: 31°39′45″N 92°52′50″W
- Country: United States
- State: Louisiana
- Parish: Grant

Area
  - Total: 2.07 sq mi (5.36 km^{2})
  - Land: 2.07 sq mi (5.35 km^{2})
  - Water: 0.0039 sq mi (0.01 km^{2})
- Elevation: 154 ft (47 m)

Population (2020)
  - Total: 622
  - Rank: GR: 2nd
  - Density: 301.0/sq mi (116.23/km^{2})
- Time zone: UTC-6 (CST)
  - Summer (DST): UTC-5 (CDT)
- ZIP code: 71454
- Area code: 318
- FIPS code: 22-51620
- GNIS feature ID: 2406180

Montgomery is a town in the far northwestern portion of Grant Parish, which is located in north-central Louisiana, United States. As of the 2020 census, Montgomery had a population of 622. The town has a poverty rate of 37 percent and a median household income of just under $22,000. The median age is just under forty; the population in 2010 was 78 percent white.

Montgomery is part of the Alexandria Metropolitan Statistical Area though it is forty miles north of Alexandria. Founded in 1712, even before New Orleans, Montgomery is situated on U.S. Route 71, close to the boundary with Natchitoches and Winn parishes. It is located on the eastern bank of the Red River.

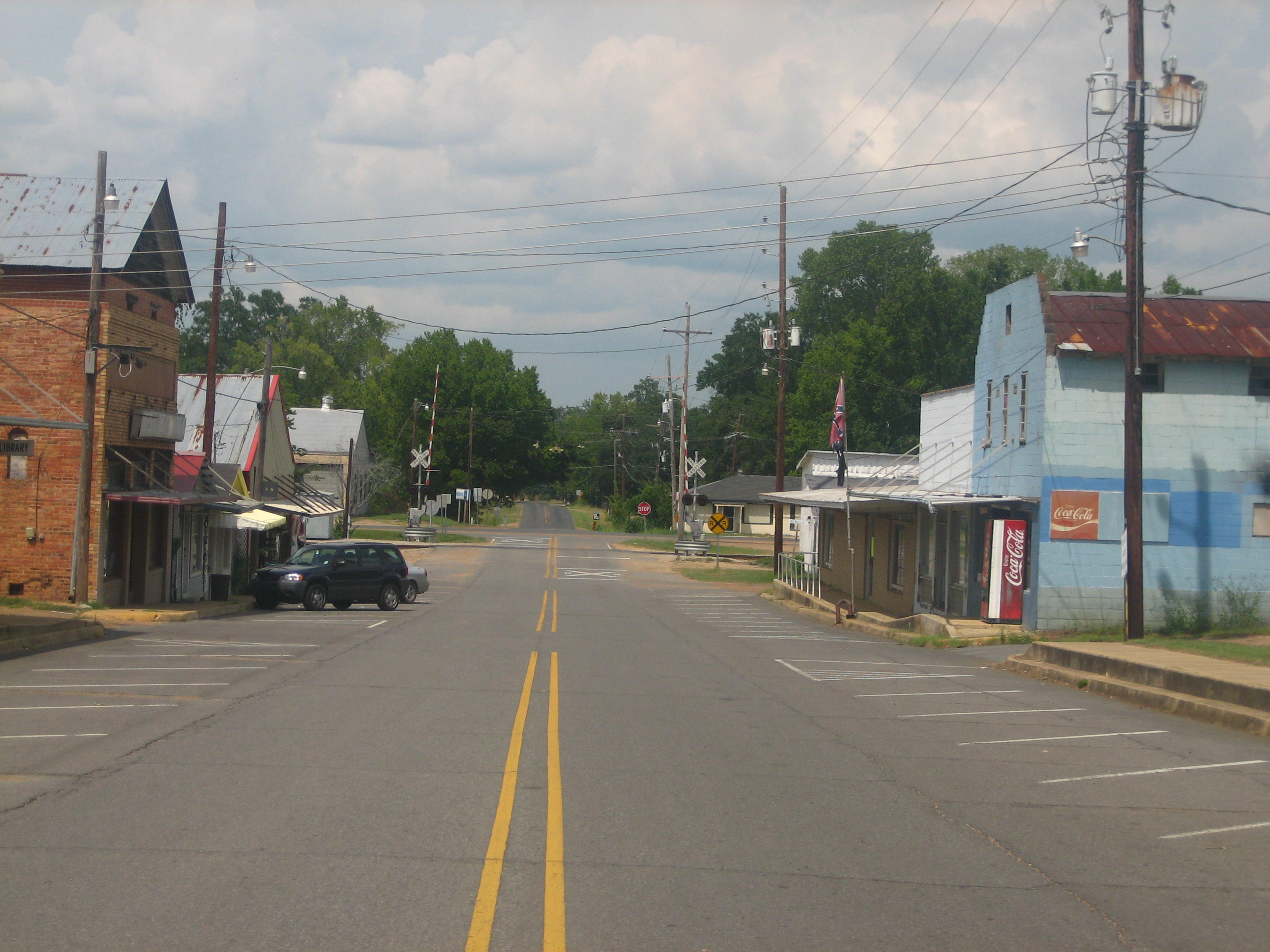
Downtown Montgomery facing east

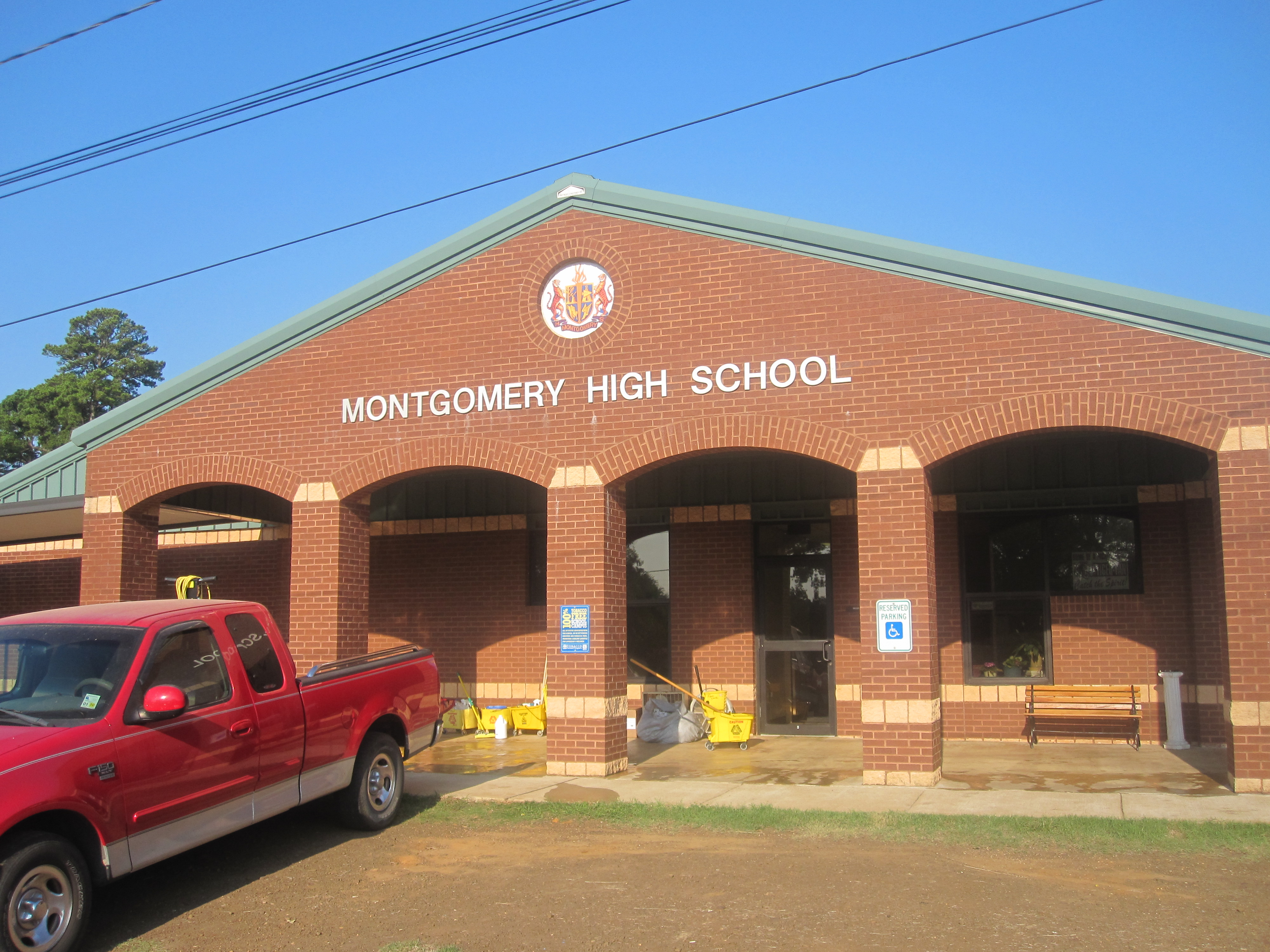
Montgomery High School

== History ==
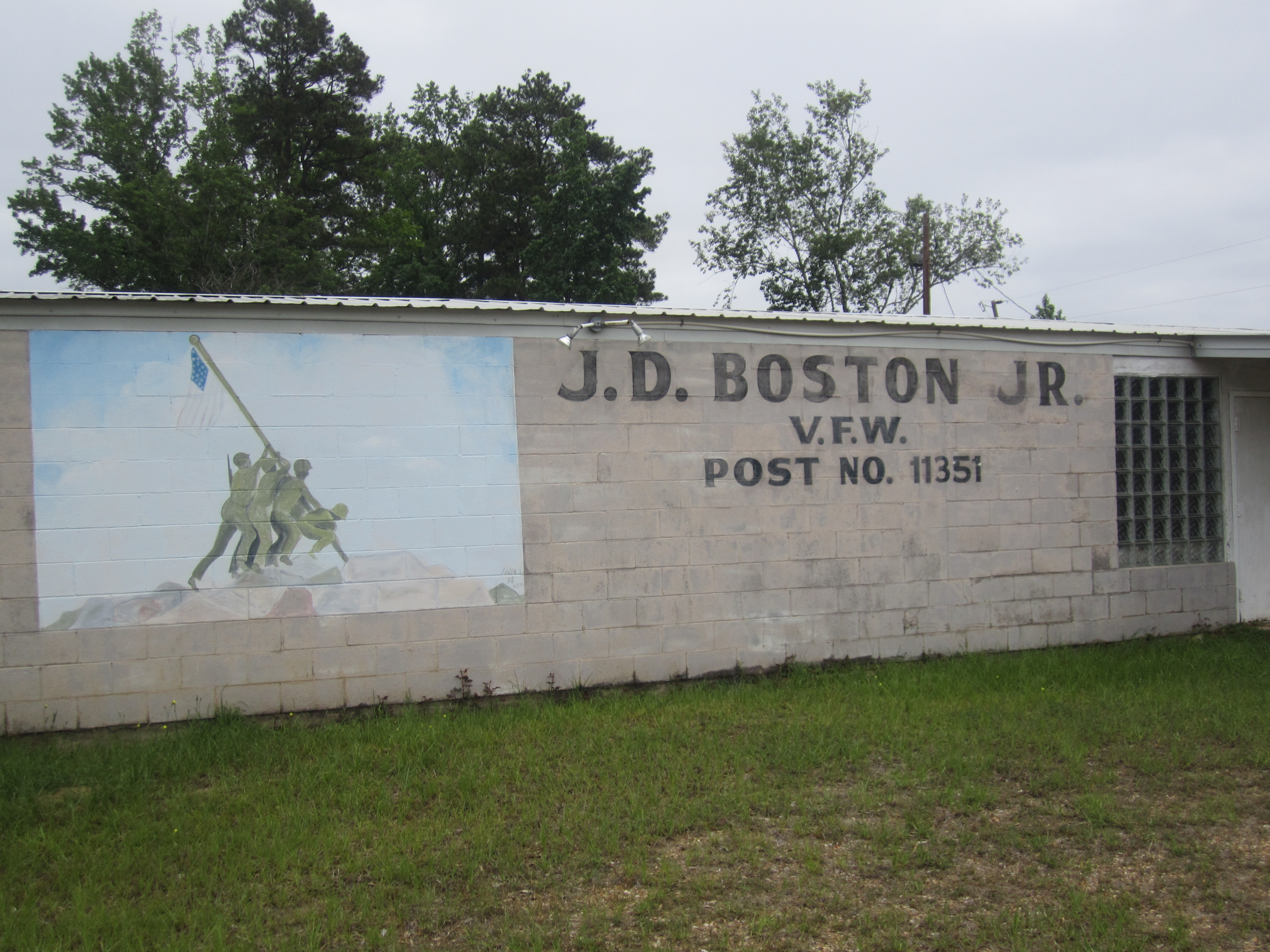
The VFW post is named for James D. Boston Jr.

One of the oldest towns in the state, the settlement today known as Montgomery was established in 1719 as a French trading post called Bon Dieu Falls. General Thomas Woodward bought the land and named it Creola Bluff in 1840. From 1860, it was renamed Montgomery and endured as an important steamboat port until the advent of the railroad in 1901.

== Geography ==
According to the United States Census Bureau, the town has a total area of 2.1 square miles (5.4 km^{2}), all land.

== Demographics ==
Historical population
Census	Pop.	Note	%±
1870	160		—
1890	144		—
1900	158		9.7%
1910	174		10.1%
1920	224		28.7%
1930	383		71.0%
1940	495		29.2%
1950	695		40.4%
1960	866		24.6%
1970	923		6.6%
1980	843		−8.7%
1990	645		−23.5%
2000	787		22.0%
2010	730		−7.2%
2020	622		−14.8%
2025 (est.)	628	▲	1.0%
U.S. Decennial Census

=== 2020 census ===
Montgomery racial composition
Race	Number	Percentage
White (non-Hispanic)	402	64.63%
Black or African American (non-Hispanic)	145	23.31%
Native American	6	0.96%
Pacific Islander	2	0.32%
Other/Mixed	59	9.49%
Hispanic or Latino	8	1.29%

As of the 2020 United States census, there were 622 people, 261 households, and 114 families residing in the town.

=== 2000 census ===
As of the census of 2000, there were 787 people, 332 households, and 210 families residing in the town. The population density was 379.0 inhabitants per square mile (146.3/km^{2}). There were 395 housing units at an average density of 190.2 units per square mile (73.4 units/km^{2}). The racial makeup of the town was 77.00% White, 20.33% African American, 0.25% Native American, 0.13% from other races, and 2.29% from two or more races. Hispanic or Latino of any race were 0.38% of the population.

There were 332 households, out of which 28.0% had children under the age of 18 living with them, 44.9% were married couples living together, 14.2% had a female householder with no husband present, and 36.7% were non-families. Nearly 32.5% of all households were made up of individuals, and 18.1% had someone living alone who was 65 years of age or older. The average household size was 2.37, and the average family size was 3.03.

In the town, the population was spread out, with 26.9% under the age of 18, 8.5% from 18 to 24, 25.2% from 25 to 44, 21.3% from 45 to 64, and 18.0% who were 65 years of age or older. The median age was 38 years. For every 100 females, there were 98.2 males. For every 100 females age 18 and over, there were 90.4 males.

The median income for a household in the town was $18,462, and the median income for a family was $23,558. Males had a median income of $28,125 versus $17,083 for females. The per capita income for the town was $11,533. About 34.0% of families and 39.6% of the population were below the poverty line, including 49.8% of those under age 18 and 32.3% of those age 65 or over.

== Community life ==
Montgomery-area churches include First Baptist, Northside Baptist, and Hargis Baptist, all Southern Baptist in affiliation, Pleasant Hill Baptist Church, Mount Vernon Baptist Church, St. Luke A.M.E. (African Methodist Episcopal) Church, St. Patrick's Roman Catholic Church, a United Methodist Church, and a Pentecostal congregation. Northside was located on the main highway during the 1990s. The new church building burned and was rebuilt on the same site at 330 Bienville Street. Hargis Church is located in the Hargis community east of Montgomery.

Local education is provided by Montgomery High School. Montgomery High School is a combination school consisting of grades six through twelve. The current enrollment (as of 2022) is approximately 241 students.

The school offers a variety of sports programs including football, basketball (girls and boys), baseball, softball, and track. Clubs offered at the school include BETA, Student Council, 4-H, Fellowship of Christian Athletes, and Healthy Living Club. In 2022, Montgomery High School won its first State Championship in the sport of softball. Currently, Montgomery High School maintains a School Performance Score of "B" by the state of Louisiana.

== Notable person ==
- A. Leonard Allen, late U.S. representative, once taught school in the Verda community east of Montgomery.

== Gallery ==
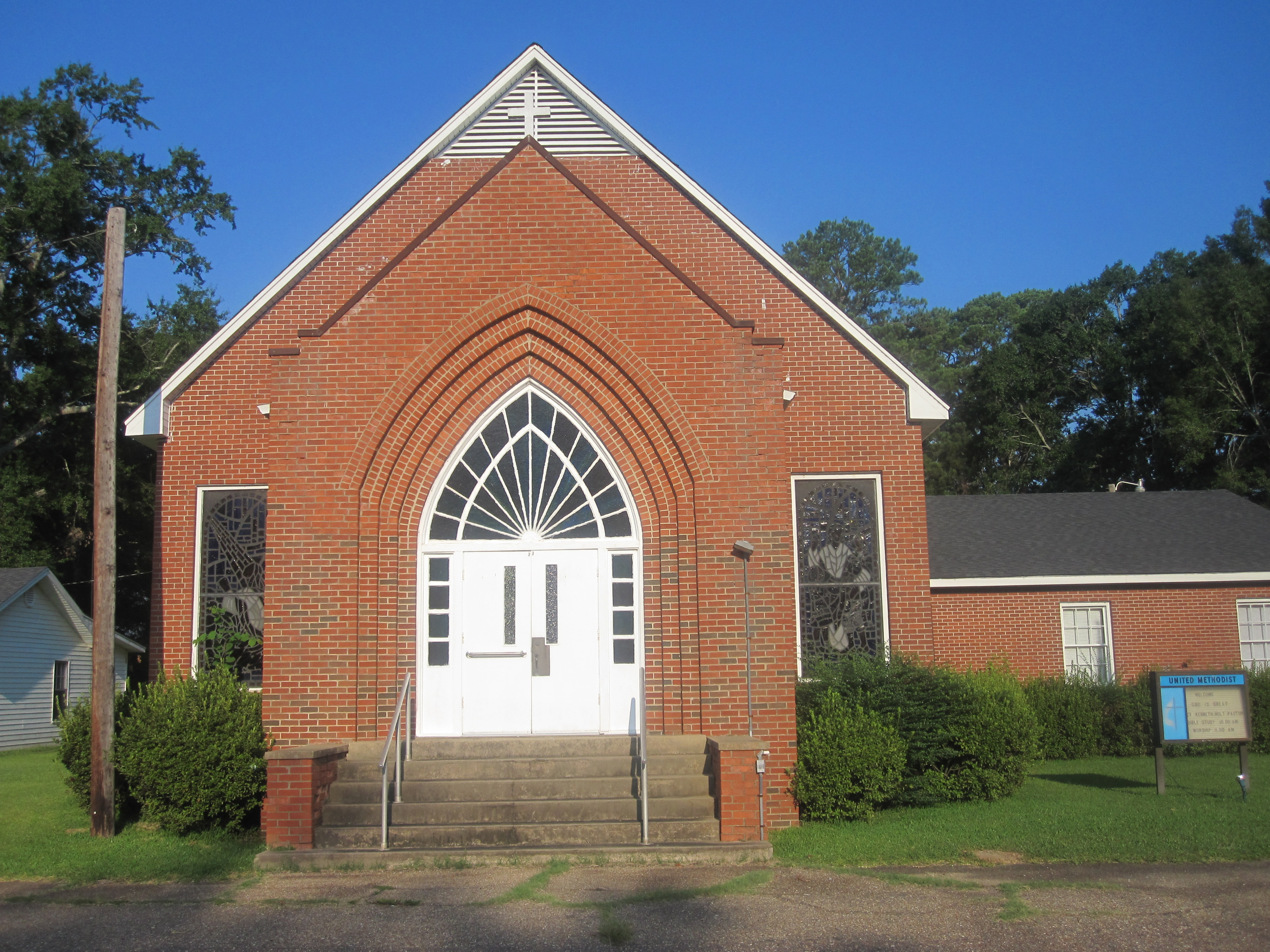
First United Methodist Church in Montgomery

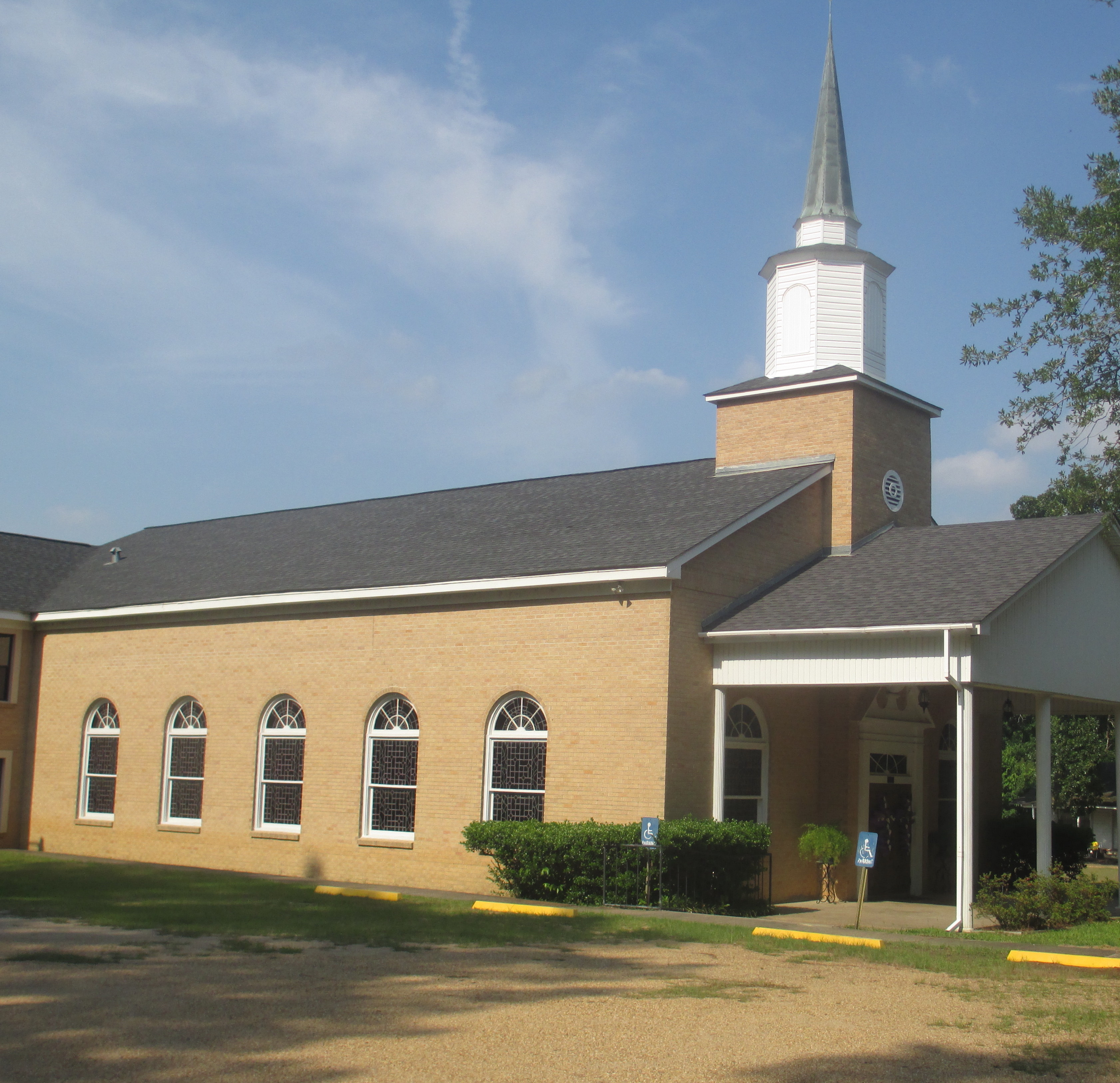
First Baptist Church, 739 Old Jefferson Highway

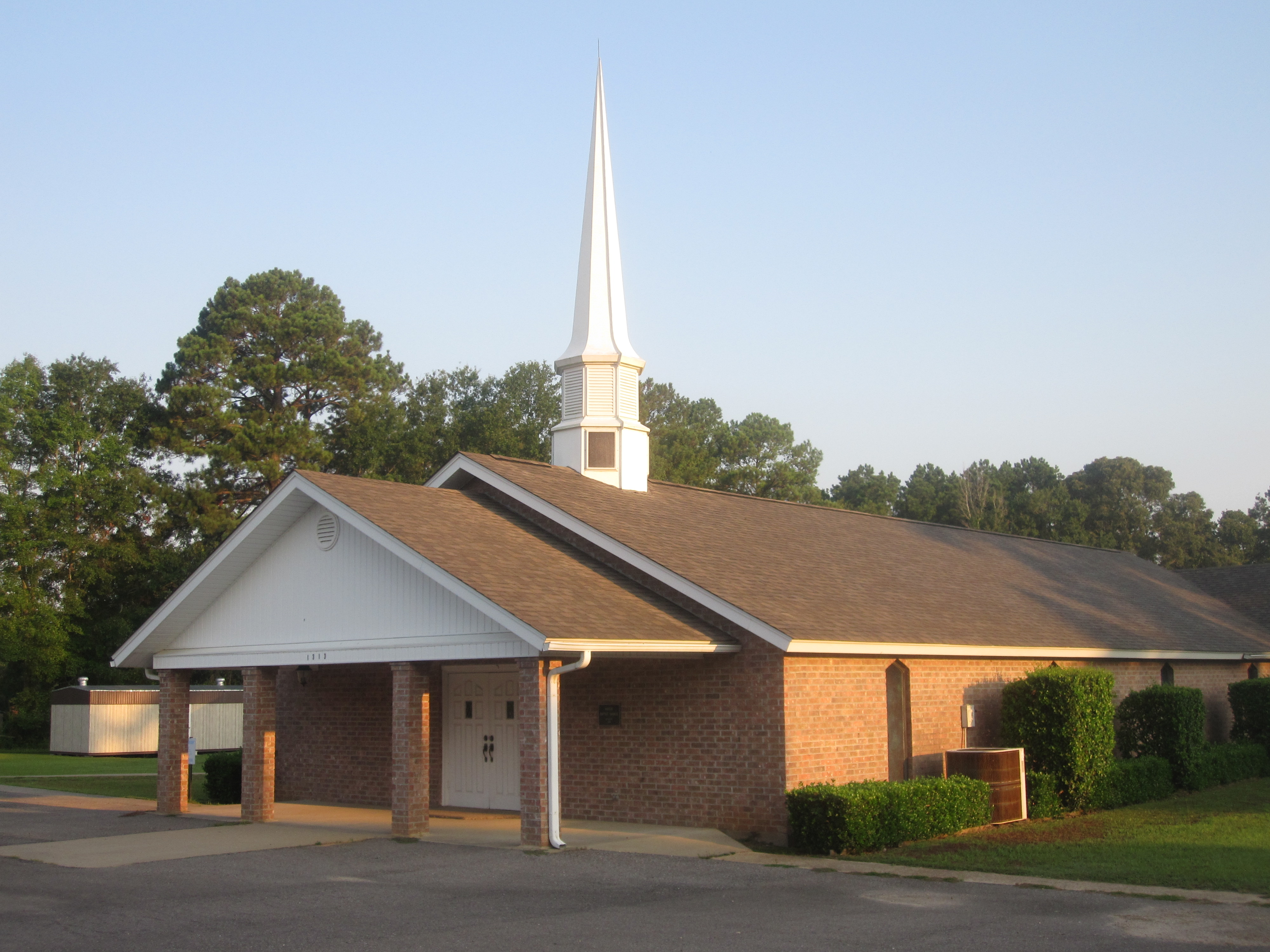
Established in 1904, the Southern Baptist Hargis Baptist Church

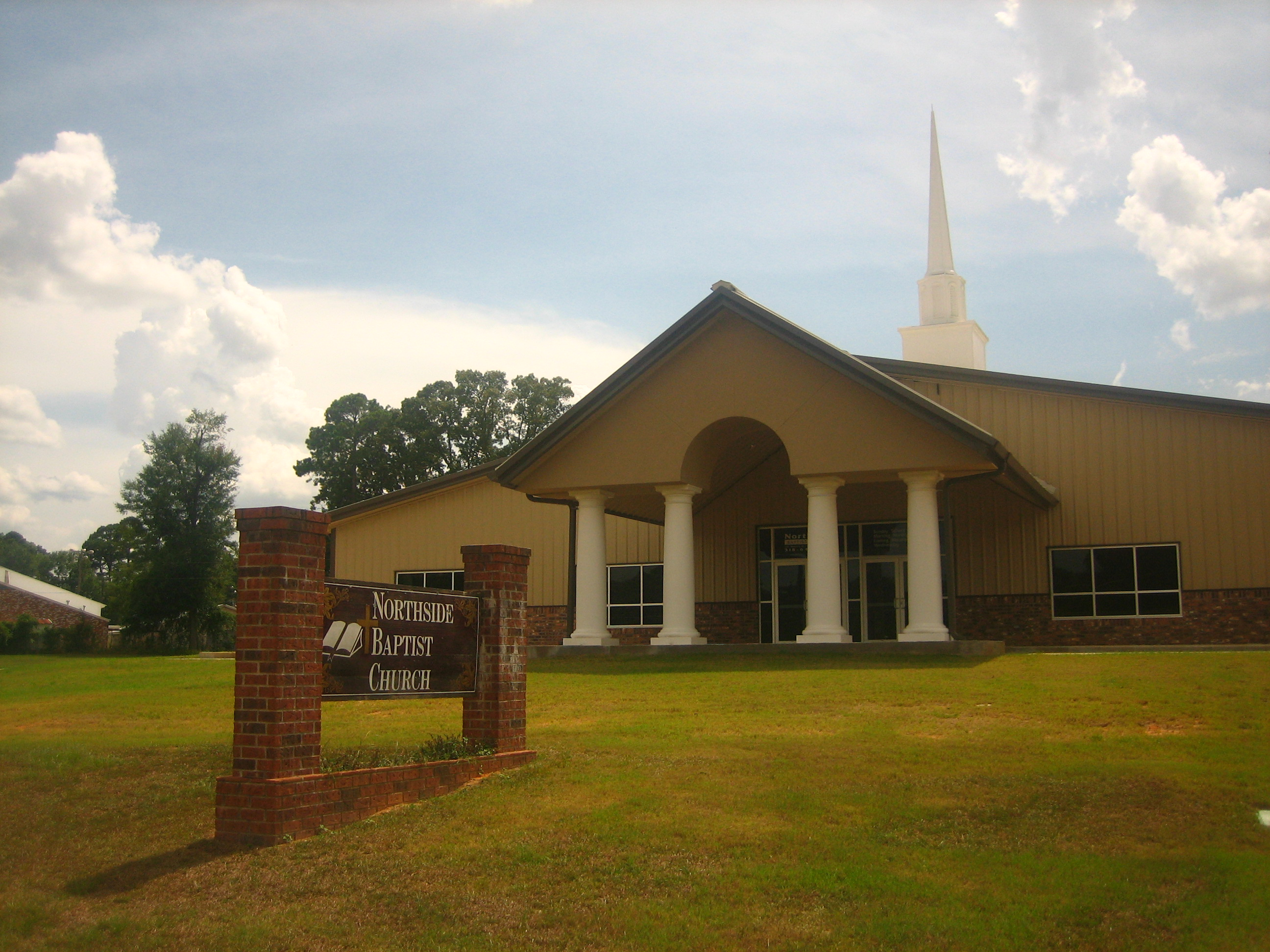
Northside Baptist Church
