= Lake Latt =

Iatt Lake
- Location within Louisiana Location within the United States
- Location: Grant Parish, Louisiana
- Coordinates: 31°36′09″N 92°39′27″W
- Type: reservoir
- Basin countries: United States
- Surface area: 6,580 acres (2,660 ha)
- Surface elevation: 82 ft (25 m)

Lake Iatt is a cypress-covered lake located in Grant Parish, Louisiana, United States. The lake is known for its largemouth bass, crappie and bream fishing. Many duck hunters also enjoy the fair population of migratory birds who pass through. There are several public boat launches for accessing the lake. It is 6,580 acres (2,660 ha).

== Improvements ==
The lake was awarded $1.14 million for flood mitigation. One sluice gate is to be replaced and installation of a new weir gate.
