= Louisiana Highway 10 =

State highway in Louisiana, United States

Louisiana Highway 10

- Route of LA 10 highlighted in red

Route information
- Maintained by Louisiana DOTD
- Length: 255.505 mi (411.195 km)
- Existed: 1955 renumbering–present
- Tourist routes: Louisiana Scenic Byways: Myths and Legends Byway; Zydeco Cajun Prairie Byway; National Scenic Byway: Great River Road; Zachary Taylor Parkway

Major junctions
- West end: US 171 south of Leesville
- US 165 in Oakdale; LA 13 north of Mamou; US 167 in Ville Platte; I-49 north of Washington; US 71 in Lebeau; LA 1 in Morganza / New Roads; US 61 in St. Francisville; I-55 / US 51 in Tangipahoa Parish; LA 16 / LA 25 in Franklinton; LA 21 in Bogalusa
- East end: MS 26 at Mississippi state line east of Bogalusa

Location
- Country: United States
- State: Louisiana
- Parishes: Vernon, Allen, Evangeline, St. Landry, Pointe Coupee, West Feliciana, East Feliciana, St. Helena, Tangipahoa, Washington

Highway system
- Louisiana State Highway System; Interstate; US; State; Scenic
← I-10	→ US 11

Louisiana Highway 10 (LA 10) is a state highway located in southern Louisiana. It runs 255.51 miles (411.20 km) in an east–west direction from U.S. Highway 171 (US 171) south of Leesville to the Mississippi state line east of Bogalusa.

The route connects a string of small towns and cities across the Central Louisiana, Acadiana, and Florida Parishes regions of the state. It runs parallel and to the north of the busier US 190 corridor. LA 10 crosses the Mississippi River via the John James Audubon Bridge, the only such crossing between Baton Rouge and Natchez, Mississippi. The western terminus in Vernon Parish comes within 15 miles (24 km) of reaching the Sabine River at the Texas state line and making LA 10 a true cross-state route.

During its lengthy route, LA 10 traverses ten parishes and connects six parish seats, including Ville Platte, New Roads, St. Francisville, Clinton, Greensburg, and Franklinton. It also passes through the cities of Oakdale and Bogalusa as well as towns such as Washington and Jackson. LA 10 intersects most of the state's major north–south highways, including Interstate 49 (I-49), Interstate 55 (I-55), US 51, US 61, US 71, US 165, US 167, and US 171.

Since the end of 2010, LA 10 has existed in two disconnected sections as the Melville Ferry service across the Atchafalaya River was discontinued. The nearest bridge crossing is on US 190 at Krotz Springs, 16.5 miles (26.6 km) to the south via LA 77 and LA 81. Alternately, motorists may cross the river via LA 1 at Simmesport, 21.5 miles (34.6 km) to the north.

== Route description ==
=== Western terminus to Ville Platte ===
From the west, LA 10 begins at an intersection with US 171 in Pickering, a point in Vernon Parish located between DeRidder and Leesville. It proceeds east as an undivided two-lane highway, immediately crossing the Kansas City Southern Railway (KCS) tracks, and passes along the southern edge of the U.S. Army base at Fort Johnson. LA 10 then turns to the southeast for 5.6 miles (9.0 km) and passes through the Vernon Unit of the Kisatchie National Forest. Curving back to the east, the highway continues 10.0 miles (16.1 km) before intersecting LA 399 in an area known as Cravens. After a brief concurrency with LA 10, LA 399 turns to the northeast toward Fullerton Lake. East of Cravens, LA 10 curves to the southeast and passes through the small community of Pitkin. Here, it intersects LA 113, which heads south to US 190 in Reeves. LA 10 and LA 113 proceed eastward out of Pitkin together. LA 113 then splits to the northeast toward Glenmora while LA 10 heads southeast through Dido and into Allen Parish.

Just across the parish line, LA 10 passes along the north side of the town of Elizabeth and has a brief concurrency with LA 112, which connects to DeRidder on the west and Union Hill on the east. LA 10 continues southeast for about 7.0 miles (11.3 km) and crosses a bridge over the Calcasieu River. Shortly afterward, the highway enters the city of Oakdale, widening to an undivided four-lane highway with center turning lane, and curves due east. LA 10 intersects US 165, which parallels the Union Pacific Railroad (UPRR) tracks. US 165 connects to Alexandria on the northeast and Lake Charles on the southwest. After passing along the southern edge of the downtown area, LA 10 intersects LA 372 (South 21st Street). The highway narrows to two lanes shortly before crossing the city limits and heads toward the parish line.

After crossing into Evangeline Parish, LA 10 intersects LA 106 at a point known as Beaver. LA 106 heads due east toward Pine Prairie while LA 10 begins to make a long bend to the south through a sparsely populated area. 9.4 miles (15.1 km) later, the route resumes its eastward course. At Barber Spur, LA 10 intersects LA 13 a distance of 3.3 miles (5.3 km) north of Mamou. LA 13 connects to Alexandria on the north as well as Eunice and Crowley on the south. Shortly after this intersection, LA 10 passes the Mamou Municipal Airport and intersects LA 376 in Vidrine. 5.3 miles (8.5 km) later, LA 10 intersects and begins a concurrency with US 167 at the western edge of Ville Platte, the parish seat.

=== Ville Platte to Melville ===
US 167 and LA 10 enter Ville Platte on West Main Street as an undivided four-lane highway with center turning lane, but the roadway soon separates to follow Main Street eastbound and LaSalle Street westbound, becoming a divided four-lane highway. Passing through the commercial section of town, the highway crosses the Acadiana Railway (AKDN) tracks and intersects LA 29 (South Chataignier Street). LA 29 begins a brief concurrency with US 167 and LA 10 before turning north onto Tate Cove Road. At this intersection, signs direct motorists to follow LA 29 northbound to reach I-49. Shortly afterward, the one-way couplet ends as US 167 and LA 10 proceed eastward out of Ville Platte as an undivided four-lane highway with center turning lane once again. Just outside the city limits, the highway narrows to two lanes and then curves to the southeast at LA 748 (Grand Prairie Road) en route to the St. Landry Parish line.

In St. Landry Parish, US 167 and LA 10 intersect and briefly run concurrently with LA 103 south of Grand Prairie. After proceeding southeast through Plaisance, the route intersects LA 749, which heads south into Opelousas. Shortly afterward, at a point known as Nuba, the long concurrency of US 167 and LA 10 ends at an intersection with LA 182. US 167 continues east a short distance to I-49 and follows the interstate through Opelousas to Lafayette. Meanwhile, LA 10 turns north to follow LA 182 into the small town of Washington, situated on Bayou Courtableau. The route passes through the historic town center along Main Street and intersects LA 103, the town's connection to I-49, a second time. LA 10 and LA 182 proceed northeast across a bridge over Bayou Courtableau, exiting Washington. 1.7 miles (2.7 km) later, after curving due north, the route enters into an interchange with I-49 at Exit 27, connecting to Opelousas and Alexandria. After intersecting LA 745 (Thistlethwaite Boy Scout Camp Road) at Macland, LA 10 and LA 182 separate at a point known as Beggs.

LA 10 curves to the northeast toward Lebeau where it intersects US 71, connecting to Alexandria via Bunkie on the northwest and Krotz Springs on the southeast. From this intersection, LA 10 turns east and closely parallels the Union Pacific Railroad tracks through the village of Palmetto. Over the next 8.3 miles (13.4 km), LA 10 travels through a largely unpopulated area that is part of the Atchafalaya Basin. The route continues along the UPRR tracks into the town of Melville where it becomes known as Lafleur Street. At Fontenot Street, LA 10 intersects and begins a brief concurrency with LA 105, a highway that generally runs along the west bank levee of the Atchafalaya River. LA 105 turns north onto Landrum Street and crosses under the UPRR tracks while LA 10 proceeds over the levee to a dead end at the Atchafalaya River, which forms the boundary between St. Landry Parish and Pointe Coupee Parish.

=== Atchafalaya River to Mississippi River ===
The route resumes as a gravel road on the east bank of the Atchafalaya River in an area of Pointe Coupee Parish known as Red Cross. LA 10 curves to the north while crossing the river levee. Now running parallel with the levee, the highway passes underneath the Union Pacific Railroad bridge. Shortly afterward, it turns east while LA 417 continues the route north along the levee. Over the next 4.0 miles (6.4 km), LA 10 proceeds east along Laio Road through the largely unpopulated Morganza Spillway. The highway makes a bend to the south through Ravenswood then resumes an eastward course and intersects LA 77. This section of LA 77, forming its northern terminus, is unsigned and also sports a gravel surface. LA 10 turns north, continuing the route of LA 77, and curves to the east across a second levee to exit the Morganza Spillway. It immediately intersects LA 77 Spur, a paved highway signed as the mainline route. Motorists are directed to turn south onto this route to reach US 190. From this intersection, LA 10 turns north and becomes a paved highway once again. The route follows alongside Bayou Fordoche as it bends to the east toward the village of Morganza, located on the west bank of the Mississippi River. Here, LA 10 crosses the Kansas City Southern Railway tracks and intersects LA 1, which heads northwest through Simmesport.

LA 10 turns to the southeast and begins a concurrency with LA 1 along the railroad line for a distance of 7.8 miles (12.6 km) into the small city of New Roads, the parish seat. Along the way, the route intersects LA 420 (Pointe Coupee Road), which connects to various points along the Mississippi River. LA 1 and LA 10 cross the New Roads city limits just after passing the False River Regional Airport. The concurrency ends as LA 1 turns south onto Hospital Road, bypassing the town. LA 10 continues ahead co-signed with LA 1 Bus. to an intersection with Parent Street. The business routes of LA 1 and LA 10 head southeast on Parent Street into town while mainline LA 10 travels along a northern bypass of the downtown area. 2.3 miles (3.7 km) later, LA 10 Bus. rejoins the main route at a second intersection with LA 420. LA 10 proceeds eastward for 4.4 miles (7.1 km), traveling over a railroad overpass, to the foot of the John James Audubon Bridge over the Mississippi River. Just before crossing the bridge, a frontage road leads to LA 981, which follows alongside the river levee. LA 10 widens to a divided four-lane highway as it follows the cable-stayed bridge across the river and crosses into West Feliciana Parish.

=== St. Francisville to Interstate 55 ===
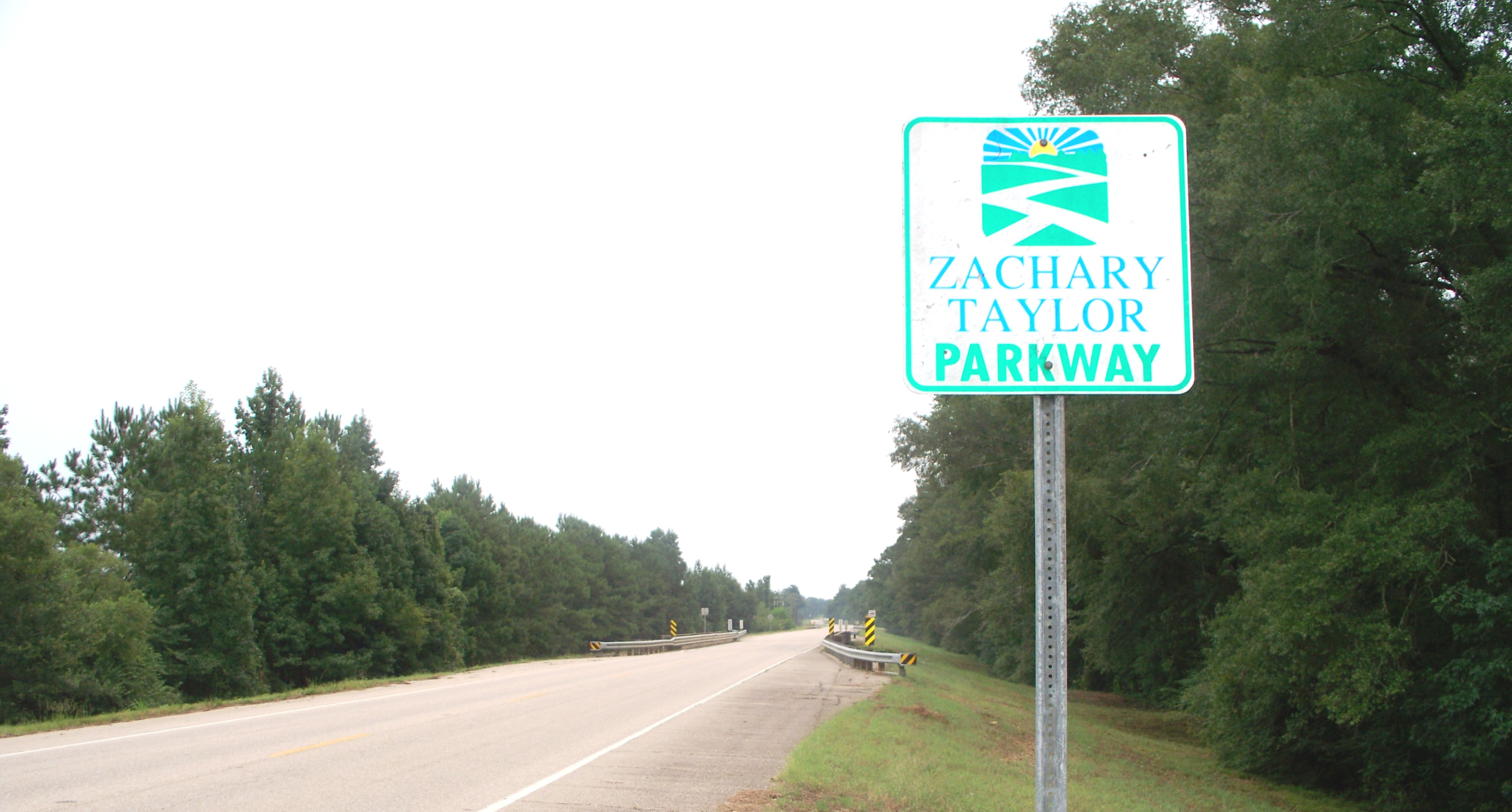
A marker on eastbound LA 10 between Clinton and Greensburg identifying the route as part of the Zachary Taylor Parkway.

LA 10 returns to grade after 2.3 miles (3.7 km) as an undivided two-lane highway and curves to the northeast through a rural and forested area. 2.6 miles (4.2 km) later, the route reaches an intersection with US 61 in an area known as Starhill. LA 10 turns northwest to follow US 61, becoming a divided four-lane highway. US 61 and LA 10 intersect the rural highways LA 966 and LA 965 on the way to the parish seat, the small town of St. Francisville. Crossing the town limits, the median transitions to a center turning lane, and an intersection with Commerce Street connects with the historic center of town. As the center lane disappears, US 61 and LA 10 proceed northwest a short distance to a four-way intersection at Jackson Road. Here, US 61 heads northward toward the Mississippi state line while LA 10 turns northeast toward Jackson. LA 10 continues northeast as an undivided two-lane highway through rural West Feliciana Parish for 6.8 miles (10.9 km), passing through Elm Park to a point known as Carney, where the highway curves to the east. 3.5 miles (5.6 km) later, it reaches a second intersection LA 965. LA 10 then intersects LA 421 just before crossing a bridge over Thompson Creek and into the East Feliciana Parish town of Jackson.

LA 10 travels through Jackson on Charter Street, the town's central thoroughfare. After several blocks, it intersects LA 952 (College Street). At the eastern edge of town is an intersection with LA 68 (Carrs Creek Road), connecting to Wilson on the north and Baton Rouge via US 61 on the south. 3.2 miles (5.1 km) east of Jackson, LA 10 crosses over the Gloster Southern Railroad (GLSR) line at a point known as McManus. Shortly afterward, the highway intersects LA 19, another north–south route connecting to Baton Rouge and Wilson. After heading northeast for 3.0 miles (4.8 km), LA 10 curves due east at an intersection with LA 963. The highway passes between a residential development and a large tract of open land shortly before intersecting LA 955, which heads south through Grays to a point near Slaughter. 1.5 miles (2.4 km) later, LA 10 enters Clinton, the parish seat, running along St. Helena Street. LA 10 intersects LA 67 at Liberty Street, and the two highways run concurrent for two blocks until LA 67 turns south onto Plank Road, the town's main connection to Baton Rouge. On the way out of Clinton, LA 10 curves to the northeast and continues for 10.0 miles (16.1 km) before crossing the Amite River into St. Helena Parish.

After entering rural western St. Helena Parish, LA 10 curves to the southeast and intersects LA 38 at Coleman Town, south of Chipola, followed by LA 448 at Darlington. LA 448 connects with LA 37 to Baton Rouge. Continuing southeast, LA 10 intersects LA 1043 to Liverpool. 5.0 miles (8.0 km) later, LA 10 enters Greensburg, the parish seat, and becomes known as Main Street. Nearing the center of town, LA 10 intersects LA 37 itself, followed by LA 43 (Kendrick Street) four blocks later. LA 43 zigzags onto LA 10 for one block then turns south onto Sitman Street toward Montpelier. Outside the town limits, LA 10 intersects LA 10 Spur, an alternate route into Greensburg from the east. Heading out of St. Helena Parish, LA 10 intersects and has a brief concurrency with LA 441, a rural highway.

=== Tangipahoa Parish to Bogalusa ===
Shortly after crossing into Tangipahoa Parish, LA 10 passes through an interchange with I-55 at Exit 53, connecting to Hammond on the south and Jackson, Mississippi on the north. Proceeding due east, LA 10 intersects US 51 at Fluker and turns south to follow that highway, running parallel to the Canadian National Railway (CNRR) tracks. After 3.1 miles (5.0 km), the route intersects LA 1048, which leads to another interchange with I-55. Just south of this intersection, at a point known as Arcola, LA 10 resumes its eastward course and separates from US 51, which continues south through Roseland and Amite City toward Hammond. After crossing a bridge over the Tangipahoa River, LA 10 begins to travel in a general northeastern direction and intersects the rural highways LA 1058, LA 1054, and LA 1061 over the next 8.3 miles (13.4 km). The latter junction is located in an area known as Wilmer, and LA 10 continues eastward for 4.4 miles (7.1 km) before crossing the Tchefuncte River into Washington Parish.

Just across the parish line, LA 10 intersects LA 450 at Stoney Point. LA 450 connects to Sunny Hill on the north and Folsom on the south. Soon afterward, the highway curves to the northeast toward Richardson, where it intersects LA 440. LA 10 turns east to continue the route of that highway toward Franklinton. On the way, LA 10 intersects the concurrent LA 16 and LA 25, connecting to Amite City and Folsom, respectively. LA 10 turns northeast to join the concurrency across the Bogue Chitto River and into Franklinton, the parish seat. The route immediately curves into the downtown area and intersects Main Street, where LA 16 and LA 25 turn off to the south and north, respectively. LA 10 continues along Washington Street and intersects LA 436 (Mott Street) then curves eastward through the east side of town. Beyond Franklinton, LA 10 passes through a sparsely populated area, and after 6.1 miles (9.8 km), it intersects LA 439. Soon afterward, LA 10 intersects LA 62 at Sheridan. LA 62 heads northward through the community of Pine. LA 10 curves to the southeast and passes along the edge of the Ben's Creek Wildlife Management Area.

After 8.1 miles (13.0 km), LA 10 crosses into the northwest corner of the city of Bogalusa. The highway enters town on Sunset Drive then zigzags south onto Rio Grande Street and east onto Superior Avenue. At Shenandoah Street, LA 10 intersects LA 60. The highway briefly widens to four lanes as it passes through a commercial area and crosses the Canadian National Railway tracks. LA 10 proceeds briefly onto Carolina Avenue before turning northeast onto Louisiana Avenue, a divided two-lane residential thoroughfare. After several blocks, LA 10 intersects LA 21 (North Columbia Street), which connects to Covington on the southwest and Columbia, Mississippi on the north. The median disappears as LA 10 passes Ponemah Cemetery and becomes an undivided two-lane highway once again. Less than 1.0 mile (1.6 km) east of the Bogalusa city limits, LA 10 crosses a bridge over the Pearl River and into the state of Mississippi, where it continues as Mississippi Highway 26 (MS 26) toward Poplarville.

=== Route classification and data ===
LA 10 serves as the principal east–west route for many of the small towns and cities it traverses. Roughly half of the route is classified by the Louisiana Department of Transportation and Development (La DOTD) as a rural minor arterial. Portions of the route running through sparsely populated areas or areas otherwise served by the interstate highway system are often classified as major collectors. The very lightly populated and travelled section immediately east of the Atchafalaya River is a minor collector. However, several brief stretches of LA 10 serve as principal arterials, such as the portion running through Bogalusa and the concurrencies with US 61 and US 167 through St. Francisville and Ville Platte, respectively.

Daily traffic volume in 2013 averaged between 3,000 and 5,000 vehicles for most of the rural portions of the route. The highest numbers reported were between 14,000 and 17,000 vehicles for the US 167 concurrency east of Ville Platte; 13,000 through Franklinton; and 11,700 for the US 61 concurrency near St. Francisville. The lowest numbers were reported on either side of the break in the route at the Atchafalaya River, averaging between 1,000 and 2,000 vehicles. The portion immediately east of the river between Red Cross and LA 77 averaged less than 200 vehicles. The posted speed limit is usually 55 mph (90 km/h) in rural areas, reduced to between 25 mph (40 km/h) and 35 mph (55 km/h) through town.

Several stretches of LA 10 are included in the state's system of tourist routes known as the Louisiana Scenic Byways. These consist of the Myths and Legends Byway west of Oakdale and the Zydeco Cajun Prairie Byway between Ville Platte and Melville. A short section of the route between New Roads and St. Francisville is also part of the ten-state National Scenic Byway known as the Great River Road. This includes the John James Audubon Bridge across the Mississippi River, which is used as a connector between the west and east bank routes of the Great River Road. Additionally, the entirety of LA 10 east of Morganza is part of the Zachary Taylor Parkway, an ongoing parkway project first designated by the state legislature in 1992.

== History ==
=== Pre-1955 route numbering ===
In the original Louisiana Highway system in use between 1921 and 1955, the modern LA 10 was part of several different state highways. West of the Mississippi River, these consist of State Route 257 from the western terminus at Pickering to Sandy Hill; State Route 118 to Cravens; State Route 22 to the modern junction with LA 749 west of Nuba; State Route 217 to Nuba; State Route 5 to Beggs; State Route 27 to Lebeau; State Route 1 to the modern junction with LA 77 east of Ravenswood; State Route 41 to Morganza; and State Route 30 to New Roads. The modern route bypassing New Roads and crossing the Mississippi River by bridge to US 61 at Starhill did not exist during the pre-1955 era.

East of the Mississippi River, the pre-1955 state highway designations consist of State Route 3 from Starhill to St. Francisville; State Route 35 to Fluker; State Routes 33 and 35 concurrently from Fluker to Arcola; State Route 302 to Richardson; State Route 137 to the modern junction with LA 16 / LA 25 west of Franklinton; State Routes 34 and 35 concurrently into Franklinton; and State Route 35 for the remainder of the distance to the Mississippi state line east of Bogalusa.

All of the above highway routes were designated by acts of the state legislature between 1921 and 1928. The portions of the routes used by the modern LA 10 remained largely consistent up to the 1955 Louisiana Highway renumbering with the exception of former Route 22 through Allen Parish. The original highway followed the present LA 1156 through Elizabeth and then travelled along section line roads south and east into Oakdale. The present diagonal route connecting Elizabeth and Oakdale was laid out alongside an existing railroad line and opened around 1941.

=== Post-1955 route history ===
LA 10 was created in the 1955 renumbering, largely combining the routes of former State Routes 22 and 35. Pieces of important cross-state routes such as former State Routes 1 and 5, as well as short connectors such as former State Routes 27, 41, and 257 were used to create a continuous route running north of and parallel to the existing US 190 corridor across the state.

Class "A": La 10—From a junction with La-US 171 at or near Pickering through or near Pitkin, Elizabeth, Oakdale, Ville Platte and Washington to a junction with La-US 71 at or near Lebeau and from a junction with LA 19 at or near McManus through or near Clinton, Greensburg, Fluker, Franklinton and Bogalusa to the Mississippi State Line east of Bogalusa.
Class "B": La 10—From a junction with La-US 71 at or near Lebeau through or near Melville, Morganza, New Roads, St. Francisville and Jackson to a junction with La 19 at or near McManus.

— 1955 legislative route description

Despite its length, most of the route of LA 10 has remained the same since 1955. The only major change has been the bypassing of New Roads and St. Francisville resulting from the construction of a cable-stayed bridge across the Mississippi River that replaced the toll ferry connecting the two communities.

==== John James Audubon Bridge ====
Until 2011, LA 10 followed the current business route through New Roads. It then crossed the present alignment north of town and followed what is now LA 420 and LA 981 to the former ferry landing opposite St. Francisville. After crossing the river by ferry, LA 10 continued on Ferdinand Street through St. Francisville to the present junction of US 61 and LA 10. The John James Audubon Bridge across the Mississippi River was constructed between May 2006 and February 2012 at a location 3.6 miles (5.8 km) downriver from the toll ferry service. In May 2011, the bridge was opened to traffic early when high water during the 2011 Mississippi River floods caused ferry operations to be suspended. The New Roads–St. Francisville Ferry was permanently discontinued with the opening of the bridge.

The bridge project resulted in a realignment of several highway routes in the area. A northern bypass of New Roads was constructed to link LA 10 with the bridge, and the old route through town was designated as LA 10 Bus. LA 420 and LA 981 were extended to cover the remainder of the old route on the north side of the present route. At the same time, LA 1 was re-routed onto Hospital Road, a bypass formerly designated as LA 3131, on the west side of New Roads. Its former route through town became LA 1 Bus., sharing pavement with LA 10 Bus. On the opposite side of the river, a new highway was constructed to connect the Audubon Bridge with US 61 at Starhill, and LA 10 now followed US 61 into St. Francisville. The old route of LA 10 through town was renumbered as LA 1263 for several years until being transferred to local control in 2018.

==== Other improvements ====
The remaining route changes have mostly resulted from the construction of small sections of roadway to eliminate zigzags through several towns. The entire route through Oakdale was relocated along a former railroad right-of-way during the 2000s, eliminating six right-angle turns east of US 165. The original 1955 route entered town on 6th Avenue and turned south onto 13th Street, east onto 5th Avenue, south onto Irene Street, east onto Jackson Street, south onto Mill Street, and east onto South Street, continuing across LA 372 (21st Street) onto Old LA 10 to rejoin the present alignment. Later, the route was slightly altered to follow Jackson Street directly to 21st Street, turning south to Old LA 10 and eliminating two of the turns. The current route provides a streamlined four-lane corridor throughout Oakdale.

In Greensburg, a zigzag was eliminated when a new highway segment was opened in 1994 leading eastward out of town. The old route has been retained as LA 10 Spur. Two zigzags were eliminated in Bogalusa at the Canadian National (formerly the Gulf, Mobile and Ohio Railroad) crossing. LA 10 originally curved north onto Cumberland Street just past the intersection with LA 60 then turned east to cross the railroad tracks on Ontario Avenue. The route then turned south onto Austin Street and east onto Carolina Avenue, proceeding along the current alignment. An eastward extension of Superior Avenue has streamlined this part of the route.

Two bridge replacements in East Feliciana Parish have also eliminated zigzags through towns. LA 10 originally entered Jackson on a now-demolished bridge aligned with Sycamore Street, necessitating a jog onto Charter Street, the main thoroughfare. The present bridge crossing aligned with Charter Street was constructed in 1959. The approach roads to the old bridge still exist in an abandoned state. More recently, the original bridge crossing into Clinton was also replaced. Prior to 2005, LA 10 entered town on Jackson Street and turned north onto Bank Street before proceeding east on St. Helena Street.

An additional improvement has been the widening of the Ville Platte corridor to four lanes around 1982 by diverting westbound traffic onto LaSalle Street, located two blocks north of Main Street which previously carried two-way traffic. Finally, the present bridge over the Pearl River at the Mississippi state line was constructed in 1998, replacing the original span that existed just to the north. The old approach road on the Louisiana side is still in use as a local road, including a smaller span over Peters Lake.

==== Melville Ferry closure ====
On December 31, 2010, the Melville Ferry service across the Atchafalaya River between St. Landry and Pointe Coupee Parishes was discontinued, effectively cutting the route of LA 10 in half. The ferry service and adjoining portions of LA 10 were once part of the main highway route between Baton Rouge and Alexandria and, on a larger scale, New Orleans and Shreveport. When the original state highway system was created in 1921, it was designated as part of State Route 1, which followed the Jefferson Highway auto trail. Five years later, it became the original route of US 71 when the U.S. Highway System was created. It was bypassed as a major through route during the 1930s when bridges were constructed on the present US 190 at Krotz Springs and LA 1 at Simmesport. A bridge at Melville never came to fruition, and the ferry served a small number of travelers until its ultimate closure at the end of 2010.

== Future ==
La DOTD is currently engaged in a program that aims to transfer about 5,000 miles (8,000 km) of state-owned roadways to local governments over the next several years. Under this plan of "right-sizing" the state highway system, two short sections of LA 10 are proposed for deletion as they do not meet a significant interurban travel function. In St. Landry Parish, the portion of LA 10 from Nuba to I-49 north of Washington is to be eliminated. This section of the route runs concurrent with LA 182 and is paralleled by I-49. The remaining portion of LA 10 to be deleted consists of the roadway sections that served the defunct Melville Ferry in Pointe Coupee Parish. It exists on either side of the Atchafalaya River, extending from LA 105 in Melville to LA 417 in Red Cross.

== Major intersections ==
Parish	Location	mi	km	Destinations	Notes
Vernon	Pickering	0.000– 0.017	0.000– 0.027	US 171 (Lake Charles Highway) – Leesville, DeRidder	Western terminus; to Fort Johnson main gate
Vernon	Cravens	16.683	26.849	LA 399 south	Western end of LA 399 concurrency
Vernon	Cravens	17.532	28.215	LA 399 north	Eastern end of LA 399 concurrency
Vernon	Pitkin	23.096	37.169	LA 113 south – Reeves LA 458 west (Fullerton Blacktop Road)	Western end of LA 113 concurrency; eastern terminus of LA 458
Vernon	Pitkin	23.164	37.279	LA 463 north	Southern terminus of LA 463
Vernon		24.855	40.000	LA 113 north – Glenmora	Eastern end of LA 113 concurrency
Vernon	Dido	26.613	42.829	LA 377 south (Dido Loop)	Northern terminus of LA 377
Allen	Elizabeth	32.065	51.604	LA 112 south – DeRidder	Western end of LA 112 concurrency
Allen	Elizabeth	33.202	53.433	LA 112 north – Union Hill LA 3206 south	Eastern end of LA 112 concurrency; northern terminus of LA 3206
Allen		39.417	63.436	LA 3205 (South River Road)	Northern terminus of LA 3205
Allen		40.259– 40.513	64.791– 65.199	Bridge over Calcasieu River	
Allen	Oakdale	41.767	67.217	US 165 – Alexandria, Lake Charles	
Allen	Oakdale	42.789	68.862	LA 372 south (South 21st Street)	Northern terminus of LA 372
Evangeline	Beaver	47.578	76.569	LA 106 east (Beaver Road) – Pine Prairie	Western terminus of LA 106
Evangeline	Barber Spur	60.603	97.531	LA 13 (Veterans Memorial Highway) – Pine Prairie, Eunice, Alexandria	
Evangeline	Barber Spur	60.693– 60.745	97.676– 97.760	LA 3149 (Old Highway 13)	Northern terminus of LA 3149
Evangeline	Vidrine	62.404	100.430	LA 376 (Tiger Lane, Heritage Road)	
Evangeline	Ville Platte	67.623– 67.767	108.829– 109.060	US 167 north – Alexandria	Western end of US 167 concurrency
Evangeline	Ville Platte	67.803	109.118	LA 3097 (Snooks Road)	Northern terminus of LA 3097
Evangeline	Ville Platte	69.477	111.812	LA 3042 (North Dupre Street) – Chicot State Park	Southern terminus of LA 3042
Evangeline	Ville Platte	70.243	113.045	LA 29 south (Chataignier Street)	Western end of LA 29 concurrency
Evangeline	Ville Platte	70.631	113.670	LA 29 north (Tate Cove Road) – Bunkie	Eastern end of LA 29 concurrency
Evangeline	Ville Platte	71.738	115.451	LA 1168 (Belaire Cove Road) – Belaire Cove	Western terminus of LA 1168
Evangeline		72.961– 73.008	117.419– 117.495	LA 748 (Grand Prairie Road) – Grand Prairie, Washington	Western terminus of LA 748
St. Landry		76.687	123.416	LA 103 north (Grand Prairie Highway) – Grand Prairie, Washington	Western end of LA 103 concurrency
St. Landry		78.128	125.735	LA 103 south (Prairie Ronde Highway) – Prairie Ronde, Lawtell	Eastern end of LA 103 concurrency
St. Landry		83.133– 83.226	133.790– 133.939	LA 749	Northern terminus of LA 749
St. Landry	Nuba	84.681– 84.713	136.281– 136.332	US 167 south – Lafayette LA 182 south – Opelousas	Eastern end of US 167 concurrency; western end of LA 182 concurrency
St. Landry	Washington	87.020– 87.066	140.045– 140.119	LA 103 (St. Landry Veterans Memorial Highway, West DeJean Street) to I-49 – Grand Prairie, Port Barre	One-way pair to the east
St. Landry		87.267	140.443	LA 745	Southern terminus of LA 745
St. Landry		88.796– 89.165	142.903– 143.497	I-49 – Opelousas, Alexandria	Exit 27 on I-49
St. Landry	Macland	90.192	145.150	LA 745 (Thistlethwaite Boy Scout Camp Road)	Northern terminus of LA 745
St. Landry	Beggs	91.646	147.490	LA 182 north	Eastern end of LA 182 concurrency
St. Landry		95.360	153.467	LA 359	Northern terminus of LA 359
St. Landry	Lebeau	97.574– 97.597	157.030– 157.067	US 71 north – Alexandria	Western end of US 71 concurrency
St. Landry	Lebeau	97.744	157.304	US 71 south – Krotz Springs	Eastern end of US 71 concurrency
St. Landry		102.982	165.733	LA 360 – Bayou Current, Simmesport	Southern terminus of LA 360; 0.6 miles (0.97 km) east of Palmetto
St. Landry	Melville	111.986	180.224	LA 105 south (Fontenot Street) to US 190 – Krotz Springs	Western end of LA 105 concurrency
St. Landry	Melville	112.214	180.591	LA 105 north (Landrum Street) – Bayou Current, Simmesport	Eastern end of LA 105 concurrency
Atchafalaya River		112.378	180.855	Gap in LA 10; dead end at abandoned Melville Ferry landing	
Pointe Coupee	Red Cross	112.836	181.592	LA 417	Southern terminus of LA 417
Pointe Coupee		116.875	188.092	LA 77 to US 190	Northern terminus of LA 77
Pointe Coupee		117.992– 118.014	189.890– 189.925	LA 77 Spur to US 190	Northern terminus of LA 77 Spur (signed as LA 77)
Pointe Coupee	Morganza	124.792	200.833	LA 3050	Northern terminus of LA 3050
Pointe Coupee	Morganza	124.813	200.867	LA 1 north (Gayden Road) – Simmesport	Western end of LA 1 concurrency
Pointe Coupee	Labarre	128.725	207.163	LA 420 (Pointe Coupee Road)	Western terminus of LA 420
Pointe Coupee	New Roads	132.625	213.439	LA 1 south (Hospital Road) – Baton Rouge, Opelousas LA 1 Bus. begins	Eastern end of LA 1 concurrency; northern terminus of LA 1 Bus.; western end of LA 1 Bus. concurrency
Pointe Coupee		133.532	214.899	LA 1 Bus. south / LA 10 Bus. east (Parent Street) – New Roads	Eastern end of LA 1 Bus. concurrency; western terminus of LA 10 Bus.
Pointe Coupee		135.808	218.562	LA 10 Bus. west / LA 420 north (Ferry Road) – New Roads	Eastern terminus of LA 10 Bus. and LA 420
Pointe Coupee		139.780	224.954	To LA 981	Access via frontage road
Mississippi River		140.231– 142.522	225.680– 229.367	John James Audubon Bridge	
West Feliciana	Starhill	145.083– 145.097	233.488– 233.511	US 61 south – Baton Rouge	Western end of US 61 concurrency
West Feliciana	Starhill	145.720	234.514	LA 966 east	Western terminus of LA 966
West Feliciana		147.694	237.690	LA 965 east	Western end of LA 965 concurrency; to Audubon State Historic Site
West Feliciana		147.843	237.930	LA 965 west (Ball's Lane)	Eastern end of LA 965 concurrency
West Feliciana	St. Francisville	148.966	239.738	Commerce Street – Downtown St. Francisville	
West Feliciana	St. Francisville	149.669– 149.702	240.869– 240.922	US 61 north – Woodville	Eastern end of US 61 concurrency
West Feliciana		159.256	256.298	LA 965	Northern terminus of LA 965; to Audubon State Historic Site
West Feliciana		160.473	258.256	LA 421	Eastern terminus of LA 421
East Feliciana	Jackson	161.446	259.822	LA 952 (College Street)	Southern terminus of LA 952; to Centenary State Historic Site
East Feliciana	Jackson	163.134	262.539	LA 68 – Baton Rouge	
East Feliciana	McManus	166.495	267.948	LA 953	Northern terminus of LA 953
East Feliciana		167.080	268.889	LA 19 – Centreville, Baton Rouge	
East Feliciana		170.060	273.685	LA 963	Eastern terminus of LA 963
East Feliciana		171.961	276.744	LA 955	Northern terminus of LA 955
East Feliciana	Clinton	173.865	279.809	LA 67 north (Liberty Street)	Western end of LA 67 concurrency
East Feliciana	Clinton	174.003	280.031	LA 67 south (Plank Road) – Baton Rouge	Eastern end of LA 67 concurrency
East Feliciana		176.686	284.349	LA 961	Southern terminus of LA 961
East Feliciana		184.252– 184.371	296.525– 296.716	Bridge over Amite River	
St. Helena	Coleman Town	185.983	299.311	LA 38 east – Chipola, Kentwood	Western terminus of LA 38
St. Helena	Darlington	188.440	303.265	LA 448 south – Grangeville, Denham Springs	Northern terminus of LA 448
St. Helena		189.735	305.349	LA 1043 north	Southern terminus of LA 1043
St. Helena	Greensburg	195.802	315.113	LA 37 south – Baton Rouge	Northern terminus of LA 37
St. Helena	Greensburg	196.007	315.443	LA 43 north (Kendrick Street)	Western end of LA 43 concurrency
St. Helena	Greensburg	196.072	315.547	LA 43 south (Sitman Street)	Eastern end of LA 43 concurrency
St. Helena		197.269	317.474	LA 10 Spur	Eastern terminus of LA 10 Spur
St. Helena		198.590	319.600	LA 441 north	Western end of LA 441 concurrency
St. Helena		199.222	320.617	LA 441 south	Eastern end of LA 441 concurrency
Tangipahoa		203.830– 204.329	328.033– 328.836	I-55 – Hammond, Jackson	Exit 53 on I-55
Tangipahoa	Fluker	205.380	330.527	US 51 north – Tangipahoa	Western end of US 51 concurrency
Tangipahoa	Arcola	208.491	335.534	LA 1048 west to I-55	Eastern terminus of LA 1048
Tangipahoa	Arcola	208.677	335.833	US 51 south – Roseland, Amite City	Eastern end of US 51 concurrency
Tangipahoa		209.354– 209.445	336.923– 337.069	Bridge over Tangipahoa River	
Tangipahoa		211.985	341.157	LA 1058 north	Southern terminus of LA 1058
Tangipahoa		213.094	342.942	LA 1054 south	Western end of LA 1054 concurrency
Tangipahoa		213.369	343.384	LA 1054 north	Eastern end of LA 1054 concurrency
Tangipahoa	Wilmer	218.138– 218.165	351.059– 351.103	LA 1061	
Washington	Stoney Point	223.215	359.230	LA 450 – Sunny Hill, Folsom	
Washington	Richardson	228.743	368.126	LA 440 west	Eastern terminus of LA 440
Washington		231.576	372.685	LA 16 west / LA 25 south – Folsom, Amite City	Western end of LA 16 / LA 25 concurrency
Washington	Franklinton	232.210– 232.460	373.706– 374.108	Chess Richardson Bridge over Bogue Chitto River	
Washington	Franklinton	232.738	374.556	LA 16 east / LA 25 north (Main Street)	Eastern end of LA 16 / LA 25 concurrency
Washington	Franklinton	232.944	374.887	LA 436 east (Mott Street)	Western terminus of LA 436
Washington		241.038	387.913	LA 439 south	Northern terminus of LA 439
Washington	Sheridan	242.117	389.650	LA 62 north – Pine	Southern terminus of LA 62
Washington	Bogalusa	252.560	406.456	LA 60 west (Shenandoah Street)	Eastern terminus of LA 60
Washington	Bogalusa	253.266	407.592	LA 3124 south (Richmond Street)	Northern terminus of LA 3124
Washington	Bogalusa	253.514	407.991	LA 21 (North Columbia Street) – Covington, Columbia	
Washington		254.887– 255.505	410.201– 411.195	Bridge over Pearl River	
Washington		255.505	411.195	MS 26 – Poplarville	Eastern terminus; continuation in Mississippi
1.000 mi = 1.609 km; 1.000 km = 0.621 mi: Concurrency terminus

== Special routes ==
=== New Roads business route ===
Louisiana Highway 10 Business
- Location: New Roads
- Length: 3.441 mi (5.538 km)
- Existed: 2011–present

Louisiana Highway 10 Business (LA 10 Bus.) runs 3.44 miles (5.54 km) in a southwest to northeast direction from LA 1 Bus. and LA 10 to a second junction with LA 10 north of New Roads. The highway follows the original route of LA 10 through New Roads before the construction of the John James Audubon Bridge across the Mississippi River caused the realignment of several highway routes in the area.

From the southwest, LA 10 Bus. heads east on Parent Street co-signed with LA 1 Bus. and immediately enters the city of New Roads. At New Roads Street, opposite the St. Augustine Catholic Church and Cemetery, LA 1 Bus. turns south toward the downtown area located along the False River. LA 10 Bus. turns north onto New Roads Street briefly before curving to the northeast and away from town. After 1.7 miles (2.7 km), LA 10 Bus. ends at an intersection with its parent route opposite the eastern terminus of LA 420.

LA 10 Bus. is an undivided two-lane highway for its entire length. The portion of the route shared with LA 1 Bus. is classified by the La DOTD as an urban minor arterial with an average daily traffic volume of between 5,800 and 6,300 vehicles in 2013. The remainder of the route is a mixture of urban collector and rural major collector averaging 4,800 vehicles daily through town, reduced to 1,220 as it approaches LA 10. The posted speed limit is generally 30 mph (50 km/h) through town and 55 mph (90 km/h) otherwise.

Prior to 1955, the route was part of State Routes 30 and 35. It became part of the original route of LA 10 with the 1955 Louisiana Highway renumbering and remained so until the Audubon Bridge and adjacent New Roads bypass were opened in 2011. At this time, the old route through New Roads was retained in the state highway system as LA 10 Bus.

The entire highway is in Pointe Coupee Parish.

Location	mi	km	Destinations	Notes
	0.000	0.000	LA 1 Bus. north / LA 10 – Morganza, St. Francisville	Western terminus; western end of LA 1 Bus. concurrency
New Roads	1.591	2.560	LA 1 Bus. south (New Roads Street)	Eastern end of LA 1 Bus. concurrency
	3.441	5.538	LA 10 – Morganza, St. Francisville LA 420 north (Ferry Road)	Eastern terminus of LA 10 Bus. and LA 420
1.000 mi = 1.609 km; 1.000 km = 0.621 mi: Concurrency terminus

=== Greensburg spur route ===
Louisiana Highway 10 Spur
- Location: Greensburg
- Length: 0.830 mi (1,336 m)
- Existed: 1994–present

Louisiana Highway 10 Spur (LA 10 Spur) runs 0.83 miles (1.34 km) in an east–west direction from a local road in Greensburg to a junction with LA 10 just east of the corporate limits. It is a remnant of the original route of LA 10 through Greensburg.

LA 10 Spur is an undivided two-lane highway for its entire length. It is classified as a rural local road by the La DOTD with an average daily traffic volume of 1,270 vehicles in 2013. The posted speed limit is 35 mph (55 km/h), increasing to 55 mph (90 km/h) outside the town limits.

Prior to 1955, the route was part of State Route 35. It became part of the original route of LA 10 with the 1955 Louisiana Highway renumbering and remained so until the present parallel alignment was opened in 1994. At this time, LA 10 ceased to make a jog south onto Sitman Street and east onto this route, which was retained in the state highway system as LA 10 Spur. The western portion, extending from LA 43 (Sitman Street) to the current point of state maintenance, was returned to local control in 2015 as part of the LaDOTD's Road Transfer Program with the remainder proposed for deletion in the future.

The entire highway is in St. Helena Parish.

Location	mi	km	Destinations	Notes
Greensburg	0.000	0.000	Begin state maintenance	Western terminus
	0.830	1.336	LA 10 (Zachary Taylor Parkway)	Eastern terminus
1.000 mi = 1.609 km; 1.000 km = 0.621 mi

== See also ==
- List of crossings of the Lower Mississippi River
