= U.S. Route 51 in Louisiana =

Section of U.S. Highway in Louisiana, United States

U.S. Highway 51
- Route of US 51 highlighted in red

Route information
- Maintained by Louisiana DOTD
- Length: 69.116 mi (111.231 km)
- Existed: 1926–present
- Tourist routes: Louisiana Scenic Byway: Southern Swamps Byway

Major junctions
- South end: US 61 in LaPlace
- I-10 in LaPlace; I-55 north of LaPlace; LA 22 in Ponchatoula; I-55 in Hammond; US 190 in Hammond; LA 16 in Amite City; LA 10 north of Roseland
- North end: US 51 at Mississippi state line north of Kentwood

Location
- Country: United States
- State: Louisiana
- Parishes: St. John the Baptist, Tangipahoa

Highway system
- United States Numbered Highway System; List; Special; Divided; Louisiana State Highway System; Interstate; US; State; Scenic
← LA 50	→ LA 52
← SR 32	SR 33	→ SR 34

U.S. Highway 51 (US 51) is a part of the United States Numbered Highway System that spans 1,277 miles (2,055 km) from LaPlace, Louisiana to a point north of Hurley, Wisconsin. Within the state of Louisiana, the highway travels 69.12 miles (111.24 km) from the national southern terminus at US 61 in LaPlace to the Mississippi state line north of Kentwood.

After heading north through LaPlace to a junction with Interstate 10 (I-10) west of New Orleans, the highway joins I-55 on a 22-mile-long (35 km) twin-span viaduct across the Manchac Swamp. The bridge, which passes between Lakes Pontchartrain and Maurepas, is the second-longest bridge over water in the United States and serves as a vital hurricane evacuation route for the New Orleans metropolitan area.

With Ponchatoula served by the highway's only designated business route, US 51 splits from the interstate in the neighboring city of Hammond. For the remainder of its journey in southeastern Louisiana, the route closely parallels I-55, which carries the bulk of through traffic toward Jackson, Mississippi and points north. US 51 serves local traffic through a string of communities in Tangipahoa Parish situated along the Canadian National Railway line, including the towns of Independence, Amite City, and Kentwood.

Prior to 1951, US 51 began in downtown New Orleans and followed the route of US 61 to its current southern terminus in LaPlace. For a time in the late 1920s to mid-1930s, however, it was intended to follow a scenic route along the shore of Lake Pontchartrain known as the New Orleans–Hammond Lakeshore Highway. Construction difficulties and budget limitations led to the abandonment of the project before the portion through the swamps of St. Charles Parish could be completed.

== Route description ==
=== LaPlace to Hammond ===
From the south, US 51 begins at an intersection with US 61 (West Airline Highway) in Laplace, an unincorporated community located on the east bank of the Mississippi River in St. John the Baptist Parish. US 61 parallels the route of I-10 between New Orleans and Baton Rouge. US 51 heads northeast as an undivided four-lane highway with a center turning lane through a growing residential and commercial corridor. After 3 miles (4.8 km), the route reaches the edge of town and passes through a diamond interchange with I-10 at exit 209. This interchange is also used to feed traffic between I-10 to the west and I-55 to the north as there is no direct connection. With a median replacing the center lane, US 51 proceeds a short distance to an intersection with Frenier Road, where signage directs through traffic to turn west and follow a ramp onto the elevated I-55 at exit 1. For the next 22 miles (35 km), US 51 travels concurrently with the elevated four-lane interstate through the thickly wooded swamp lying between Lake Pontchartrain and Lake Maurepas. This twin-span concrete trestle is known as the Manchac Swamp Bridge and is the second-longest bridge over water in the United States. 7 miles (11 km) along the way, a tight diamond interchange at Ruddock connects with the grade-level pre-interstate alignment, which serves as a frontage road and closely parallels the entire stretch.

After 13.5 miles (21.7 km), the highway elevates higher to cross Pass Manchac, a waterway that connects the two lakes and forms the boundary between St. John the Baptist Parish and Tangipahoa Parish. The area flanking the pass, generally called Manchac, contains a cluster of boat houses and fishing camps situated along the frontage road. This small community is also known as Galva on the south side and Akers on the north side. The highway proceeds through the swamps of southern Tangipahoa Parish for another 8 miles (13 km) before returning to grade. At this point, an exit primarily serving southbound traffic connects to the north end of the frontage road. Soon afterward, I-55/US 51 curves to the northwest at exit 23 while US 51 Bus. begins and splits off straight ahead into the small city of Ponchatoula. The interstate proceeds around the west side of town, an area of scattered suburban development within the thick pine forest. A cloverleaf interchange at exit 26 connects to LA 22, the primary east–west highway through Ponchatoula. US 51 departs from I-55 at the following exit and enters the neighboring city of Hammond, the largest city along its route.

=== Hammond to Mississippi state line ===
Heading north on Morrison Boulevard, US 51 returns to its original capacity, an undivided four-lane highway with center turning lane. Almost immediately, the highway crosses over without intersecting I-12, a northern bypass of the New Orleans metropolitan area, just east of its interchange with I-55. For the remainder of its journey in Louisiana, US 51 parallels the route of I-55 at a distance generally between 1 and 2 miles (1.6 and 3.2 km) to the east. Passing to the west of the traditional downtown area, US 51 intersects US 190 (West Thomas Street), its main east–west commercial thoroughfare. This intersection also marks the northern terminus of US 51 Bus. Upon exiting Hammond, an intersection with LA 3234 (West University Avenue) connects the route with nearby Southeastern Louisiana University. Shortly afterward, US 51 narrows to an undivided two-lane highway and will remain in that capacity for the rest of its journey.

After passing through the community of Natalbany, US 51 enters the village of Tickfaw and begins to follow alongside the Canadian National Railway (CN) line. Both the highway and the rail line pass through a string of communities on the way to the Mississippi state line and intersect a series of rural east–west routes that often lead to nearby interchanges with I-55, the main route of through traffic in the area. In Tickfaw, this function is served by LA 442, which also has a brief concurrency with US 51 as the former makes a zigzag in the center of town. 4 miles (6.4 km) north of Tickfaw, US 51 passes through the town of Independence, where LA 40 connects to I-55 as well as points such as Loranger and Husser. Continuing due north for 6 miles (9.7 km), US 51 enters Amite City, the parish seat. Initially traveling along 1st Street, one block distant from the railroad line, US 51 zigzags east onto Chestnut Street then north onto Central Avenue. One block later, flanked by the rail line and a row of antique brick storefronts, an intersection with LA 16 (Oak Street) in the center of town leads to I-55 and the towns of Franklinton and Montpelier.

Between two points known as Arcola and Fluker, located just north of the neighboring town of Roseland, US 51 has a 3-mile-long (4.8 km) concurrency with LA 10, another connection to Franklinton as well as Greensburg. US 51 proceeds through rural northern Tangipahoa Parish, passing through a village of the same name before entering Kentwood, the final town along its route. US 51 passes through Kentwood on 3rd Street and intersects LA 38, the main east–west thoroughfare, at Avenue G. The highway curves to the northeast on the way out of town and continues for another 4 miles (6.4 km) to the state line. During this stretch is the final junction with a state route, LA 1054, in an area known as Greenlaw. Immediately across the state line, US 51 continues into the Pike County, Mississippi town of Osyka en route to McComb.

=== Route classification and data ===
The portions of US 51 not concurrent with I-55 are generally classified as an urban or rural major collector by the Louisiana Department of Transportation and Development (La DOTD). However, the section running through Hammond serves as an urban principal arterial. Daily traffic volume in 2013 peaked at 24,500 vehicles in Hammond, decreasing steadily to around 3,000 heading north toward Kentwood. After increasing to 14,700 through Kentwood, the figures dwindled to a low of 2,300 vehicles per day near the Mississippi state line. The posted speed limit is generally 55 mph (90 km/h) in rural areas, reduced to as low as 25 mph (40 km/h) through town. However, the multilane sections through LaPlace and Hammond carry a speed limit of 45 mph (70 km/h).

The portion of US 51 utilizing the route of I-55 is classified as an urban interstate north of exit 23 and as a rural interstate otherwise. Daily traffic volume in 2013 averaged about 18,200 vehicles near I-10 and steadily increased to a peak of 31,200 vehicles between the Ponchatoula and Hammond exits. The posted speed limit is 70 mph (115 km/h).

The entire I-55/US 51 frontage road (Old US 51) south of Ponchatoula is part of the Southern Swamps Byway in the state-designated system of tourist routes known as the Louisiana Scenic Byways. This byway also follows the route of LA 22 southwest from Ponchatoula through the Maurepas swamp to the town of Sorrento.

== History ==
US 51 was designated in November 1926 as one of the original routes of the numbered U.S. Highway system. It was the main traffic route connecting New Orleans to Jackson, Mississippi and Memphis, Tennessee in the days before the existence of the Interstate Highway System. The southern terminus of US 51 was originally located in downtown New Orleans at a junction with US 61 and US 90. Much of the distance between New Orleans and Hammond was intended to follow the New Orleans–Hammond Lakeshore Highway, an ambitious project by the Louisiana Highway Commission to construct a road through the LaBranche and Manchac swamps around the rim of Lake Pontchartrain. This proposed scenic highway was never fully realized, and US 51 effectively followed the route of US 61 through the New Orleans area until being truncated to its present terminus in LaPlace in 1951, eliminating the concurrency.

=== New Orleans–Hammond Highway ===
State Route 33
- Location: New Orleans; Frenier–Mississippi state line
- Length: 71.3 mi (114.7 km)
- Existed: 1921–1955

The New Orleans–Hammond Lakeshore Highway had been planned for several years when, in 1921, it was designated as part of State Route 33, one of the original 98 routes in the pre-1955 state highway system.

Route No. 33. Beginning at South Carrollton Avenue and New Basin Canal New Orleans, both sides of the New Basin Canal as far as the Cemeteries, thence on the West side of the New Basin Canal to West End thence along the shore of Lake Pontchartrain, through La Branche, Ruddock, Stradder[sic], Ponchatoula, Hammond, Amite, Kentwood, to a point on the Mississippi State line.

— 1921 legislative route description

In New Orleans, Route 33 was designated to follow an existing road alongside a shipping canal from South Carrollton Avenue to an area on Lake Pontchartrain known as West End. (Much of this road still survives as Pontchartrain Boulevard and partly travels alongside the Pontchartrain Expressway, a section of I-10 that follows the old canal right-of-way.) However, the entire route along the lakeshore and on to Ponchatoula existed only on paper. North of Ponchatoula, the remainder of the route would have the benefit of following existing roads through the higher terrain there. The construction of the lakeshore highway was intended to provide a direct land connection between New Orleans and Hammond while taking advantage of the scenic beauty of Lake Pontchartrain and the surrounding swampland. In addition, the man-made embankment required to carry the road would serve as a levee to prevent lake water from inundating the extensive residential development envisioned to line the highway.

==== Construction ====
Construction began in May 1923 to extend the highway south from Ponchatoula through the Manchac swamp to Frenier near the present intersection of I-10 and I-55. At the time, the method of road construction through such terrain involved the long and arduous task of dredging a canal along the intended right-of-way and piling up the spoils on the side of the canal to form an embankment. After a repeated process of machine-rolling and allowing for sufficient settling of the roadbed, the embankment would be surfaced with shells dredged from the lake. A 3,000-foot (910 m) timber bridge with a steel draw span was constructed across Pass Manchac, and smaller bridges totaling over 2,600 feet (790 m) spanned the numerous other waterways along the route. This link of the highway was officially opened on April 1, 1927 with a formal dedication following three weeks later. While still under construction, Route 33 was chosen as the official route of US 51 after the U.S. Highway system was implemented in November 1926.

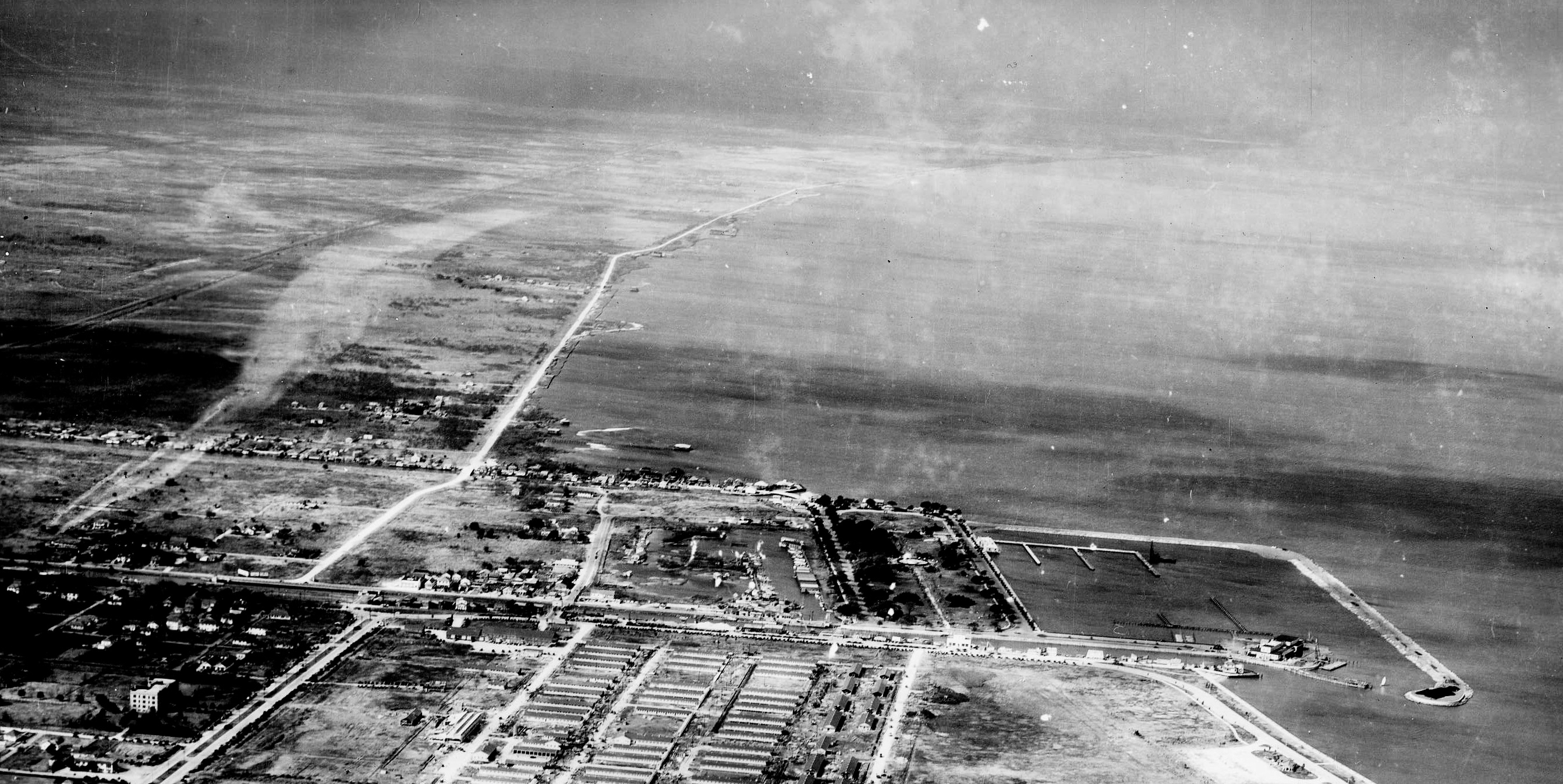
1941 aerial photo showing Old Hammond Highway running along the Lake Pontchartrain shore west from West End, New Orleans

The connection to New Orleans was made by following State Route 53—roughly the modern route of US 51 from Frenier to LaPlace—and US 61 (State Route 1, the Jefferson Highway) into New Orleans. This was intended to be a temporary measure until the remainder of the route along Lake Pontchartrain was completed. Nevertheless, the highway distance between New Orleans and Hammond was reduced from 90.5 to 68 miles (145.6 to 109.4 km) by eliminating a circuitous route around the eastern side of Lake Pontchartrain through Slidell, Mandeville, and Covington that included two ferry crossings.

==== Cancellation ====
While Jefferson Parish completed its section of the route between West End and Kenner in the early 1930s, several factors caused the construction of the remaining link between Kenner and Frenier to be abandoned soon afterward. The route through the LaBranche swamp in St. Charles Parish proved to be the most difficult road construction in the state up to that time, and the heavy expenditure invested became a continual source of controversy. The highway's practical need was questioned as construction progressed on the more important Airline Highway, a streamlined route between New Orleans and Baton Rouge that would parallel the lakeshore route through the area. The death knell, however, was the construction of the Bonnet Carré Spillway in 1933 that bisected the route. A two-mile section of the embankment, not yet surfaced for travel, was severed to provide a path for floodwaters as part of a larger system designed to prevent a re-occurrence of the Great Mississippi Flood of 1927. With three highways—the existing Jefferson Highway, the new Airline Highway, and the proposed Lakeshore Highway—now potentially requiring bridges to cross the spillway, the Lakeshore Highway could no longer be provided for. As a result, the section of the route through Jefferson Parish was scarcely used and only sporadically maintained for automobile traffic.

By 1945, the embankment had eroded considerably and was no longer adequate in terms of flood protection for the growing suburban development in the parish. Over the next few years, a new levee system was constructed by improved methods on the land side of the original embankment, which was then abandoned as a public road. Only a small segment through the populated area of Bucktown was encompassed by the new levee and remains in use today. A bridge crossing the 17th Street Canal on the Jefferson–Orleans parish line connects it with the portion within the city of New Orleans. Popularly known as Old Hammond Highway, the road is signed as Metairie–Hammond Highway on the Jefferson Parish side and as NO–Hammond Highway on the New Orleans side.

With the abandonment of the Lakeshore Highway, US 51 remained co-signed with US 61 into New Orleans. This routing was officially recognized by the American Association of State Highway Officials (AASHO) on July 22, 1939 and took effect on January 1, 1940. A decade later, however, the Louisiana Department of Highways eliminated several unnecessary U.S. Highway concurrencies and truncated the route of US 51 to the junction with US 61 in LaPlace. The portion of the old Lakeshore Highway in New Orleans and the Bucktown neighborhood in Jefferson Parish remained in the state highway system as a disconnected part of Route 33 until the 1955 Louisiana Highway renumbering. The remainder of US 51 carried no state route designation after the renumbering, which eliminated unnecessary concurrencies between U.S. and state routes.

=== Improvements and alignment changes ===
Paving projects during the late 1920s and early 1930s led to the early realignment of two portions of US 51 in Tangipahoa Parish. The original route between Independence and Amite City followed what is now known as Old US 51 and remained for a time in the pre-1955 state highway system as State Route 1094. The original route between Tangipahoa and Kentwood is still state-maintained as portions of LA 1050, LA 1051, and LA 1049. The entire route of US 51 in Louisiana was paved by 1938.

A new fixed-span bridge over Pass Manchac was completed in August 1957 on the west side of the original bridge, which was utilized as a fishing pier until being destroyed by fire in 1969. The four-lane bypass of Ponchatoula and Hammond was completed around the end of 1960. It was the first section of I-55 to open in Louisiana as well as one of the first completed projects of the Interstate Highway System in the state. US 51 was immediately moved onto the bypass, and the original alignment traversing the center of both cities was designated as US 51 Bus.

The entire portion of US 51 between Frenier and the Ponchatoula bypass was reconstructed between the late 1950s and mid-1960s. This road now serves as the I-55/US 51 frontage road. The original roadbed, still visible on the east side of the frontage road, had continually suffered from subsidence and was promptly abandoned. The new road was later intended to carry southbound traffic on I-55 and was to be paired with an elevated span carrying the northbound lanes. In 1972, plans changed to the current configuration of a double elevated span with the ground-level road serving as a frontage road. Plans for a frontage road on the opposite side of the elevated highway were proposed but eventually abandoned.

On September 13, 1976, two barges veered from the main channel below the Pass Manchac Bridge, striking a bent leading to the collapse of three spans. One person was killed and at least two others injured in the accident. Using federal disaster funds, the bridge was rebuilt over the course of three months and reopened to traffic on December 17, 1976.

The new twin-span elevated highway was opened on May 25, 1979, and official Louisiana highway maps indicate that US 51 remained on the ground-level route for two or three years before being shifted onto the interstate alignment. With a length of 22.8 miles (36.7 km), the elevated section of I-55/US 51 (known as the Manchac Swamp Bridge) became one of the longest bridges over water in the world. Free from flooding and subsidence, it provides a vital hurricane evacuation route for the New Orleans metropolitan area.

The final realignment of US 51 to date shifted the route through LaPlace from Main Street, a narrow two-lane thoroughfare, onto a parallel five-lane alignment completed in 1985.

== Future ==
La DOTD is currently engaged in a program that aims to transfer about 5,000 miles (8,000 km) of state-owned roadways to local governments over the next several years. Under this plan of "right-sizing" the state highway system, the portion of US 51 between I-55 and US 190 in Hammond is proposed for deletion as it does not meet a significant interurban travel function. The portions of US 51 Bus. not concurrent with US 190 or LA 22 are also to be transferred to local control.

== Major intersections ==
Note: Exit numbers reflect I-55 mileage only.

Parish	Location	mi	km	Exit	Destinations	Notes
St. John the Baptist	LaPlace	0.000	0.000		US 61 (West Airline Highway) – New Orleans, Baton Rouge	Southern terminus
St. John the Baptist	LaPlace	2.872– 3.111	4.622– 5.007		I-10 – New Orleans, Baton Rouge	Exit 209 on I-10
St. John the Baptist		3.256– 4.074	5.240– 6.556	1	I-55 south to I-10 west – New Orleans	South end of I-55 concurrency; northbound entrance and southbound exit
St. John the Baptist		3.868	6.225	South end of Manchac Swamp Bridge		
St. John the Baptist	Ruddock	10.574– 11.237	17.017– 18.084	7	Ruddock	
St. John the Baptist–Tangipahoa parish line	Ruddock–Manchac line	17.348– 18.031	27.919– 29.018	Bridge over Pass Manchac		
Tangipahoa	Manchac	18.236– 18.897	29.348– 30.412	15	Manchac	
Tangipahoa		25.928	41.727	North end of Manchac Swamp Bridge		
Tangipahoa		26.072– 26.175	41.959– 42.125	22	Frontage Road	Northbound entrance and southbound exit; to Old US 51 (local name)
Tangipahoa		26.403– 27.040	42.492– 43.517	23	US 51 Bus. north – Ponchatoula	Southern terminus of US 51 Bus.
Tangipahoa	Ponchatoula	28.816– 29.438	46.375– 47.376	26	LA 22 – Ponchatoula, Springfield	
Tangipahoa	Hammond	31.315– 31.887	50.397– 51.317	28	I-55 north – Jackson	North end of I-55 concurrency
Tangipahoa	Hammond	33.562	54.013		LA 1040 west (Chauvin Road)	Eastern terminus of LA 1040
Tangipahoa	Hammond	33.814	54.418		US 51 Bus. south / US 190 (West Thomas Street) to I-55	Northern terminus of US 51 Bus.
Tangipahoa	Hammond	34.067	54.826		To I-55 via West Church Street	
Tangipahoa	Hammond	35.074	56.446		LA 3234 (West University Avenue) to I-55	To Southeastern Louisiana University
Tangipahoa	Natalbany	36.904	59.391		LA 1064 (Natalbany Road)	
Tangipahoa	Tickfaw	39.022	62.800		LA 442 east	South end of LA 442 concurrency
Tangipahoa	Tickfaw	39.082	62.896		LA 442 west to I-55	North end of LA 442 concurrency
Tangipahoa	Independence	43.097	69.358		LA 1063 west (West 5th Street) LA 1065 south (Tiger Avenue)	Eastern terminus of LA 1063; northern terminus of LA 1065
Tangipahoa	Independence	43.365	69.789		LA 40 (3rd Street) to I-55 – Loranger, Husser	
Tangipahoa	Amite City	49.668	79.933		LA 16 (West Oak Street) to I-55 – Montpelier, Franklinton	
Tangipahoa	Arcola	53.193	85.606		LA 10 east – Franklinton	South end of LA 10 concurrency
Tangipahoa	Arcola	53.379	85.905		LA 1048 west to I-55	Eastern terminus of LA 1048
Tangipahoa	Fluker	56.490	90.912		LA 10 west to I-55 – Greensburg	North end of LA 10 concurrency
Tangipahoa	Tangipahoa	59.936	96.458		LA 440 (Center Street) to I-55 – Chesbrough, Spring Creek	
Tangipahoa	Kentwood	64.280	103.449		LA 38 (Avenue G) to I-55 – Mt. Hermon, Clinton	
Tangipahoa	Kentwood	65.200	104.929		LA 1053 north	Southern terminus of LA 1053
Tangipahoa	Greenlaw	67.921	109.308		LA 1054 east	Northern terminus of LA 1054
Tangipahoa		69.116	111.231		US 51 north – McComb	Continuation in Mississippi
1.000 mi = 1.609 km; 1.000 km = 0.621 mi: Concurrency terminus

== Business route ==
U.S. Highway 51 Business
- Location: Ponchatoula–Hammond
- Length: 8.814 mi (14.185 km)
- Existed: 1960–present

U.S. Highway 51 Business (US 51 Bus.) runs 8.81 miles (14.18 km) in a general north–south direction through Ponchatoula and Hammond, two neighboring cities in Tangipahoa Parish. It follows the original route of US 51 through the area before the completion of the I-55 bypass just to the west in 1960.

From the south, US 51 Bus. begins at an interchange with the concurrent I-55/US 51 at exit 23. It branches to the north as an undivided two-lane highway alongside the Canadian National Railway (CN) line through the thickly wooded swamp into Ponchatoula, traveling on Southwest Railroad Avenue. After two miles (3.2 km), the highway reaches the center of town and intersects LA 22 (West Pine Street), an undivided four-lane thoroughfare. US 51 Bus. turns west to follow LA 22, flanked by rows of historic brick storefronts. Just short of a cloverleaf interchange with I-55, US 51 Bus. turns back to the north opposite the Ponchatoula Cemetery. Proceeding as a two-lane highway with a center turning lane, US 51 Bus. crosses from Ponchatoula into the city of Hammond just past the North Oaks Medical Center.

Shortly afterward, the highway passes through a diamond interchange with I-12, a northern bypass of the New Orleans metropolitan area connecting with Baton Rouge and Slidell. The route initially widens to four lanes with its center lane intact, but its travel lanes divide onto the one-way pair of South Railroad Avenue and South Oak Street as it approaches the center of town. Here, US 51 Bus. intersects US 190, the city's main east–west thoroughfare, which follows the one-way pair of Morris and Thomas Streets. The route turns west concurrent with US 190 and heads through the downtown area. After a dozen blocks, the east and westbound lanes converge as West Thomas Street widens to four lanes. Soon afterward, US 51 Bus. terminates at an intersection with its parent route at Morrison Boulevard.

US 51 Bus. is classified by the Louisiana Department of Transportation and Development (La DOTD) as an urban minor arterial in Ponchatoula and as an urban principal arterial in Hammond. The average daily traffic volume in 2013 was reported as reaching peaks of 28,000 and 31,500 vehicles in Ponchatoula and Hammond, respectively. The lowest figure reported was 4,800 vehicles daily through the sparsely populated swamp at its southern end. The posted speed limit ranges from 25 mph (40 km/h) through the center of both cities to 55 mph (90 km/h) in more rural areas.

The route was part of mainline US 51 from its creation in 1926 until its realignment onto I-55 in 1960. It was also part of State Route 33 until the 1955 Louisiana Highway renumbering when unnecessary overlapping of U.S. and state routes was discontinued.

Major intersections
The entire highway is in Tangipahoa Parish.

Location	mi	km	Destinations	Notes
	0.000– 0.406	0.000– 0.653	I-55 / US 51 – Hammond, New Orleans	Southern terminus; exit 23 on I-55
Ponchatoula	1.998	3.215	LA 22 east (East Pine Street) – Madisonville	South end of LA 22 concurrency
Ponchatoula	2.899	4.665	LA 22 west (West Pine Street) to I-55 – Springfield	North end of LA 22 concurrency
Hammond	5.658– 5.855	9.106– 9.423	I-12 – Baton Rouge, Slidell	Exit 40 on I-12
Hammond	7.423– 7.492	11.946– 12.057	US 190 east (East Morris Street, East Thomas Street) – Covington	South end of US 190 concurrency; one-way pair
Hammond	8.814	14.185	US 51 (Morrison Boulevard) to I-55 – Ponchatoula, Amite City US 190 west (West Thomas Street) to I-55 – Baton Rouge	Northern terminus; north end of US 190 concurrency
1.000 mi = 1.609 km; 1.000 km = 0.621 mi: Concurrency terminus

== See also ==
U.S. Route 51
Previous state: Terminus	Louisiana	Next state: Mississippi
