= Francisville =

Francisville may refer to:

- Francisville, Kentucky
- Francisville, Georgia
- Francisville, Philadelphia

== See also ==
- Francesville, Indiana
- St. Francisville (disambiguation)
