= Interstate 55 in Louisiana =

Highway in Louisiana

Interstate 55
- I-55 highlighted in red

Route information
- Maintained by Louisiana DOTD
- Length: 66.086 mi (Note: For the federal government's purposes, the Federal Highway Administration lists Louisiana's portion of I-55 as 65.81 miles (105.91 km) in length.) (106.355 km)
- Existed: 1960–present
- Tourist routes: Louisiana Scenic Byway: Southern Swamps Byway
- NHS: Entire route

Major junctions
- South end: I-10 in LaPlace
- US 51 in Frenier; US 51 in Hammond; I-12 in Hammond; US 190 in Hammond
- North end: I-55 at Mississippi state line north of Kentwood

Location
- Country: United States
- State: Louisiana
- Parishes: St. John the Baptist, Tangipahoa

Highway system
- Interstate Highway System; Main; Auxiliary; Suffixed; Business; Future; Louisiana State Highway System; Interstate; US; State; Scenic
← LA 54	→ LA 55

Interstate 55 (I-55) is a part of the Interstate Highway System that spans 964.25 miles (1,551.81 km) from LaPlace, Louisiana, to Chicago, Illinois. Within the state of Louisiana, the highway travels 66 miles (106 km) from the national southern terminus at I-10 in LaPlace to the Mississippi state line north of Kentwood.

The route is located in the southeastern portion of Louisiana and parallels the older U.S. Highway 51 (US 51) corridor. While passing through the city of Hammond, I-55 intersects two of the state's major east–west routes, I-12 and US 190. It also serves the smaller city of Ponchatoula, as well as the towns of Amite City and Kentwood.

I-55 is a major highway through the New Orleans metropolitan area, the city being located 20 miles (32 km) east of the junction between I-10 and I-55. It also serves as an important hurricane evacuation route for the region. I-55 was opened in several stages beginning in 1960 with a bypass of Ponchatoula and Hammond. The southern 23 miles (37 km) of I-55, consisting of a twin-span viaduct through the Manchac swamp, was completed in 1979 and is one of the longest bridges in the world.

== Route description ==
=== Manchac swamp ===
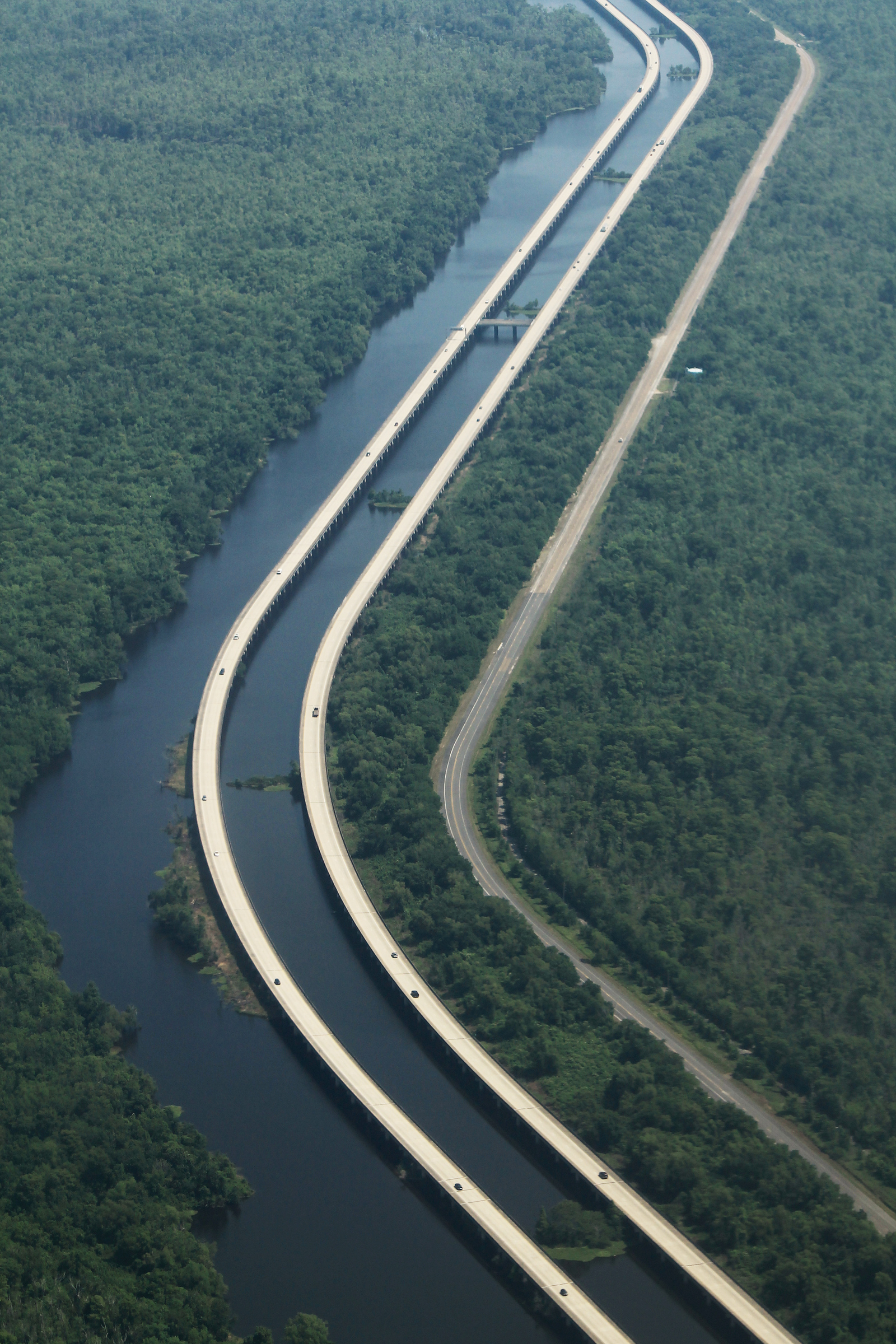
The Manchac Swamp Bridge, which carries I-55 and US 51 over the Manchac Swamp. The grade-level Old US 51 is to the right (east).

From the south, I-55 begins at an interchange with I-10 (exit 210) at the northern edge of LaPlace, an unincorporated community located about 20 miles (32 km) west of New Orleans. A pair of ramps accommodate traffic heading to and from the city with the remaining movements provided by exit 1, a nearby half-diamond interchange with US 51. The first 23 miles (37 km) of I-55 consist of a four-lane concrete viaduct known as the Manchac Swamp Bridge, which cuts through the thickly wooded swamp along the western shore of Lake Pontchartrain. For this entire stretch, I-55 is cosigned with US 51, and the latter's ground-level pre-Interstate alignment (Old US 51) serves as a frontage road along the northbound span. The structure is only 0.7 miles (1.1 km) shorter than the nearby Lake Pontchartrain Causeway, the world's longest continuous bridge over water, and both serve to connect the New Orleans area with its suburban outgrowth north of the lake.

After 14.4 miles (23.2 km), I-55 elevates higher to cross Pass Manchac, a short waterway connecting Lake Pontchartrain with Lake Maurepas that historically served as an international boundary during the 18th and 19th centuries. It is currently the boundary between Louisiana's St. John the Baptist and Tangipahoa parishes. The community situated along the pass is called Manchac and features a number of boat houses and fishing camps flanking the highway. About eight miles (13 km) north of the Manchac exit, I-55 descends to ground level, and an exit primarily serving southbound traffic marks the end of the frontage road.

=== Tangipahoa Parish ===
I-55 immediately curves to the northwest while U.S. Highway 51 Business (US 51 Bus.) splits off straight ahead into the small city of Ponchatoula. The surroundings having transitioned from swampland to pine forest, I-55 skirts the western edge of Ponchatoula, which is served by a cloverleaf interchange with Louisiana Highway 22 (LA 22). US 51 departs from the Interstate at the following exit, and both routes enter the larger adjacent city of Hammond. Shortly afterward, I-55 engages in a full cloverleaf interchange with I-12, a northern bypass of the New Orleans metropolitan area. Two further exits serve Hammond. The first connects to US 190, which parallels I-12 through the region and passes through downtown Hammond. The second connects to LA 3234 (University Avenue) and provides access to Southeastern Louisiana University.

From Hammond northward into Mississippi, I-55 parallels US 51 and generally travels due north on an alignment approximately 1.5 miles (2.4 km) to the west. All further exits are diamond interchanges with rural east–west state highways primarily connecting to the various communities along US 51. These include LA 442 to Tickfaw, LA 40 to Independence, LA 16 to Amite City, LA 1048 to Roseland, LA 10 to Greensburg, and LA 440 to Tangipahoa.

North of Tangipahoa, I-55 passes through the town of Kentwood and has its final exit in Louisiana, which connects to LA 38. Three miles (4.8 km) later, the Louisiana Welcome Center provides a rest area and services for southbound drivers entering the state. Continuing northward, I-55 crosses into Mississippi and proceeds toward the cities of McComb and Jackson.

=== Route classification and data ===
I-55 alternates between a rural and urban Interstate over the course of its route, as determined by the Louisiana Department of Transportation and Development (DOTD). Daily traffic volume in 2013 peaked at 41,800 vehicles in Hammond, staying between approximately 15,000 and 25,000 vehicles otherwise. The posted speed limit is 70 mph (110 km/h).

I-55 is a designated hurricane evacuation route for the New Orleans metropolitan area and southeastern Louisiana in general. A contraflow lane reversal may be instituted from I-12 northward into Mississippi to facilitate the movement of traffic out of the area.

The entire I-55 frontage road (old US 51) south of Ponchatoula is part of the Southern Swamps Byway in the state-designated system of tourist routes known as the Louisiana Scenic Byways. This byway also follows the route of LA 22 southwest from Ponchatoula through the Maurepas swamp to the town of Sorrento.

The portion of I-55 within Tangipahoa Parish has been officially designated as the Congressman Jimmy Morrison Highway since 2003. During his lengthy term in the US House of Representatives, Hammond native James H. Morrison (1908–2000) was responsible for securing 40 percent of Louisiana's Interstate Highway System and was instrumental in getting I-12 routed through the city.

== History ==
=== Planning and initial construction ===
Before the existence of I-55, the main traffic route connecting New Orleans with Jackson, Mississippi, and Memphis, Tennessee, was US 51. Beginning in the late 1930s, the US 51 corridor was included in preliminary plans for what would become the Interstate Highway System. Construction of the system was finally authorized by the Federal Aid Highway Act of 1956, which was signed into law by President Dwight D. Eisenhower on June 29 of that year. The route was officially designated as I-55 on August 14, 1957, and was part of the 602 miles (969 km) of Interstate Highway initially allocated to the state of Louisiana.

As the existing U.S. Highways were adequately handling traffic through rural areas in most cases, the Louisiana Department of Highways decided on a strategy to relieve traffic in urban areas first. A bypass around Ponchatoula and Hammond was listed by the department as 1 of 10 priority projects and was therefore the first section of I-55 to be placed under contract. Completed in the autumn of 1960 at a cost of $3.5 million (equivalent to $28.4 million in 2024), it was one of the first Interstate Highway segments to be opened to traffic in Louisiana. (Note: The Ponchatoula–Hammond bypass on I-55 was constructed under the temporary designation of LA 3023 then signed as I-55 and US 51 upon its completion. The former route of US 51 through both towns was retained as US 51 Bus.) Spanning 5.4 miles (8.7 km), the bypass was designed to connect seamlessly with US 51 at either end, facilitating the flow of traffic around the westside of both downtown areas and eliminating four right-angle turns.

The construction of I-55 running northward from Hammond to the Mississippi state line, a distance of 37.4 miles (60.2 km), was completely underway by the autumn of 1964. It was the first roadway segment in Louisiana to be paved using an economical and time-saving method known as slip forming, or continuously poured concrete. A 26.5-mile (42.6 km) section of I-55 from Roseland, Louisiana, to Magnolia, Mississippi, was opened jointly by the two state highway departments on June 16, 1967. The 18.8 miles (30.3 km) within Louisiana costed $9.8 million (equivalent to $70.1 million in 2024). The resulting 18.7-mile (30.1 km) gap between Hammond and Roseland was opened on May 28, 1969, at a cost of $12.7 million (equivalent to $83.1 million in 2024). This completed the highway between the cities of Hammond, Louisiana, and Jackson, Mississippi.

=== Manchac swamp ===
The southern portion of I-55 between LaPlace and Ponchatoula was constructed last. Building the highway through the Manchac swamp would be the most expensive and difficult project on the state's portion of I-55, as it had been for US 51 four decades earlier. When construction of the Interstate Highway System was authorized in 1956, the swamp section of US 51 was in the process of being entirely rebuilt on an improved embankment adjacent to the original 1927 roadbed, which was narrow and suffering from subsidence. As part of this project, the original bascule bridge across Pass Manchac was being replaced with a higher fixed span. The initial plans for I-55 called for utilizing the new US 51 roadbed and bridge upon completion, but, since both were designed to accommodate two lanes of traffic, an additional two lanes would have to be added later to satisfy Interstate standards. The new Pass Manchac Bridge was opened in August 1957, and the reconstructed two-lane US 51 was completed in stages between 1962 and 1964.

In 1970, the final portion of I-10 connecting the future I-55 with New Orleans was nearing completion. This consisted of a twin-span viaduct across the LaBranche swamp and the Bonnet Carré Spillway. That year, construction began on a $14.5-million (equivalent to $90.1 million in 2024) interchange between the two freeways. In November 1971, the Louisiana Department of Highways announced that the plans for I-55 had changed to consist of twin two-lane viaducts from the Manchac area southward with the existing ground-level US 51 serving as a frontage road alongside the northbound span. While greatly increasing the cost of construction, the elevated spans would not be subject to flooding and would require less maintenance in the long run. The frontage road would also allow the surrounding area to remain accessible to local hunters and fishermen. The highway department and local residents lobbied to have the entire route elevated on the basis that a ground-level roadway north of Manchac would negatively impact the swamp's ecosystem and also be unstable in the long term. Due to the cost element, this proposal was turned down by the Federal Highway Administration (FHWA). In October 1974, however, the agency relented after overwhelming local opposition and an environmental impact survey were presented during a series of public hearings.

Meanwhile, construction of the elevated I-55 had begun in November 1973. A canal was dredged through the swamp along the entire right-of-way, allowing prestressed concrete roadway segments to be floated in by barge from the contractor's plant across Lake Pontchartrain. On September 13, 1976—one month before the new Pass Manchac Bridge was placed under construction—a barge struck the parallel US 51 bridge, knocking a 257-foot (78 m) section of it into the water. Several vehicles plunged off the bridge, but the only fatality was ironically an employee of the construction firm building the I-55 spans who happened to be traveling on the highway at that time. After an initial estimate of six months, the bridge was repaired in half that time, aided by the proximity of the I-55 construction crew. It was reopened to traffic on December 17, 1976, at the same time the 8.6-mile (13.8 km) section of I-55 between I-10 and the Ruddock exit was ready for travel. The remainder of the distance north from Ruddock to Ponchatoula, including the new Pass Manchac bridge, was completed and opened to traffic following its dedication by Governor Edwin Edwards on May 25, 1979. (Note: The official Louisiana highway maps show US 51 remaining on the ground-level route (now the I-55 frontage road) for two or three years before being cosigned with I-55 on the elevated alignment.) With a length of 22.8 miles (36.7 km), the elevated portion of I-55 became one of the longest bridges over water in the world. Its final cost was approximately $159 million (equivalent to $553 million in 2024), bringing the total construction cost of I-55 in Louisiana to about $181 million (equivalent to $629 million in 2024).

=== Worst road status and reconstruction ===
The first major repair project on I-55 was carried out during 1988 and 1989. It involved an $8.1-million (equivalent to $18.5 million in 2024) reconstruction of much of the Ponchatoula–Hammond bypass, which was the oldest portion of the highway. Another project before the turn of the century was the addition of a diamond interchange at LA 3234 (Wardline Road) near Hammond, improving access to Southeastern Louisiana University. After almost two decades in the works, this project was completed in the autumn of 1998.

By the end of the 20th century, the concrete pavement on I-55 north of Hammond had significantly deteriorated, giving the highway a reputation as one of the worst in the state. Its appearance atop a 2010 Reader's Digest list of "The 7 Worst Roads in America" was reported in the local media. Between 2008 and 2011, a $79.3-million (equivalent to $113 million in 2024) project was carried out that gave the entire stretch of I-55 from Hammond to the Mississippi state line a complete overhaul. This was accomplished by rubblizing the existing concrete surface to serve as a base for a new asphalt surface. Though shortening the life expectancy of the highway, this method had the benefit of being quicker and more cost-effective than replacing the concrete panels and would require less maintenance over time. Additionally, since I-55 is a designated hurricane evacuation route, the highway could be fully opened to traffic during construction within 48 hours' notice if needed.

== Exit list ==
Parish	Location	mi	km	Exit	Destinations	Notes
St. John the Baptist	LaPlace			Southern end of Manchac Swamp Bridge		
St. John the Baptist	LaPlace	0.000	0.000		I-10 east – New Orleans	Southern terminus; exit 210 on I-10
St. John the Baptist	Frenier	0.929– 1.127	1.495– 1.814	1	US 51 to I-10 – LaPlace, Baton Rouge	Southern end of US 51 concurrency; northbound entrance and southbound exit
St. John the Baptist	Ruddock	7.627– 8.290	12.274– 13.341	7	To Old Hwy 51 – Ruddock	
St. John the Baptist–Tangipahoa parish line	Manchac	14.401– 15.085	23.176– 24.277	Bridge over Pass Manchac		
Tangipahoa	Manchac	15.289– 15.950	24.605– 25.669	15	To Old Hwy 51 – Manchac	
Tangipahoa		22.982	36.986	Northern end of Manchac Swamp Bridge		
Tangipahoa		23.125– 23.228	37.216– 37.382	22	Frontage Road	Northbound entrance and southbound exit; to Old US 51 (local name)
Tangipahoa		23.456– 24.093	37.749– 38.774	23	US 51 Bus. – Ponchatoula	Southern terminus of US 51 Bus.
Tangipahoa	Ponchatoula	25.869– 26.491	41.632– 42.633	26	LA 22 – Ponchatoula, Springfield	To Tickfaw State Park
Tangipahoa	Hammond	28.368– 28.981	45.654– 46.640	28	US 51 north – Hammond	Northern end of US 51 concurrency
Tangipahoa	Hammond	29.224– 29.777	47.031– 47.921	29	I-12 – Slidell, Baton Rouge	Signed as exits 29A (east) and 29B (west); exit 38 on I-12
Tangipahoa	Hammond	31.195– 31.441	50.203– 50.599	31	US 190 – Hammond, Albany	
Tangipahoa		32.157– 32.805	51.752– 52.795	32	LA 3234 (University Avenue) / Wardline Road	Western terminus of LA 3234; to Southeastern Louisiana University
Tangipahoa	Tickfaw	36.254– 36.720	58.345– 59.095	36	LA 442 – Tickfaw	
Tangipahoa	Independence	40.828– 41.338	65.706– 66.527	40	LA 40 – Independence	
Tangipahoa	Amite City	46.789– 47.252	75.300– 76.045	46	LA 16 – Amite City, Montpelier	
Tangipahoa		50.518– 51.054	81.301– 82.163	50	LA 1048 – Arcola, Roseland	
Tangipahoa		53.555– 54.040	86.188– 86.969	53	LA 10 – Fluker, Greensburg	
Tangipahoa		56.840– 57.353	91.475– 92.301	57	LA 440 – Tangipahoa	
Tangipahoa	Kentwood	61.327– 61.795	98.696– 99.449	61	LA 38 – Kentwood, Liverpool	
Tangipahoa		64.743– 65.057	104.194– 104.699	Louisiana Welcome Center (southbound only)		
Tangipahoa		66.086	106.355		I-55 north – Jackson	Continuation in Mississippi
1.000 mi = 1.609 km; 1.000 km = 0.621 mi: Concurrency terminus; Incomplete access

== Notes ==
Interstate 55
Previous state: Terminus	Louisiana	Next state: Mississippi
