= Lebeau, Louisiana =

Lebeau
- Unincorporated community Census designated place
- Location within the state of Louisiana
- Coordinates: 30°43′43″N 91°58′27″W
- Country: United States
- State: Louisiana
- Parish: St. Landry
- Elevation: 32 ft (9.8 m)
- Time zone: UTC-6 (Central (CST))
  - Summer (DST): UTC-5 (CDT)
- ZIP code: 71345
- GNIS feature ID: 2831221

Lebeau (also spelled LeBeau and originally known as Bayou Petite Prairie) is an unincorporated community and census designated place (CDP) in St. Landry Parish, Louisiana, United States, in the central part of the state. Nearby communities include Palmetto, Ville Platte and Washington. The community is part of the Opelousas–Eunice Micropolitan Statistical Area. It is located at the intersection of U.S. Route 71 and Louisiana Highway 10.

== Name ==
The town was named after Fr Pierre Oscar Lebeau, SSJ, a Catholic priest with the Josephites who helped settle the town.The parish he founded, Immaculate Conception Catholic Church, still operates there.

== Demographics ==
Historical population
Census	Pop.	Note	%±

The United States Census Bureau defined Lebeau as a census designated place (CDP) in 2023.

== Agriculture ==
- Soybeans
- Corn

== Education ==
North Central High School (Hurricanes) - Grades 5–12.

== Events ==
Lebeau Zydeco Festival – an annual festival featuring performances from leading zydeco artists. As of 2018, the festival is hosting its 28th annual celebration. The festival is usually held on the first Saturday in July on the Immaculate Conception Catholic Church grounds.

== Notable people ==
- Fr Pierre Oscar Lebeau, SSJ – The town's namesake and first priest of Immaculate Conception Catholic Church.
- Sidney Simien (Rockin' Sidney) – Internationally famed Zydeco musician
