= Old Hammond Highway =

Old Hammond Highway may refer to:

- Old Hammond Highway (New Orleans), a remnant of the uncompleted New Orleans–Hammond Highway and intended route of U.S. Highway 51 in Louisiana
- Old Hammond Highway (Baton Rouge), a bypassed portion of U.S. Highway 190 now designated as Louisiana Highway 426
