= Ruddock, Louisiana =

- Ghost Town
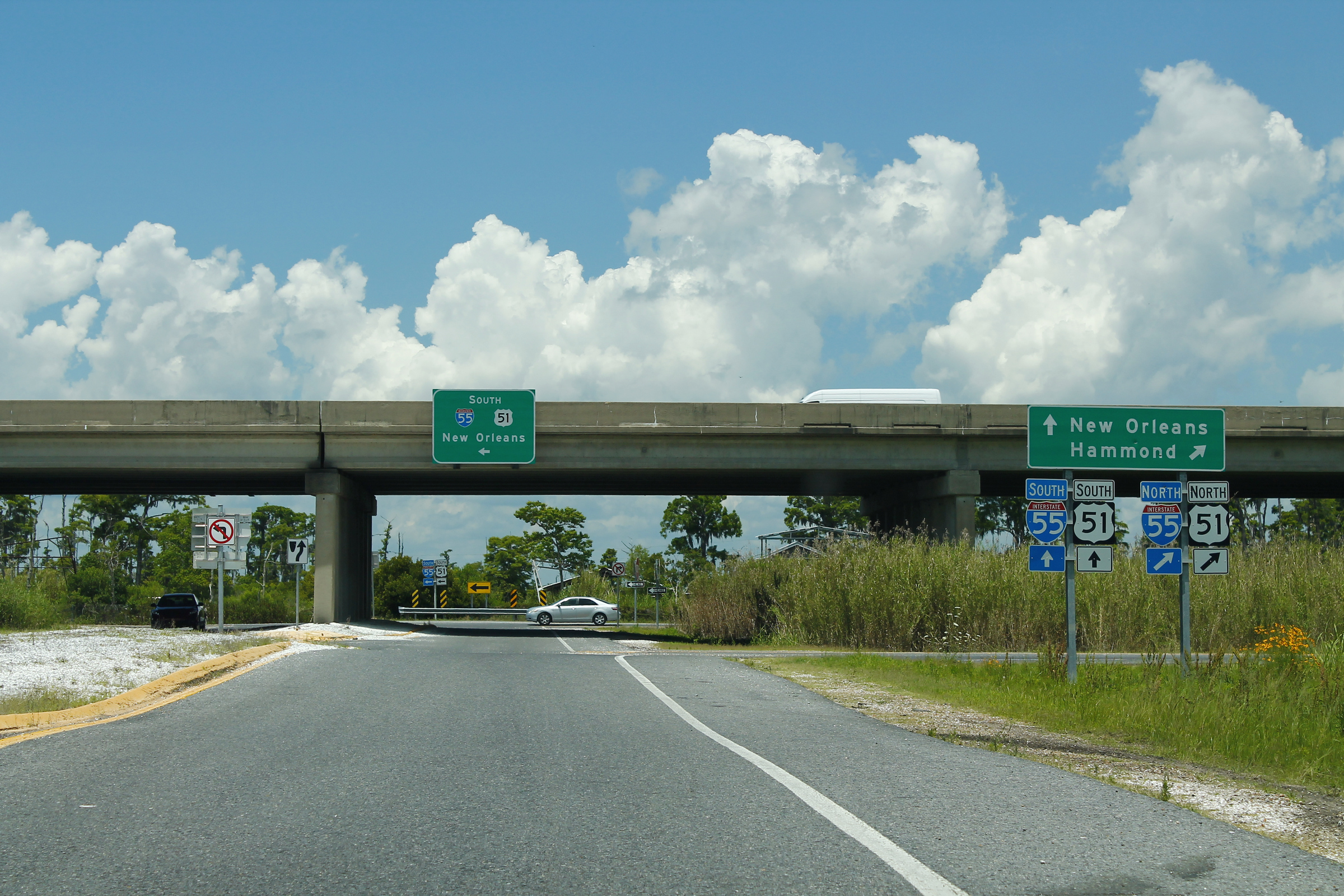
- The Ruddock exit off of the I-55 Manchac Swamp Bridge.

- Location within Louisiana
- Coordinates: 30°12′16″N 90°25′30″W
- Country: United States
- State: Louisiana
- Parish: St. John the Baptist
- Elevation: 3 ft (0.91 m)
- GNIS feature ID: 1628080

Ruddock is a ghost town in St. John the Baptist Parish, Louisiana, United States. Ruddock was located on an isthmus between Lake Maurepas and Lake Pontchartrain, 10 miles (16 km) north-northeast of LaPlace.

Although the town was destroyed by a hurricane in 1915, it is still signed as an exit on Interstate 55 and marked on Louisiana state highway maps, as of 2011.

== History ==
In 1892, William Burton and C. H. Ruddock founded the Ruddock Cypress Company. They constructed a sawmill and a town to serve their business; the town became Ruddock. In 1902, the sawmill burned down and was later rebuilt. By 1910, the town had a population of 700.

At the height of its prosperity, Ruddock was a progressive, booming community built on stilts above the black waters of the swamp. Stilt-supported wooden sidewalks ran the length of the village with walkways branching out to two-story houses on each side.

The vibrant village also boasted a community center, a blacksmith shop, a locomotive repair shop, an office and commissary for the Ruddock Cypress Lumber Company, a one-room schoolhouse, the Holy Cross Catholic Church, and a railroad depot with a two-story rooming house attached. The Owl Saloon, specializing in men's entertainment, was discreetly located about a half-mile south and down the line from the town.

There were no grocery stores in the isolated village, with housewives taking the daily train to New Orleans to do their shopping.

== Destruction ==
In September 1915, the 1915 New Orleans Hurricane hit Ruddock, destroying the town and killing 58 residents of Ruddock and the nearby town of Frenier. Ruddock has since become overgrown by vegetation, and all that remains of the settlement is decayed wood from the buildings.
