= Zachary Taylor Parkway =

Route information
- Length: 210 mi (340 km)

Major junctions
- West end: Alexandria, LA
- East end: Poplarville, MS

Location
- Country: United States
- States: Louisiana, Mississippi

Highway system

The Zachary Taylor Parkway is a highway that stretches from Alexandria, Louisiana, to Poplarville, Mississippi. The corridor traverses eight Louisiana parishes and one Mississippi county. Traveling through it, motorists encounter a diverse mix of small towns, scenic countryside, homegrown businesses, agricultural areas, tourist attractions, and plantations, but also areas beset by poverty.

== Route ==
The parkway extends approximately 210 miles (340 km), stretching from Interstate 49 (I-49) near Alexandria and Pineville on the west, crossing I-55 near Amite, and continuing all the way to I-59 near Poplarville.

The John James Audubon Bridge, completed and opened in 2011, is a Mississippi River crossing between Pointe Coupee and West Feliciana parishes in south central Louisiana. The bridge has the second longest cable-stayed span in the Western Hemisphere (after Mexico's Baluarte bridge, though its total length is four times that of the Mexican bridge) and replaces the ferry between the communities of New Roads and St. Francisville.
