= Louisiana Highway 62 =

State highway in Louisiana, United States

Louisiana Highway 62

Route information
- Maintained by Louisiana DOTD
- Length: 11.88 mi (19.12 km)
- Existed: 1955 renumbering–present

Major junctions
- South end: LA 10 in Sheridan
- North end: Local road (former MS 577) at Mississippi state line north of State Line

Location
- Country: United States
- State: Louisiana
- Parishes: Washington

Highway system
- Louisiana State Highway System; Interstate; US; State; Scenic
← US 61	→ US 63

Louisiana Highway 62 (LA 62) is a state highway located in Washington Parish, Louisiana. It runs 11.88 miles (19.12 km) in a north–south direction from LA 10 in Sheridan to the Mississippi state line north of State Line.

The route connects the small rural communities of Pine and State Line with LA 10, the main east–west route through Washington Parish. LA 10 leads to Bogalusa, the parish's largest city, as well as Franklinton, the parish seat. LA 62 follows a slightly winding route from southwest to northeast, but it serves a generally north–south function and is bannered accordingly.

== Route description ==
From the south, LA 62 begins at an intersection with LA 10 at a point known as Sheridan. LA 10 connects to Franklinton on the west and Bogalusa on the southeast. LA 62 proceeds north through a sparsely populated pine forest for 2.9 miles (4.7 km) before intersecting LA 436 in the small community of Pine. LA 436 parallels the route of LA 10 between Franklinton and a point north of Bogalusa. 0.6 miles (0.97 km) later, LA 62 curves to the northeast while LA 424 continues the route northward toward Thomas.

Over the next 5.1 miles (8.2 km), LA 62 makes a long northeastern curve through an area of mixed pine forest and horse farms before intersecting LA 438, another route connecting to Thomas on the west. LA 62 and LA 438 run concurrently for the next 1.5 miles (2.4 km) to an area known as State Line, where LA 438 turns east toward Angie. 1.2 miles (1.9 km) north of this junction is a second intersection with LA 424, at which LA 62 briefly curves to the east. Shortly after resuming its northeastern course, LA 62 reaches the Louisiana–Mississippi state line. The highway continues into Walthall County, Mississippi as a local road known as Old State Line Road (formerly Mississippi Highway 577), which leads toward Mississippi Highway 48 (MS 48) southeast of Tylertown.

LA 62 is classified as a rural major collector by the Louisiana Department of Transportation and Development (La DOTD). The posted speed limit is generally 55 mph (90 km/h), reduced to 45 mph (70 km/h) through Pine. Average daily traffic volume in 2013 is reported as 2,200 vehicles between Sheridan and Pine, decreasing to 1,150 between Pine and State Line, and again to 780 north of State Line. LA 62 is an undivided two-lane highway for its entire length.

== History ==
In the original Louisiana Highway system in use between 1921 and 1955, the modern LA 62 was part of three separate state highways. State Route 754 followed the route from the southern terminus to Pine, where it continued north along the present LA 424. State Route 469 followed the remainder of the route, briefly running concurrent with Route 754 before turning northeast toward State Line. Additionally, the portion of the highway immediately south of State Line was also part of State Route 262, which duplicated the modern LA 438 concurrency. All three routes were designated by the state legislature between 1928 and 1930 and remained in effect until the 1955 Louisiana Highway renumbering.

LA 62 was created in the 1955 renumbering, giving the Sheridan-State Line route a single highway designation.

La 62—From a junction with La 10 at or near Sheridan through or near Pine and State Line to the Mississippi State Line.

— 1955 legislative route description

The route of LA 62 has remained the same to the present day.

== Major intersections ==
The entire highway is in Washington Parish.

Location	mi	km	Destinations	Notes
Sheridan	0.0	0.0	LA 10 – Bogalusa, Franklinton	Southern terminus
Pine	2.9	4.7	LA 436	
	3.5	5.6	LA 424 north – Thomas, Hackley	Southern terminus of LA 424
	8.6	13.8	LA 438 west – Thomas	South end of LA 438 concurrency
State Line	10.1	16.3	LA 438 east – Angie	North end of LA 438 concurrency
	11.3	18.2	LA 424 south	Northern terminus of LA 424
	11.9	19.2	Old State Line Road (former MS 577)	Northern terminus; continuation in Mississippi
1.000 mi = 1.609 km; 1.000 km = 0.621 mi: Concurrency terminus
