= St. Francisville =

St. Francisville may refer to a place in the United States:

- St. Francisville, Illinois
- St. Francisville, Louisiana
  - New Roads-St. Francisville Ferry, crossing the Mississippi River
- St. Francisville, Missouri
