= Mississippi Highway 577 =

Highway in Mississippi

Mississippi Highway 577

Route information
- Maintained by MSHC
- Length: 7.6 mi (12.2 km)
- Existed: 1957–1967

Major junctions
- South end: LA 62 near Sandy Hook
- North end: MS 48 near Sandy Hook

Location
- Country: United States
- State: Mississippi
- Counties: Walthall

Highway system
- Mississippi State Highway System; Interstate; US; State
← MS 575	→ MS 583

Mississippi Highway 577 (MS 577) was a short highway located in southern Mississippi. It started at the Louisiana state line and traveled northwest, ending at MS 48, east of Tylertown. The route was designated in 1957, and was removed from the state highway system ten years later.

== Route description ==
As of 1965, the entire route of Mississippi Highway 577 (MS 577) was located within Walthall County. The highway started at the Louisiana state line, where Louisiana Highway 62 (LA 62) ended. MS 577 initially headed northwest along Old State Line Road, maintaining this direction until it reached Old Settlement Road, where it curved westward and then northward. The route continued north on Dexter Road, with additional westward shifts, before ending at a T-intersection with MS 48, approximately seven miles (11 km) from the state line. MS 577 was maintained by the Mississippi State Highway Commission, as part of the state highway system.

== History ==
The road that became MS 577 first appeared on maps in 1956. Less than half of it was paved. The designation appeared two year later. By 1967, the route was removed from the state highway system.

== Major intersections ==
The entire route was in Walthall County.

Location	mi	km	Destinations	Notes
	0.0	0.0	LA 62	
Dexter	7.6	12.2	MS 48	
1.000 mi = 1.609 km; 1.000 km = 0.621 mi
