= Southern Swamps Byway =

The Southern Swamps Byway is a Louisiana Scenic Byway that follows several different U.S. state highways, primarily:

- LA 22 from Sorrento to Ponchatoula; and
- I-55/US 51 frontage road from LaPlace to Ponchatoula.
