= John James Audubon Bridge (Mississippi River) =

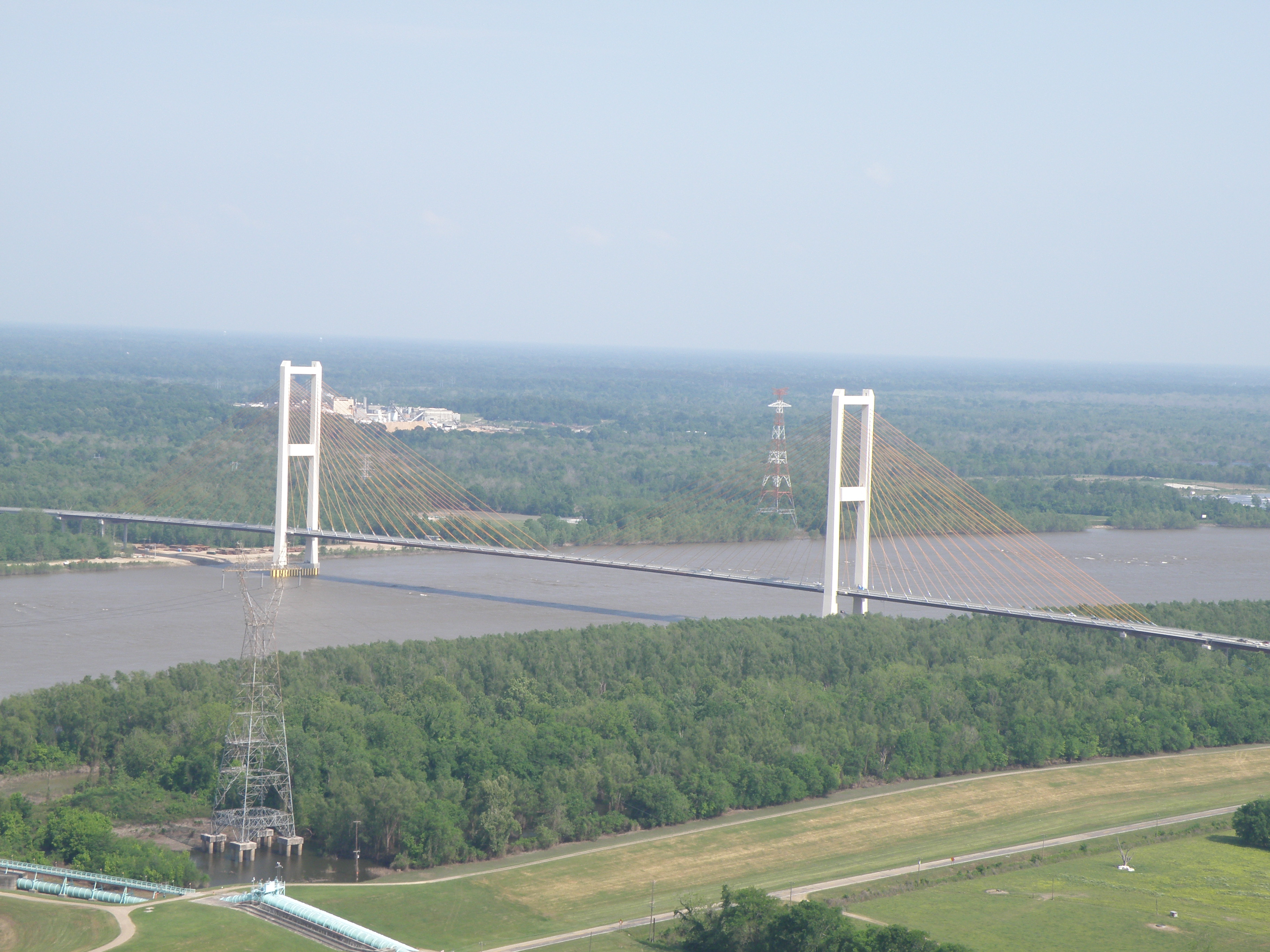
- Coordinates: 30°43′13.32″N 91°21′5.36″W
- Carries: 4 lanes of LA 10
- Crosses: Lower Mississippi River
- Locale: Pointe Coupee Parish, Louisiana, West Feliciana Parish, Louisiana
- Maintained by: LaDOTD

Characteristics
- Design: Cable-stayed bridge
- Total length: 12,883 ft (3,927 m)
- Width: 75.8 ft (23.1 m)
- Height: 520 ft (158 m)
- Longest span: 1,583 ft (482 m)
- Clearance below: 65 ft (20 m) minimum at HWL (High Water Level); the MHWL (Mean High Water Level) clearance is 76.2 ft (23.2 m); the LWL (Low Water Level) clearance is 116.1 ft (35.4 m)

History
- Construction cost: $409 million
- Opened: May 5, 2011
- Replaces: New Roads–St. Francisville Ferry

Location
- Interactive map of John James Audubon Bridge

The John James Audubon Bridge, completed and opened in May 2011, is a Lower Mississippi River crossing between Pointe Coupee and West Feliciana parishes in south central Louisiana. The bridge has the third longest cable-stayed span (distance between towers) in the Americas at 1,583 ft (482 m), after Mexico's Baluarte Bridge with a 1,706 ft (520 m) span, and has a total length of 12,883 ft (3,927 m)—nearly three-and-a-half times longer than the Baluarte Bridge's 3,688 ft (1,124 m) total length. The Audubon Bridge replaces the ferry between the communities of New Roads and St. Francisville. The bridge also serves as the only bridge structure on the Mississippi River between Natchez, Mississippi and Baton Rouge, Louisiana (approximately 90 river miles). The bridge conveys Louisiana Highway 10, which is in a concurrence there with the Zachary Taylor Parkway.

== Project ==
The Audubon Bridge corridor includes:

- A 2.44-mile (3.93 km) four-lane elevated bridge structure with two 11-foot (3.4 m) travel lanes in each direction with 8-foot (2.4 m) outside shoulders and 2-foot (0.61 m) inside shoulders
- Approximately 12 miles (19 km) of two-lane roadway connecting LA 1 east of Hospital Road and Major Parkway at New Roads to US 61 south of LA 966 and St. Francisville
- Four new intersections at existing LA 1, LA 10, LA 981 (River Road) and US 61 for entry to and exit from the new roadway and bridge

The bridge became officially connected across the Mississippi River on Wednesday, December 29, 2010. Completion for public use was not expected until June 2011; however, the bridge was opened on May 5, 2011 due to rising water levels on the Mississippi River, which had forced the closure of the ferry connection. The bridge is equipped with special finger type sliding joints in order to accommodate large movements between the decks. The 24-ton joints were designed by mageba, an international civil engineering firm, and allow a movement of 49 in (1.24 m).

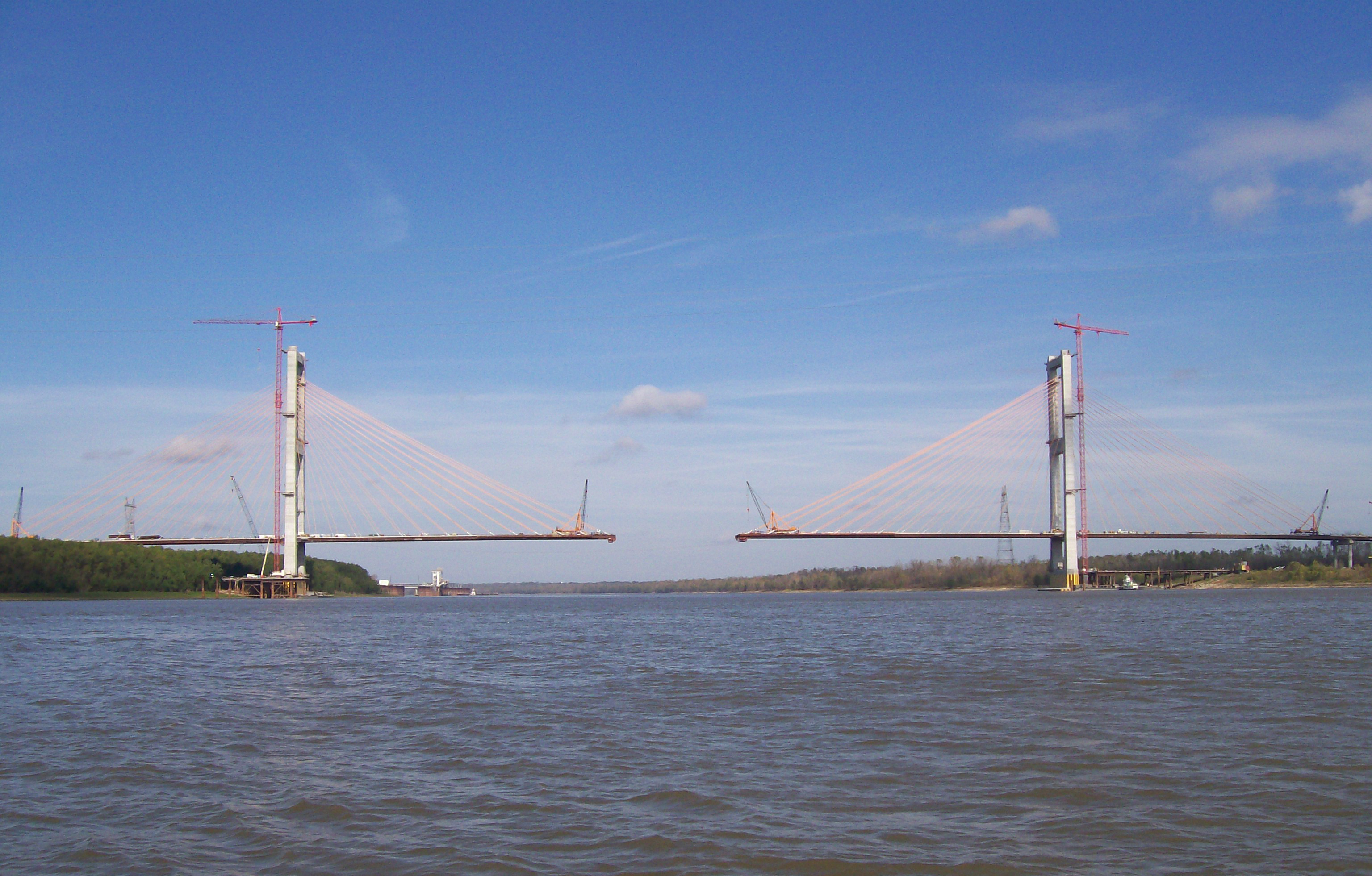
Construction progress as of December 4, 2010

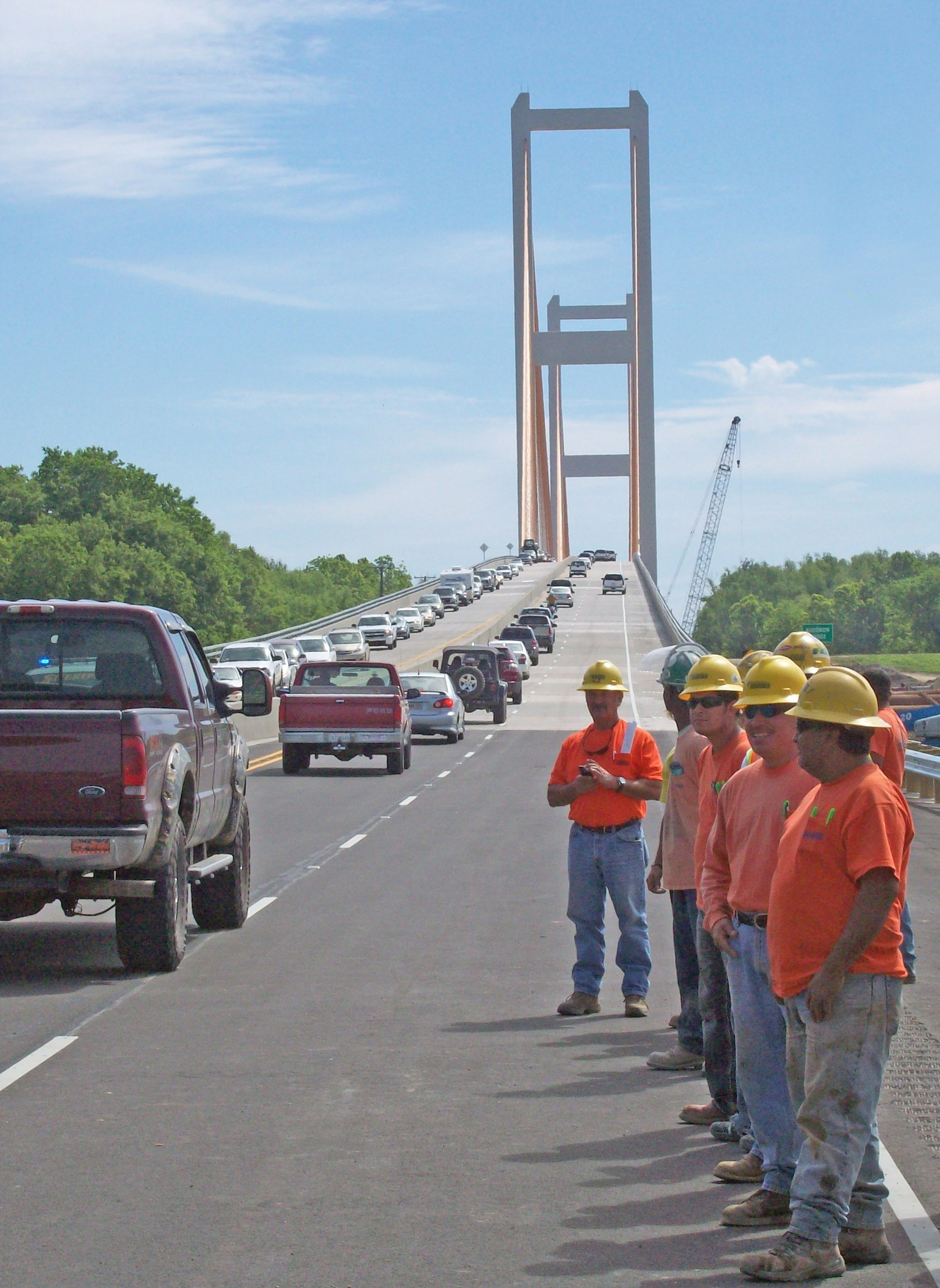
Traffic begins crossing the newly opened bridge

The project was constructed by Audubon Bridge Constructors, a joint venture of Flatiron Construction, Granite Construction and Parsons Transportation Group. The construction manager was Louisiana TIMED Managers, a joint venture of GEC, Inc., PB Americas, Inc., and LPA Group Incorporated. Upon completion, ownership of the bridge was turned over to the Louisiana Department of Transportation and Development.

As a gateway, it is intended to provide highway traffic where centuries of ferry crossings and longer commutes have been the norm.

Artist John James Audubon dedicated his life to painting all of the birds in North America. He painted 32 of his famous works in his Birds of America series while residing at Oakley Plantation at St. Francisville as a tutor to Eliza Pirrie in 1821. Naming the new bridge after Audubon is significant to the project because it exemplifies the importance and preservation of the rich natural history of the region.

In 2011, House Bill 200 was proposed in the Louisiana Legislature to rename the bridge the "Generals John A. Lejeune-Robert H. Barrow Bridge." Proponents of the measure argued that Audubon only spent a comparatively small amount of time in Louisiana and that there already existed twin bridges named after him spanning the Ohio River (those bridges have since been renamed the Bi-State Vietnam Gold Star Bridges). Additionally, they stated that Generals John A. Lejeune, originally from Pointe Coupee Parish, and Robert H. Barrow, originally from West Feliciana Parish, who both served as Commandant of the United States Marine Corps were more worthy of the honor. A compromise was reached and the bill was signed into law as Act No. 227, effective August 15, 2011. Per the signed final version of the law, although the bridge still retains Audubon's name, the east approach to the bridge has been named the "General Robert H. Barrow Memorial Approach" and the west approach has been named the "General John A. Lejeune Memorial Approach."

== Commendations ==
In its February 11, 2013 issue, the Engineering News-Record recognized the bridge with two positive citations; it designated the bridge as the winner of its transportation category, as well as for its overall "Editor's Choice" award, for being "the top construction project recently completed in the United States."

== Criticisms ==
In 1992, the bridge was estimated to cost $50 million, but it actually cost $409 million. It was estimated to be completed by 1998, but it actually was completed in 2011. It was estimated to carry 4,000 vehicles per day, but it actually averaged 2,887 vehicles per day, in its first year of operation (albeit still significantly more than the 720 vehicles per day that the old ferry used to transport). It is projected to increase traffic to 9,600 vehicles per day by 2026.

During the site selection process, the St. Francisville mayor discouraged putting the bridge near the old ferry landing, because it would affect the views of two historic homes and two cemeteries. The site that was ultimately chosen downriver, however, was also criticized for being south of Entergy's River Bend Nuclear Generating Station, meaning that if the St. Francisville area had to be evacuated due to issues at the nuclear power plant, the bridge would be useless as an evacuation route, despite the exceptional amount of tax dollars spent on it. There are even claims that the southerly location of the bridge has actually discouraged much of the expected increase in commerce between residents of New Roads and St. Francisville, because the much larger city of Zachary is not much further from the site of the bridge and offers many more retail options.

== See also ==
- List of crossings of the Lower Mississippi River
- List of longest cable-stayed bridge spans
