= Francisville, Georgia =

Unincorporated community in Georgia, U.S.

Coordinates: 32°40′28″N 84°05′28″W

Francisville is an unincorporated community in Crawford County, Georgia, United States.

== History ==
Francisville was founded in 1825. With the construction of the railroad in the 1850s, business activity shifted away from inland Francisville, and the town's population dwindled. A post office called Francisville was established in 1835, and remained in operation until 1856.
