= Stoney Point, Louisiana =

- Unincorporated community
- Location within Louisiana Location within the United States
- Coordinates: 30°49′06″N 90°16′43″W
- Country: United States
- State: Louisiana
- Parish: Washington
- Elevation: 259 ft (79 m)
- Time zone: UTC-6 (Central (CST))
  - Summer (DST): UTC-5 (CDT)
- Area code: 985
- GNIS feature ID: 542094
- FIPS code: 22-73430

Stoney Point is an unincorporated community in Washington Parish, Louisiana, United States. The community is located 8 miles (12.87 kilometres) W of Franklinton, Louisiana.
