= Manchac, Louisiana =

- Unincorporated community
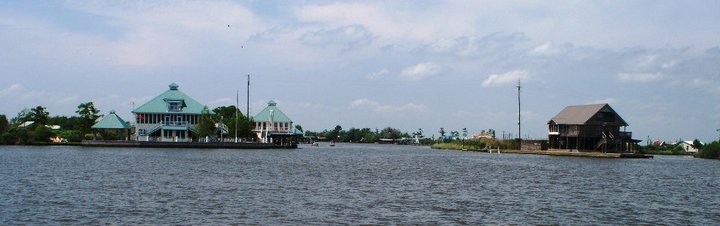
- This view toward the north from midstream in Pass Manchac shows its confluence with North Pass (center).

- Location of Manchac in Louisiana
- Coordinates: 30°17′30″N 90°24′07″W
- Country: United States
- State: Louisiana
- Parish: Tangipahoa
- Elevation: 3 ft (0.91 m)
- Time zone: UTC-6 (CST)
  - Summer (DST): UTC-5 (CDT)
- ZIP code: 70421
- Area code: 985

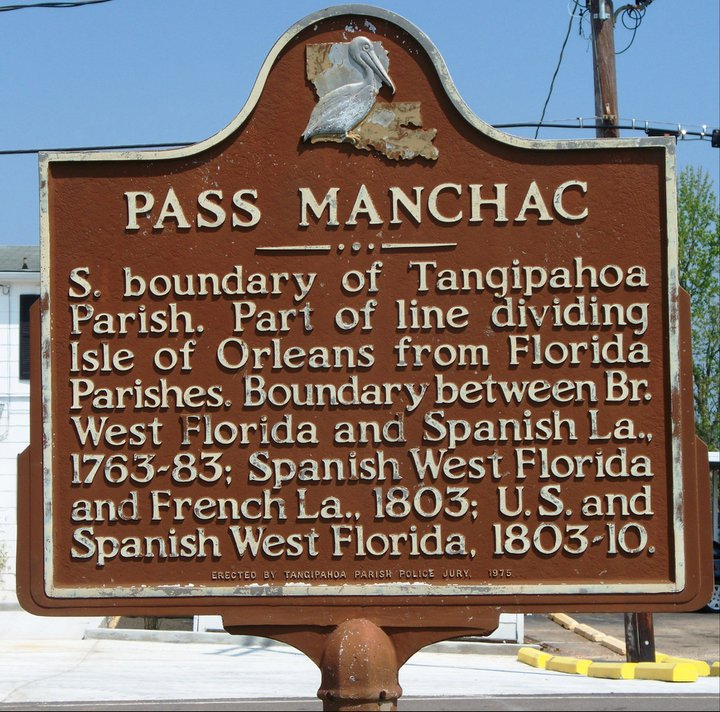
Historical marker in Manchac (Akers), Louisiana

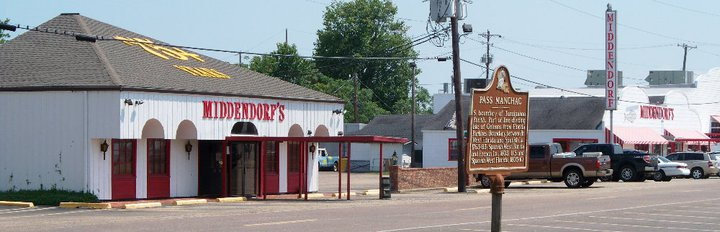
Middendorf Restaurant is, as of 2012, actually a sequence of three restaurants along old United States Highway 51. The view is toward the south.

Manchac (also known as Akers) is an unincorporated community in Tangipahoa Parish, Louisiana, United States.

== Etymology ==
Dr. John R. Swanton, a linguist who worked with Native American languages, suggested that the name Manchac is derived from Imashaka, which is a Choctaw word meaning "the rear entrance." An early Choctaw language dictionary written by Cyrus Byington defines the word im as a preposition meaning "place" and ashaka meaning "the back side or rear"

== Willie Akers ==
Willie Akers carried the same name as his father who founded the city of Ponchatoula. In the year 1871 Willie moved to Manchac with his family and built a house near a section of high ground that the locals called Jones Island. Then in the year 1875 Willie was appointed as the first postmaster of Manchac and served as the local telegraph operator. The local community became known as "Akers" during this period.

== History ==
Fort Bute or Manchac Post, named after the then British Prime Minister John Stuart, 3rd Earl of Bute, was established in 1763 at the junction of the Iberville River (Bayou Manchac) with the Mississippi River, and remained an important military and trading post in British West Florida until captured by Spanish forces under Luis de Unzaga who built a new fort, Manchak fort, in August of 1775; later, his brother-in-law Bernardo Galvez captured Manchac Fort from the English again on September 7, 1779, during what became known as the Battle of Fort Bute of the American Revolutionary War. Manchac was raided in February 1778 by American forces under the command of James Willing—see related articles, Continental Marines and USS Morris. Fort Bute/Manchac Post/Mississippi River at Bayou Manchac is 45 miles from Manchac.

The British used Manchac as a trading post with which the British agent in 1772 was reported to attempt to recruit a translator of Quapaw to undermine Spanish authority in Spanish Louisiana. Apparently it was a favorite object of deputy Indian agent John Thomas there.

When the New Orleans, Jackson and Great Northern railroad was commissioned in 1852, Manchac was one of the stations originally planned, which were generally at ten-mile intervals. Willie Akers' father, William Akers, was the founder and first mayor of the town of Ponchatoula, the next station to the north. Manchac straddles the railway, which, at the start of the 21st century, is part of the Canadian National Railway system.

The area was part of the Expedition to Pass Manchac and Ponchatoula during the American Civil War.

== Location ==
Manchac is located on Lake Maurepas on the Pass Manchac waterway, which connects to Lake Pontchartrain. The Manchac Swamp Bridge on Interstate 55 has exit and entrance ramps for Manchac. Also located here is the Port Manchac Distribution Center, with storage facilities and rail, truck, and water links to the east, west, and north.

Manchac is home to the ruins of one of the five lighthouses set up for Lake Pontchartrain, the Pass Manchac Light. The last lighthouse to be built on the north side of the entrance to Pass Manchac (the fourth one on that site) was completed in 1857. It was automated in 1941, and the dwelling was razed in 1952; the U.S. Coast Guard decommissioned the light and abandoned the property in 1987.

Hurricane Isaac destroyed the Pass Manchac Light structure in August 2012. However, the lantern room had previously been removed from the tower, for restoration purposes. Since 2008, Pass Manchac Light's lantern room has been located at the Lake Pontchartrain Basin Maritime Museum in Madisonville.

Manchac is known for fishing, duck hunting, seafood restaurants such as Middendorf's, and swamp tours. One of the entrances to the 8,328-acre (3,370 ha) Manchac Wildlife Management Area is located off Interstate 55.
