= Sunny Hill, Louisiana =

- Unincorporated community
- Location within Louisiana Location within the United States
- Coordinates: 30°55′28″N 90°19′38″W
- Country: United States
- State: Louisiana
- Parish: Washington
- Elevation: 249 ft (76 m)
- Time zone: UTC-6 (Central (CST))
  - Summer (DST): UTC-5 (CDT)
- Area code: 985
- GNIS feature ID: 556171
- FIPS code: 22-74010

Sunny Hill is an unincorporated community in Washington Parish, Louisiana, United States. The community is located 11 miles (17.70 kilometres) NW of Franklinton, Louisiana.
