= Manchac Swamp Bridge =

Bridge in Louisiana, US

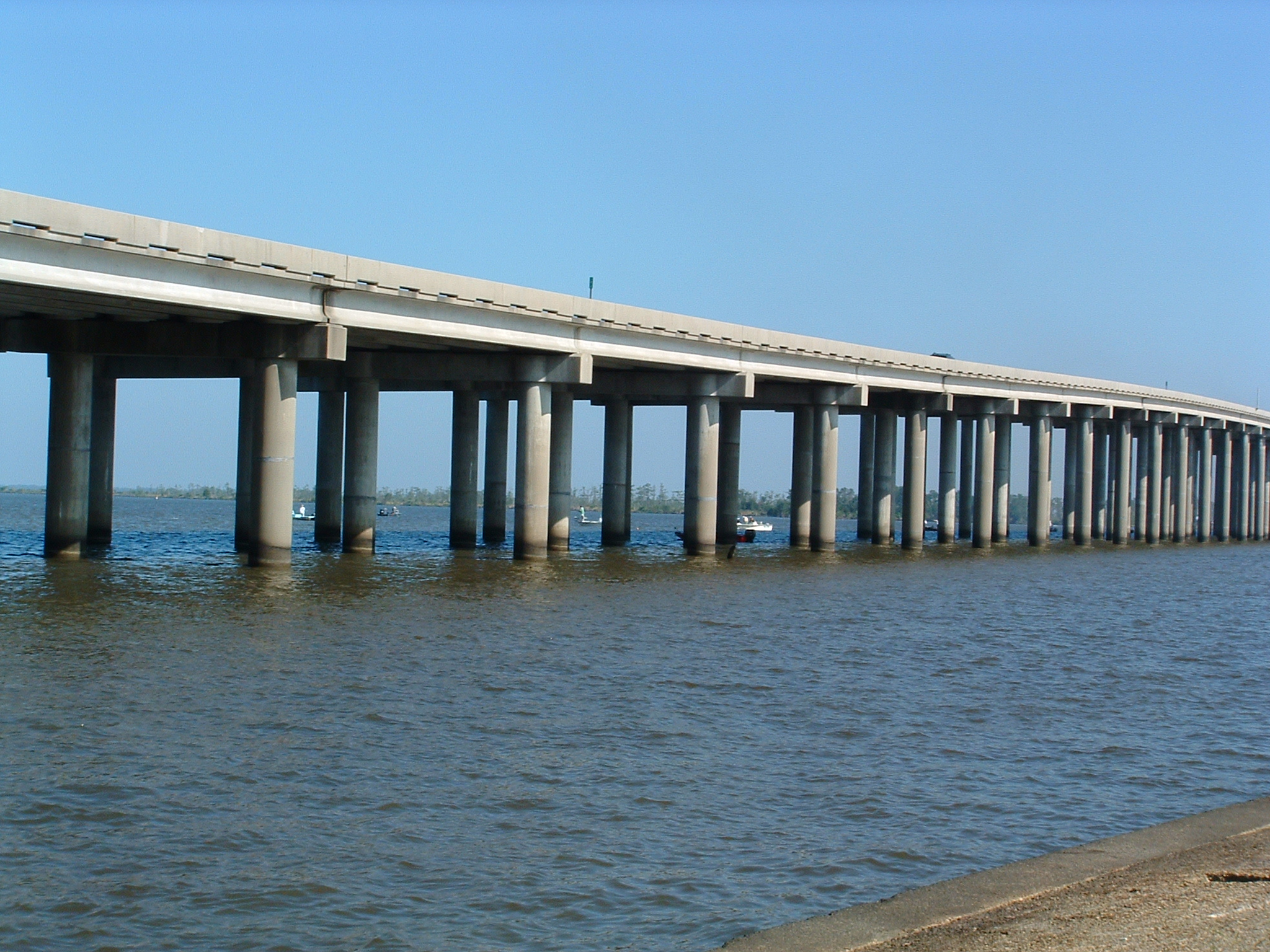
- Coordinates: 30.302946°N 90.405807°W
- Carries: I-55 / US 51
- Crosses: Manchac Swamp
- Locale: St. John the Baptist Parish / Tangipahoa Parish, Louisiana, USA
- Other name: I-55 Manchac Swamp Crossing
- Maintained by: LA DOTD

Characteristics
- Total length: 22.8 miles (36.7 km)
- Width: 312 feet (95 m)

History
- Opened: 1979

Location
- Interactive map of Manchac Swamp Bridge

The Manchac Swamp Bridge is a twin concrete trestle bridge near Manchac in the U.S. state of Louisiana. It carries Interstate 55 and U.S. Route 51 over the Manchac Swamp in Louisiana and represents a third of the highway's approximately 66 miles (106 km) in Louisiana.

With a total length of 22.80 miles (36.69 km), it is one of the longest bridges in the world over water, and is the longest bridge on the Interstate Highway System, and some claim it is the longest toll-free road bridge in the world.

Opened in 1979, with piles driven 250 feet (76 m) beneath the swamp, it cost $7 million per mile ($4.3 million/km), equivalent to $25 million per mile ($16 million/km) in 2025, to construct.

== 2023 Manchac Swamp Bridge Car Crash ==
The 2023 Manchac Swamp Bridge Car Crash occurred on October 23, 2023, on Interstate 55 in St. John the Baptist Parish, Louisiana. The incident was primarily caused by a combination of heavy fog and drifting smoke from nearby marsh fires, a phenomenon known as superfog. The crash took place on the elevated section of I-55, which spans from Ponchatoula to LaPlace over the swamplands below. During the crash, one vehicle fell into the water and partially sank, while over 100 motorists were left stranded until rescue services could reach the area. The collision involved 168 vehicles, resulting in 8 fatalities and 63 injuries. The severe conditions and scale of the accident posed significant challenges for emergency responders.

A satellite view of the Manchac Swamp bridge (to the left) and the nearby Pontchartrain bridge

== See also ==
- List of bridges in the United States
- List of longest bridges
