= New Roads–St. Francisville Ferry =

Ferry service in Louisiana, United States

Coordinates: 30.757°N 91.397°W

The New Roads–St. Francisville Ferry was a ferry service that connected Louisiana Highway 10 across the Mississippi River between New Roads and St. Francisville, Louisiana, United States. The normal operating hours for the 35-car ferry were 5 am to 9 pm, daily.

== History ==
The ferry was shut down on May 5, 2011, as the John James Audubon Bridge was opened early due to concerns about rising flood waters.

== See also ==
- List of crossings of the Lower Mississippi River
