= Palmetto, Louisiana =

- Village
- Village of Palmetto
- Location of Palmetto in St. Landry Parish, Louisiana.

- Location of Louisiana in the United States
- Coordinates: 30°43′04″N 91°54′29″W
- Country: United States
- State: Louisiana
- Parish: St. Landry

Area
  - Total: 0.90 sq mi (2.32 km^{2})
  - Land: 0.89 sq mi (2.30 km^{2})
  - Water: 0.012 sq mi (0.03 km^{2})
- Elevation: 36 ft (11 m)

Population (2020)
  - Total: 92
  - Density: 103.8/sq mi (40.06/km^{2})
- Time zone: UTC-6 (CST)
  - Summer (DST): UTC-5 (CDT)
- Area code: 337
- FIPS code: 22-58780
- GNIS feature ID: 2407518
- Website: palmetto-la.com

Palmetto is a village in St. Landry Parish, Louisiana, United States. As of the 2020 census, Palmetto had a population of 92. It is part of the Opelousas–Eunice Micropolitan Statistical Area.

== Geography ==
According to the United States Census Bureau, the village has a total area of 0.9 square miles (2.3 km^{2}), all land.

== Demographics ==
Historical population
Census	Pop.	Note	%±
1920	168		—
1930	408		142.9%
1940	444		8.8%
1950	457		2.9%
1960	430		−5.9%
1970	312		−27.4%
1980	327		4.8%
1990	229		−30.0%
2000	188		−17.9%
2010	164		−12.8%
2020	92		−43.9%
2025 (est.)	94	▲	2.2%
U.S. Decennial Census

=== 2020 census ===
Palmetto village, Louisiana – Racial and ethnic composition Note: the U.S. census treats Hispanic/Latino as an ethnic category. This table excludes Latinos from the racial categories and assigns them to a separate category. Hispanics/Latinos may be of any race.
Race / Ethnicity (NH = Non-Hispanic)	Pop 2000	Pop 2010	Pop 2020	% 2000	% 2010	2020
White alone (NH)	76	83	45	40.43%	50.61%	48.91%
Black or African American alone (NH)	108	74	40	57.45%	45.12%	43.48%
Native American or Alaska Native alone (NH)	0	0	0	0.00%	0.00%	0.00%
Asian alone (NH)	0	0	0	0.00%	0.00%	0.00%
Pacific Islander alone (NH)	0	0	0	0.00%	0.00%	0.00%
Some Other Race alone (NH)	0	0	1	0.00%	0.00%	1.09%
Mixed Race or Multi-Racial (NH)	2	7	3	1.06%	4.27%	3.26%
Hispanic or Latino (any race)	2	0	3	1.06%	0.00%	3.26%
Total	188	164	92	100.00%	100.00%	100.00%

As of the 2010 United States census, there were 164 people living in the village. The racial makeup of the village was 50.6% White, 45.1% Black and 4.3% from two or more races.

As of the census of 2000, there were 188 people, 75 households, and 48 families living in the village. The population density was 208.6 inhabitants per square mile (80.5/km^{2}). There were 94 housing units at an average density of 104.3 per square mile (40.3/km^{2}). The racial makeup of the village was 40.43% White, 58.51% African American, and 1.06% from two or more races. Hispanic or Latino of any race were 1.06% of the population. This does not account for the Creole/Cajun population; a distinct culture which is made up of several ethnic groups.

There were 75 households, out of which 32.0% had children under the age of 18 living with them, 38.7% were married couples living together, 21.3% had a female householder with no husband present, and 34.7% were non-families. 34.7% of all households were made up of individuals, and 14.7% had someone living alone who was 65 years of age or older. The average household size was 2.51 and the average family size was 3.24.

In the village, the population was spread out, with 31.9% under the age of 18, 9.0% from 18 to 24, 22.3% from 25 to 44, 18.6% from 45 to 64, and 18.1% who were 65 years of age or older. The median age was 33 years. For every 100 females, there were 97.9 males. For every 100 females age 18 and over, there were 80.3 males.

The median income for a household in the village was $28,750, and the median income for a family was $38,125. Males had a median income of $32,917 versus $11,250 for females. The per capita income for the village was $7,787. About 31.7% of families and 36.2% of the population were below the poverty line, including 38.7% of those under the age of eighteen and 32.1% of those 65 or over.

== In popular culture ==
Brit Bennett's second novel The Vanishing Half is based on her mother's memories of growing up in Palmetto. "She brought it up the way parents often do, like it’s something everybody knew...that there were towns where people would intermarry so that their children would get lighter with each generation."

== Notable person ==
- Morris Pejoe, (1924–1982), a Chicago blues singer, guitarist, and songwriter was born in Palmetto
