= Fluker, Louisiana =

- Unincorporated community
- Location within Louisiana Location within the United States
- Coordinates: 30°49′18″N 90°30′39″W
- Country: United States
- State: Louisiana
- Parish: Tangipahoa
- Elevation: 151 ft (46 m)
- Time zone: UTC-6 (Central (CST))
  - Summer (DST): UTC-5 (CDT)
- ZIP code: 70436
- Area code: 985
- GNIS feature ID: 554444

Fluker (also Hyde) is an unincorporated community in Tangipahoa Parish, Louisiana, United States. Its ZIP code is 70436.
