= Frenier, Louisiana =

Ghost town in Louisiana

- Unincorporated community
- Location within Louisiana Location within the United States
- Coordinates: 30°6′27″N 90°25′36″W
- Country: United States
- State: Louisiana
- Parish: St. John the Baptist
- Elevation: 0 ft (0 m)
- Time zone: UTC-6 (Central (CST))
  - Summer (DST): UTC-5 (CDT)
- ZIP code: 70049
- Area code: 985
- GNIS feature ID: 560801
- FIPS code: 22-27470

Frenier is a ghost town in St. John the Baptist Parish, in the U.S. state of Louisiana. The community is located less than 4 miles (6.4 kilometres) northeast of Laplace and 7 miles (11 kilometres) north of Montz.

== Schlösser ==
The community of Frenier was once known as Schlösser. Named after Martin Schlösser, an early German immigrant. Martin and his brother Adam began clearing out the forests and harvesting the local timber. Over the years more German settlers arrived and the village of Schlösser grew to over twenty-five families. With fierce competition in the timber industry the Schlösser brothers quit the business and converted to farming. Cabbage grew very well in the Louisiana soil and the brothers began exporting sauerkraut to New Orleans. Then in 1854 the New Orleans, Jackson, and Great Northern Railroad built a line through the area. During this time the fare for a train ride was only three cents per mile. Sauerkraut was exported up to Chicago, Illinois. Because the rail service to Chicago was only 40 hours, the sauerkraut export became very lucrative. For several decades the export of Frenier sauerkraut to the French Market and Chicago served as the main source of income for these families.

== Destruction ==
On September 29, 1915, the New Orleans Hurricane of 1915 destroyed the community of Frenier. Some of the locals sought refuge in the railroad depot, which collapsed during the hurricane and killed the 25 people hiding inside. In the aftermath it was determined that the hurricane killed 275 people and caused an estimated US$13,000,000 dollars in damage.

=== Legend of Julia Brown ===
Some of the surviving locals began telling stories of a voodoo priestess named Julia Brown that predicted the event. According to local historians the town of Frenier had no doctors and Julia Brown likely served as the local healer. When she got older she thought that the town folks were taking advantage of her, then a few months before she died she began repeating the phrase "One day I'm gonna die, and I'm gonna take all of you with me".

Survivors said that a few weeks before the hurricane arrived she began sitting on her front porch rocking back and forth while playing her guitar and singing:

When I die,

I take the whole town with me.
When I die,

I take the whole town.

— Julia Brown

According to the legend on September 29, 1915, Julia Brown died and most of the population gathered to bury the voodoo priestess. During the funeral at around four o'clock the hurricane arrived and completely destroyed the town. Some sources say she practiced Hoodoo and not Voodoo.
