= List of state highways in Louisiana (450–499) =

The following is a list of state highways in the U.S. state of Louisiana designated in the 450-499 range.

== Louisiana Highway 450 ==
Louisiana Highway 450
- Location: Folsom–Mt. Hermon
- Length: 27.69 mi (44.56 km)

Louisiana Highway 450 (LA 450) runs 27.69 miles (44.56 km) from Folsom to Mt. Hermon.

== Louisiana Highway 451 ==
Louisiana Highway 451
- Location: Moreauville–Hamburg
- Length: 30.07 mi (48.39 km)

Louisiana Highway 451 (LA 451) runs 30.07 miles (48.39 km) from Moreauville to Hamburg.

== Louisiana Highway 452 ==
Louisiana Highway 452
- Location: Marksville–Brouillette
- Length: 13.70 mi (22.05 km)

Louisiana Highway 452 (LA 452) runs 13.70 miles (22.05 km) from Marksville to Brouillette.

== Louisiana Highway 453 ==
Louisiana Highway 453
- Location: Moncla
- Length: 3.12 mi (5.02 km)

Louisiana Highway 453 (LA 453) runs 3.12 miles (5.02 km) in Moncla.

== Louisiana Highway 454 ==
Louisiana Highway 454
- Location: Cedar Grove–Effie
- Length: 13.75 mi (22.13 km)
- Existed: 1955–present

Louisiana Highway 454 (LA 454) runs 13.75 miles (22.13 km) in a general east–west direction from LA 107 at Cedar Grove, Rapides Parish to LA 107 and LA 115 in Effie, Avoyelles Parish.

LA 454 initially heads southeast from LA 107 (Old Marksville Highway) in Cedar Grove toward the Red River. After passing through an area known as Ruby, the route curves to the east and crosses from Rapides Parish into Avoyelles Parish. LA 454 then loops back to the northeast to a terminus at the concurrent LA 107 and LA 115 in Effie.

Parish	Location	mi	km	Destinations	Notes
Rapides	Cedar Grove	0.0	0.0	LA 107 (Old Marksville Highway)	Western terminus
Avoyelles	Effie	13.8	22.2	LA 107 / LA 115	Eastern terminus
1.000 mi = 1.609 km; 1.000 km = 0.621 mi

== Louisiana Highway 456 ==
Louisiana Highway 456
- Location: Lecompte
- Length: 7.12 mi (11.46 km)
- Existed: 1955–present

Louisiana Highway 456 (LA 456) runs 7.12 miles (11.46 km) in a north–south direction from US 71 at Loyd to LA 470 at Lamourie, Rapides Parish.

The entire route closely parallels US 71 (largely co-signed with US 167), running on the opposite side of the Union Pacific Railroad tracks through Meeker and Lecompte to Lamourie. In Lecompte, an intersection with LA 112 (Wall Street) connects to nearby I-49. LA 456 served as the original alignment of US 71 and its predecessor, the Jefferson Highway auto trail. It is an undivided two-lane highway for its entire length.

== Louisiana Highway 457 ==
Louisiana Highway 457
- Location: Lecompte–Echo
- Length: 19.62 mi (31.58 km)

Louisiana Highway 457 (LA 457) runs 19.62 miles (31.58 km) from Lecompte to Echo.

== Louisiana Highway 458 ==
Louisiana Highway 458
- Location: Pitkin–Fullerton
- Length: 5.45 mi (8.77 km)

Louisiana Highway 458 (LA 458) runs 5.45 miles (8.77 km) from Pitkin to Fullerton.

== Louisiana Highway 459 ==
Louisiana Highway 459
- Location: Jena–Aimwell
- Length: 11.16 mi (17.96 km)

Louisiana Highway 459 (LA 459) runs 11.16 miles (17.96 km) from Jena to Aimwell.

== Louisiana Highway 460 ==
Louisiana Highway 460
- Location: Nebo–Whitehall
- Length: 7.21 mi (11.60 km)
- Existed: 1955–present

Louisiana Highway 460 (LA 460) runs 7.21 miles (11.60 km) in an east–west direction from LA 127 in Nebo to a junction with US 84 and LA 8 at Whitehall, La Salle Parish.

The entire highway is in La Salle Parish.

Location	mi	km	Destinations	Notes
Nebo	0.0	0.0	LA 127 – Jena, Rogers	Western terminus
Whitehall	7.2	11.6	US 84 / LA 8 – Jena, Jonesville	Eastern terminus
1.000 mi = 1.609 km; 1.000 km = 0.621 mi

== Louisiana Highway 461 ==
Louisiana Highway 461
- Location: Calcasieu–Hineston
- Length: 4.85 mi (7.81 km)

Louisiana Highway 461 (LA 461) runs 4.85 miles (7.81 km) from Calcasieu to Hineston.

== Louisiana Highway 462 ==
Louisiana Highway 462
- Location: Westport
- Length: 9.38 mi (15.10 km)

Louisiana Highway 462 (LA 462) runs 9.38 miles (15.10 km) in Westport.

== Louisiana Highway 463 ==
Louisiana Highway 463
- Location: Pitkin–Afeman
- Length: 17.32 mi (27.87 km)

Louisiana Highway 463 (LA 463) runs 17.32 miles (27.87 km) from Pitkin to Afeman.

== Louisiana Highway 464 ==
Louisiana Highway 464
- Location: Merryville–Caney
- Length: 19.80 mi (31.87 km)

Louisiana Highway 464 (LA 464) runs 19.80 miles (31.87 km) from Merryville to Caney.

== Louisiana Highway 465 ==
Louisiana Highway 465
- Location: Kurthwood–Otis
- Length: 30.77 mi (49.52 km)

Louisiana Highway 465 (LA 465) runs 30.77 miles (49.52 km) from Kurthwood to Otis.

== Louisiana Highway 466 ==
Louisiana Highway 466
- Location: Gretna
- Length: 0.85 mi (1,370 m)
- Existed: 1955–present

Louisiana Highway 466 (LA 466) runs 0.85 miles (1.37 km) in an east–west direction along 5th and Kepler Streets in Gretna from LA 18 (Lafayette Street) to LA 23 (Franklin Avenue). It is an undivided two-lane highway for its entire length. As of 2019, it is under agreement to be removed from the state highway system and transferred to local control.

The entire highway is in Gretna, Jefferson Parish.

mi	km	Destinations	Notes
0.00	0.00	LA 18 (5th Street, Lafayette Street)	Western terminus
0.83	1.34	LA 23 (Franklin Avenue)	Eastern terminus
1.000 mi = 1.609 km; 1.000 km = 0.621 mi

LA 466 originally consisted of 16 hyphenated routes designated in the 1955 Louisiana Highway renumbering. All were located within Gretna, unless otherwise noted:

- LA 466-1 (3.2 miles): Patterson Drive, Algiers (Orleans Parish) from LA 428 (General Meyer Avenue) near the Algiers Canal to Merrill Street; part of pre-1955 State Route 996.
- LA 466-2 (1.1 miles): Monroe Street from Kepler Street to the Orleans Parish line; part of pre-1955 State Route 30-D.
- LA 466-3 (0.9 miles): 1st Street from Huey P. Long Avenue to Weidman Street; pre-1955 State Route 2-D and later State Route 2084.
- LA 466-4 (0.4 miles): Weidman Street from Washington Street to Hancock Street; pre-1955 State Route 1241.
- LA 466-5 (0.4 miles): Virgil Street from Hamilton Street to Hancock Street; pre-1955 State Route 1240.
- LA 466-6 (1.0 mile): Madison Street from Virgil Street to the Orleans Parish line; pre-1955 State Route 1242.
- LA 466-7 (1.1 miles): Hancock Street from Kepler Street in Gretna to Socrates Street in Algiers; pre-1955 State Route 30-E. (Removed 1961)
- LA 466-8 (1.3 miles): Hamilton Street from Washington Street to Whitney Avenue; pre-1955 State Route 1239. (Removed 1962)
- LA 466-9 (0.3 miles): 2nd Street from Huey P. Long Avenue to Lafayette Street; part of pre-1955 State Route C-1474.
- LA 466-10 (0.9 miles): 5th and Kepler Streets from Lafayette Street to Hancock Street; part of pre-1955 State Routes 30-D and 30-E. (Removed 1972)
- LA 466-11 (0.4 miles): Lavoisier Street from 7th Street to 1st Street; pre-1955 State Route 1237.
- LA 466-12 (0.6 miles): Newton Street from 11th Street to 1st Street; pre-1955 State Route 1238.
- LA 466-13 (0.3 miles): Huey P. Long Avenue from 10th Street to 5th Street; pre-1955 State Route 451.
- LA 466-14 (0.9 miles): Derbigny Street from 14th Street to 1st Street; pre-1955 State Route 456.
- LA 466-15 (0.6 miles): Dolhonde Street from 11th Street to 1st Street; pre-1955 State Route 1236.
- LA 466-16 (0.2 miles): Lafayette Street from 5th Street to 2nd Street; part of pre-1955 State Route C-1474.

All of the above routes were deleted with the exception of LA 466-10, which was shortened by one block on the east end and renumbered to simply LA 466.

== Louisiana Highway 467 ==
Louisiana Highway 467
- Location: Leesville
- Length: 3.29 mi (5.29 km)

Louisiana Highway 467 (LA 467) runs 3.29 miles (5.29 km) in Leesville.

== Louisiana Highway 468 ==
Louisiana Highway 468
- Location: Leesville
- Length: 5.80 mi (9.33 km)

Louisiana Highway 468 (LA 468) runs 5.80 miles (9.33 km) in Leesville.

== Louisiana Highway 469 ==
Louisiana Highway 469
- Location: Fort Johnson North
- Length: 2.45 mi (3.94 km)

Louisiana Highway 469 (LA 469) runs 2.45 miles (3.94 km) in Fort Johnson North.

== Louisiana Highway 470 ==
Louisiana Highway 470
- Location: Lamourie–Chambers
- Length: 4.21 mi (6.78 km)

Louisiana Highway 470 (LA 470) runs 4.21 miles (6.78 km) from Lamourie to Chambers.

== Louisiana Highway 471 ==
Louisiana Highway 471
- Location: Colfax–Atlanta
- Length: 17.65 mi (28.40 km)
- Existed: 1955–present

Louisiana Highway 471 (LA 471) runs 17.65 miles (28.40 km) in a north–south direction from US 71 north of Colfax, Grant Parish to LA 34 west of Atlanta, Winn Parish.

The route heads north from US 71, traveling through timber lands and hills. In Verda, the route turns slightly westward and runs concurrent with LA 122 for about 1 mile (1.6 km). After turning back to the north, LA 471 crosses from Grant Parish into Winn Parish, where it continues to an intersection with LA 34 just outside Atlanta. LA 471 is an undivided two-lane highway for its entire length.

Before the 1955 renumbering, LA 471 was a small part of State Route 5, which was followed by the original alignment of US 167.

Parish	Location	mi	km	Destinations	Notes
Grant		0.0	0.0	US 71	Southern terminus
Grant		8.7	14.0	LA 122 east – Dry Prong	South end of LA 122 concurrency
Grant	Verda	10.0	16.1	LA 122 west – Montgomery	North end of LA 122 concurrency
Winn		17.8	28.6	LA 34	Northern terminus
1.000 mi = 1.609 km; 1.000 km = 0.621 mi

== Louisiana Highway 472 ==
Louisiana Highway 472
- Location: Willians–Winnfield
- Length: 20.24 mi (32.57 km)
- Existed: 1955–present

Louisiana Highway 472 (LA 472) runs 20.24 miles (32.57 km) in a north–south direction from US 167 at Williana, Grant Parish to a second junction with US 167 southeast of Winnfield, Winn Parish. Despite its physical direction, LA 472 is signed east–west.

LA 472 heads northeast from US 167 through the Kisatchie National Forest in Grant Parish and makes a jog at LA 500. The route then proceeds due north and crosses into Winn Parish. After a few miles, LA 472 curves to the northwest and rejoins US 167 about 4 miles (6.4 km) south of Winnfield.

LA 472 is an undivided two-lane highway for its entire length. Before the 1955 Louisiana Highway renumbering, LA 472 was designated as State Route 232.

Parish	Location	mi	km	Destinations	Notes
Grant	Williana	0.0	0.0	US 167 – Winnfield, Alexandria	
Grant	Zion	8.8	14.2	LA 500 west	South end of LA 500 concurrency
Grant	Zion	9.1	14.6	LA 500 east	North end of LA 500 concurrency
Grant–Winn parish line		10.7	17.2	LA 1230 east	Western terminus of LA 1230
Winn		20.3	32.7	US 167 – Winnfield, Alexandria	
1.000 mi = 1.609 km; 1.000 km = 0.621 mi: Concurrency terminus

== Louisiana Highway 473 ==
Louisiana Highway 473
- Location: Toro–Hornbeck
- Length: 8.27 mi (13.31 km)

Louisiana Highway 473 (LA 473) runs 8.27 miles (13.31 km) from Toro to Hornbeck.

== Louisiana Highway 474 ==
Louisiana Highway 474
- Location: Negreet–Florien
- Length: 7.82 mi (12.59 km)

Louisiana Highway 474 (LA 474) runs 7.82 miles (12.59 km) from Negreet to Florien.

== Louisiana Highway 475 ==
Louisiana Highway 475
- Location: Zwolle
- Length: 0.66 mi (1,060 m)

Louisiana Highway 475 (LA 475) runs 0.66 miles (1.06 km) in Zwolle.

== Louisiana Highway 476 ==
Louisiana Highway 476
- Location: Negreet
- Length: 4.70 mi (7.56 km)

Louisiana Highway 476 (LA 476) runs 4.70 miles (7.56 km) in Negreet.

== Louisiana Highway 477 ==
Louisiana Highway 477
- Location: St. Maurice
- Length: 7.72 mi (12.42 km)

Louisiana Highway 477 (LA 477) runs 7.72 miles (12.42 km) in St. Maurice.

== Louisiana Highway 478 ==
Louisiana Highway 478
- Location: Vowells Mill–Natchez
- Length: 20.87 mi (33.59 km)
- Existed: 1955–present

Louisiana Highway 478 (LA 478) runs 20.87 miles (33.59 km) in a southwest to northeast direction from a junction with two parish roads at Vowells Mill to LA 1 in Natchitoches. It is located entirely within Natchitoches Parish.

LA 478 heads east from Vowells Mill through the Kisatchie National Forest. It crosses both LA 117 and LA 120 before passing through an interchange with I-49 at Exit 132 just inside the Natchitoches city limits. (The route is co-signed with Natchitoches Parish Route 620 in this vicinity). LA 478 proceeds northeast to a point on LA 1 about 2 miles (3.2 km) north of Natchez. LA 478 is an undivided two-lane highway for its entire length.

Before the 1955 Louisiana Highway renumbering, LA 478 was signed as State Route 609 from Vowels Mill to LA 117 and as State Route 432 for the remainder of the route.

The entire highway is in Natchitoches Parish.

Location	mi	km	Destinations	Notes
Vowells Mill	0.0	0.0	PR 150 (Red Rock Road) / PR 745 (Provencal-Vowells Mill Road, Tom Lee Road)	Southwestern terminus
	5.2	8.4	LA 117	
Flora	13.0	20.9	LA 120 west	West end of LA 120 concurrency
Flora	13.1	21.1	LA 120 east	East end of LA 120 concurrency
Natchitoches	16.7– 17.0	26.9– 27.4	I-49 – Alexandria, Shreveport	Exit 132 on I-49
Natchitoches	21.0	33.8	LA 1	Northeastern terminus
1.000 mi = 1.609 km; 1.000 km = 0.621 mi: Concurrency terminus

== Louisiana Highway 479 ==
Louisiana Highway 479
- Location: Chestnut–Goldonna
- Length: 7.78 mi (12.52 km)

Louisiana Highway 479 (LA 479) runs 7.78 miles (12.52 km) from Chestnut to Goldonna.

== Louisiana Highway 480 ==
Louisiana Highway 480
- Location: Coushatta–Clear Lake
- Length: 24.5 mi (39.4 km)

Louisiana Highway 480 (LA 480) runs 24.5 miles (39.4 km) from Coushatta to Clear Lake.

== Louisiana Highway 481 ==
Louisiana Highway 481
- Location: De Soto Parish
- Length: 10.96 mi (17.64 km)

Louisiana Highway 481 (LA 481) runs 10.96 miles (17.64 km) in De Soto Parish.

== Louisiana Highway 482 ==
Louisiana Highway 482
- Location: Toledo Bend Reservoir–Zwolle
- Length: 7.47 mi (12.02 km)

Louisiana Highway 482 (LA 482) runs 7.47 miles (12.02 km) from the Toledo Bend Reservoir to Zwolle.

== Louisiana Highway 483 ==
Louisiana Highway 483
- Location: Noble–Pelican
- Length: 16.46 mi (26.49 km)
- Existed: 1955–present

Louisiana Highway 483 (LA 483) runs 16.46 miles (26.49 km) in a north–south direction from US 171 in Noble, Sabine Parish to LA 175 in Pelican, DeSoto Parish.

The route heads northeast from US 171 in Noble and curves due north at Sardis. Reaching Oak Grove, a point east of Converse, LA 483 turns east in a brief concurrency with LA 174 before resuming its northward course at Mitchell. It proceeds in a general northeast direction and encounters a series of curves as it crosses from Sabine Parish into DeSoto Parish. Soon after crossing the parish line, LA 483 heads due north again and intersects LA 512. It immediately curves northeast into the small community of Pelican where it intersects LA 513. LA 483 proceeds a short distance to its terminus at LA 175 on the east side of town. It is an undivided two-lane highway for its length.

== Louisiana Highway 484 ==
Louisiana Highway 484
- Location: Natchitoches Parish
- Length: 9.76 mi (15.71 km)

Louisiana Highway 484 (LA 484) runs 9.76 miles (15.71 km) in Natchitoches Parish.

== Louisiana Highway 485 ==
Louisiana Highway 485
- Location: Robeline–Powhatan
- Length: 16.90 mi (27.20 km)

Louisiana Highway 485 (LA 485) runs 16.90 miles (27.20 km) from Robeline to Powhatan.

== Louisiana Highway 486 ==
Louisiana Highway 486
- Location: Clarence–Black Lake
- Length: 13.9 mi (22.4 km)

Louisiana Highway 486 (LA 486) runs 13.9 miles (22.4 km) from Clarence to Black Lake.

== Louisiana Highway 487 ==
Louisiana Highway 487
- Location: Marthaville–Ajax
- Length: 10.00 mi (16.09 km)

Louisiana Highway 487 (LA 487) runs 10.00 miles (16.09 km) from Marthaville to Ajax.

== Louisiana Highway 488 ==
Louisiana Highway 488
- Location: Lisso–Alexandria
- Length: 17.15 mi (27.60 km)

Louisiana Highway 488 (LA 488) runs 17.15 miles (27.60 km) from Lisso to Alexandria.

== Louisiana Highway 489 ==
Louisiana Highway 489
- Location: Lacamp
- Length: 8.41 mi (13.53 km)

Louisiana Highway 489 (LA 489) runs 8.41 miles (13.53 km) in Lacamp.

== Louisiana Highway 490 ==
Louisiana Highway 490
- Location: Natchitoches Parish
- Length: 14.96 mi (24.08 km)
- Existed: 1955–present

Louisiana Highway 490 (LA 490) runs 14.96 miles (24.08 km) in a general east–west direction from a local road in Janie to the Red River east of Marco, Natchitoches Parish.

LA 490 is an undivided, surfaced two-lane highway that continues the path of a dirt local road northeast through Janie. In Chopin, the highway passes through a diamond interchange with I-49 (exit 113) and crosses the Union Pacific Railroad line at grade. It then passes the entrance to the Martco lumber factory and crosses over the Cane River. At a T-intersection with LA 1, LA 490 turns southeast and runs concurrent with that highway for 2.4 miles (3.9 km) and crosses the Cane River a second time. LA 490 turns northeast off of LA 1 and winds through Galbraith and Marco, intersecting LA 3279 between those points. At the end of its route, LA 490 provides access to, and makes a loop in front of, the Red River Lock & Dam #3.

For a time, LA 490 resumed on the opposite bank of the Red River in Colfax, following Faircloth and 2nd Streets to a junction with LA 8. A spur continued along Faircloth Street past 2nd Street to a junction with LA 158. Prior to the 1930s, the two segments of LA 490 were connected by the West End Ferry. During this time, LA 490 was designated as State Route 431 in the original state highway system, which was in use from 1921 to 1955.

The entire highway is in Natchitoches Parish.

Location	mi	km	Destinations	Notes
Janie	0.0	0.0	Begin state maintenance	Western terminus
Chopin	3.4– 3.5	5.5– 5.6	I-49 – Alexandria, Shreveport	Exit 113 on I-49
	5.2	8.4	LA 1 north	West end of LA 1 concurrency
Galbraith	7.5	12.1	LA 1 south	East end of LA 1 concurrency
	10.6	17.1	LA 3279 south	Northern terminus of LA 3279
	14.6	23.5	End state maintenance	Eastern terminus
1.000 mi = 1.609 km; 1.000 km = 0.621 mi: Concurrency terminus

== Louisiana Highway 491 ==
Louisiana Highway 491
- Location: Cloutierville–Odra
- Length: 7.84 mi (12.62 km)

Louisiana Highway 490 (LA 490) runs 7.84 miles (12.62 km) from Cloutierville to Odra.

== Louisiana Highway 492 ==
Louisiana Highway 492
- Location: Grant Parish
- Length: 5.61 mi (9.03 km)
- Existed: 1955–present

Louisiana Highway 492 (LA 492) runs 5.61 miles (9.03 km) in an east–west direction from LA 8 south of Colfax to US 71 at Bagdad, Grant Parish.

A rural route connecting US 71 and LA 8 south of Colfax, LA 492 served as the original alignment of both US 71 and its predecessor, the Jefferson Highway auto trail. It is an undivided two-lane highway for its length.

The entire highway is in Grant Parish.

Location	mi	km	Destinations	Notes
	0.0	0.0	LA 8 – Boyce, Colfax	Western terminus
Bagdad	5.6	9.0	US 71 – Alexandria, Shreveport	Eastern terminus
1.000 mi = 1.609 km; 1.000 km = 0.621 mi

== Louisiana Highway 493 ==
Louisiana Highway 493
- Location: Montrose–Melrose
- Length: 5.81 mi (9.35 km)

Louisiana Highway 493 (LA 493) runs 5.81 miles (9.35 km) from Montrose to Melrose.

== Louisiana Highway 494 ==
Louisiana Highway 494
- Location: Cypress–Natchitoches
- Length: 15.07 mi (24.25 km)

Louisiana Highway 494 (LA 494) runs 15.07 miles (24.25 km) from Cypress to Natchitoches.

== Louisiana Highway 495 ==
Louisiana Highway 495
- Location: Cloutierville
- Length: 5.15 mi (8.29 km)

Louisiana Highway 495 (LA 495) runs 5.15 miles (8.29 km) in Cloutierville.

== Louisiana Highway 496 ==
Louisiana Highway 496
- Location: McNutt–Alexandria
- Length: 10.67 mi (17.17 km)
- Existed: 1955–present

Louisiana Highway 496 (LA 496) runs 10.67 miles (17.17 km) in an east–west direction from LA 121 at McNutt to a junction with US 71, US 165, and LA 28 in Alexandria, Rapides Parish.

== Louisiana Highway 497 ==
Louisiana Highway 497
- Location: Glenmora–Forest Hill
- Length: 8.39 mi (13.50 km)

Louisiana Highway 497 (LA 497) runs 8.39 miles (13.50 km) from Glenmora to Forest Hill.

== Louisiana Highway 498 ==
Louisiana Highway 498
- Location: Alexandria
- Length: 5.09 mi (8.19 km)

Louisiana Highway 498 (LA 498) runs 5.09 miles (8.19 km) in Alexandria.

== Louisiana Highway 499 ==
Louisiana Highway 499
- Location: Joyce–Zoar
- Length: 31.80 mi (51.18 km)

Louisiana Highway 499 (LA 499) runs 31.80 miles (51.18 km) from Joyce to Zoar.
