= National Register of Historic Places listings in Winn Parish, Louisiana =

Location of Winn Parish in Louisiana

This is a list of the National Register of Historic Places listings in Winn Parish, Louisiana.

This is intended to be a complete list of the properties on the National Register of Historic Places in Winn Parish, Louisiana, United States. The locations of National Register properties for which the latitude and longitude coordinates are included below, may be seen in a map.

There are 6 properties listed on the National Register in the parish. Another two properties were once listed, but have since been removed.

This National Park Service list is complete through NPS recent listings posted November 28, 2025.

== Current listings ==
	Name on the Register	Image	Date listed	Location	City or town	Description
1	Brister School House	Brister School House	August 2, 2001 (#01000808)	Parish Road 240 and Brister School Rd. 32°00′01″N 92°27′34″W	Sikes	
2	Gum Springs Recreation Area	Gum Springs Recreation Area	December 7, 2010 (#10000986)	12312 US 84 West, Kisatchie National Forest; 31°53′51″N 92°47′16″W	Winnfield vicinity	
3	George Parker Long House	George Parker Long House	August 11, 1982 (#82002803)	1401 Maple St. 31°55′37″N 92°37′38″W	Winnfield	
4	Phillips School	Phillips School	February 10, 2000 (#00000073)	Approximately ½ mile west of the junction of Louisiana Highway 421 and Harrisburg Rd. 31°45′10″N 92°46′02″W	Atlanta	
5	St. Maurice Methodist Church	St. Maurice Methodist Church	August 27, 1997 (#97000964)	Junction of U.S. Highway 71 and Louisiana Highway 477; 31°45′35″N 92°57′29″W	St. Maurice	Vertically oriented wood frame church with a central entrance tower
6	Sikes High School		November 26, 2025 (#100012340)	110 Second Street; 32°04′49″N 92°29′13″W	Sikes	

== Former listing ==
	Name on the Register	Image	Date listed	Date removed	Location	City or town	Description
1	Winnfield Hotel	Winnfield Hotel	June 11, 1980 (#80001775)	May 3, 2016	302 E. Main St. 31°55′34″N 92°38′13″W	Winnfield	Demolished in February 6, 1997.
2	St. Maurice Plantation		April 3, 1979 (#79001104)	January 31, 2019	Off Louisiana Highway 477; 31°45′22″N 92°57′54″W	St. Maurice	Destroyed by fire June 5, 1981

== See also ==
- List of National Historic Landmarks in Louisiana
- National Register of Historic Places listings in Louisiana
