= Long House =

Long House may refer to:

- Long house, a type of building

Places in the United States (by state)

- Web Long House and Motel, Hardy, Arkansas, listed on the NRHP in Sharp County, Arkansas
- Samuel C. Long House, Tempe, Arizona, listed on the NRHP in Maricopa County, Arizona
- Long-Waterman House, San Diego, California, listed on the NRHP in San Diego County, California
- Haskell-Long House, Middleburg, Florida
- Long House (Opa-Locka, Florida)
- Crawford W. Long Childhood Home, Danielsville, Georgia, listed on the NRHP in Madison County, Georgia
- Jerolaman-Long House, Logansport, Indiana, listed on the NRHP in Cass County, Indiana
- J.G. and Regina Long House, Monroe, Iowa, listed on the NRHP in Jasper County, Iowa
- Chester I. Long House, Wichita, Kansas, listed on the NRHP in Sedgwick County, Kansas
- Long-Briggs House, Russellville, Kentucky, listed on the NRHP in Logan County, Kentucky
- D. T. Long House, Scotts Station, Kentucky, listed on the NRHP in Shelby County, Kentucky
- Huey P. Long Mansion, New Orleans, Louisiana
- Huey P. Long House (Forest Ave., Shreveport, Louisiana)
- Huey P. Long House (Laurel St., Shreveport, Louisiana)
- George Parker Long House, Winnfield, Louisiana, listed on the NRHP in Winn Parish, Louisiana
- William Long Log House, Crestwood, Missouri, listed on the NRHP in St. Louis County, Missouri
- R.A. Long House, Kansas City, Missouri
- Long House (Kalispell, Montana), listed on the NRHP in Flathead County, Montana
- William H. Long Memorial, Hopkinton, New Hampshire, listed on the NRHP in Merrimack County, New Hampshire
- James A. and Laura Thompson Long House, Roxboro, North Carolina, listed on the NRHP in Person County, North Carolina
- Alexander Long House, Spencer, North Carolina, listed on the NRHP in Rowan County, North Carolina
- William H. Long House, Greenville, North Carolina, listed on the NRHP in Pitt County, North Carolina
- Long, McCorkle and Murray Houses, Newton, North Carolina, listed on the NRHP in Catawba County, North Carolina
- Long-Mueller House, Kettering, Ohio, listed on the NRHP in Montgomery County, Ohio
- Long-Romspert House, Oakwood, Ohio, listed on the NRHP in Montgomery County, Ohio
- A. G. Long House, Portland, Oregon
- Joiner-Long House, Cleburne, Texas, listed on the NRHP in Johnson County, Texas
