= Huey P. Long House =

Huey P. Long House may refer to:

- Huey P. Long Mansion, in New Orleans, listed on the NRHP in Orleans Parish, Louisiana
- Huey P. Long House (Forest Ave., Shreveport, Louisiana) at 305 Forest Ave., listed on the NRHP in Caddo Parish, Louisiana
- Huey P. Long House (Laurel St., Shreveport, Louisiana) at 2403 Laurel St., formerly listed on the NRHP in Caddo Parish, Louisiana
