= Socialist Party of Louisiana =

The Socialist Party of Louisiana was a political party in the U.S. state of Louisiana affiliated with the Socialist Party of America. The 1912 results reveal that the party's support was based in areas that had been strongholds of the Populist Party in the 1890s. Their areas of highest support were parishes with few large farms and lower farm values. Other important constituencies within the party were unskilled lumber workers and Marxian socialists, who were based in New Orleans.

In 1903, the party adopted a platform supporting racial segregation. After the party was criticized by the national committee, it was advised to focus on economic equality rather than racial issues.

The party was heavily divided between "Yellows" who advocated electoral action and "Reds" who were primarily affiliated with the Industrial Workers of the World and favored direct action.

The strength of the party was found in the rural uplands areas of the state, including Vernon Parish and Winn Parish in the north and west. For example, in the 1912 election, the entire slate of the Socialist Party was elected in Winnfield and 35.45% of votes in the parish seat went to Socialist presidential nominee Eugene V. Debs. Statewide in the 1912 presidential election, Eugene Debs outpolled Republican Party nominee and incumbent president William Howard Taft and received 5,429 votes. The party did not do as well in areas along the Mississippi River Delta, nor in New Orleans, which Debs received only 2.1% of the vote and the party's mayoral candidate received only 700 votes.
