= KNSN =

KNSN may refer to:

- KNSN (AM), a radio station (1240 AM) licensed to San Diego, California, United States
- KNSN-TV, a television station (channel 20/PSIP 21) licensed to Reno, Nevada, United States
- KLNQ, a radio station (106.5 FM) licensed to Atlanta, Louisiana, United States, which held the call sign KNSN from 2001 to 2002
- KXRX, a radio station (97.1 FM) licensed to Walla Walla, Washington, United States, which held the call sign KNSN from 1989 to 1994
