= Brister School House =

- U.S. National Register of Historic Places
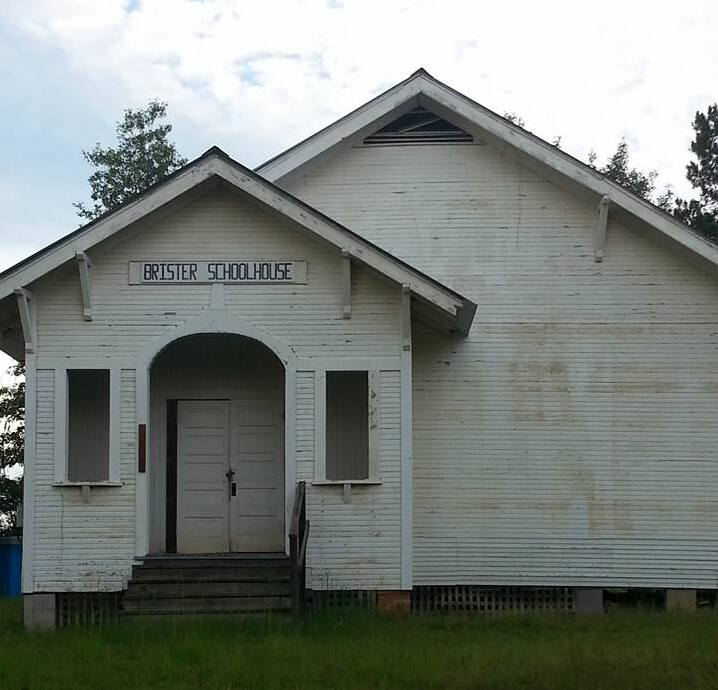

- Location within Louisiana
- Nearest city: Sikes, Louisiana
- Coordinates: 32°00′01″N 92°27′34″W
- Area: 1 acre (0.40 ha)
- Built: c.1915
- Architectural style: Bungalow/craftsman
- NRHP reference No.: 01000808
- Added to NRHP: August 2, 2001

The Brister School House, in Winn Parish, Louisiana near Sikes, Louisiana, was built around 1915. It was listed on the National Register of Historic Places in 2001.

It is a one-room schoolhouse built with aspects of Craftsman style.

It is located at Parish Road 240 and Brister School Rd.
