= St. Maurice Methodist Church =

Historic church in Louisiana, United States

- U.S. National Register of Historic Places
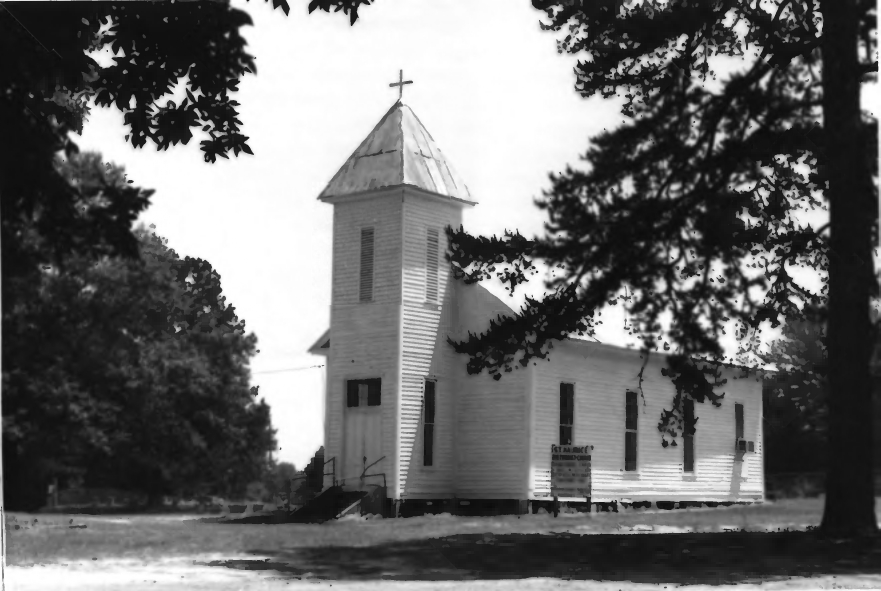

- Location within Louisiana Location within the United States
- Location: Jct. of LA 477 and LA 71, St. Maurice, Louisiana
- Coordinates: 31.759824°N 92.958118°W
- Area: 7.5 acres (3.0 ha)
- Built: 1874
- Built by: John E. Jones
- NRHP reference No.: 97000964
- Added to NRHP: August 27, 1997

St. Maurice Methodist Church is a historic Methodist church (building) at the junction of LA 477 and U.S. Highway 71 in St. Maurice in Winn Parish, Louisiana, across from the U.S. post office of St. Maurice. It was built in 1874 and added to the National Register in 1997.

It has a central entrance tower with a pyramidal roof topped by a cross. The tower and the main block of the church are covered with weatherboard held by square nails. It has a tin roof, which was originally of shake construction.
