= Calcasieu =

Calcasieu may refer to several things, all located in the U.S. state of Louisiana:

- Calcasieu, Louisiana, an unincorporated community
- Calcasieu Parish, Louisiana, a civil parish
- Calcasieu Lake, a lake in Cameron Parish
- Calcasieu River, a river
