= St. Maurice Plantation =

Historic house in Louisiana, United States

- Formerly listed on the U.S. National Register of Historic Places
- Location within Louisiana Location within the United States
- Location: Off LA 477, St. Maurice, Louisiana
- Coordinates: 31°45′22″N 92°57′54″W
- Area: 1 acre (0.40 ha)
- Built: 1845
- Architectural style: Greek Revival
- NRHP reference No.: 79001104

Significant dates
- Added to NRHP: April 3, 1979
- Removed from NRHP: January 31, 2019

St. Maurice Plantation was a historic mansion on a plantation off the banks of the Red River of the South in Winn Parish, Louisiana, USA.

== History ==
The house was built for the Prothro family, and it was completed in 1845. It was designed in the Greek Revival architectural style. By 1850, members of the Prothro family and their African slaves died of the yellow fever. A decade later, during the American Civil War of 1861–1865, the plantation was taken over by the Union Army.

It has been listed on the National Register of Historic Places since April 3, 1979. It was destroyed by fire on June 5, 1981. It was removed from the National Register in January 2019.
