= Phillips School (Atlanta, Louisiana) =

- U.S. National Register of Historic Places
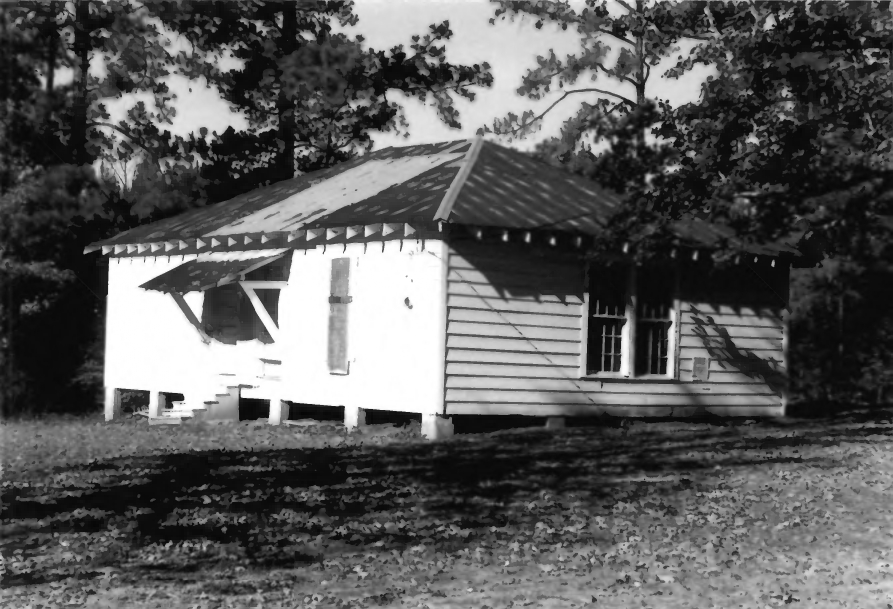

- Location within Louisiana
- Nearest city: Atlanta, Louisiana
- Coordinates: 31°45′10″N 92°46′02″W
- Area: 2 acres (0.81 ha)
- Built: 1918
- NRHP reference No.: 00000073
- Added to NRHP: February 10, 2000

The Phillips School in Winn Parish, Louisiana, near Atlanta, Louisiana, was built in 1918. It was listed on the National Register of Historic Places in 2000.

It is a one-room schoolhouse built in 1918 using parts salvaged from a nearby old building. It is a 41 by 30 feet (12.5 m × 9.1 m) wood-frame building with a hipped roof. It is supported by low piers made of concrete or brick, and is covered by weatherboard siding.

It was founded and operated as a public-private type partnership to serve African-American children who could not afford private schools, and there were no public schools for them.

According to its NRHP nomination, one student, Dessarine Phillips Smith, who attended from 1933 to 1934, stated that "The school made quite a bit of difference [in her life]. The teacher was very well educated and very creative. She taught us how to make do - to make things out of nothing." It educated about 1,850 persons from 1918 up to 1955, when it closed.

It is located about .5 miles (0.80 km) west of the junction of Louisiana Highway 421 and Harrisburg Rd.
