= Whitehall, Louisiana =

Whitehall, Louisiana may refer to:

- Whitehall, La Salle Parish, Louisiana
- Whitehall, Livingston Parish, Louisiana
