= Moncla, Louisiana =

Unincorporated community in Louisiana, United States

Moncla
- Unincorporated community
- Location of Moncla in Louisiana
- Coordinates: 31°12′16″N 92°07′08″W
- Country: United States
- State: Louisiana
- Parish: Avoyelles
- Incorporated: 1955

Area
  - Total: 0.8 sq mi (2.1 km^{2})
  - Land: 0.8 sq mi (2.1 km^{2})
  - Water: 0.0 sq mi (0 km^{2})
- Elevation: 79 ft (24 m)

Population (2000)
  - Total: 642
  - Density: 800/sq mi (310/km^{2})
- Time zone: UTC-6 (CST)
  - Summer (DST): UTC-5 (CDT)
- Area code: 318
- GNIS feature ID: 545549

Moncla is an unincorporated community village in Avoyelles Parish, Louisiana, United States. The population was 642 at the 2000 census.

== History ==
The town was named for the family of Dr. Joseph Moncla, native of France and a practicing physician of 19th century Avoyelles Parish. Dr. Moncla died while out on a call seeing one of his patients. Several of Dr. Moncla's sons settled on his former plantation along Red River of the South. One was postmaster.

The area has never been incorporated. Moncla has been a favored point of river crossing of the Red River because of the Moncla Bluffs making passage possible in bad weather in the 1800s. A bridge, the third to serve the area, now spans the Red River at Moncla in Avoyelles Parish.

== Geography ==
According to the United States Census Bureau, the village has a total area of 1.9 km^{2} (0.8 mi^{2}), all land.

== Demographics ==
As of the census of 2000, there were 642 people, 280 households, and 176 families residing in the village. The population density was 330.5/km^{2} (855.1/mi^{2}). There were 303 housing units at an average density of 156.0/km^{2} (403.6/mi^{2}). The racial makeup of the village was 91.43% White, 6.70% African American, 1.56% Native American, and 0.31% from two or more races. Hispanic or Latino of any race were 0.16% of the population.

There were 280 households, out of which 27.9% had children under the age of 18 living with them, 50.7% were married couples living together, 8.6% had a female householder with no husband present, and 37.1% were non-families. 32.9% of all households were made up of individuals, and 14.6% had someone living alone who was 65 years of age or older. The average household size was 2.29 and the average family size was 2.90.

In the village the population was spread out, with 23.8% under the age of 18, 9.7% from 18 to 24, 30.2% from 25 to 44, 22.3% from 45 to 64, and 14.0% who were 65 years of age or older. The median age was 35 years. For every 100 females, there were 94.5 males. For every 100 females age 18 and over, there were 85.2 males.

The median income for a household in the village was $24,659, and the median income for a family was $31,528. Males had a median income of $23,750 versus $16,964 for females. The per capita income for the village was $12,449. About 15.3% of families and 18.6% of the population were below the poverty line, including 16.1% of those under age 18 and 20.0% of those age 65 or over.

== Education ==
Local public schools are managed by the Avoyelles Parish School Board.

== See also ==
- Brouillette, Louisiana
- Marksville, Louisiana (Parish Seat)
