= Negreet High School =

Location
- 4129 State Highway 476; Negreet, Louisiana 71460; United States; 31°28′12″N 93°34′27″W

Information
- School type: Public, High School
- Superintendent: Sara Ebarb
- Principal: Eylda G. Thaxton
- Grades: PK-12
- Gender: coed
- Enrollment: 422 (2023-2024)
- Campus type: Rural
- Colors: Red and black
- Team name: Indians
- Website: www.sabine.school/o/nhs

Negreet High School is a K-12 school in the unincorporated community of Negreet in Sabine Parish, Louisiana, United States. It is a part of the Sabine Parish School Board.

== History ==
In January 2014, the ACLU filed suit against the Sabine Parish School Board, Superintendent Sara Ebarb, Principal Gene Wright and teacher Rita Roark of Negreet High School, alleging officials at one of its schools harassed a sixth-grader because of his Buddhist faith and that the district routinely pushes Christian beliefs upon their students. In March 2014, the U.S. District Court approved a consent decree, a court order agreed to by both parties, requiring the Sabine Parish School Board to put an end to a variety of alleged unconstitutional practices at Negreet High School and other Sabine Parish Schools.

== Athletics ==
Negreet High athletics competes in the LHSAA.
