= Wheeling, Louisiana =

Coordinates: 31°44′47″N 92°50′22″W

Wheeling is an unincorporated community in Winn Parish, Louisiana.
