= Jordan Hill, Louisiana =

Jordan Hill
- Census-designated place
- Hamlet of Jordan Hill
- Location in Louisiana
- Coordinates: 31°51′50″N 92°30′15″W
- Country: United States
- States: Louisiana
- Parish: Winn

Area
  - Land: 6.71 sq mi (17.38 km^{2})
  - Water: 0 sq mi (0.00 km^{2})
- Elevation: 98 ft (30 m)

Population (2020)
  - Total: 196
  - Density: 29.2/sq mi (11.28/km^{2})
- FIPS code: 22-38845
- GNIS feature ID: 2586686

Jordan Hill is a census-designated place (CDP) in Winn Parish, Louisiana, United States.

As of the 2020 census, Jordan Hill had a population of 196.

== Demographics ==
Historical population
Census	Pop.	Note	%±
2010	211		—
2020	196		−7.1%
U.S. Decennial Census

Jorden Hill first appeared as a census designated place in the 2010 U.S. census. '
