= George Parker Long House =

Historic house in Louisiana, United States

- U.S. National Register of Historic Places
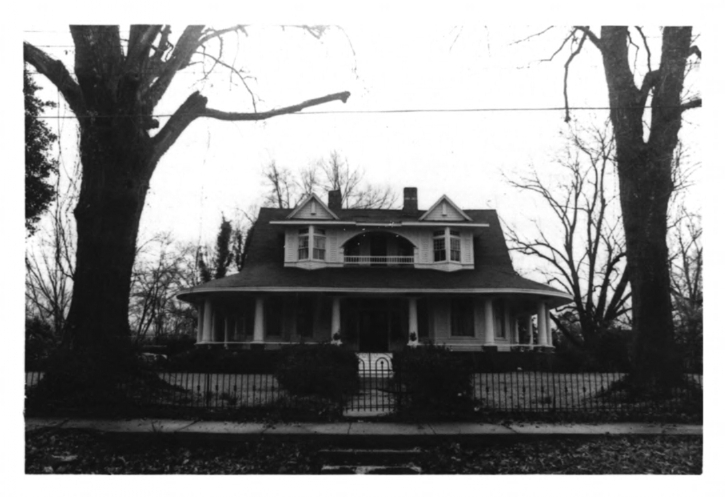

- Location within Louisiana Location within the United States
- Location: 1401 Maple St., Winnfield, Louisiana
- Coordinates: 31°55′37″N 92°37′38″W
- Area: 0.8 acres (0.32 ha)
- Built: 1905
- Architectural style: Colonial Revival, Queen Anne
- NRHP reference No.: 82002803
- Added to NRHP: August 11, 1982

The George Parker Long House is a historic house in Winnfield, Louisiana, U.S.. It was built in 1905, and designed in the Queen Anne architectural style. It has been listed on the National Register of Historic Places since August 11, 1982.

== History ==
George P. Long was born in Mississippi in 1849 and moved with his family to Winn Parish around 1859. By the 1880s he had established a general store in Winnfield; after several years he sold the business and turned to land and real-estate dealings, selling farms and handling much of the property within the town limits. According to the parish tax rolls for 1900, Long held about 2,300 acres and at one time owned or controlled 48 dwellings in Winnfield.

Long was also active in banking. He was a major stockholder in the Bank of Winnfield and Trust Company, served on its original board of directors, and was president of the institution from 1902 to 1907. He later assisted in organizing the Continental Bank and Trust Company in Shreveport. Long built the Maple Street residence about 1905 and lived there for the remainder of his life.

== Significance ==
The George Parker Long House was listed on the National Register of Historic Places as a locally important example of Queen Anne Revival domestic architecture in Winnfield. Features include a long curved gallery, a wide hall and an imperial staircase, the presence of two semi-octagonal bays and a turret, and an elaborate roofline with multiple gables, an arched balcony, and distinctive dormer bays.
