= Gum Springs Recreation Area =

- U.S. National Register of Historic Places
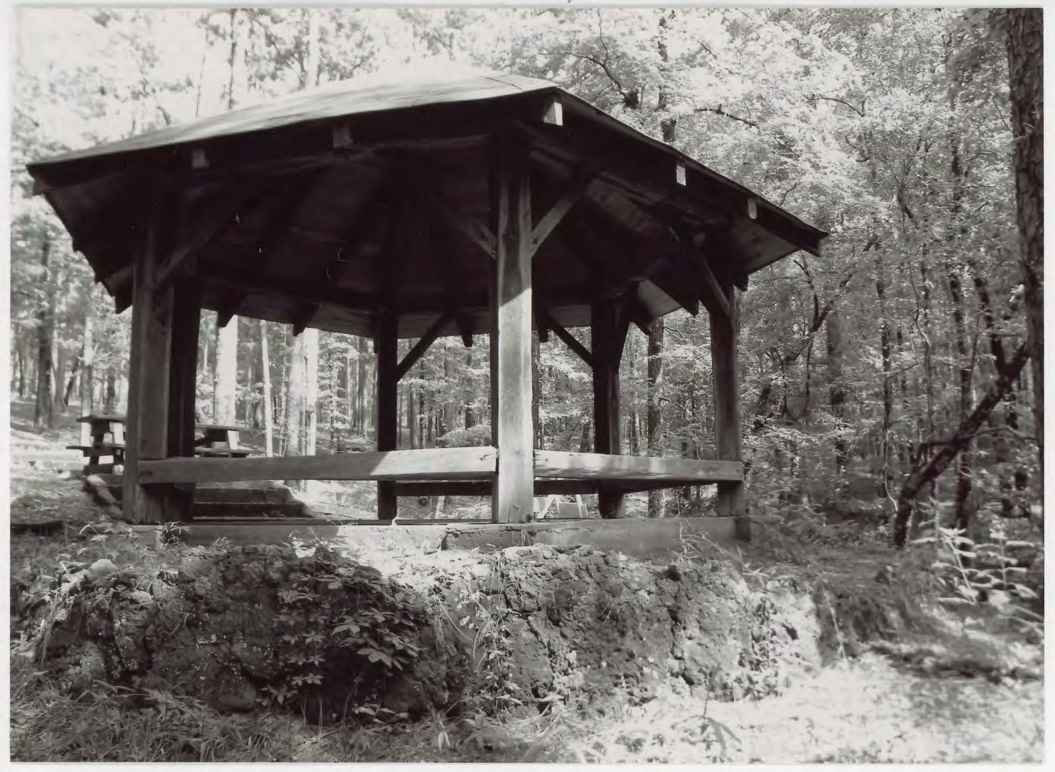
- Gum Springs Recreation Area in 2010 in Winn Parish, Louisiana

- Location within Louisiana
- Location: 12312 US 84 West, Kisatchie National Forest, near Winnfield, Winn Parish, Louisiana, United States
- Coordinates: 31°53′51″N 92°47′16″W
- Area: 10 acres (4.0 ha)
- Built: 1939
- Architect: Jackson, J. C.; Harris, Hugh K.; Galloway, C. Joe; Civilian Conservation Corps
- Architectural style: Rustic recreation landscape
- NRHP reference No.: 10000986
- Added to NRHP: December 7, 2010

Gum Springs Recreation Area is a historic public recreation site in the Kisatchie National Forest, near Winnfield in Winn Parish, Louisiana, United States. The site originated as a New Deal–era Civilian Conservation Corps project that developed a spring-fed swimming pool and associated picnic facilities for public use under the United States Forest Service. It occupies about 10 acres within an east-facing natural drainage basin fed by multiple springs and is characterized by steep wooded slopes, terraced hillsides, and a former swimming pool impounded by an earthen dam. The property was listed on the National Register of Historic Places in 2010 for its associations with public recreation and with the Civilian Conservation Corps in Louisiana.

== History ==
The springs at the site were already used informally for picnicking and camping by local residents when the United States Forest Service surveyed the area in the mid-1930s and proposed formal recreational development. In 1936 forest supervisor Philip H. Bryan recommended constructing a wading pool and picnic area at Gum Springs, noting its popularity and the lack of comparable public swimming facilities near Winnfield. Plans prepared in 1936 and 1937 by landscape architects J. C. Jackson and Hugh K. Harris envisioned a swimming pool, parking area, picnic grounds, and trails arranged within the natural drainage basin.

Beginning in 1939, Company 5407 of the Civilian Conservation Corps, based at Camp F-6 near Calvin, Louisiana, established a spike camp at Gum Springs to carry out construction under Forest Service supervision. Enrollees built an earthen dam across the eastern end of the basin to create a spring-fed pool, lined the shallow portions with concrete, installed stone masonry along the banks, carved a system of erosion-control terraces into the hillsides, and erected rustic shelters, stairways, walls, and paths using native ferruginous sandstone and cypress timbers. Work on the recreation area continued into the early 1940s, and the Forest Service opened the site for public use around 1940.

During the 1940s, 1950s, and 1960s, Gum Springs Recreation Area functioned as a heavily used regional swimming and picnic destination for residents of Winn Parish and neighboring parishes, drawing visitors from rural communities with limited access to developed public swimming facilities. Contemporary accounts reported hundreds of automobiles and an estimated 2,200 visitors at the pool during a single Independence Day weekend in the mid-1960s. In response to growing use and changing expectations for public recreation sites, the Forest Service undertook a program of improvements between 1957 and 1960 as part of its Operation Outdoors initiative, which added new concrete picnic tables and benches, rebuilt bathhouses with concrete-block construction, resurfaced the pool bottom, applied wooden facing to pool walls, extended artificial beach areas, and expanded and paved stairways and walks.

Water quality in the spring-fed pool was a recurring concern, and state and local health officials inspected the facility several times beginning in the 1940s. In August 1968 the Louisiana State Department of Health advised that the pool was unsuitable for public use because of reduced spring flow and elevated bacteriological contamination, and the Forest Service closed the pool that year. Local residents, the Winn Parish Police Jury, and other organizations petitioned during the 1970s for restoration of the swimming facilities, but no rehabilitation project was funded, and the pool structure and associated buildings gradually fell into disrepair.

In 2007 a contractor working on the construction of the adjacent Gum Springs Reservoir breached the historic earthen dam without prior approval, and the break was backfilled in 2009, diminishing the structural integrity of the original dam although the pool basin and surrounding landscape features remained legible. The National Park Service accepted the nomination of Gum Springs Recreation Area to the National Register of Historic Places in December 2010, assigning it reference number 10000986 under Criterion A for entertainment and recreation and for politics and government, with significant years identified as 1939, 1957, and 1968.

== Significance ==
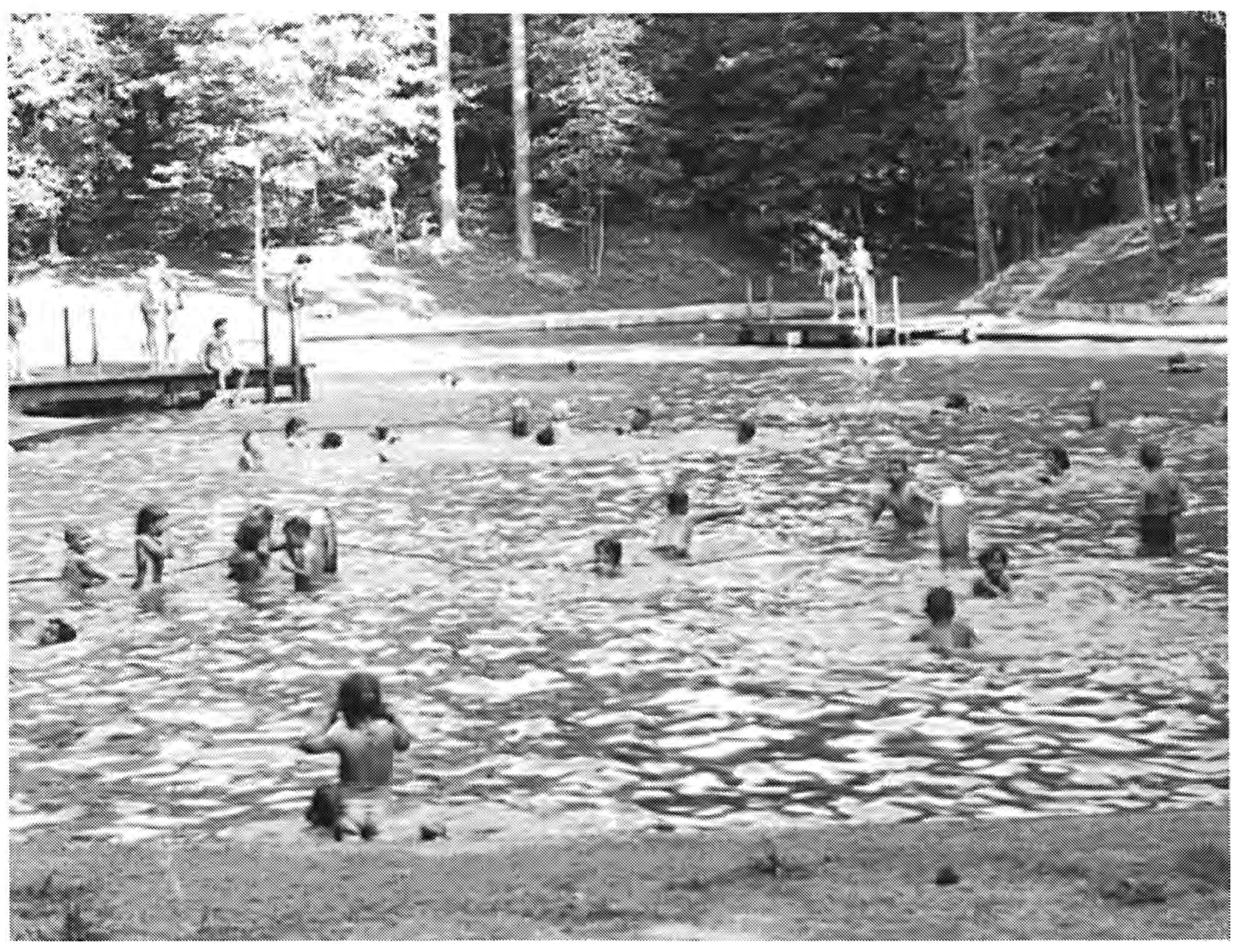
Gum Springs Rswimming area.

Gum Springs Recreation Area is located along U.S. Highway 84 west of Winnfield, where a short entrance road leads south from the highway into a wooded basin within Kisatchie National Forest. The site lies in an area of hilly terrain and natural springs and forms part of the broader Gum Springs Recreation Complex, which today provides basic opportunities for camping and picnicking. The National Register boundary encompasses approximately 10 acres of the drainage basin and surrounding slopes, defined by ridge-top roads on three sides and a line east of the dam that encloses the historic features.

The landscape consists of the irregularly shaped swimming pool, created by impounding spring water behind an earthen dam at the eastern end of the basin and lined with concrete in its shallow arms and a mixture of concrete and sand in deeper sections. Although now partly filled with wetland vegetation and scattered debris, the pool margins, masonry edging, and remnants of wooden wall facing and diving platforms remain visible and convey the form of the former swimming facility. Above the pool, nine hand-excavated erosion-control terraces follow the contours of the surrounding slopes, providing both pedestrian circulation and channels for controlled runoff, with clay and gravel surfacing to withstand heavy use in the easily eroded soils.

Contributing features within the district include two open hexagonal picnic shelters with cypress post-and-beam framing and tongue-and-groove roof decking, stone and concrete stairways and walks from multiple construction periods, ferruginous sandstone retaining walls supporting picnic knoll.
