= 1912 United States presidential election in Louisiana =

- November 5, 1912

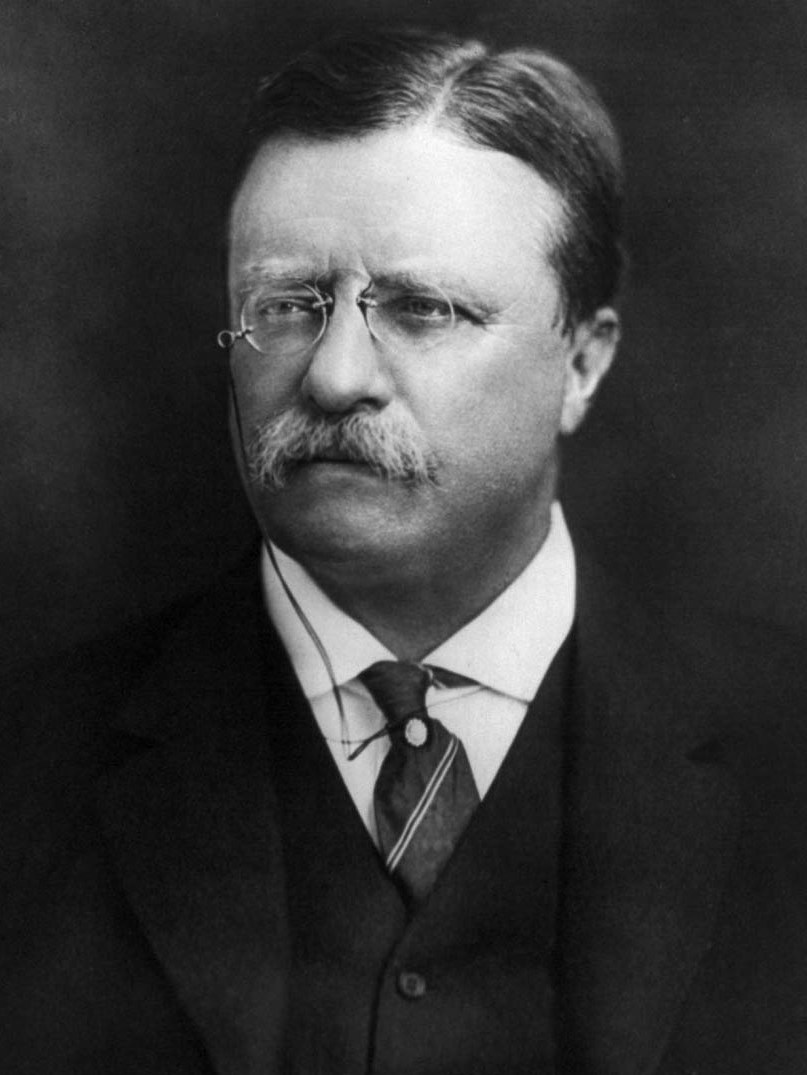

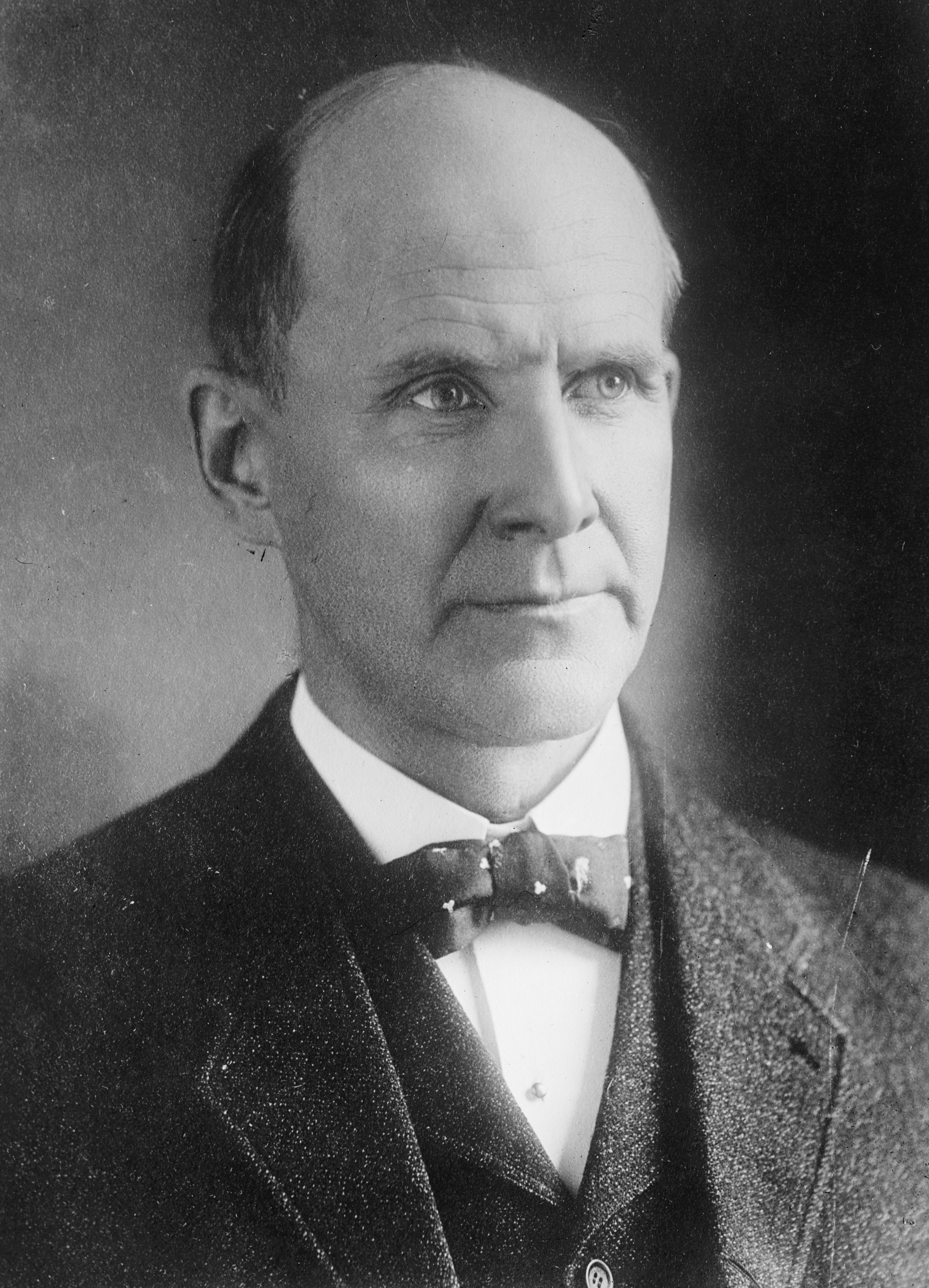
Nominee	Woodrow Wilson	Theodore Roosevelt	Eugene V. Debs
Party	Democratic	Progressive	Socialist
Home state	New Jersey	New York	Indiana
Running mate	Thomas R. Marshall	Hiram Johnson	Emil Seidel
Electoral vote	10	0	0
Popular vote	60,871	9,283	5,261
Percentage	76.81%	11.71%	6.64%
Parish results
Wilson
50–60%
60–70%
70–80%
80–90%
90–100%
President before election
William Howard Taft
Republican
Elected President
Woodrow Wilson
Democratic

The 1912 United States presidential election in Louisiana took place on November 5, 1912, as part of the 1912 United States presidential election. State voters chose ten representatives, or electors, to the Electoral College, who voted for president and vice president.

Following the passage of a new constitution in 1898, Louisiana became a one-party state dominated by the Democratic Party. The Republican Party became moribund due to the disenfranchisement of blacks and the complete absence of other support bases as Louisiana completely lacked upland or German refugee whites opposed to secession. Despite this absolute single-party dominance, non-partisan tendencies remained strong among wealthy sugar planters in Acadiana, within the business elite of New Orleans, and even amongst the “lily-white” faction of the moribund state GOP that had supported black disenfranchisement in the effort to become respectable amongst the white elite.

Following disfranchisement, the state's politics became dominated by the Choctaw Club of Louisiana, generally called the “Old Regulars”. This political machine was based in New Orleans and united with Black Belt cotton planters. The first significant opposition would not emerge until 1908, when the Socialist Party elected several officials in Winn Parish, and this would be joined in the early 1910s by the growth of the Industrial Workers of the World in the lumbering parishes of Imperial Calcasieu.

Louisiana was won by Princeton University President Woodrow Wilson (D–Virginia), running with governor of Indiana Thomas R. Marshall, with 76.81% of the popular vote, against the 26th president of the United States Theodore Roosevelt (P–New York), running with governor of California Hiram Johnson, with 11.71% of the popular vote and the five-time candidate of the Socialist Party of America for President of the United States Eugene V. Debs (S–Indiana), running with the first Socialist mayor of a major city in the United States Emil Seidel, with 13.33% of the popular vote.

Louisiana was one of the states where the sitting president William Howard Taft came in fourth place. Debs would take advantage of the growth of the Socialist Party in the hill country and Imperial Calcasieu to gain over twenty percent of the vote in five parishes, with Winn Parish — the home of Louisiana's future Long dynasty — being his third-best county-equivalent in the nation, although this radical opposition would become mortally weakened almost immediately afterwards by the unresolved conflict between electoral and antipolitical strategies for reform. Louisiana and neighboring Mississippi were the only two states that voted more Republican than they did in 1908.

== Results ==
1912 United States presidential election in Louisiana
Party	Candidate	Votes	%
Democratic	Woodrow Wilson	60,871	76.81%
Progressive	Theodore Roosevelt	9,283	11.71%
Socialist	Eugene V. Debs	5,261	6.64%
Republican	William Howard Taft (incumbent)	3,833	4.84%
Total votes		79,248	100%

=== Results by parish ===
Parish	Woodrow Wilson Democratic		Theodore Roosevelt Progressive		Eugene V. Debs Socialist		William Howard Taft Republican		Margin		Total votes cast
Parish	#	%	#	%	#	%	#	%	#	%	Total votes cast
Acadia	1,147	75.07%	164	10.73%	166	10.86%	51	3.34%	981 (Note: In this parish where Debs finished second ahead of Roosevelt, margin given is Wilson vote minus Debs vote and percentage margin Wilson percentage minus Debs percentage.)	64.20%	1,528
Ascension	413	66.19%	135	21.63%	12	1.92%	64	10.26%	278	44.55%	624
Assumption	423	56.85%	171	22.98%	1	0.13%	149	20.03%	252	33.87%	744
Avoyelles	949	83.32%	36	3.16%	116	10.18%	38	3.34%	833	73.13%	1,139
Bienville	822	81.79%	34	3.38%	141	14.03%	8	0.80%	681	67.76%	1,005
Bossier	427	87.68%	11	2.26%	43	8.83%	6	1.23%	384	78.85%	487
Caddo	1,946	88.45%	129	5.86%	91	4.14%	34	1.55%	1,817	82.59%	2,200
Calcasieu	2,144	66.05%	362	11.15%	569	17.53%	171	5.27%	1,575	48.52%	3,246
Caldwell	366	72.62%	20	3.97%	100	19.84%	18	3.57%	266	52.78%	504
Cameron	119	84.40%	9	6.38%	0	0.00%	13	9.22%	106 (Note: In this parish where Taft did finish second ahead of Roosevelt, margin given is Wilson vote minus Teft vote and percentage margin Wilson percentage minus Taft percentage.)	75.18%	141
Catahoula	275	73.92%	44	11.83%	42	11.29%	11	2.96%	231	62.10%	372
Claiborne	785	92.24%	20	2.35%	36	4.23%	10	1.18%	749	88.01%	851
Concordia	205	91.11%	6	2.67%	8	3.56%	6	2.67%	197	87.56%	225
DeSoto	815	88.68%	19	2.07%	74	8.05%	11	1.20%	741	80.63%	919
East Baton Rouge	1,067	85.43%	96	7.69%	41	3.28%	45	3.60%	971	77.74%	1,249
East Carroll	161	86.10%	19	10.16%	3	1.60%	4	2.14%	142	75.94%	187
East Feliciana	422	95.91%	12	2.73%	5	1.14%	1	0.23%	410	93.18%	440
Evangeline	457	83.70%	15	2.75%	43	7.88%	31	5.68%	414	75.82%	546
Franklin	449	76.88%	39	6.68%	88	15.07%	8	1.37%	361	61.82%	584
Grant	446	62.20%	48	6.69%	208	29.01%	15	2.09%	238	33.19%	717
Iberia	666	51.39%	350	27.01%	58	4.48%	222	17.13%	316	24.38%	1,296
Iberville	487	66.08%	147	19.95%	3	0.41%	100	13.57%	340	46.13%	737
Jackson	561	73.14%	80	10.43%	107	13.95%	19	2.48%	454	59.19%	767
Jefferson	607	82.25%	97	13.14%	27	3.66%	7	0.95%	510	69.11%	738
Lafayette	646	63.40%	53	5.20%	76	7.46%	244	23.95%	402	39.45%	1,019
Lafourche	667	56.96%	175	14.94%	14	1.20%	315	26.90%	352	30.06%	1,171
LaSalle	366	65.95%	31	5.59%	151	27.21%	7	1.26%	215	38.74%	555
Lincoln	644	84.51%	42	5.51%	73	9.58%	3	0.39%	571	74.93%	762
Livingston	379	80.13%	67	14.16%	24	5.07%	3	0.63%	312	65.96%	473
Madison	146	95.42%	7	4.58%	0	0.00%	0	0.00%	139	90.85%	153
Morehouse	411	89.15%	9	1.95%	33	7.16%	8	1.74%	378	82.00%	461
Natchitoches	759	75.07%	43	4.25%	188	18.60%	21	2.08%	571	56.48%	1,011
Orleans	26,433	80.03%	4,965	15.03%	727	2.20%	904	2.74%	21,468	65.00%	33,029
Ouachita	902	83.91%	48	4.47%	108	10.05%	17	1.58%	794	73.86%	1,075
Plaquemines	361	82.80%	29	6.65%	5	1.15%	41	9.40%	320	73.39%	436
Pointe Coupee	304	66.81%	90	19.78%	6	1.32%	55	12.09%	214	47.03%	455
Rapides	1,334	79.78%	110	6.58%	182	10.89%	46	2.75%	1,152	68.90%	1,672
Red River	357	76.61%	18	3.86%	85	18.24%	6	1.29%	272	58.37%	466
Richland	393	89.93%	20	4.58%	22	5.03%	2	0.46%	371	84.90%	437
Sabine	715	79.89%	37	4.13%	115	12.85%	28	3.13%	600	67.04%	895
St. Bernard	221	88.40%	11	4.40%	1	0.40%	17	6.80%	204	81.60%	250
St. Charles	157	74.76%	9	4.29%	16	7.62%	28	13.33%	129	61.43%	210
St. Helena	214	88.80%	10	4.15%	4	1.66%	13	5.39%	201	83.40%	241
St. James	367	54.05%	77	11.34%	7	1.03%	228	33.58%	139	20.47%	679
St. John the Baptist	190	61.29%	8	2.58%	38	12.26%	74	23.87%	116	37.42%	310
St. Landry	938	77.20%	150	12.35%	26	2.14%	101	8.31%	788	64.86%	1,215
St. Martin	375	64.43%	116	19.93%	23	3.95%	68	11.68%	259	44.50%	582
St. Mary	652	61.63%	242	22.87%	17	1.61%	147	13.89%	410	38.75%	1,058
St. Tammany	668	82.27%	70	8.62%	44	5.42%	30	3.69%	598	73.65%	812
Tangipahoa	1,061	80.02%	155	11.69%	70	5.28%	40	3.02%	906	68.33%	1,326
Tensas	220	91.67%	19	7.92%	0	0.00%	1	0.42%	201	83.75%	240
Terrebonne	455	55.35%	247	30.05%	31	3.77%	89	10.83%	208	25.30%	822
Union	696	87.66%	26	3.27%	61	7.68%	11	1.39%	635	79.97%	794
Vermilion	531	59.66%	119	13.37%	116	13.03%	124	13.93%	407	45.73%	890
Vernon	754	59.09%	50	3.92%	428	33.54%	44	3.45%	326	25.55%	1,276
Washington	491	83.08%	46	7.78%	36	6.09%	18	3.05%	445	75.30%	591
Webster	696	83.96%	13	1.57%	111	13.39%	9	1.09%	585	70.57%	829
West Baton Rouge	170	83.33%	15	7.35%	0	0.00%	19	9.31%	151	74.02%	204
West Carroll	159	63.35%	14	5.58%	77	30.68%	1	0.40%	82	32.67%	251
West Feliciana	281	89.49%	30	9.55%	0	0.00%	3	0.96%	251	79.94%	314
Winn	600	57.75%	49	4.72%	364	35.03%	26	2.50%	236	22.71%	1,039
Totals	60,871	76.81%	9,283	11.71%	5,261	6.64%	3,833	4.84%	51,588	65.10%	79,248

== See also ==
- United States presidential elections in Louisiana
