= Negreet, Louisiana =

Negreet
- Unincorporated community
- Location of Negreet in Louisiana
- Coordinates: 31°28′10″N 93°34′30″W
- Country: United States
- State: Louisiana
- Parish: Sabine
- Elevation: 223 ft (68 m)
- Time zone: UTC-6 (CST)
  - Summer (DST): UTC-5 (CDT)
- ZIP code: 71460
- GNIS feature ID: 543513

Negreet is an unincorporated community in Sabine Parish, Louisiana, United States. It is located near the intersection of Louisiana Highway 191 and Louisiana Highway 476, just east of the Toledo Bend Reservoir.

== History ==
Negreet was founded in 1822 and families began settling in sizeable numbers as the completion of nearby Fort Jesup brought the once lawless "Neutral Strip" under control.

The community flourished with farms and plantations until the Civil War, which devastated the area and displaced many of its residents.

In January 2014, the ACLU filed suit against the Sabine Parish School Board, Superintendent Sara Erarb, Principal Gene Wright and teacher Rita Roark of Negreet High School, alleging officials at one of its schools harassed a sixth-grader because of his Buddhist faith and that the district routinely pushes Christian beliefs upon their students. In March 2014, the U.S. District Court ruled against the school board.

== Climate ==
This climatic region is typified by large seasonal temperature differences, with warm to hot (and often humid) summers and cold (sometimes severely cold) winters. According to the Köppen Climate Classification system, Negreet has a humid subtropical climate, abbreviated "Cfa" on climate maps.

== Education ==
Public schools in Sabine Parish are operated by the Sabine Parish School Board. The community of Negreet is zoned to Negreet High School (Grades PK-12).
