= Ajax, Louisiana =

Ajax
- Unincorporated community
- Location of Ajax in Louisiana Ajax (the United States) Ajax (North America)
- Coordinates: 31°52′36″N 93°23′24″W
- Country: United States
- State: Louisiana
- Parish: Natchitoches
- Elevation: 240 ft (73 m)
- Time zone: UTC-6 (Central (CST))
  - Summer (DST): UTC-5 (CDT)
- Area code: 318
- GNIS feature ID: 542914

Ajax is an unincorporated community in Natchitoches Parish, Louisiana, United States. It is located approximately 17 miles northwest of Natchitoches along Louisiana Highway 174.

The community is part of the Natchitoches Micropolitan Statistical Area.

== History ==
Ajax began as a logging town in the piney woods of northern Natchitoches Parish. At the time the practice was to establish a small community to support logging operations, until the surrounding area was fully logged, and then to move 10 miles or so and establish another one. After the logging operations ceased, these communities usually shrank significantly and were then settled by small farmers looking for affordable land. Prior to the late 19th Century, this area was deemed too densely covered with brush and forest to be worth much, and as a result, largely remains very rural to this day.

The community received its name after a naming committee was unable to come up with a suitable name. While they were discussing it, one of the men noticed a boiler plate with the name of Ajax Iron Works stamped on it (from one of the steam engines used to run a local sawmill apparently). He said, "Let's just call it Ajax". The iron plate still exists and is on display in the Ajax Community Center at the intersection of Highways 174 and 487.

At one time Ajax had its own Post Office and school, but with the regional consolidations of these services over the years, neither exists today. Ajax receives mail through the Marthaville Post Office, which is approximately 10 miles away. Students either go to the public schools at Marthaville or Natchitoches; or to one of several church-run private schools around the area (or are homeschooled).

Currently Ajax has a gas station, a vegetable stand, and a small sawmill at the intersection of Highway 174 and I-49, which constitute the only businesses currently operating there. A volunteer fire department, Masonic lodge, community center, and non-denominational community church round out the non-residential buildings in Ajax. There was previously a RV Park, but it closed down in 2020.

There are no officially defined limits to what constitute the community boundaries, but there are approximately two dozen residences within the several miles of Hwys 174 and 487 that are commonly considered to be part of Ajax. Population is estimated to be less than fifty.
