= J.G. and Regina Long House =

Historic house in Iowa, United States

- U.S. National Register of Historic Places
- The J.G. and Regina Long House in 2026

- Location within Iowa Location within the United States
- Location: 8628 S. 104th Ave. W. Prairie City, Iowa
- Coordinates: 41°33′06″N 93°11′55″W
- Area: 2 acres (0.81 ha)
- Architectural style: Italianate
- NRHP reference No.: 97000307
- Added to NRHP: April 14, 1997

The J.G. and Regina Long House, also known as Maple Grove Hill Farm, is a historic residence located south-east of Prairie City, Iowa, United States. It was originally situated in Jasper County, Iowa, just outside the city of Monroe; it was relocated in 2013 at the owner's wish. It was listed on the National Register of Historic Places in 1997.

== History ==
The earliest known owner of the land was Joseph Grayson "Joe" Long. A native of Greene County, Pennsylvania, he and his brother Jesse relocated to Jasper County, Iowa where they each bought extensive land holdings, which they then farmed. Joe had married Mary Bussey in Pennsylvania, but she died before he relocated to Iowa. He then married Regina Hiskey, who was a native of Richland County, Ohio and they had two sons. Mental illness plagued their family: Jesse committed suicide on his farm; Joe was institutionalized near the end of his life. Joe died on the estate in 1901, as did Regina in 1925. Their son Charles owned the farm from 1902 to 1934.

In 2012, the property came under a new owner who did not want to have the house; instead, it was sold off before being relocated in 2013. The new location, which is south-east of Prairie City, Iowa, allows the house to be situated on a site more similar to the historical rural farm it was built on. Before it moved, it was the oldest wood framed house in Jasper County. The Iowa State Historic Preservation Office assisted with the move. KHAK, a radio station in Iowa, has reported the house to be haunted by evil spirits due to its history.

== Design ==
The house was built in an Italianate style, and was originally situated just outside of the city limits of Monroe, Iowa. The two-story frame house follows an L-shaped plan. It features a double and triple bracketed cornice, and a two-story porch in the ell of the house. The home was included in the Illustrated Historical Atlas of the State of Iowa, written by Alfred Andreas in 1875. The house was listed on the National Register of Historic Places on April 14, 1997. According to local tradition, it was a stop on the Underground Railroad and features an underground tunnel connecting the house to a barn.

The house is officially called the J.G. and Regina Long House; however, its common name of Maple Grove Hill Farm comes from the original owners' decision to plant maple trees on the estate, which are not native to Iowa.
