= Whitehall, LaSalle Parish, Louisiana =

- Unincorporated community
- Location in Louisiana Location in the United States
- Coordinates: 31°37′28″N 92°2′30″W
- Country: United States
- State: Louisiana
- Parish: LaSalle
- Elevation: 92 ft (28 m)
- Time zone: UTC-6 (Central (EST))
  - Summer (DST): UTC-5 (EDT)
- GNIS feature ID: 556410

Whitehall is an unincorporated community located in LaSalle Parish, Louisiana, United States.

The community is at the intersection of U.S. 80, Louisiana Highway 8 and Louisiana Highway 460. The north end of Catahoula Lake lies four miles to the south.
