= KLNQ =

- Atlanta, Louisiana; United States
- Broadcast area: Natchitoches, Louisiana
- Frequency: 106.5 MHz

Programming
- Format: Christian contemporary
- Network: K-Love

Ownership
- Owner: Educational Media Foundation

History
- First air date: 2001
- Former call signs: KNSN (2001–2002); KCIJ (2002–2015)

Technical information
- Licensing authority: FCC
- Facility ID: 88686
- Class: C3
- ERP: 25,000 watts
- HAAT: 100 meters
- Transmitter coordinates: 31°48′29″N 92°48′22″W

Links
- Public license information: Public file; LMS
- Webcast: Listen Live
- Website: klove.com

KLNQ (106.5 FM) is a radio station broadcasting a Christian contemporary format as an affiliate of K-LOVE. Licensed to Atlanta, Louisiana, United States, the station serves Natchitoches and surrounding areas. The station is currently owned by Educational Media Foundation.

== History ==
This station originally was granted by the FCC as 971003MA in 1998 as a 6,000-watt station at its current location. It was granted the callsign KNSN as a 25,000-watt station in 2001 and played an Urban adult contemporary format. In 2002, the callsign was changed to KCIJ and its format was later changed to Classic Hits, then Hot Adult Contemporary until 2013 when its format changed back to Classic Hits. In 2015 its format changed to Country music, and in March 2015 it adopted its current Christian contemporary format. On March 20, 2015, North Face Broadcasting LLC closed on the swap of KCIJ to Educational Media Foundation for K222AO—Natchitoches, Louisiana plus $142,000.

=== 106 KCIJ ===
Station's logo from 2009 until February 4, 2013

In 2009, KCIJ began airing a Hot AC format. The station played music from the 1980s, 1990s and 2000s.
