= Kurthwood, Louisiana =

- Unincorporated community
- Hamlet of Kurthwood
- Location within Louisiana Location within the United States
- Coordinates: 31°20′15″N 93°09′57″W
- Country: United States
- State: Louisiana
- Parish: Vernon
- Elevation: 331 ft (101 m)
- Time zone: UTC-6 (Central (CST))
  - Summer (DST): UTC-5 (CDT)
- ZIP code: 71443
- Area code: 337
- GNIS feature ID: 547555

Kurthwood is an unincorporated community in Vernon Parish, Louisiana, United States. Its ZIP code is 71443.
