= Loyd, Louisiana =

- Unincorporated community
- Location within Louisiana Location within the United States
- Coordinates: 31°02′41″N 92°21′30″W
- Country: United States
- State: Louisiana
- Parish: Rapides
- Elevation: 72 ft (22 m)
- Time zone: UTC-6 (Central (CST))
  - Summer (DST): UTC-5 (CDT)
- Area code: 318
- GNIS feature ID: 551851

Loyd is an unincorporated community in Rapides Parish, Louisiana, United States.
