= Sikes, Louisiana =

- Village
- Village of Sikes
- Location of Sikes in Winn Parish, Louisiana.

- Location of Louisiana in the United States
- Coordinates: 32°04′57″N 92°29′35″W
- Country: United States
- State: Louisiana
- Parish: Winn

Area
  - Total: 1.56 sq mi (4.05 km^{2})
  - Land: 1.56 sq mi (4.05 km^{2})
  - Water: 0 sq mi (0.00 km^{2})
- Elevation: 151 ft (46 m)

Population (2020)
  - Total: 112
  - Density: 71.7/sq mi (27.67/km^{2})
- Time zone: UTC-6 (CST)
  - Summer (DST): UTC-5 (CDT)
- Area code: 318
- FIPS code: 22-70385
- GNIS feature ID: 2407546

Sikes is a village in Winn Parish, Louisiana, United States. As of the 2020 census, Sikes had a population of 112.

The village was named after Sikes Bowman, (1856–1925), a leader in the Winn Parish Baptist church, musician, and the first postmaster in the local area.

== Geography ==
According to the United States Census Bureau, the village has a total area of 1.6 square miles (4.2 km^{2}), all land.

== Demographics ==
Historical population
Census	Pop.	Note	%±
1950	342		—
1960	233		−31.9%
1970	237		1.7%
1980	226		−4.6%
1990	120		−46.9%
2000	120		0.0%
2010	119		−0.8%
2020	112		−5.9%
2025 (est.)	125	▲	11.6%
U.S. Decennial Census

At the 2000 census, there were 121 people, 50 households and 34 families residing in the village. The population density was 76.6 inhabitants per square mile (29.6/km^{2}). There were 64 housing units at an average density of 40.8 per square mile (15.8/km^{2}). The racial makeup of the village was 97.50% White, and 2.5% Native American.

There were 50 households, of which 32.0% had children under the age of 18 living with them, 50.0% were married couples living together, 10.0% had a female householder with no husband present, and 32.0% were non-families. 30.0% of all households were made up of individuals, and 12.0% had someone living alone who was 65 years of age or older. The average household size was 2.40 and the average family size was 2.85.

25.0% of the population were under the age of 18, 7.5% from 18 to 24, 32.5% from 25 to 44, 24.2% from 45 to 64, and 10.8% who were 65 years of age or older. The median age was 39 years. For every 100 females, there were 93.5 males. For every 100 females age 18 and over, there were 91.5 males.

The median household income was $27,000 and the median family income was $33,750. Males had a median income of $26,750 compared with $20,417 for females. The per capita income for the village was $12,755. There were 22.2% of families and 33.7% of the population living below the poverty line, including 58.3% of under eighteens and 41.7% of those over 64.

== Government and infrastructure ==
The U.S. Postal Service maintains the Sikes Post Office.

== Education ==
Students are within the Winn Parish School Board school district.

The Winn Parish Library maintains the Sikes Library Branch.
