= Huey P. Long Mansion =

Historic house in Louisiana, United States

- U.S. National Register of Historic Places
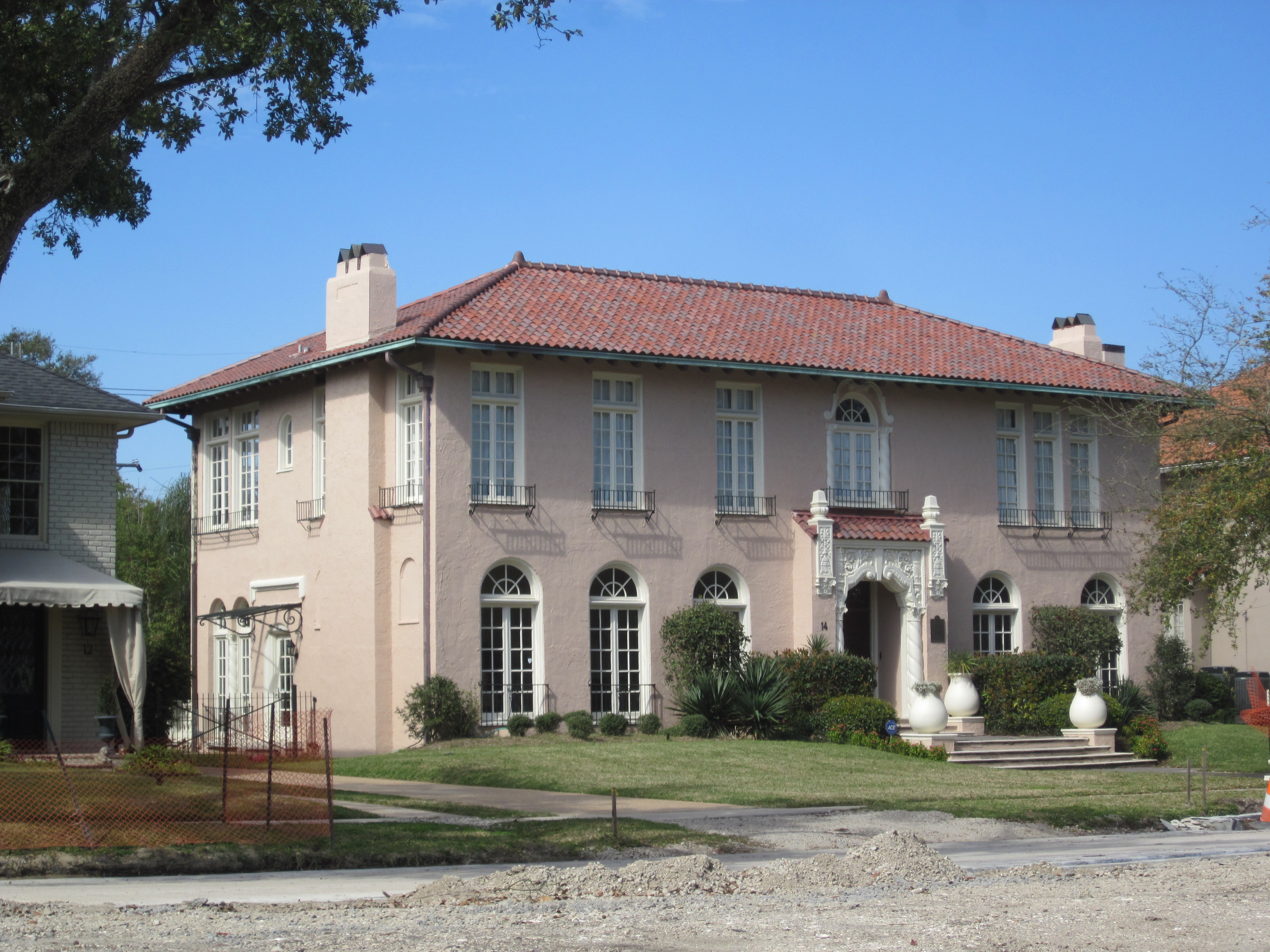

- Location within East New Orleans Location within Louisiana Location within the United States
- Location: 14 Audubon Blvd., New Orleans, Louisiana
- Coordinates: 29°56′34.9″N 90°7′11.8″W
- Built: c.1925
- Built by: Schwartz, Simon J., Jr.
- Architect: Weil, Benson & Bendernagel
- Architectural style: Late 19th And 20th Century Revivals
- NRHP reference No.: 80001744
- Added to NRHP: June 9, 1980

The Huey P. Long Mansion in New Orleans, Louisiana was listed on the National Register of Historic Places in 1980.

The 1920s Mediterranean Revival house is at 14 Audubon Boulevard, a short distance back from Willow Street and the Tulane University campus.

It was formerly owned by Louisiana Governor Huey P. Long, although Long only occasionally resided here. The house is still privately owned.

It is a pink stuccoed house built of concrete blocks. According to its NRHP nomination, its architecture "borrows from several

Mediterranean styles without being heavily in debt to any of them":

The crested broken pediments in the foyer, the scrolled brincaded entrance arch, and the red tile roof are attributable to the Spanish churrigueresque style. The groups of round arches set on Persian columns are attributable to the Byzantine style. The hooded classical style mantels in the front rooms are attributable to the Italian Renaissance. There are also bottle glass windows and heavily cut and paneled doors. The rear sunroom has a marble floor and arches which lead to the balustraded patio.

It was designed by architects Weil, Benson and Bendernagel, a firm asserted to be one of New Orleans' leading architectural firms of the 20th century, .

== See also ==
- Huey P. Long House (Forest Ave., Shreveport, Louisiana) at 305 Forest Ave., also listed on the National Register
- Huey P. Long House (Laurel St., Shreveport, Louisiana) at 2403 Laurel St., demolished, formerly listed on the National Register
