= Calcasieu, Louisiana =

Unincorporated community in Louisiana, U.S.

Coordinates: 31°05′23″N 92°42′42″W

Calcasieu is an unincorporated community in Rapides Parish, in the U.S. state of Louisiana.

== History ==
A post office called Calcasieu was established in 1925, and remained in operation until 1960. According to tradition, Calcasieu was named after an Atakapa chieftain.
