= Huey P. Long House (Laurel St., Shreveport, Louisiana) =

Historic house in Louisiana, United States

- Formerly listed on the U.S. National Register of Historic Places
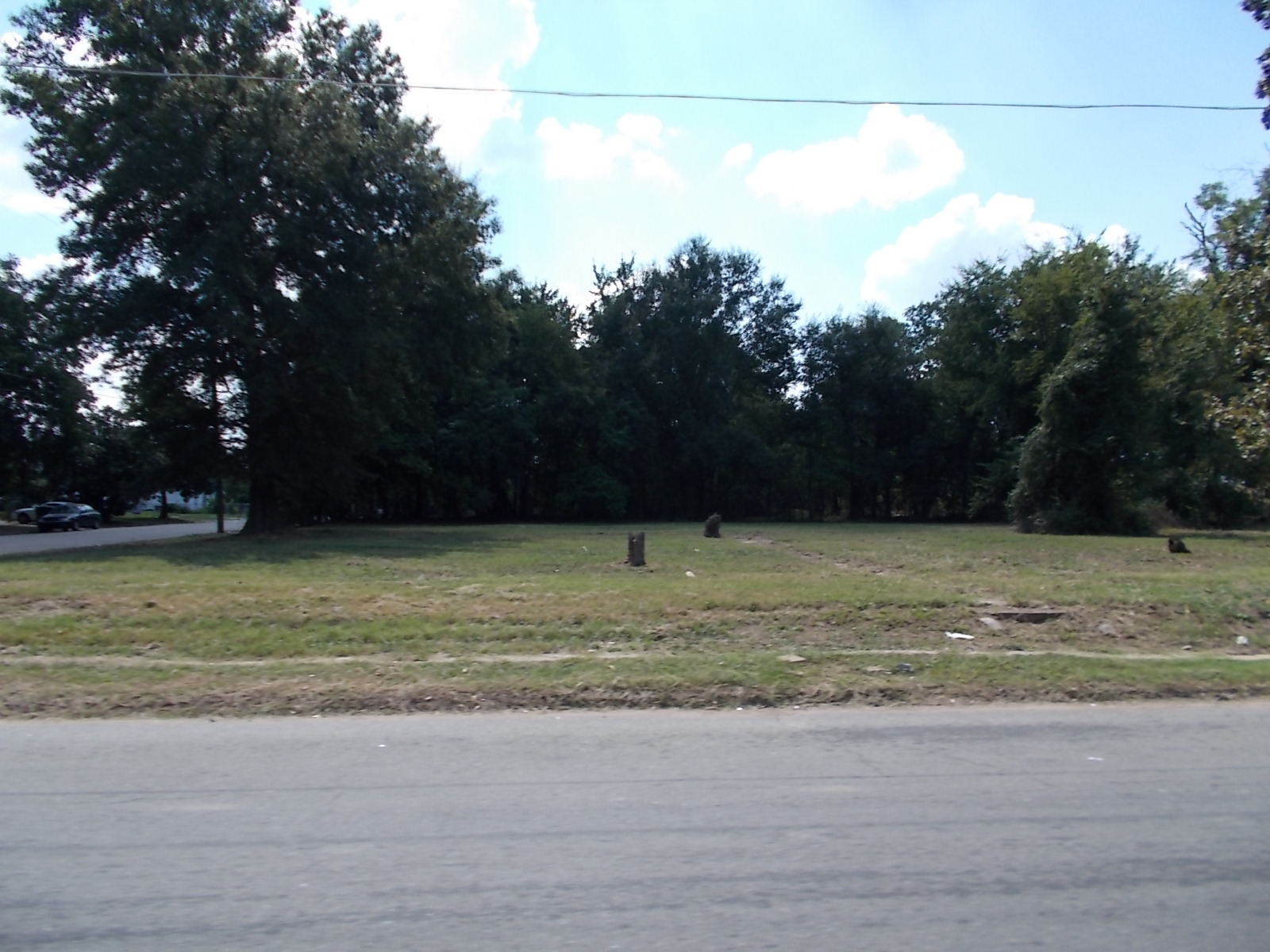

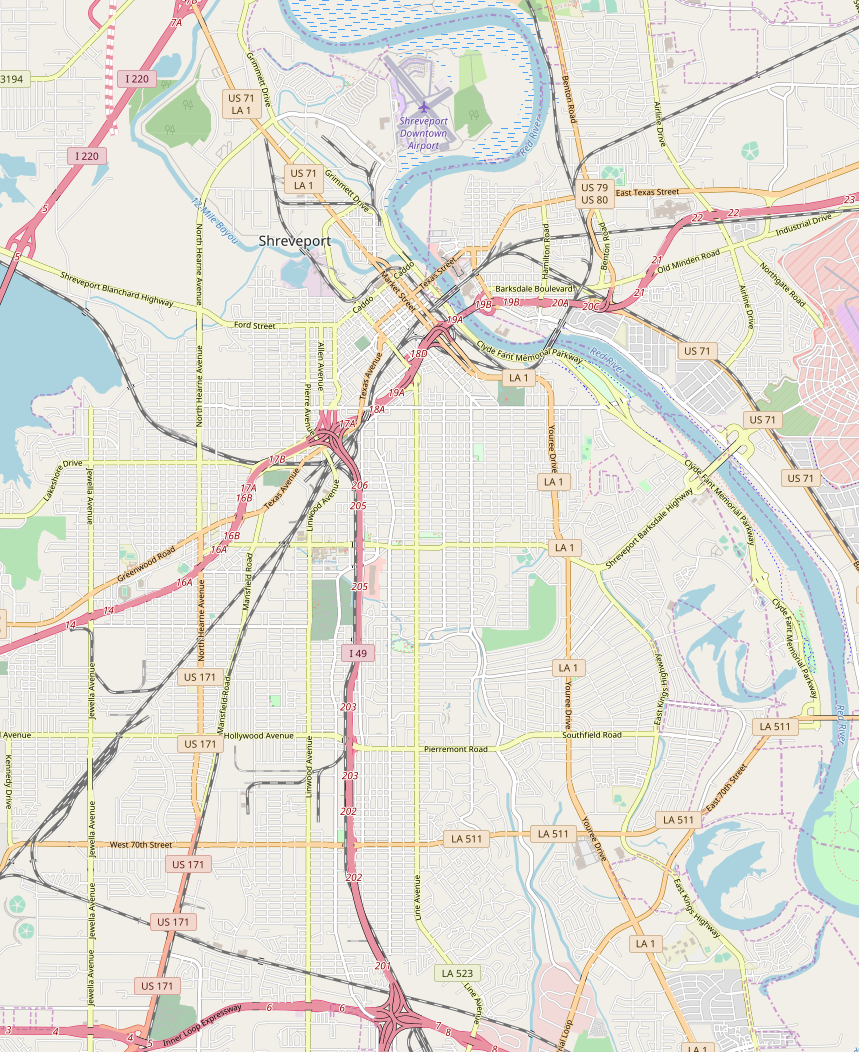
- Location within Shreveport
- Location: 2403 Laurel Street, Shreveport, Louisiana
- Coordinates: 32°29′43″N 93°46′36″W
- Area: less than ten acres
- Built: c. 1905
- Architectural style: Colonial Revival, Queen Anne
- Demolished: September 1992
- NRHP reference No.: 91000701

Significant dates
- Added to NRHP: June 10, 1991
- Removed from NRHP: May 2, 2016

Huey P. Long House was a historic house located at 2403 Laurel Street in Shreveport, Louisiana. It was built in c.1905. and was listed on the National Register of Historic Places in 1991.

The house was destroyed by fire in September 1992, and was delisted on May 2, 2016.

== Description and history ==
It was built around 1905 and was a modest one-story Queen Anne house with Colonial Revival columns. Huey Long and family moved into the house in 1918 and lived there until 1926. Additions to the house were made in 1924. It is significant for its association with the early career of Huey Long.

== See also ==
- Huey P. Long Mansion, in New Orleans, listed on the NRHP
- Huey P. Long House (Forest Ave., Shreveport, Louisiana) at 305 Forest Ave., listed on the NRHP
- National Register of Historic Places listings in Caddo Parish, Louisiana
