= Brouillette, Louisiana =

Unincorporated community in Avoyelles Parish, Louisiana, United States

Brouillette Norman
- unincorporated community
- Location within Louisiana Location within the United States
- Coordinates: 31°12′44.6682″N 92°1′17.4462″W
- Country: United States
- State: Louisiana
- Parish: Avoyelles
- Established: 1880
- Elevation: 56 ft (17 m)
- Time zone: UTC-6 (CST)
  - Summer (DST): UTC-5 (CDT)
- ZIP code: 71351
- Area code: 318

Brouillette is an unincorporated community in Avoyelles Parish, Louisiana, United States. The area is home to descendants of early French settlers, Native Americans, and Creoles.

== Red River ==
The Red River of the South along with Levee Road and Preston Road (LA HWY 452) are the primary thoroughfares serving the Brouillette community. The United States Army Corps of Engineers and Red River Waterway Commission operate lock and dams, boat ramps, fishing park, and the Brouillette Recreation Area.

== Education ==
Local public schools are managed by the Avoyelles Parish School Board.

== Religion ==
The area is served by the St. Genevieve Catholic Church of Brouillette, a historic Catholic Church founded in the 1800s. The current structure was built in the 1950s. Notable founding and patron families include Deville, Brevelle, Gaspard, Dupuy, Ponthier, Lacombe, Bordelon, Laborde, and Lachney, whose names appear prominently on the church's entrance, walls, and fencing. The parish church is part of the Diocese of Alexandria and includes an iconic cemetery with above-ground tombs.

== See also ==
- Marksville, Louisiana
- Effie, Louisiana
