= Huey P. Long House (Forest Ave., Shreveport, Louisiana) =

Historic house in Louisiana, United States

- U.S. National Register of Historic Places
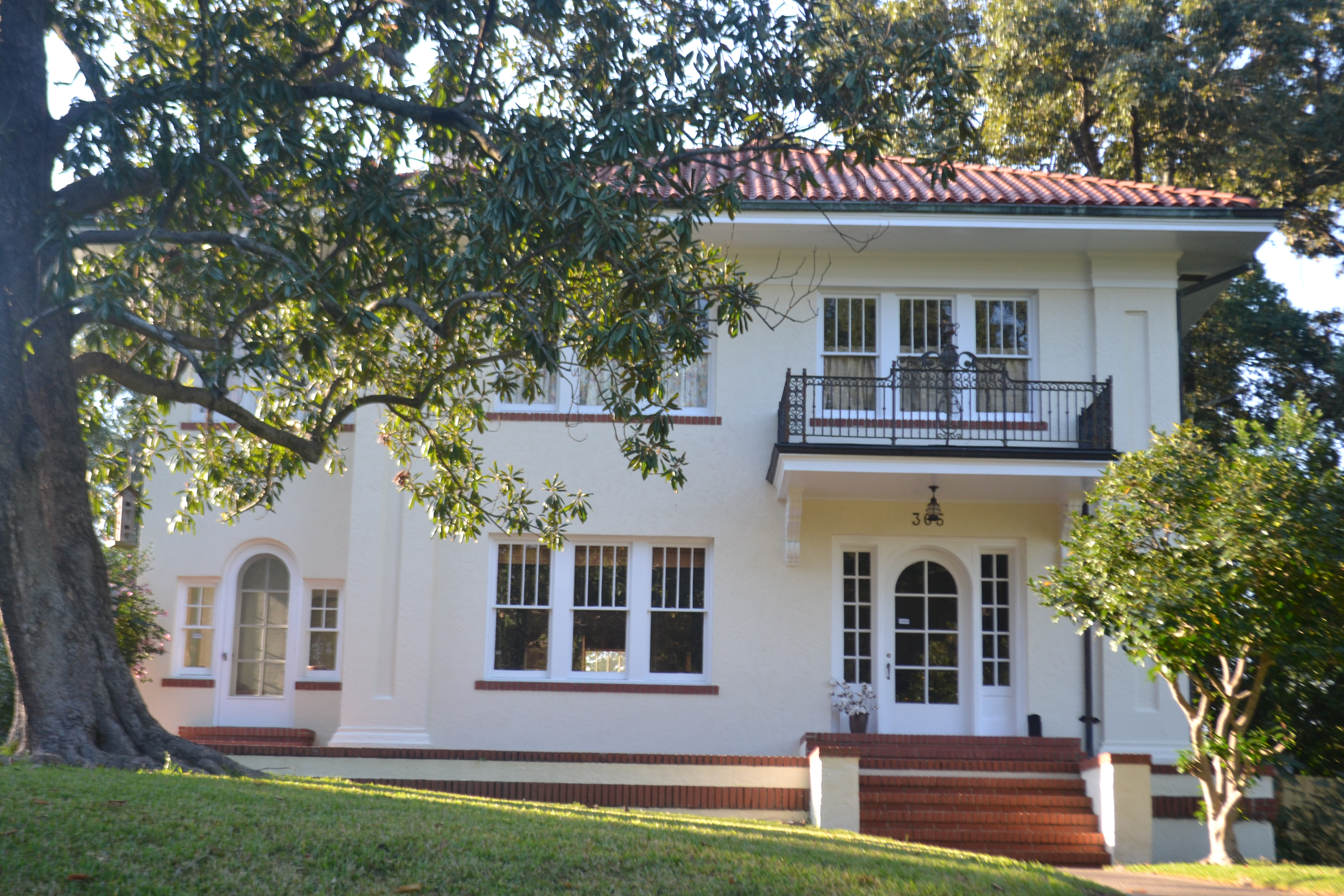

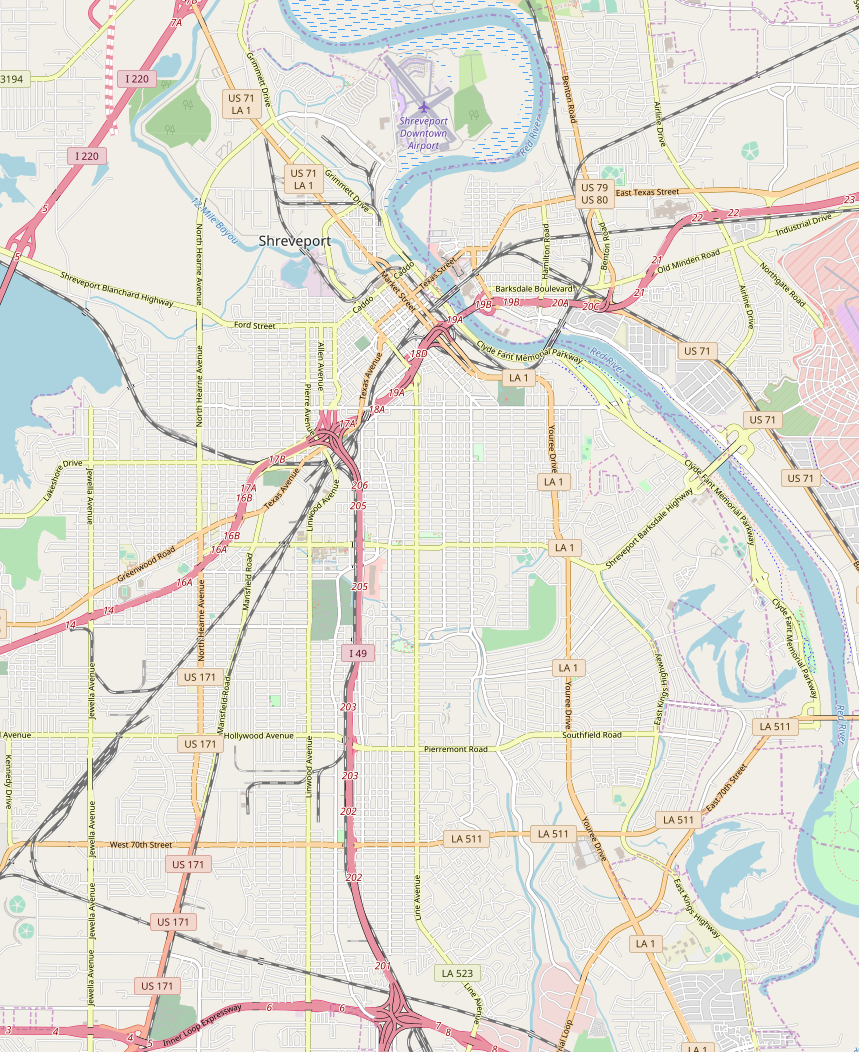
- Location within Shreveport
- Location: 305 Forest Avenue, Shreveport, Louisiana
- Coordinates: 32°28′47″N 93°44′11″W
- Area: less than one acre
- Built: 1926
- Built by: Gilman McConnell
- Architectural style: Mission/Spanish Revival
- NRHP reference No.: 91001060
- Added to NRHP: August 15, 1991

The Huey P. Long House on Forest Avenue in Shreveport, Louisiana was built in 1926. It was listed on the National Register of Historic Places (NRHP) in 1991.

It is a two-story Spanish Colonial Revival-style house made with stucco over hollow tile and roofed with Ludowici tile. It is significant for its association with politician Huey P. Long, who with his family moved into the house in 1926. He moved to Baton Rouge in 1928 when he became governor of the state, but the house remained in the family until the 1970s. It is the only house which Long had constructed for himself and in which he took much personal interest.

== See also ==
- Huey P. Long Mansion, in New Orleans, also NRHP-listed
- Huey P. Long House (Laurel St., Shreveport, Louisiana), destroyed, formerly NRHP-listed
- National Register of Historic Places listings in Caddo Parish, Louisiana
