= Atlanta, Louisiana =

- Village
- Village of Atlanta
- Location of Atlanta in Winn Parish, Louisiana

- Location of Louisiana in the United States
- Coordinates: 31°48′13″N 92°44′42″W
- Country: United States
- State: Louisiana
- Parish: Winn
- Incorporated: 1907

Area
  - Total: 1.08 sq mi (2.80 km^{2})
  - Land: 1.08 sq mi (2.80 km^{2})
  - Water: 0 sq mi (0.00 km^{2})
- Elevation: 230 ft (70 m)

Population (2020)
  - Total: 149
  - Density: 137.7/sq mi (53.16/km^{2})
- Time zone: UTC-6 (CST)
  - Summer (DST): UTC-5 (CDT)
- Area code: 318
- FIPS code: 22-03390
- GNIS feature ID: 2407412

Atlanta is a village in Winn Parish, Louisiana, United States. As of the 2020 census, Atlanta had a population of 149.

== History ==
The first settlement at Atlanta was made in the 1850s by pioneers from Georgia.

Atlanta was hit by two tornadoes exactly a year apart on December 8, 1916, and 1917. The first destroyed 35 homes and many smaller buildings. Two people were killed, and fifteen were injured. The second tornado was less destructive, destroying several churches, homes, and businesses. A child was killed, and two other people were injured. Both tornadoes were estimated at F2 intensity on the Fujita scale.

In 1938, a 5.5-kilogram (12 lb) stone fragment of a meteorite was found near Atlanta. It was sent to renowned American meteorite tracker Harvey H. Nininger. The discovery makes only three found in Louisiana.

On November 29, 2010, Atlanta was hit by an EF4 tornado. The tornado completely destroyed a large home and caused severe damage to several other homes. This was the second EF4 tornado to strike Louisiana in 2010. The Atlanta tornado was the 13th EF4 tornado of the year in the United States, the most since 1999.

== Geography ==
According to the United States Census Bureau, the village has a total area of 1.1 square miles (2.8 km^{2}), all land.

== Demographics ==
Historical population
Census	Pop.	Note	%±
1910	311		—
1970	197		—
1980	127		−35.5%
1990	118		−7.1%
2000	150		27.1%
2010	163		8.7%
2020	149		−8.6%
2025 (est.)	171	▲	14.8%
U.S. Decennial Census

As of the census of 2000, there were 150 people, 57 households, and 42 families residing in the village. The population density was 139.8 inhabitants per square mile (54.0/km^{2}). There were 80 housing units at an average density of 74.6 per square mile (28.8/km^{2}). The racial makeup of the village was 88.00% White, 10.00% African American and 2.00% Native American.

There were 57 households, out of which 45.6% had children under the age of 18 living with them, 54.4% were married couples living together, 12.3% had a female householder with no husband present, and 24.6% were non-families. 21.1% of all households were made up of individuals, and 7.0% had someone living alone who was 65 years of age or older. The average household size was 2.63 and the average family size was 3.07.

In the village, the population was spread out, with 26.0% under the age of 18, 10.7% from 18 to 24, 30.7% from 25 to 44, 23.3% from 45 to 64, and 9.3% who were 65 years of age or older. The median age was 32 years. For every 100 females, there were 94.8 males. For every 100 females age 18 and over, there were 94.7 males.

The median income for a household in the village was $26,875, and the median income for a family was $29,531. Males had a median income of $45,833 versus $25,000 for females. The per capita income for the village was $21,021. There were 15.4% of families and 15.1% of the population living below the poverty line, including 12.5% of under eighteens and none of those over 64.

== Government and infrastructure ==
The U.S. Postal Service maintains the Atlanta Post Office.

== Education ==
Students are within the Winn Parish School Board school district. Residents are assigned to schools in Winnfield: Winnfield Primary School, Winnfield Middle School, and Winnfield Senior High School.

Previously Atlanta High School, a PK-12 school, was the school in Atlanta. The Winn Parish school district board of trustees closed Atlanta High School in 2023. In June 2023 the board voted to keep the school open. However, in July 2023, the board voted to close the school. Six board members voted to close, while five voted to keep it open. The attendance boundary of the school was reassigned to campuses in Winfield. The closure took into effect right after the vote. Al Simmons, the superintendent, stated that the fact that the school had, of all of the district's schools, the smallest number of students, was a reason why the board closed the school.

The Winn Parish Library maintains the Atlanta Library Branch.

== Notable people ==
Louisiana industrialist and inventor William Edenborn maintained the Emden plantation southwest of Atlanta, where he grew peanuts, cotton, and silkworms.

== See also ==
- KLNQ
