= Saint Maurice, Louisiana =

- Census-designated place & Unincorporated community (CDP)
- Location within Louisiana Location within the United States
- Coordinates: 31°45′35″N 92°57′33″W
- Country: United States
- State: Louisiana
- Parish: Winn

Area
  - Total: 6.66 sq mi (17.26 km^{2})
  - Land: 6.66 sq mi (17.26 km^{2})
  - Water: 0 sq mi (0.00 km^{2})
- Elevation: 138 ft (42 m)

Population (2020)
  - Total: 266
  - Density: 39.9/sq mi (15.41/km^{2})
- Time zone: UTC-6 (Central (CST))
  - Summer (DST): UTC-5 (CDT)
- ZIP code: 71471
- Area code: 318
- GNIS feature ID: 2586708

Saint Maurice is a majority black census-designated place and unincorporated community in Winn Parish, Louisiana. United States. Its population was 323 as of the 2010 census. Its ZIP code is 71471.

== History ==
Until June 5, 1981, the historic St. Maurice Plantation sat near the bank of the Red River which is now an oxbow.

== Demographics ==
St. Maurice first appeared as a census designated place in the 2010 U.S. census.

St. Maurice CDP, Louisiana – Racial and ethnic composition Note: the US Census treats Hispanic/Latino as an ethnic category. This table excludes Latinos from the racial categories and assigns them to a separate category. Hispanics/Latinos may be of any race.
Race / Ethnicity (NH = Non-Hispanic)	Pop 2010	Pop 2020	% 2010	% 2020
White alone (NH)	83	56	25.70%	21.05%
Black or African American alone (NH)	234	186	72.45%	69.92%
Native American or Alaska Native alone (NH)	2	4	0.62%	1.50%
Asian alone (NH)	1	0	0.31%	0.00%
Native Hawaiian or Pacific Islander alone (NH)	0	0	0.00%	0.00%
Other race alone (NH)	0	0	0.00%	0.00%
Mixed race or Multiracial (NH)	3	13	0.93%	4.89%
Hispanic or Latino (any race)	0	7	0.00%	2.63%
Total	323	266	100.00%	100.00%
