= Winn Parish, Louisiana =

Parish in Louisiana, United States

Coordinates: 31.95°N 92.64°W

- Parish
- Parish of Winn
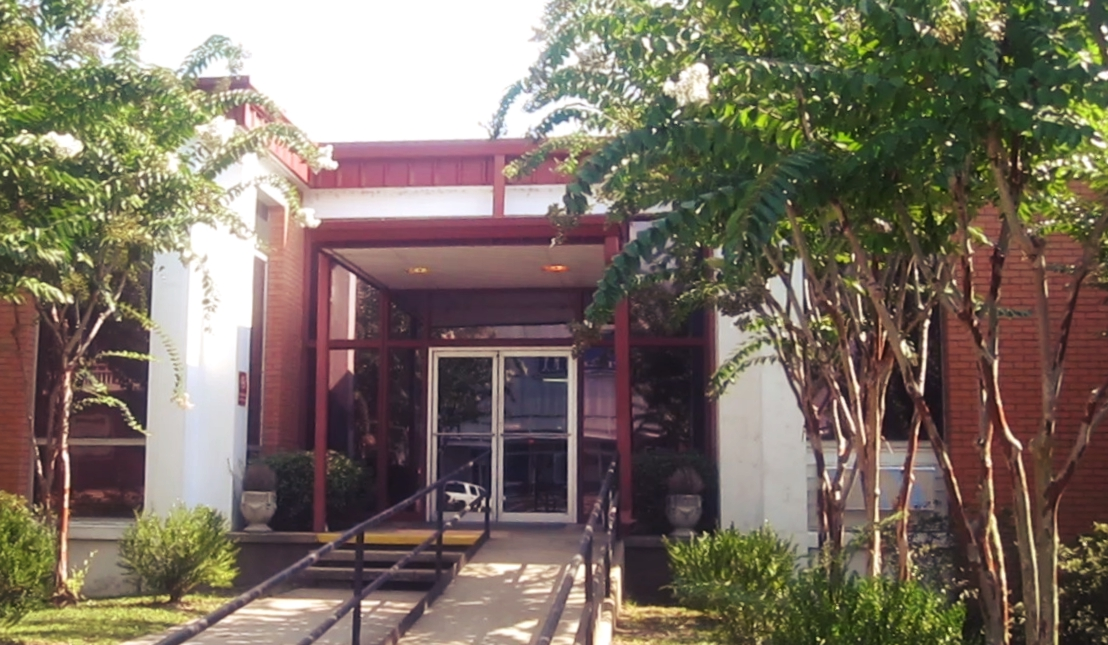
- Winn Parish Courthouse in Winnfield

- Location within the U.S. state of Louisiana

- Louisiana's location within the US
- Country: United States
- State: Louisiana
- Region: North Louisiana
- Founded: February 24, 1852; 174 years ago
- Named for: Walter Winn or Winfield Scott
- Parish seat (and largest city): Winnfield
- Incorporated municipalities: 6 (total): 1 city, 1 town, and 4 villages; (located entirely or partially within parish boundaries)

Area
  - Total: 957 sq mi (2,480 km^{2})
  - Land: 950 sq mi (2,500 km^{2})
  - Water: 6.7 sq mi (17 km^{2})
  - percentage: 0.7 sq mi (1.8 km^{2})

Population (2020)
  - Total: 13,755
  - Estimate (2025): 14,961 ▲
  - Density: 14/sq mi (5.6/km^{2})
- Time zone: UTC-6 (CST)
  - Summer (DST): UTC-5 (CDT)
- Area code: 318
- Congressional district: 5th
- Website: winnparishpolicejury.com

Winn Parish is a parish located in the U.S. state of Louisiana. As of the 2020 census, the population was 13,755. The parish seat and largest city is Winnfield. The parish was founded in 1852. It is last in alphabetical order of Louisiana's sixty-four parishes. Winn is separated from Natchitoches Parish along U.S. Highway 71 by Saline Bayou, the first blackwater protected waterway in the American South.

== History ==
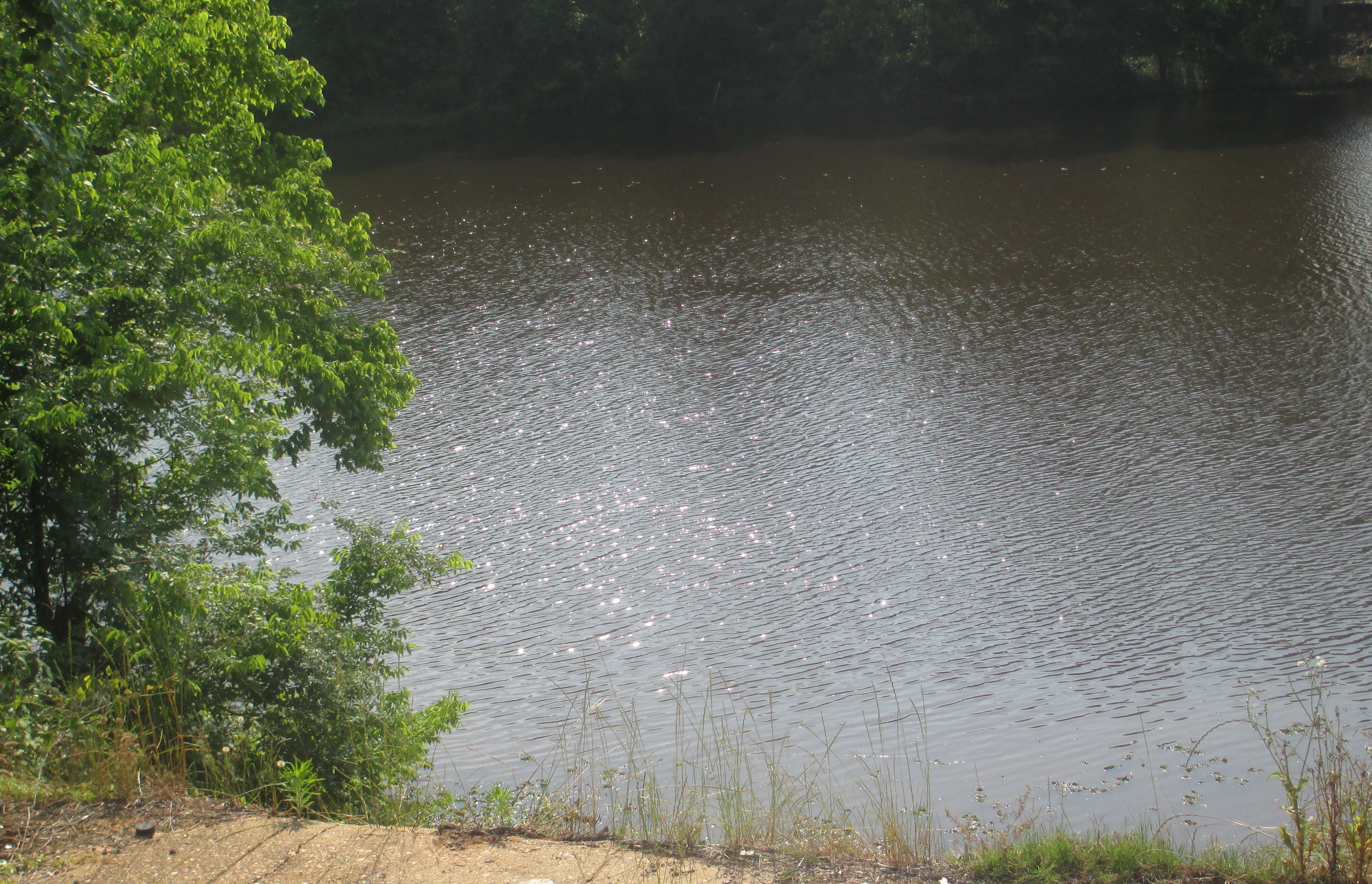
Saline Bayou

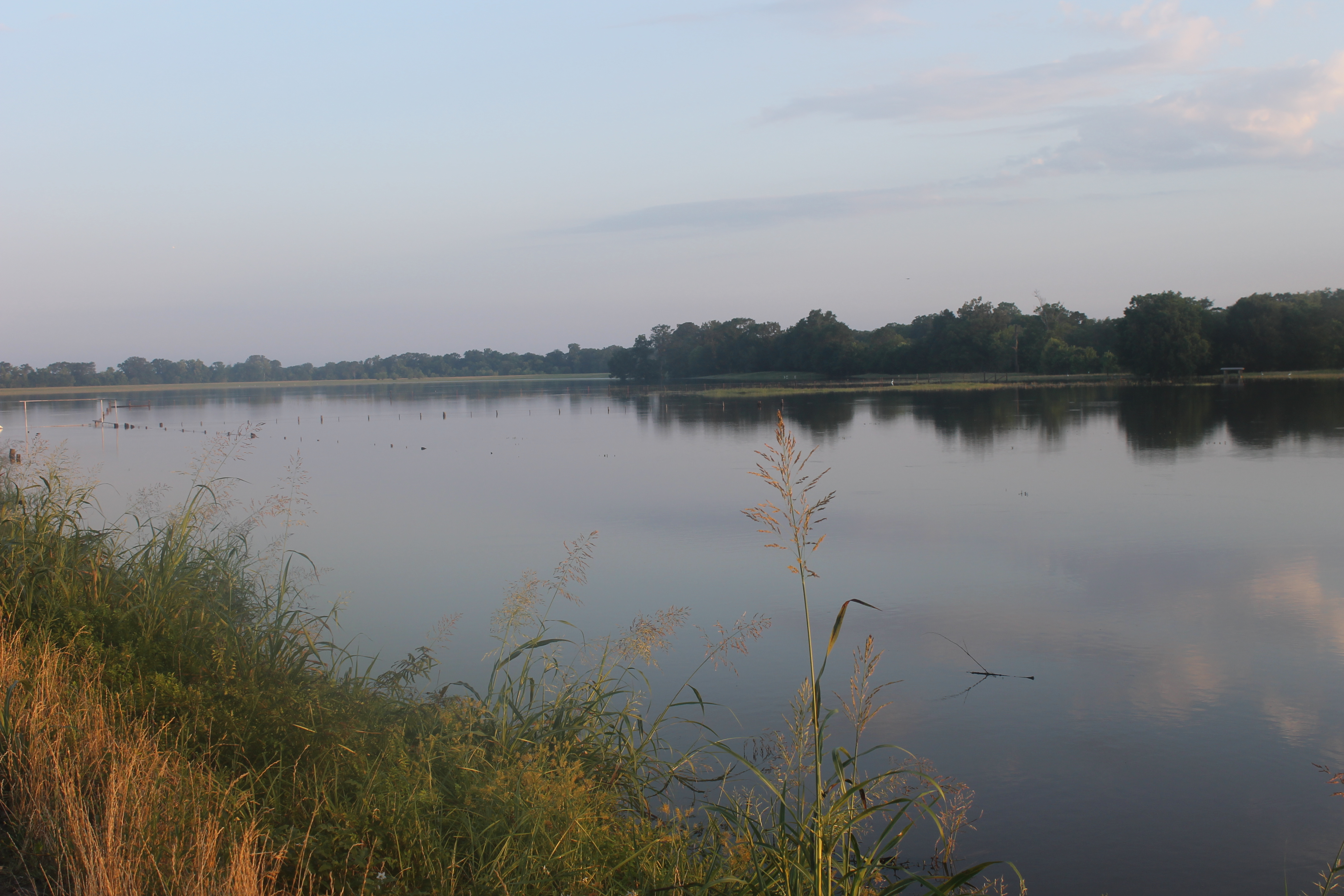
Backwater flooding in Winn Parish led temporarily in June 2015 to a detour around U.S. Highway 71 at St. Maurice, Louisiana.

Winn Parish was established in 1852 from lands which had belonged to the parishes of Catahoula, Natchitoches, and Rapides.

During the Civil War, David Pierson, a young attorney, was elected to represent the parish at the Secession Convention called in January 1861 in Baton Rouge by Governor Thomas Overton Moore. Pierson voted against secession and refused, along with several others, to change his "no" vote at the end of the process when asked to do so to make the final tally unanimous.

That these conscripts refused to fight for the Confederacy is understandable considering that Union support was higher in north Louisiana, and especially high in Winn Parish. The Confederate States Army defeated a Union detachment sent to destroy a salt works in the parish. Winn Parish contributed to the $80,000 raised to build fortifications on the nearby Red River.

After the war, bandits roamed the Natchez Trace or Harrisonburg Road that ran through the lower part of the parish. Among the worst were the West and Kimbrell clan. For seven years they preyed especially on travelers and migrants passing through the area.

In April 1873, white Democrats forming a militia from Winn Parish joined with ex-Confederate veterans from Rapides and Grant parishes against Republican blacks in the Colfax massacre in neighboring Grant Parish. They attacked freedmen defending the parish courthouse and two Republican officeholders in the aftermath to the disputed gubernatorial election of 1872. Among the 80–150 blacks killed were at least 50 who had surrendered; a total of three white men were killed in the confrontation.

== Geography ==
According to the U.S. Census Bureau, the parish has a total area of 957 square miles (2,480 km^{2}), of which 950 square miles (2,500 km^{2}) is land and 6.7 square miles (17 km^{2}) (0.7%) is water.

=== Major highways ===
- U.S. Highway 71
- U.S. Highway 84
- U.S. Highway 167
- Louisiana Highway 34
- Louisiana Highway 126
- Louisiana Highway 127
- Louisiana Highway 156
- Louisiana Highway 471
- Louisiana Highway 472
- Louisiana Highway 477
- Louisiana Highway 499
- Louisiana Highway 500
- Louisiana Highway 501
- Louisiana Highway 505
- Louisiana Highway 1228
- Louisiana Highway 1229
- Louisiana Highway 1231-1
- Louisiana Highway 1231-2
- Louisiana Highway 1232
- Louisiana Highway 1233
- Louisiana Highway 1234
- Louisiana Highway 1235
- Louisiana Highway 1236
- Louisiana Highway 1237
- Louisiana Highway 1238
- Louisiana Highway 3098
- Louisiana Highway 3136

=== Adjacent parishes ===
- Jackson Parish (north)
- Caldwell Parish (northeast)
- La Salle Parish (southeast)
- Grant Parish (south)
- Natchitoches Parish (west)
- Bienville Parish (northwest)

=== National protected area ===
- Kisatchie National Forest (part)
- Saline Bayou

== Communities ==
=== City ===
- Winnfield (parish seat and largest municipality)

=== Town ===
- Tullos (partial)

=== Villages ===
- Atlanta
- Calvin
- Dodson
- Sikes

=== Unincorporated areas ===
==== Census-designated places ====
- Jordan Hill
- Joyce
- Saint Maurice

==== Other communities ====
- Packton
- Tannehill
- Wheeling

== Demographics ==
Historical population
Census	Pop.	Note	%±
1860	6,876		—
1870	4,954		−28.0%
1880	5,846		18.0%
1890	7,082		21.1%
1900	9,648		36.2%
1910	18,357		90.3%
1920	16,119		−12.2%
1930	14,766		−8.4%
1940	16,923		14.6%
1950	16,119		−4.8%
1960	16,034		−0.5%
1970	16,369		2.1%
1980	17,253		5.4%
1990	16,269		−5.7%
2000	16,894		3.8%
2010	15,313		−9.4%
2020	13,755		−10.2%
2025 (est.)	14,961	▲	8.8%
U.S. Decennial Census; 1790–1960 1900–1990; 1990–2000 2010

=== 2020 census ===
As of the 2020 census, the parish had a population of 13,755, 5,181 households, and 3,661 families residing there.

The median age was 40.1 years; 20.7% of residents were under the age of 18 and 18.7% of residents were 65 years of age or older. For every 100 females there were 113.0 males, and for every 100 females age 18 and over there were 115.5 males age 18 and over.

The racial makeup of the parish was 62.5% White, 25.6% Black or African American, 0.6% American Indian and Alaska Native, 1.3% Asian, 0.1% Native Hawaiian and Pacific Islander, 6.3% from some other race, and 3.6% from two or more races. Hispanic or Latino residents of any race comprised 7.4% of the population.

34.0% of residents lived in urban areas, while 66.0% lived in rural areas.

There were 5,181 households in the parish, of which 29.0% had children under the age of 18 living in them. Of all households, 41.4% were married-couple households, 21.6% were households with a male householder and no spouse or partner present, and 32.2% were households with a female householder and no spouse or partner present. About 32.3% of all households were made up of individuals and 15.1% had someone living alone who was 65 years of age or older.

There were 6,339 housing units, of which 18.3% were vacant. Among occupied housing units, 71.5% were owner-occupied and 28.5% were renter-occupied. The homeowner vacancy rate was 0.9% and the rental vacancy rate was 6.9%.

=== Racial and ethnic composition ===
Winn Parish, Louisiana – Racial and ethnic composition Note: the US Census treats Hispanic/Latino as an ethnic category. This table excludes Latinos from the racial categories and assigns them to a separate category. Hispanics/Latinos may be of any race.
Race / Ethnicity (NH = Non-Hispanic)	Pop 1980	Pop 1990	Pop 2000	Pop 2010	Pop 2020	% 1980	% 1990	% 2000	% 2010	% 2020
White alone (NH)	12,281	11,270	11,100	10,108	8,498	71.18%	69.27%	65.70%	66.01%	61.78%
Black or African American alone (NH)	4,820	4,775	5,396	4,666	3,518	27.94%	29.35%	31.94%	30.47%	25.58%
Native American or Alaska Native alone (NH)	20	61	81	96	77	0.12%	0.37%	0.48%	0.63%	0.56%
Asian alone (NH)	20	22	27	39	172	0.12%	0.14%	0.16%	0.25%	1.25%
Native Hawaiian or Pacific Islander alone (NH)	x	x	9	2	16	x	x	0.05%	0.01%	0.12%
Other race alone (NH)	4	2	2	7	25	0.02%	0.01%	0.01%	0.05%	0.18%
Mixed race or Multiracial (NH)	x	x	132	155	426	x	x	0.78%	1.01%	3.10%
Hispanic or Latino (any race)	108	139	147	240	1,023	0.63%	0.85%	0.87%	1.57%	7.44%
Total	17,253	16,269	16,894	15,313	13,755	100.00%	100.00%	100.00%	100.00%	100.00%

== Education ==
Winn Parish School Board operates local public schools in all of the parish.

== Corrections ==
Winn Correctional Center is in an unincorporated section of Winn Parish. Corrections Corporation of America, under contract with Louisiana Department of Public Safety and Corrections, once operated the prison.

== National Guard ==
"A" Company of the Louisiana National Guard 199th Forward Support Battalion was previously located in Winnfield, Louisiana. The unit deployed twice to Iraq as part of the 256TH IBCT in 2004-5 and 2010. The unit's Winnfield Armory was closed.

== Politics ==
Winn Parish, Louisiana, has distinguished itself as a notable indicator of statewide electoral outcomes. This parish has consistently mirrored the state's choice for the presidential winner in 15 consecutive elections since 1964.

United States presidential election results for Winn Parish, Louisiana
Year	Republican		Democratic		Third party(ies)	
Year	No.	%	No.	%	No.	%
1912	26	2.50%	600	57.75%	413	39.75%
1916	50	5.45%	868	94.55%	0	0.00%
1920	291	19.70%	963	65.20%	223	15.10%
1924	120	13.09%	797	86.91%	0	0.00%
1928	533	31.46%	1,161	68.54%	0	0.00%
1932	36	1.60%	2,172	96.71%	38	1.69%
1936	254	9.60%	2,393	90.40%	0	0.00%
1940	382	13.02%	2,552	86.98%	0	0.00%
1944	881	38.57%	1,403	61.43%	0	0.00%
1948	333	11.37%	940	32.08%	1,657	56.55%
1952	1,915	46.47%	2,206	53.53%	0	0.00%
1956	1,736	49.56%	1,225	34.97%	542	15.47%
1960	1,839	44.90%	1,108	27.05%	1,149	28.05%
1964	4,366	78.54%	1,193	21.46%	0	0.00%
1968	1,050	16.68%	1,230	19.54%	4,015	63.78%
1972	4,235	70.40%	1,490	24.77%	291	4.84%
1976	3,209	46.58%	3,543	51.43%	137	1.99%
1980	3,944	52.26%	3,411	45.20%	192	2.54%
1984	4,934	63.85%	2,633	34.08%	160	2.07%
1988	4,165	59.02%	2,699	38.25%	193	2.73%
1992	2,932	38.84%	3,537	46.85%	1,080	14.31%
1996	2,803	37.56%	3,779	50.64%	881	11.80%
2000	4,028	63.32%	2,167	34.07%	166	2.61%
2004	4,366	67.10%	2,056	31.60%	85	1.31%
2008	4,632	68.40%	2,047	30.23%	93	1.37%
2012	4,541	69.50%	1,919	29.37%	74	1.13%
2016	4,608	72.32%	1,644	25.80%	120	1.88%
2020	4,619	74.20%	1,543	24.79%	63	1.01%
2024	4,437	76.75%	1,292	22.35%	52	0.90%

== Notable people ==
- O.K. Allen, governor of Louisiana
- T. C. Brister, member of the Louisiana House of Representatives
- Huey Long, governor of Louisiana
- Earl Kemp Long, governor of Louisiana
- Jimmy D. Long, member of the Louisiana House of Representatives

== See also ==
- National Register of Historic Places listings in Winn Parish, Louisiana
