= Carter House =

Carter House may refer to:

- Carter–Jones House, Yellville, Arkansas, listed on the National Register of Historic Places (NRHP) in Marion County
- Carter House Inn, Eureka, California, a 1982 remake of San Francisco home lost in 1906
- Walde–Carter House, Washington, D.C., in Northwest Quadrant
- Leonard Carter House, Jesup, Georgia, NRHP-listed in Wayne County
- Ritch–Carter–Martin House, Odum, Georgia, NRHP-listed in Wayne County
- Jimmy Carter National Historic Site, Plains, Georgia, NRHP-listed in Sumter County
- Bond–Baker–Carter House, Royston, Georgia, NRHP-listed in Franklin County
- Frederick B. Carter Jr. House, Evanston, Illinois, NRHP-listed in Cook County
- Carter House (Elkader, Iowa), NRHP-listed in Clayton County
- Nicholas Carter House, Hodgenville, Kentucky, NRHP-listed in LaRue County
- Atkins–Carter House, Louisa, Kentucky, NRHP-listed in Lawrence County
- Elmore–Carter House, Summersville, Kentucky, NRHP-listed in Green County
- Carter House (Versailles, Kentucky), NRHP-listed in Woodford County
- Carter House (Hammond, Louisiana), NRHP-listed in Tangipahoa Parish
- Carter Plantation, Springfield, Louisiana, NRHP-listed in Livingston Parish
- Carter Mansion, Reading, Massachusetts, NRHP-listed
- Carter–Callaway House, Ocean Springs, Mississippi, NRHP-listed in Jackson County
- Benjamin H. Carter House, Quitman, Mississippi, NRHP-listed in Clarke County
- Carter–Swain House, Democrat, North Carolina, NRHP-listed in Buncombe County
- Roberts–Carter House, Gatesville, North Carolina, NRHP-listed in Gates County
- W. F. Carter House, Mount Airy, North Carolina, NRHP-listed in Surry County
- William Carter House, Mount Airy, North Carolina, NRHP-listed in Surry County
- John Carter Farmstead, Youngstown, New York, NRHP-listed in Niagara County
- H. B. Carter House, Ashland, Oregon, NRHP-listed in Jackson County
- E. V. Carter House, Ashland, Oregon, NRHP-listed in Jackson County
- Carter–Fortmiller House, Ashland, Oregon, NRHP-listed in Jackson County
- Carter–Goodrich House, Dayton, Oregon, NRHP-listed in Yamhill County
- Carter–Worth House and Farm, Marshallton, Pennsylvania, NRHP-listed in Chester County
- John and Landon Carter House, Elizabethton, Tennessee, NRHP-listed in Carter County, Tennessee
- Carter House (Franklin, Tennessee), a Tennessee state-owned historic site
- W. T. Carter Jr. House, Houston, Texas, NRHP-listed in Harris County
- Maverick–Carter House, San Antonio, Texas, NRHP-listed in Bexar County
- Carter–Terry–Call House, Orem, Utah, NRHP-listed in Utah County
- Carter–Gilmer House, Charlottesville, Virginia, NRHP-listed
- A. P. and Sara Carter House, Maces Spring, Virginia, NRHP-listed in Scott County
- A. P. Carter Homeplace, Maces Spring, Virginia, NRHP-listed in Scott County
- Maybelle and Ezra Carter House, Maces Spring, Virginia, NRHP-listed in Scott County
- John Waddey Carter House, Martinsville, Virginia, NRHP-listed in Henry County
- Carter Farm, Wheeling, West Virginia, NRHP-listed in Ohio County

== See also ==
- Carter Block, St. Cloud, Minnesota, NRHP-listed
