= National Register of Historic Places listings in Tangipahoa Parish, Louisiana =

Location of Tangipahoa Parish in Louisiana

This is a list of the National Register of Historic Places listings in Tangipahoa Parish, Louisiana.

This is intended to be a complete list of the properties and districts on the National Register of Historic Places in Tangipahoa Parish, Louisiana, United States. The locations of National Register properties and districts for which the latitude and longitude coordinates are included below, may be seen in a map.

There are 32 properties and districts listed on the National Register in the parish. Another 7 properties were once listed but have been removed.

This National Park Service list is complete through NPS recent listings posted February 20, 2026.

== Current listings ==
	Name on the Register	Image	Date listed	Location	City or town	Description
1	Arcola Presbyterian Church	Arcola Presbyterian Church	October 22, 1982 (#82000462)	Church St. 30°46′34″N 90°31′04″W	Arcola	
2	Blythewood	Blythewood	June 25, 1982 (#82002795)	205 Elm St. 30°43′51″N 90°29′55″W	Amite City	
3	Camp Moore	Camp Moore	August 21, 1979 (#79001092)	Off Louisiana Highway 440; 30°53′06″N 90°30′18″W	Tangipahoa vicinity	
4	Carter House	Carter House	August 11, 1982 (#82002796)	South of Hammond on Happywoods Rd. 30°28′31″N 90°29′33″W	Hammond vicinity	
5	Cate House	Cate House	May 20, 1998 (#98000571)	111 N. Magnolia St. 30°30′14″N 90°27′50″W	Hammond	
6	Downtown Amite Historic District	Downtown Amite Historic District	March 19, 1998 (#98000252)	Roughly along Central Ave., Oak St., and Mulberry St. 30°43′35″N 90°30′32″W	Amite City	
7	Episcopal Church of the Incarnation	Episcopal Church of the Incarnation	October 8, 1980 (#80001759)	111 E. Olive St. 30°43′48″N 90°30′24″W	Amite City	
8	Epney		June 21, 1984 (#84001362)	Off Louisiana Highway 445; 30°42′36″N 90°19′16″W	Amite City vicinity	
9	First Christian Church		August 2, 2017 (#100001433)	305 E. Charles St. 30°30′22″N 90°27′31″W	Hammond	
10	Grace Memorial Episcopal Church	Grace Memorial Episcopal Church	February 23, 1973 (#73000877)	100 W. Church St. 30°30′57″N 90°27′45″W	Hammond	
11	Greater St. James AME Church		August 2, 2017 (#100001434)	311 E. Michigan St. 30°30′35″N 90°27′33″W	Hammond	
12	Greenlawn	Greenlawn	May 31, 1980 (#80001760)	200 E. Chestnut St. 30°43′28″N 90°30′23″W	Amite City	
13	Hammond High School	Hammond High School	October 18, 1996 (#96001167)	500 E. Thomas; 30°30′16″N 90°27′20″W	Hammond	The building is no longer used by Hammond High School
14	Hammond High School Gymnasium		July 12, 2024 (#100010506)	305 W. Morris Avenue; 30°30′08″N 90°27′49″W	Hammond	
15	Hammond Historic District	Hammond Historic District	February 12, 1980 (#80001761)	Roughly bounded by Magnolia, Robert, Cherry, and Morris Sts.; also Cypress St.; also portions of 19 blks. roughly centered on East Thomas St. and NW Railroad Ave. 30°30′18″N 90°27′41″W	Hammond	See Hammond Historic District website; boundary changes were approved September 14, 2002 and September 29, 2022.
16	Husser School-Husser Community Center		December 28, 2020 (#100005986)	56280 LA 445; 30°40′19″N 90°19′51″W	Husser	
17	Independence Historic District		October 5, 1982 (#82000463)	Roughly bounded by Louisiana Highway 40, 5th St., Anzalone, and E. and W. Railroad Aves. 30°38′07″N 90°30′03″W	Independence	
18	Charles Adolph Kent Sr. House	Charles Adolph Kent Sr. House	October 10, 1985 (#85003098)	701 Ave., E. 30°56′21″N 90°30′59″W	Kentwood	
19	Miller Memorial Library		August 2, 2017 (#100001435)	108 S. Pine St. 30°30′09″N 90°27′53″W	Hammond	
20	McGehee Hall, Southeastern Louisiana University	McGehee Hall, Southeastern Louisiana University	January 18, 1985 (#85000094)	Southeastern Louisiana University; 30°30′41″N 90°28′02″W	Hammond	Oldest building on Southeastern Louisiana University's main campus
21	McGehee House	McGehee House	November 2, 1982 (#82000465)	1106 S. Holly St. 30°29′42″N 90°27′19″W	Hammond	
22	Mollere House		February 23, 2026 (#100011528)	39881 Beach Road; 30°26′33″N 90°20′05″W	Ponchatoula	
23	Mount's Villa		January 31, 1985 (#85000163)	Off Louisiana Highway 22; 30°26′05″N 90°29′14″W	Ponchatoula vicinity	
24	G. W. Nesom House	G. W. Nesom House	August 29, 1997 (#97000965)	50023 Louisiana Highway 51, N. 30°34′36″N 90°29′03″W	Tickfaw	
25	Nichols House		May 31, 1980 (#80001762)	2 miles west of Ponchatoula on Louisiana Highway 22; 30°26′25″N 90°28′24″W	Ponchatoula vicinity	
26	Oaks Hotel		December 9, 1979 (#79001090)	SW. Railroad Ave. 30°30′51″N 90°27′43″W	Hammond	
27	Ponchatoula Commercial Historic District	Ponchatoula Commercial Historic District	October 5, 1982 (#82000466)	Roughly bounded by 5th, 7th, Hickory, and Oak Sts. Boundary increase and decrease (listed July 25, 2012, refnum 12000426): 111, 180, 165, 138 N. 6th, 170, 175, 163-165, 138, 125 W. Hickory, 155 NW. Railroad Ave., 201, 245, 265, 275 W. Pine; 30°26′19″N 90°26′32″W	Ponchatoula	
28	Randal House	Randal House	February 19, 2008 (#08000029)	301 E. Michigan Ave. 30°30′41″N 90°27′36″W	Hammond	
29	Reed Farmstead Log Dependencies		January 21, 1993 (#92001821)	Louisiana Highway 445; 30°40′56″N 90°19′38″W	Husser	
30	Stevenson House	Stevenson House	November 17, 1982 (#82000467)	113 S. Pine; 30°30′10″N 90°27′50″W	Hammond	
31	Wascom House		February 19, 2008 (#08000030)	303 E. Michigan Ave. 30°30′41″N 90°27′35″W	Hammond	
32	Zemurray Gardens Lodge Complex		October 3, 1983 (#83003637)	Louisiana Highway 40; 30°37′29″N 90°19′53″W	Loranger vicinity	

== Former listings ==
	Name on the Register	Image	Date listed	Date removed	Location	City or town	Description
1	Dykes Log Cabin		September 12, 2002 (#02001036)	April 15, 2009	17250 State Line Rd. 30°59′55″N 90°26′29″W	Kentwood vicinity	Delisted after being moved to an unknown location out of state.
2	Green Shutters	Green Shutters	August 11, 1982 (#82002797)	March 19, 2024	Franklin St. 30°52′25″N 90°30′33″W	Tangipahoa	
3	June House		March 31, 1983 (#83000546)	May 2, 2016	408 E. Coleman Ave. 30°30′01″N 90°27′20″W	Hammond	
4	Loranger Methodist Church		October 5, 1982 (#82000464)	March 31, 2015	Allman Ave. and Magnolia Boulevard; 30°38′22″N 90°24′01″W	Loranger	
5	Pass Manchac Light	Pass Manchac Light	July 9, 1986 (#86001554)	January 31, 2019	Western end of Lake Pontchartrain; 30°17′48″N 90°17′52″W	Ponchatoula vicinity	1857 masonry structure gradually encroached upon by lake waters & finally destroyed by Hurricane Isaac (2012).
6	Tangipahoa Parish Training School Dormitory		July 27, 1979 (#79001091)	January 31, 2019	Off Louisiana Highway 38; 30°55′52″N 90°30′47″W	Kentwood	
7	Tangipahoa School	Tangipahoa School	August 1, 2003 (#03000705)	March 19, 2024	Junction of Jackson and Tarpley Sts. 30°52′37″N 90°30′47″W	Tangipahoa	

== See also ==
- List of National Historic Landmarks in Louisiana
- National Register of Historic Places listings in Louisiana
