= Cate House =

Cate House may refer to:

- Cate House (Hammond, Louisiana), listed on the National Register of Historic Places in Tangipahoa Parish, Louisiana
- Cate House (Castine, Maine), listed on the National Register of Historic Places in Hancock County, Maine
- Asa F. Cate Farm Ensemble, McMinnville, Oregon, listed on the National Register of Historic Places in Yamhill County, Oregon
- Elijah Cate House, Niota, Tennessee, listed on the National Register of Historic Places in McMinn County, Tennessee
