= Charles Emery Cate =

Charles Emery Cate (1831–1916) was the 19th-century developer of Hammond's Crossing, which became Hammond, Louisiana, United States.

Originally from New England, Cate donated $500, bricks and lumber, and the land for the construction of the city's oldest church – Grace Memorial Episcopal Church – and established a factory in Hammond for the manufacture of shoes worn by the Confederate troops during the American Civil War.

The factory, which was destroyed by Union troops during a skirmish in 1863, was on the current site of Hammond's Cate Square, a city park. The church continues, having been founded after the war. Its meeting place stands on West Church Street near the Canadian National Railway depot and Hammond Amtrak station, from which it is unmistakably visible to the west.

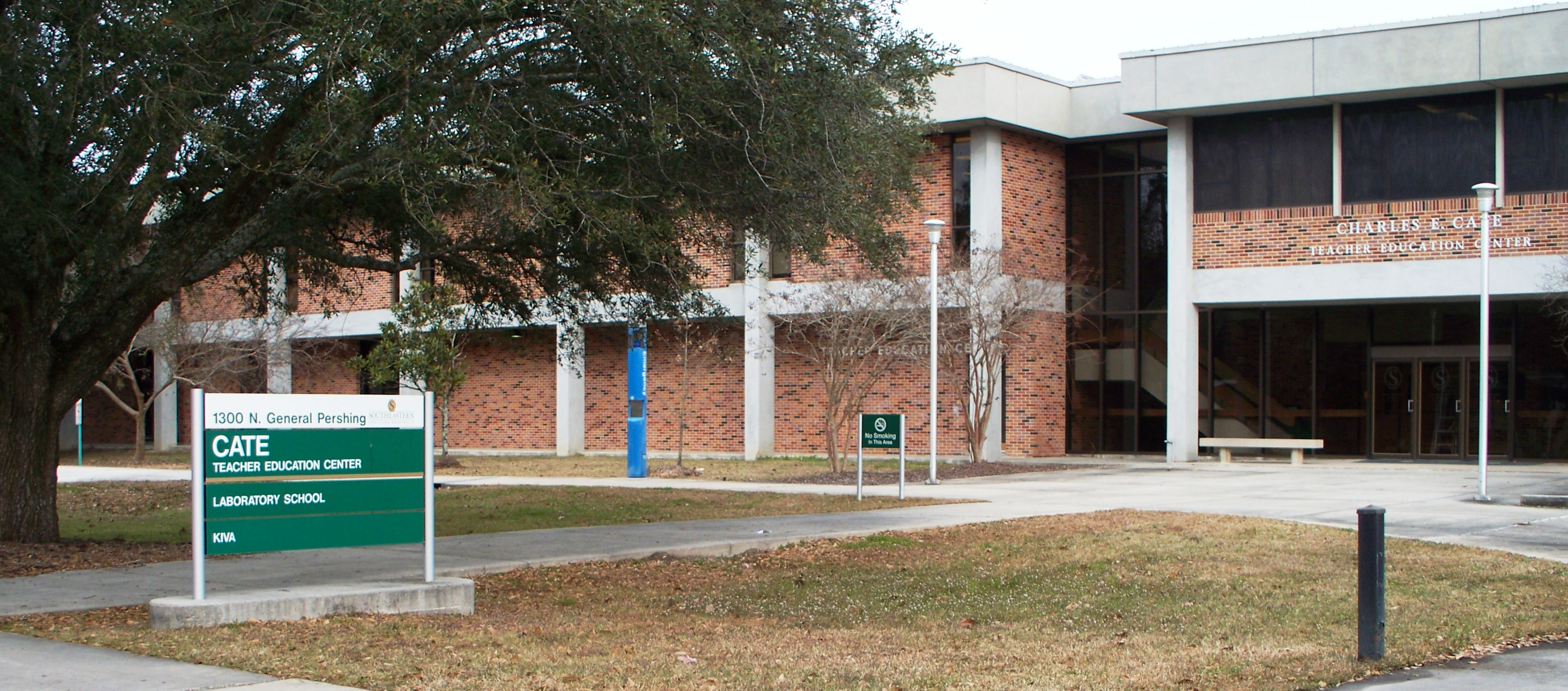
Charles Emery Cate Teacher Education Center at Southeastern Louisiana University, viewed from North General Pershing Street. Shown is a section of the west side of the building. The university's Laboratory School (K–8) is at the left.

Charles Emery Cate is the eponym for Cate Street in the city center (a historic district) and the Charles Emery Cate Teacher Education Center (see inset) at Southeastern Louisiana University.

== See also ==
- History of Hammond, La.
- National Register of Historic Places listings in Tangipahoa Parish, Louisiana
