= Pass Manchac Light =

Former lighthouse in Louisiana, United States

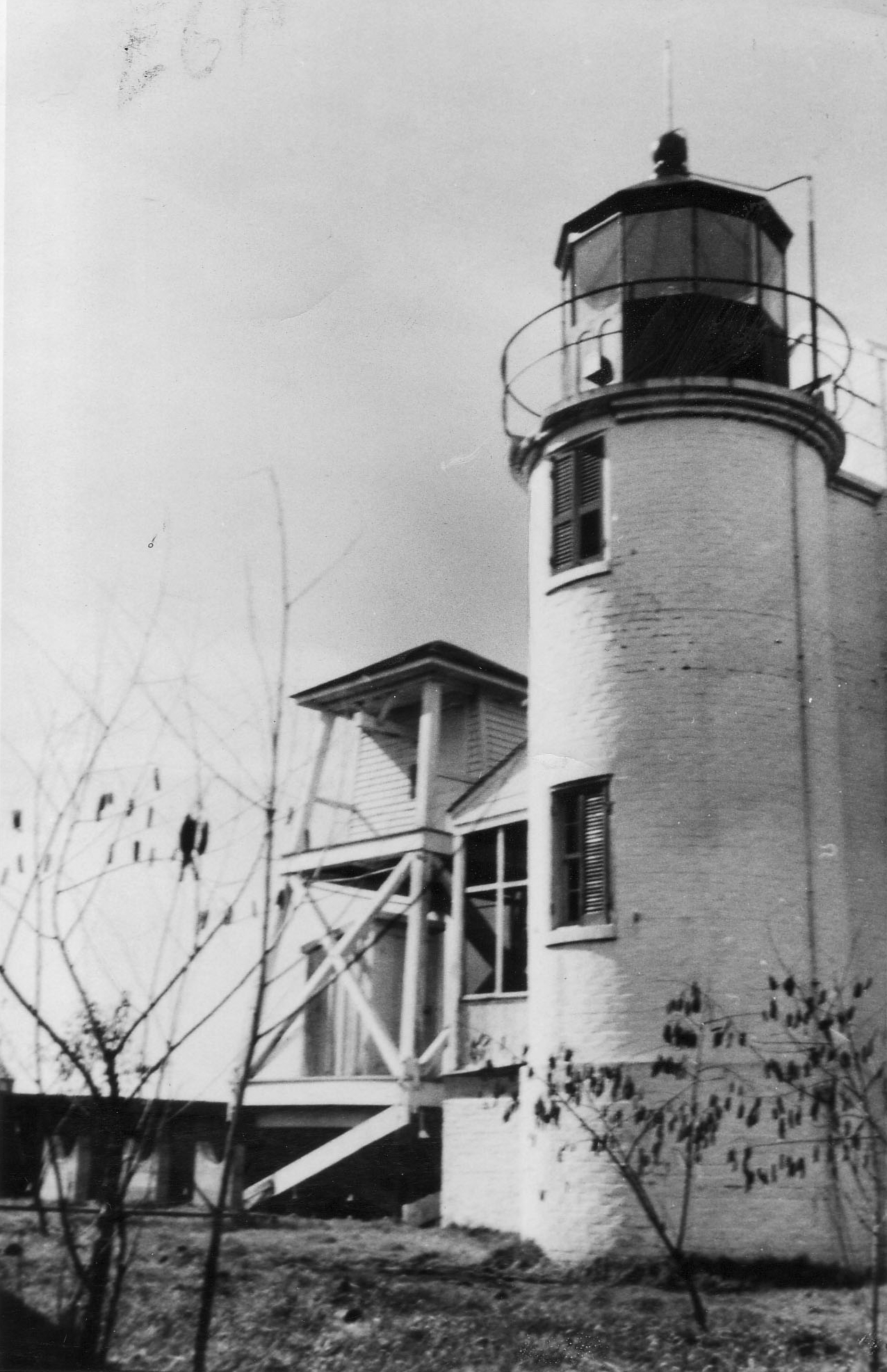
- Location: Manchac, Tangipahoa Parish, United States
- Coordinates: 30°17′48″N 90°17′54″W

Tower
- Constructed: 1837
- Construction: stone (foundation), brick (tower)
- Automated: 1941
- Height: 40 ft (12 m)
- Shape: cylinder
- Markings: White
- Fog signal: 1,200 pounds (540 kg) mechanical bell, 1898

Light
- First lit: 1857
- Deactivated: 1987
- Lens: fourth order Fresnel lens
- Characteristic: F R (–1865), F W (1865–)
- Pass Manchac Light
- Formerly listed on the U.S. National Register of Historic Places
- Nearest city: Ponchatoula, Louisiana
- Area: less than one acre
- Built: 1857
- Architectural style: Masonry lighthouse
- NRHP reference No.: 86001554

Significant dates
- Added to NRHP: July 9, 1986
- Removed from NRHP: January 31, 2019
- Active light
- Constructed: 1987

Pass Manchac Light was a historic lighthouse in Tangipahoa Parish, Louisiana, which was originally established in 1838, to mark the north side of the entrance to Pass Manchac, the channel between Lake Pontchartrain and Lake Maurepas. The fourth and last tower on this particular site was constructed in 1857 and was in service for 130 years. The first three had been built in 1838, 1842, and 1846, in each case requiring replacement due to poor construction and/or encroaching lake waters.

== History ==
The 1857 lighthouse, a brick cylinder with attached house, was damaged in the Civil War and during tropical storms in 1888, 1890, 1915, 1926, and 1931. The station was automated in 1941, and the keeper's house was removed in 1952, by which time the light was on an island instead of a peninsula.

Pass Manchac Light was added to the National Register of Historic Places in 1986. The light was functionally replaced in 1987 by the U.S. Coast Guard, which established a skeleton tower on the south side of the pass entrance.

On August 28, 2012, Louisiana was struck by Hurricane Isaac, destroying the lighthouse. It was removed from the National Register in January 2019.

However, since February 2008 its lantern room – which was removed from the tower in 2002 for restoration – has been located at the Lake Pontchartrain Basin Maritime Museum, in Madisonville, Louisiana.

== Gallery ==
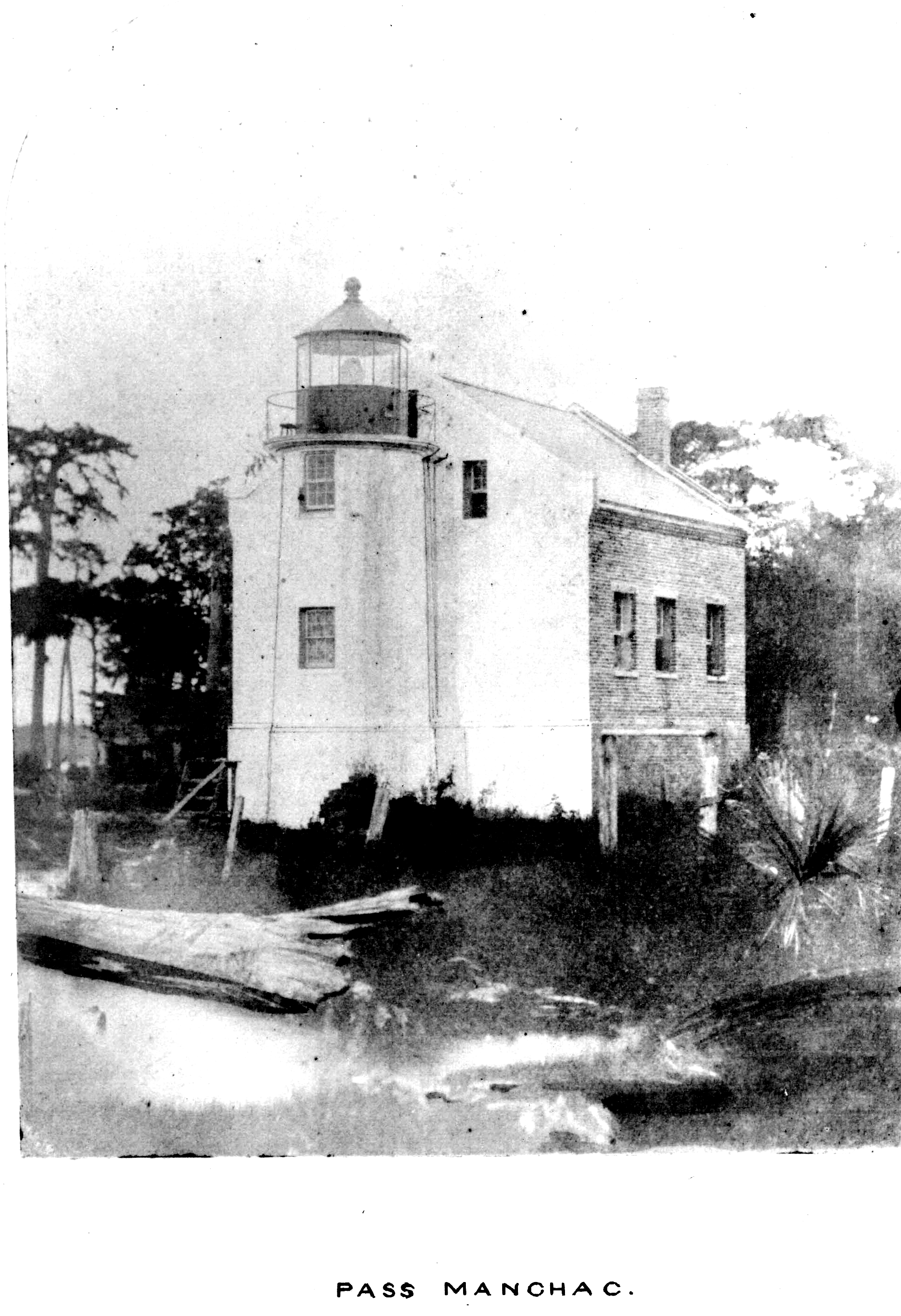
19th century

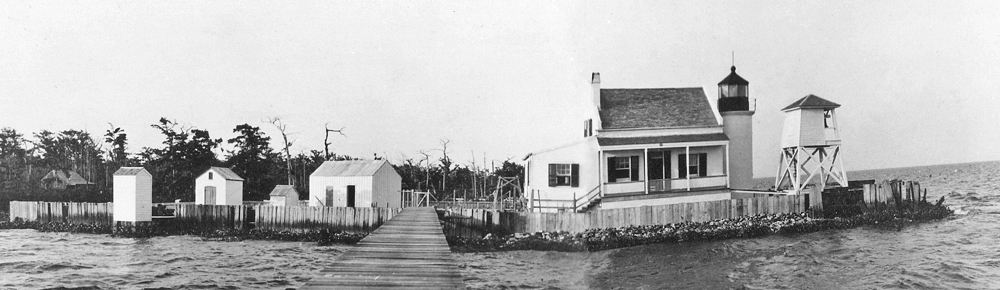
1914

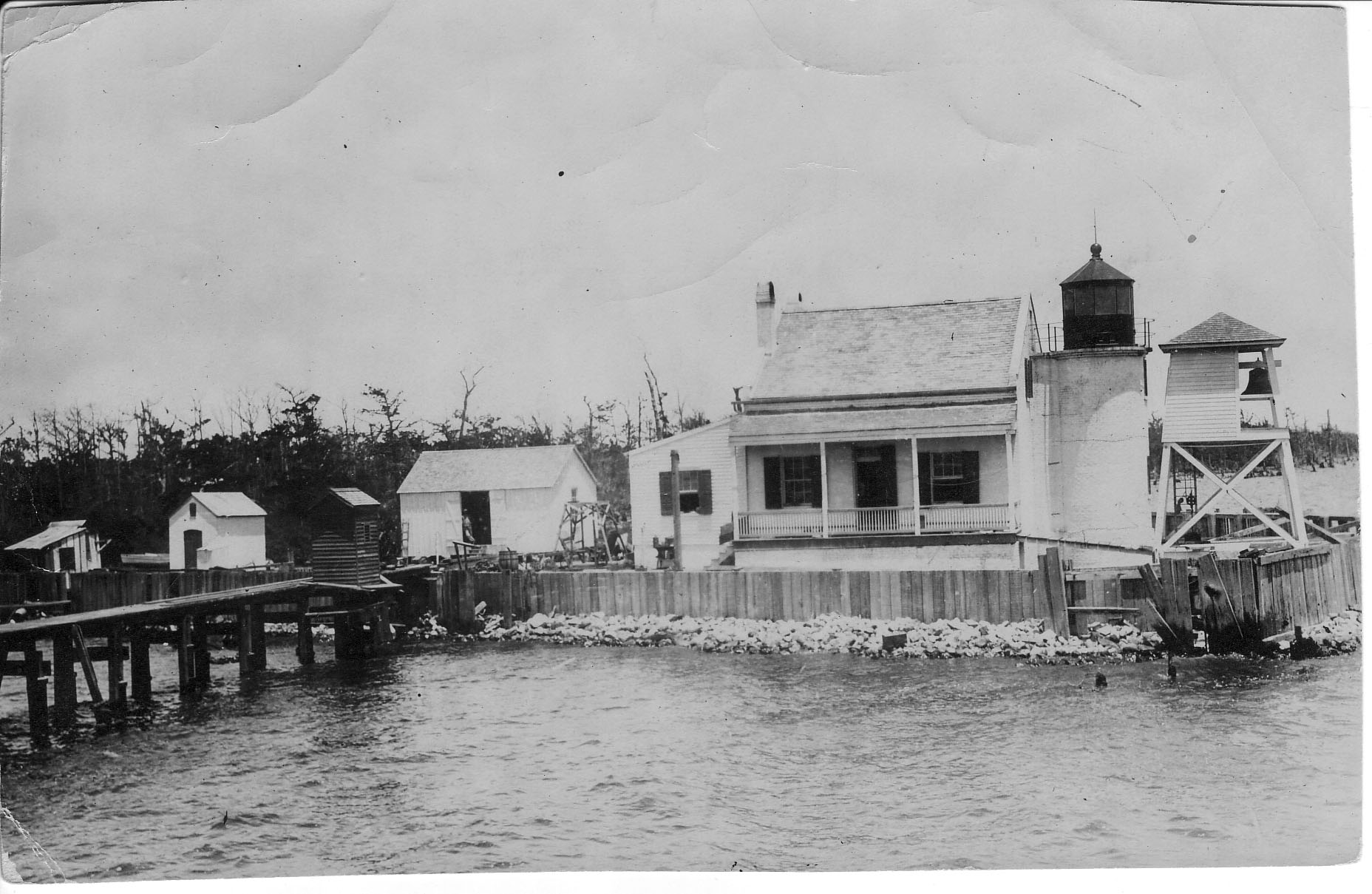
1918

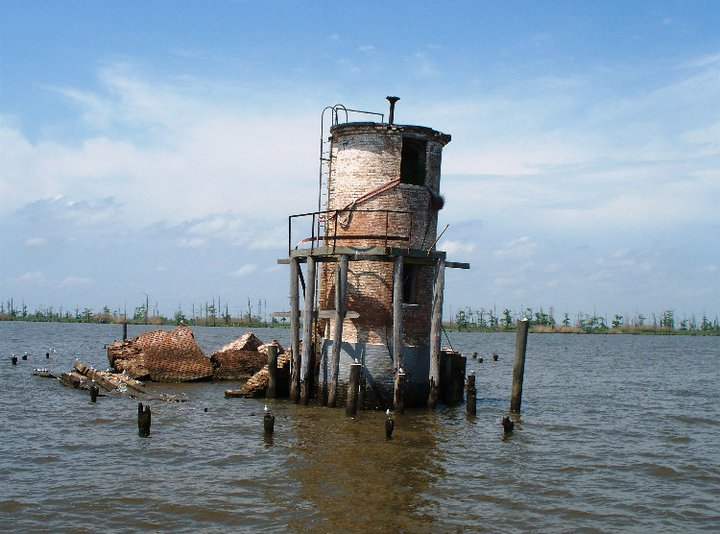
2011

== See also ==
- Manchac, Louisiana
- National Register of Historic Places listings in Tangipahoa Parish, Louisiana
