= Grace Memorial Episcopal Church (Hammond, Louisiana) =

Historic church in Louisiana, United States

- U.S. National Register of Historic Places
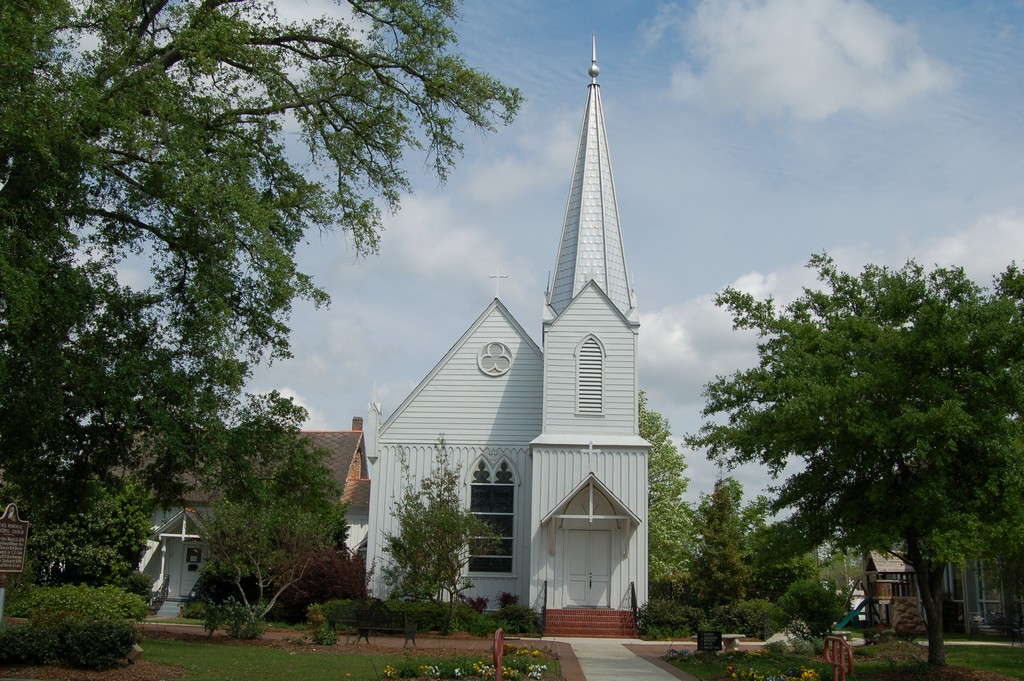

- Location within Louisiana Location within the United States
- Location: 100 W. Church St., Hammond, Louisiana
- Coordinates: 30°30′24.9876″N 90°27′44.1936″W
- Area: 0 acres (0 ha)
- Built: 1876
- Architectural style: Late Gothic Revival
- NRHP reference No.: 73000877
- Added to NRHP: February 23, 1973

Grace Memorial Episcopal Church is a historic church at 100 W. Church Street in Hammond, Louisiana, U.S.A.

It was built in 1876, consecrated in 1888, and added to the National Register of Historic Places in 1973.

== See also ==
- Charles Emery Cate (1831-1916)
- Episcopal Church of the Incarnation: also NRHP-listedin in Tangipahoa Parish
- National Register of Historic Places listings in Tangipahoa Parish, Louisiana
