= Randal House =

Historic house in Louisiana, United States

- U.S. National Register of Historic Places
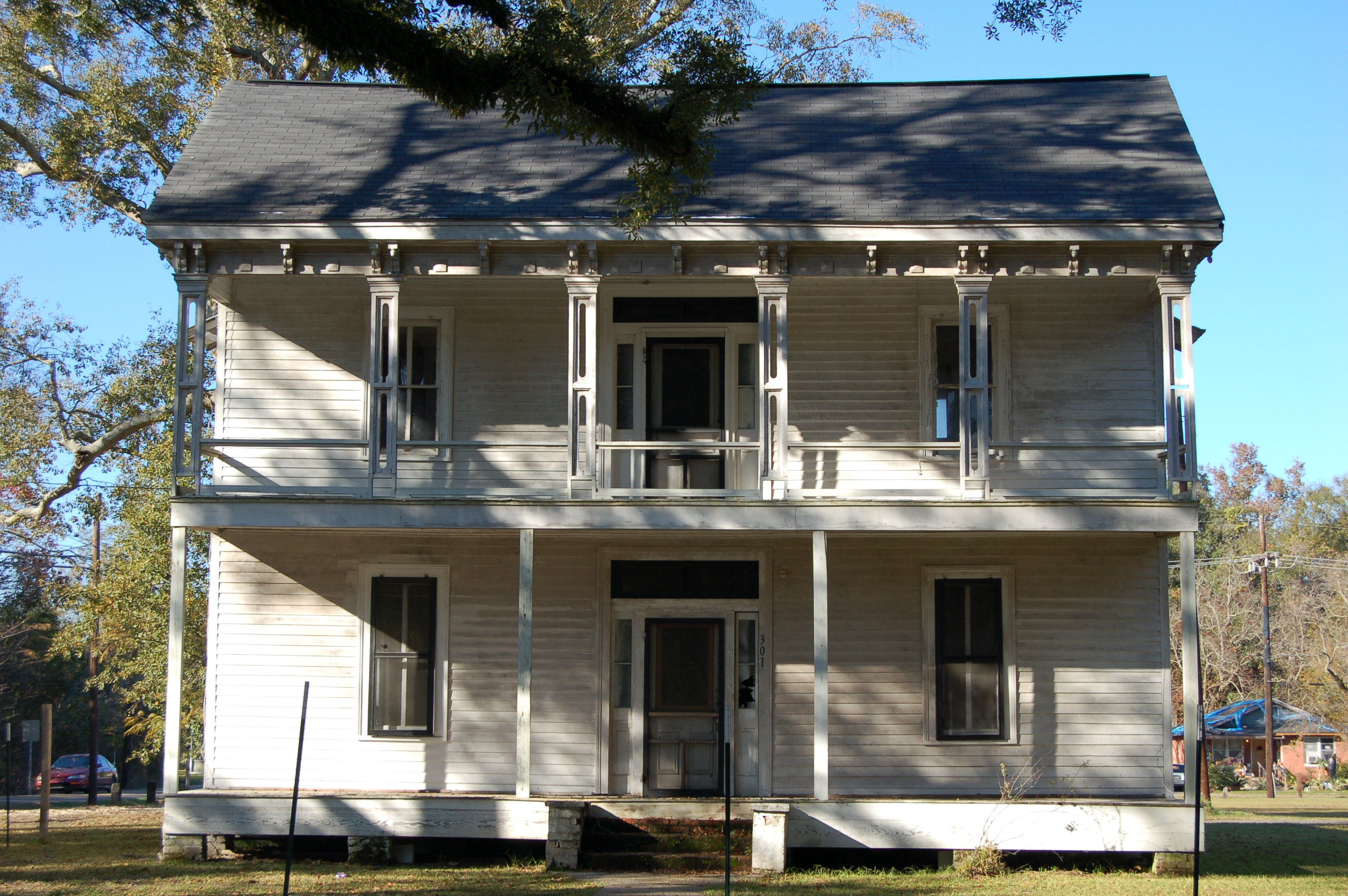

- Location within Louisiana
- Location: 301 E. Michigan Ave., Hammond, Louisiana
- Coordinates: 30°30′41″N 90°27′36″W
- Area: less than one acre
- Built: 1896
- Architectural style: Italianate
- NRHP reference No.: 08000029
- Added to NRHP: February 19, 2008

The Randal House is a historic mansion in Hammond, Louisiana, U.S.. It has been listed on the National Register of Historic Places since February 19, 2008.
