= Irwin Davis =

Saint Francis University football coach

Biographical details
- Born: Ponchatoula, Louisiana, U.S.

Playing career
- 1932–1934: Notre Dame

Coaching career (HC unless noted)
- 1949–1952: Saint Francis (PA)

Administrative career (AD unless noted)
- 1953–: Saint Francis (PA)

Head coaching record
- Overall: 14–27–1

Irwin Vincent Davis was an athletic director and head football coach at Saint Francis University, from which he retired in 1979. He was inducted into the Saint Francis University Athletics Hall of Fame in 1996.

== Early years ==
Born in Ponchatoula, Louisiana, Davis attended Ponchatoula High School where he participated in football, basketball, and track for four years. Davis matriculated to the University of Notre Dame where he was a three-year member of both the track team, and the football team as an offensive and defensive lineman. Davis majored in physical education.

== Head coaching record ==
Davis was head coach at Saint Francis for four seasons, compiling a record of 14–27–1.

Year	Team	Overall	Conference	Standing	Bowl/playoffs
Saint Francis Red Flash (Independent) (1949–1951)
1949	Saint Francis	4–4–1			
1950	Saint Francis	4–4			
1951	Saint Francis	3–5			
1952	Saint Francis	0–7			
1953	Saint Francis	3–7			
Saint Francis:		14–27–1			
Total:		14–27–1			
