= Greenlawn (Amite City, Louisiana) =

Historic house in Louisiana, United States

- U.S. National Register of Historic Places
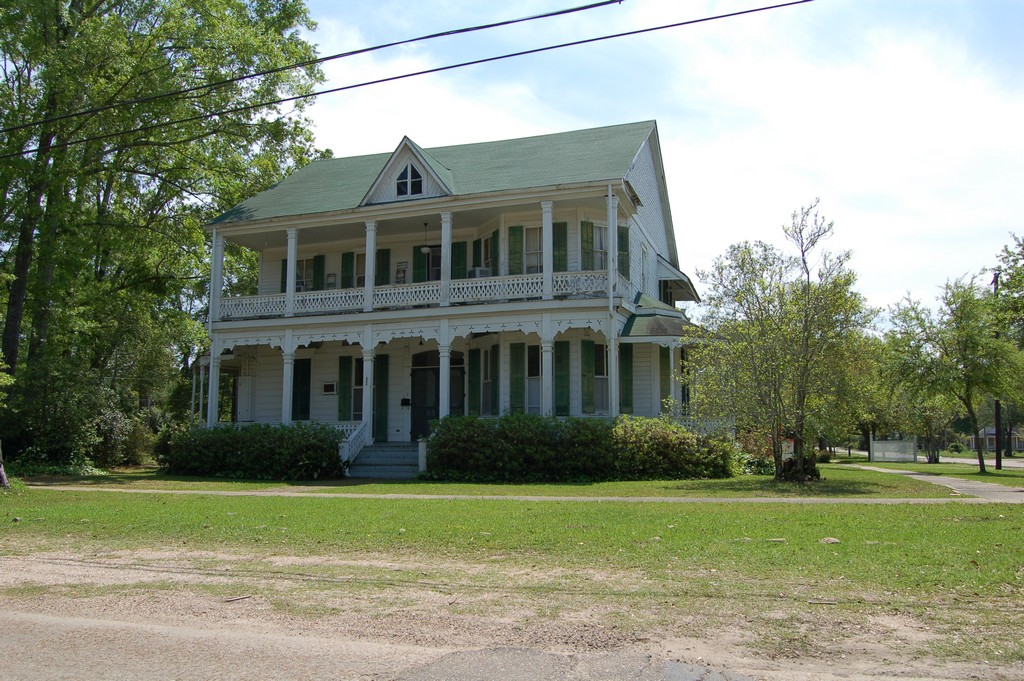

- Location within Louisiana
- Location: 200 E. Chestnut St., Amite, Louisiana
- Coordinates: 30°43′28″N 90°30′23″W
- Area: 0.3 acres (0.12 ha)
- Built: 1895
- Architectural style: Renaissance, Queen Anne
- NRHP reference No.: 80001760
- Added to NRHP: May 31, 1980

Greenlawn is a historic mansion in Amite City, Louisiana, U.S.. It has been listed on the National Register of Historic Places since May 31, 1980.
