= Loranger Methodist Church =

Historic church in Louisiana, United States

- Formerly listed on the U.S. National Register of Historic Places
- Location within Louisiana Location within the United States
- Location: Allman Ave. and Magnolia Blvd., Loranger, Louisiana
- Coordinates: 30°38′22″N 90°24′1″W
- Area: 0.1 acres (0.040 ha)
- Built: 1915
- Built by: O.R. Brown
- Architect: O.R. Brown
- Architectural style: Bungalow/American craftsman
- NRHP reference No.: 82000464

Significant dates
- Added to NRHP: October 5, 1982
- Removed from NRHP: March 31, 2015

Loranger Methodist Church, formerly at Allman Avenue and Magnolia Boulevard in Loranger, Louisiana, was built in 1915. It was added to the National Register in 1982. It was delisted, however, in 2015.

The church was built in 1915 and was lit by kerosene lanterns with a stable behind the church to accommodate horses. During the Great Depression the basement was used to teach the villagers how to preserve food.

It is a three-story building amidst a modern Loranger school complex, with a bungalow-style porch and a square belltower with a distinctive spreading pyramid roof. It was built of Louisiana Longleaf Yellow Pine donated by the Genesee Lumber Company, which donated lumber for another church and a school (neither of which survive), as part of making the area more attractive for in-migration of workers for the company.

The church became the center for many community activities: "The large sanctuary on the main floor doubled as an auditorium for plays and choral presentations for the bi-weekly 'excursions' of prospective customers the land agents kept bringing in. The auditorium also served for graduations from the school across the street; community service talks by farm experts; and in the 1920s, movies were regularly shown after careful previewing to keep Hollywood from embarrassing the sponsors."

A collection of Genesee Lumber Company historic photos, including of this church, is available at Southeastern Louisiana University. The historic company is not the same as a different company of the same name in Genesee County, New York, which was formed in 1928.

== See also ==
- Arcola Presbyterian Church: also NRHP-listedin in Tangipahoa Parish
- National Register of Historic Places listings in Tangipahoa Parish, Louisiana
