= Nichols House (Ponchatoula, Louisiana) =

- U.S. National Register of Historic Places
- Location within Louisiana Location within the United States
- Nearest city: Ponchatoula, Louisiana
- Coordinates: 30°26′25″N 90°28′24″W
- Area: 0.7 acres (0.28 ha)
- Built: c. 1880
- NRHP reference No.: 80001762
- Added to NRHP: May 31, 1980

Nichols House, near Ponchatoula, Louisiana, dates from around 1880. It was listed on the National Register of Historic Places in 1980.

It was built as

an extremely late version of the traditional Creole raised plantation house plan. There are four large rooms in the front and two cabinets in the rear with a small gallery between. (This rear gallery has since been enclosed.) The main gallery, which encompasses the front and sides of the house, is 90 feet across the front. It consists of milled Stick Style posts with triple stop chamfering and double foil capitals. The house has a board and batten exterior, plate glass windows, and handsome brick chimneys. The two large front doorways have been reworked with new doors and lights.The interior features beaded board on the walls and ceilings. This boarding is angled so as to form a diamond pattern on the dining room ceiling. Other interior features include transom doors and heavy pine Renaissance Revival mantels with burl wood entablatures, and Fleurs de Lis cut into central wooden keystone motifs.

It is located about two miles (3.2 km) west of Ponchatoula on Louisiana Highway 22, at the end of a 300-yard (270 m) alley of live oak (as of 1979).
