= Hammond station (Louisiana) =

Train station in Hammond, Louisiana, US

Hammond, LA
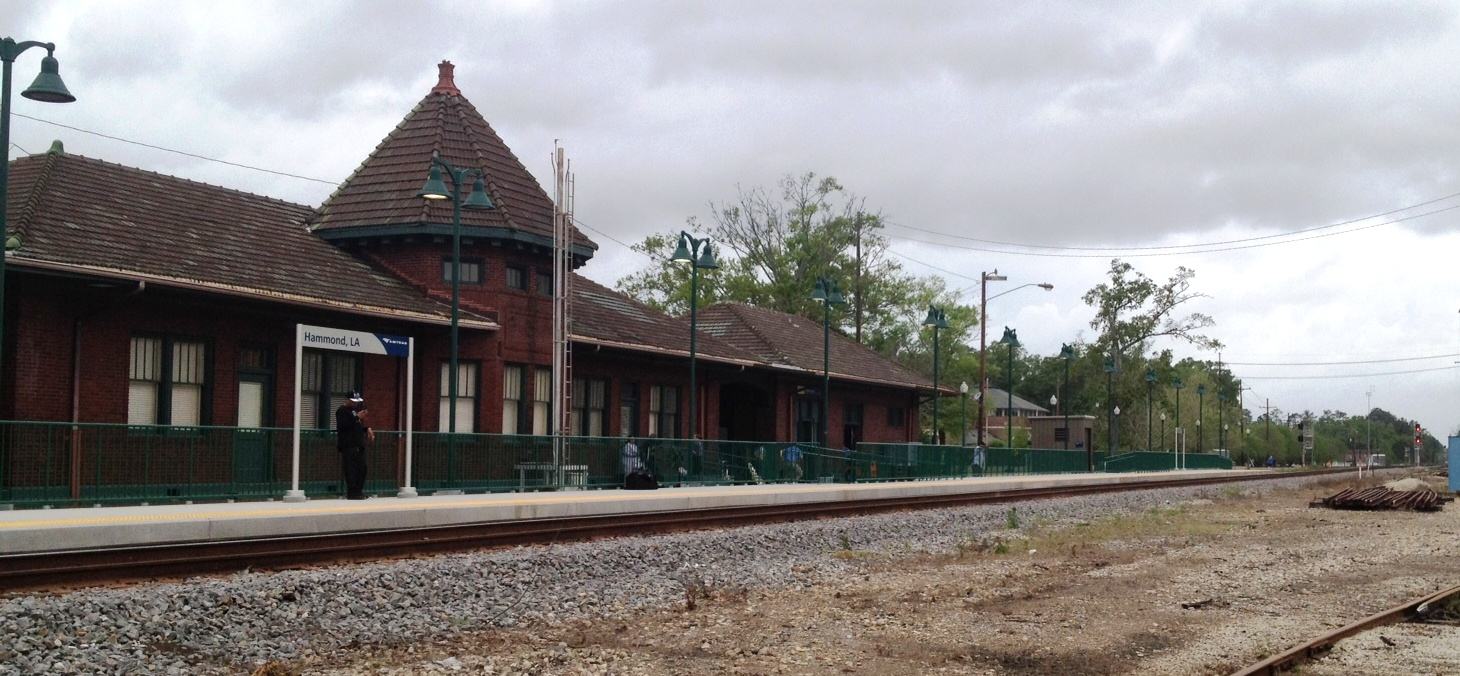
- Hammond station on March 20, 2012

General information
- Location: 404 N.W. Railroad Avenue; Hammond, Louisiana; United States
- Coordinates: 30°30′26″N 90°27′43″W
- Line: Illinois Central (CN)
- Platforms: 1 side platform
- Tracks: 1

Other information
- Station code: Amtrak: HMD

History
- Rebuilt: March 1, 1912

Passengers
- FY 2025: 10,108 (Amtrak)

Services
Preceding station	Amtrak	Following station
New Orleans Terminus	City of New Orleans	McComb toward Chicago
Former services
Preceding station	Illinois Central Railroad	Following station
Ponchatoula toward New Orleans	Main Line	Natalbany toward Chicago
Baptist toward Baton Rouge	Baton Rouge – Hammond	Terminus
Location

Hammond station is an Amtrak train station in Hammond, Louisiana, United States. It is a station on Amtrak's daily City of New Orleans route which runs between Chicago and New Orleans. The Illinois Central Railroad built the station in 1912. A freight station was built in Hammond in 1927 a few blocks south; however this station is no longer active except as a flea market and seafood restaurant.

Known locally as the Depot, Hammond's historic Amtrak station has been refurbished with a raised passenger platform. The railway, constructed in 1854 as part of the New Orleans, Jackson and Great Northern railroad, is now owned by the Canadian National Railway. Renovated in 2008, the depot also houses the Hammond Chamber of Commerce. The architectural firm Holly & Smith received the 2008 American Institute of Architects' New Orleans Award of Merit for Historic Preservation/Restoration/Rehabilitation for its work on the station.

Amtrak provides both ticketing and baggage services at the Hammond station.

== See also ==
- Charles Emery Cate
