= McGehee House (Hammond, Louisiana) =

Historic house in Louisiana, United States

- U.S. National Register of Historic Places
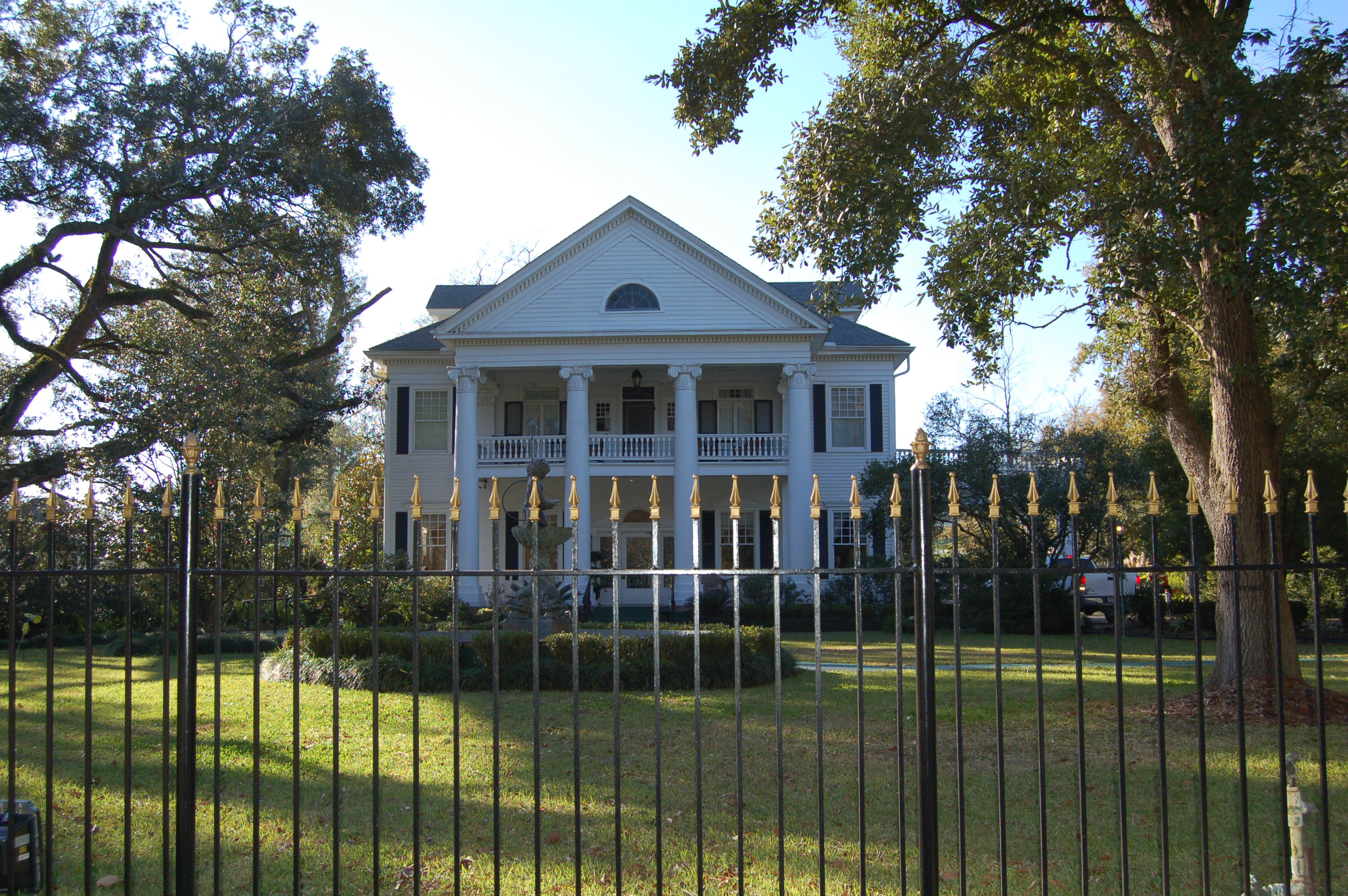

- Location within Louisiana
- Location: 1106 S. Holly St., Hammond, Louisiana
- Coordinates: 30°29′42″N 90°27′19″W
- Area: 0.7 acres (0.28 ha)
- Built: 1907
- Architectural style: Greek Revival
- NRHP reference No.: 82000465
- Added to NRHP: November 2, 1982

The McGehee House is a historic mansion in Hammond, Louisiana, U.S..

== History ==
The mansion was built in 1907 for Dr. Edward Larned McGehee Jr. and his wife, Aurora Wilkinson Gurley McGehee. It was inherited by their son, Edward Larned McGehee III, who married Augusta Louise Tucker and lived there with their children, Gurley Tucker McGehee Maurin, Edward Larned McGehee IV, and Rosamond Louise McGehee Lopez.

It was acquired by Michel and Isabel Marcais in 1998, and it was turned into an inn and restaurant called Michabelle.

In 2012 it was acquired by David and Sandra Bradley.

== Architectural significance ==
The mansion was designed in the Greek Revival architectural style. It has been listed on the National Register of Historic Places since November 2, 1982.
