= Episcopal Church of the Incarnation =

Historic church in Louisiana, United States

- U.S. National Register of Historic Places
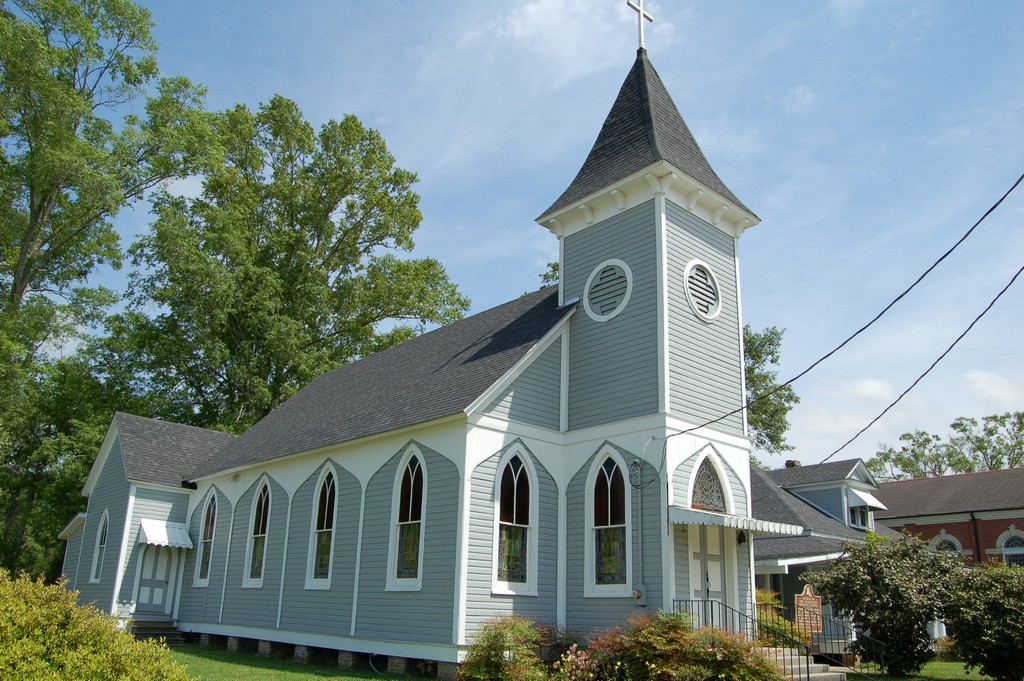

- Location within Louisiana Location within the United States
- Location: 111 E. Olive St., Amite, Louisiana
- Coordinates: 30°43′48″N 90°30′24″W
- Area: 0.3 acres (0.12 ha)
- Built: 1872, 1908
- Architectural style: Gothic Revival
- NRHP reference No.: 80001759
- Added to NRHP: October 8, 1980

Episcopal Church of the Incarnation is a historic church at 111 E. Olive Street in Amite, Louisiana. It was built in 1872 and modified in 1908. It was added to the National Register in 1980.

== History ==
Prior to the establishment of a parish, the Episcopal community of Amite was served by missionary priests, including R. H. Ranney, Bishop Joseph Wilmer, and Edward Fontaine. In January 1871, Henry Forrester began to hold a monthly service. The parish was organized on February 25, 1871, under the name the "Church of the Incarnation". John M. Bach donated three lots for the construction of a church.

In December 1872 the Herman Cope Duncan, missionary to this area, became the first rector, and work immediately commenced on building the church. The interior woodwork was all dressed lumber. Parishioners contributed a chalice and paten. St. Peter's Church in Brooklyn donated a font. Christ Church (New Orleans) provided substantial assistance. Duncan resigned in August 1873 and was followed by a succession of rectors. By 1887, services were held on Wednesday night only.

By 1908, the Church of the Incarnation was a mission church attended by J. W. Bleker. During the night of April 24, the church was destroyed in a tornado, which left only the chancel. It was rebuilt, An example of small-town Gothic ecclesiastical architecture, it was consecrated on December 3, 1916.

The church is part of the Northshore Deanery of the Episcopal Diocese of Louisiana.

== NRHP designation ==
Its NRHP nomination describes:

The Church of the Incarnation is significant in the area of architecture as a superior example of small town, turn-of-the-century Gothic church architecture. Most extant examples have lancet windows and towers, but the Church of the Incarnation has the additional refinement of an elegant flared spire, exterior broad pointed arches accentuating the bays and quatrefoil ventilators.

== See also ==
- Grace Memorial Episcopal Church: also NRHP-listedin in Tangipahoa Parish
- National Register of Historic Places listings in Tangipahoa Parish, Louisiana
