= Steve Pugh (politician) =

American politician (1961–2021)

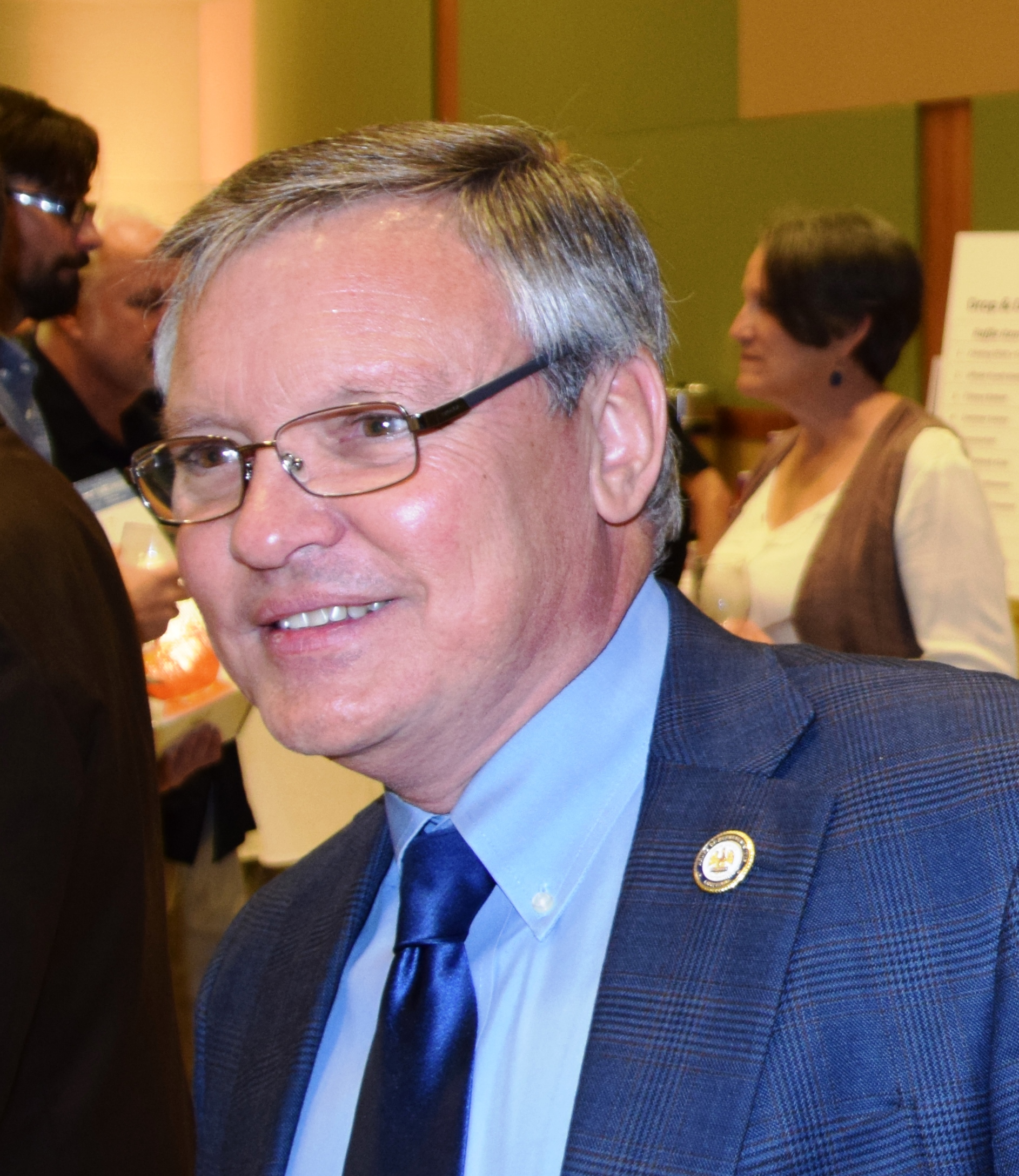
Pugh in 2015

Stephen E. Pugh (April 1, 1961 – September 7, 2021) was an American florist and politician. He served as a member of the Louisiana House of Representatives from 2008 until January 2020 as a member of the Republican Party.

Pugh, a professional florist, was a resident of Ponchatoula, Louisiana. He died on September 7, 2021, at the age of 60.
