= Arcola Presbyterian Church =

Historic church in Louisiana, United States

- U.S. National Register of Historic Places
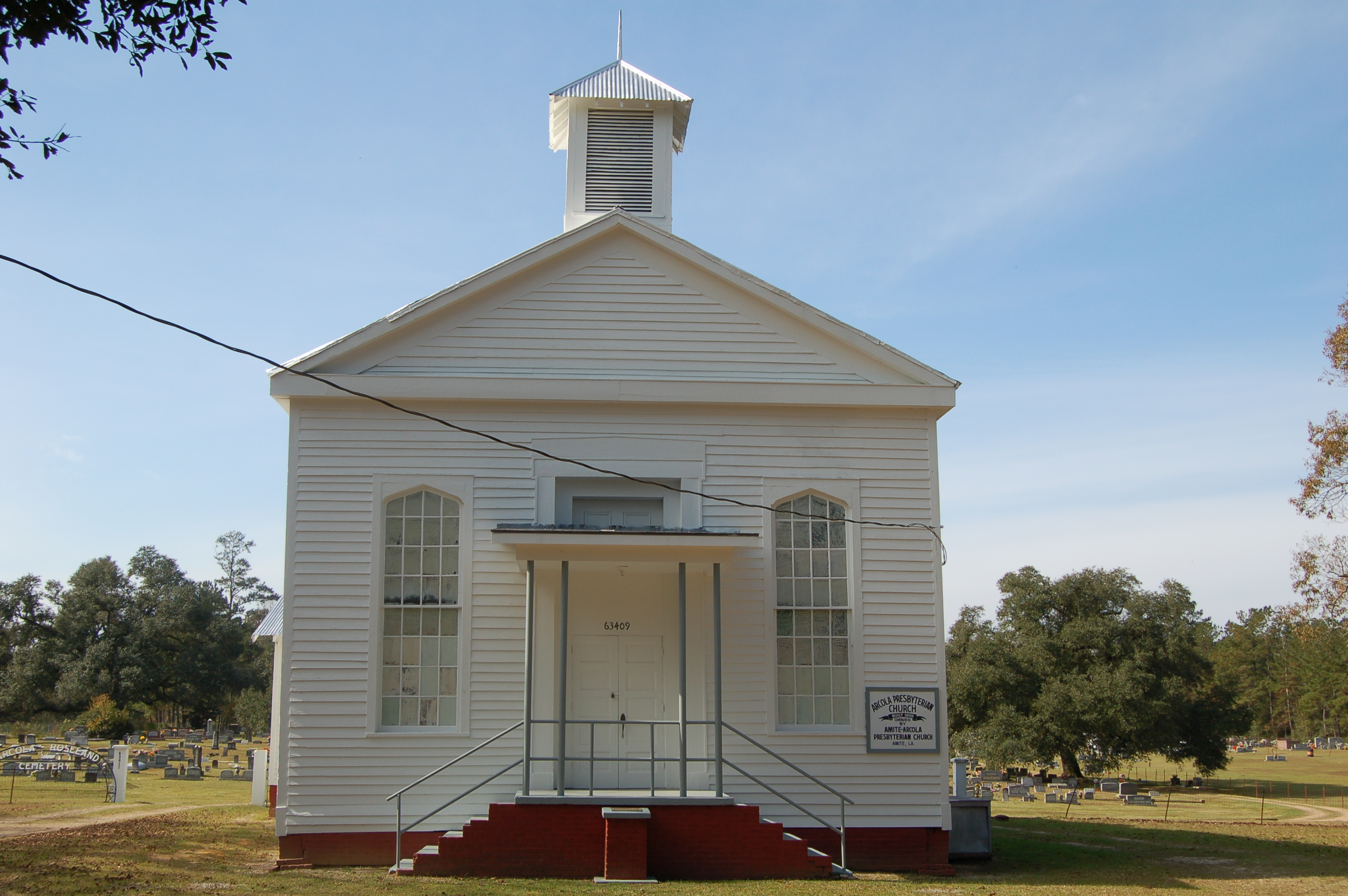

- Location within Louisiana Location within the United States
- Location: Church St.
- Nearest city: Arcola, Louisiana
- Coordinates: 30°46′34″N 90°31′4″W
- Built: 1859
- Architectural style: Greek Revival
- NRHP reference No.: 82000462
- Added to NRHP: October 22, 1982

The Arcola Presbyterian Church is a historic Presbyterian church in Arcola, Louisiana, United States. It was built in 1859 and is of the Greek Revival architectural style. It is owned by the Amite–Arcola Presbyterian Church in Amite, Louisiana. The five-acre property was dedicated in 1859 by John Corkern and John Leonard to promote "Christianity, morality and education under the jurisdiction of the Conference of the Methodist Episcopal Church South."

By 1861 the church was practicing as Presbyterian. In 1897 it became an official Presbyterian church. On June 3, 1964, the property was given to the congregation.

The Arcola church was listed on the National Register of Historic Places in 1982.

== See also ==
- Loranger Methodist Church: also NRHP-listedin in Tangipahoa Parish
- National Register of Historic Places listings in Tangipahoa Parish, Louisiana
