= Tangipahoa, Louisiana =

Village in Louisiana

- Village
- Village of Tangipahoa
- Location of Tangipahoa in Tangipahoa Parish, Louisiana.

- Location of Louisiana in the United States
- Coordinates: 30°52′25″N 90°30′49″W
- Country: United States
- State: Louisiana
- Parish: Tangipahoa
- Founded: c. 1853
- Incorporated: 1866

Area
  - Total: 1.00 sq mi (2.60 km^{2})
  - Land: 1.00 sq mi (2.60 km^{2})
  - Water: 0 sq mi (0.00 km^{2})
- Elevation: 180 ft (55 m)

Population (2020)
  - Total: 425
  - Density: 423.0/sq mi (163.32/km^{2})
- Time zone: UTC-6 (CST)
  - Summer (DST): UTC-5 (CDT)
- Area code: 985
- FIPS code: 22-74760
- GNIS feature ID: 2407558

Tangipahoa is a village in Tangipahoa Parish, Louisiana, United States. The population was 425 at the 2020 census. It was named after the Tangipahoa Native American tribe. Tangipahoa is part of the Hammond MSA.

== Etymology ==
The name Tangipahoa is derived from the Muskogean words (tonche pahoha) which translates to "corncob people" or "people of the corn" or "corncob". It is from this Native American tribe that the modern Tangipahoa Parish gets its name, as well as the Tangipahoa River.

== Geography ==
According to the United States Census Bureau, the village has a total area of 0.9 square miles (2.3 km^{2}), all land.

== Demographics ==
Historical population
Census	Pop.	Note	%±
1870	236		—
1880	259		9.7%
1900	297		—
1910	394		32.7%
1920	252		−36.0%
1930	304		20.6%
1940	319		4.9%
1950	352		10.3%
1960	465		32.1%
1970	469		0.9%
1980	493		5.1%
1990	569		15.4%
2000	747		31.3%
2010	748		0.1%
2020	425		−43.2%
2025 (est.)	456	▲	7.3%
U.S. Decennial Census

Tangipahoa racial composition as of 2020
Race	Number	Percentage
White (non-Hispanic)	34	8.0%
Black or African American (non-Hispanic)	362	85.18%
Native American	1	0.24%
Asian	1	0.24%
Other/Mixed	18	4.24%
Hispanic or Latino	9	2.12%

As of the 2020 United States census, there were 425 people, 190 households, and 119 families residing in the village.

== Notable person ==
- Michael Jackson, NFL player and mayor from 2009 through 2012.

== See also ==
- Green Shutters
- Camp Moore
