= Carter–Gilmer House =

Historic home in Charlottesville, Virginia, United States

- U.S. National Register of Historic Places
- Virginia Landmarks Register
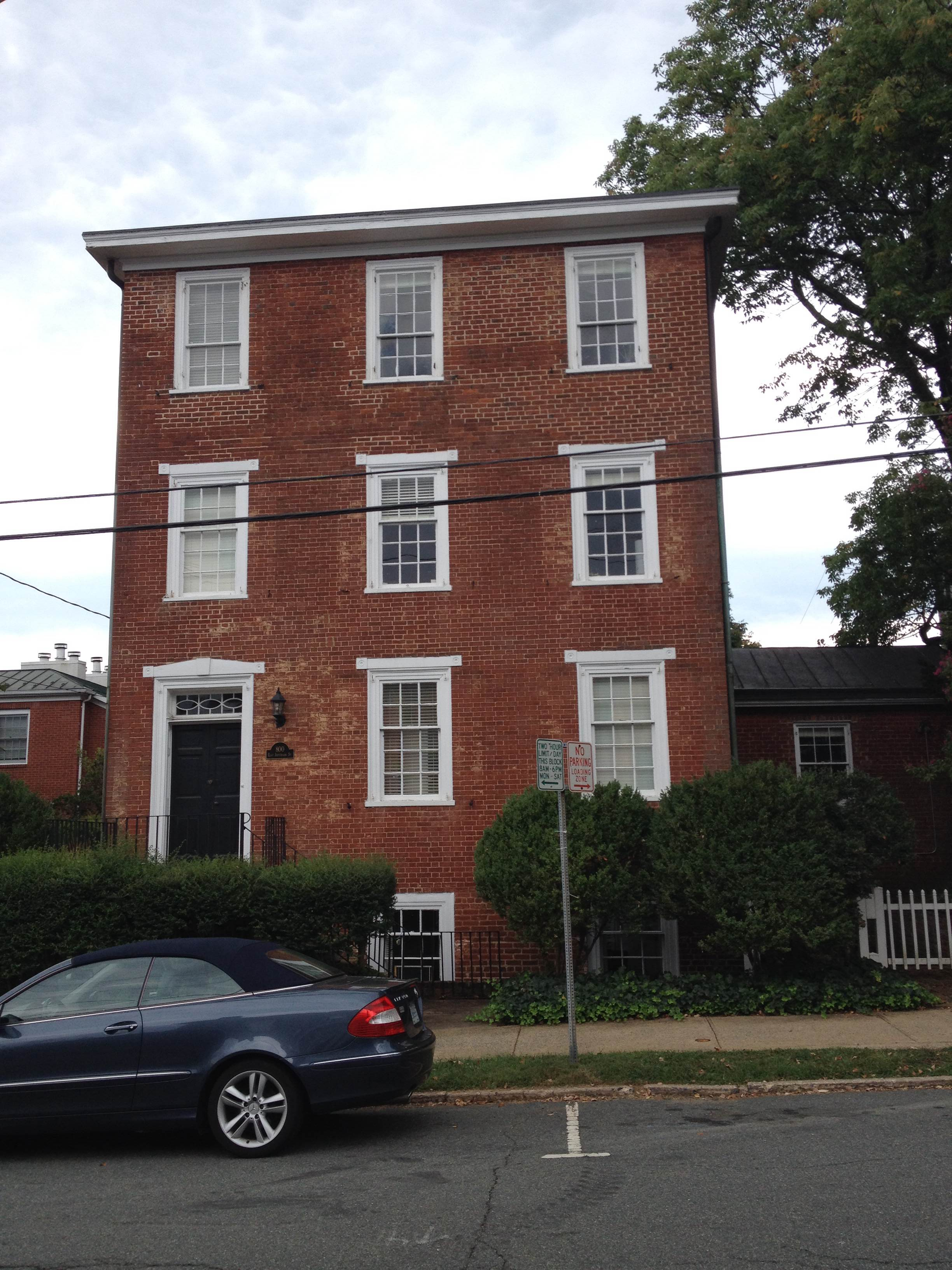

- Location within Virginia Location within the United States
- Location: 802 E. Jefferson St., Charlottesville, Virginia
- Coordinates: 38°1′50″N 78°28′32″W
- Area: less than one acre
- Built: c. 1820
- Architectural style: Federal
- MPS: Charlottesville MRA
- NRHP reference No.: 82001801
- VLR No.: 104-0012

Significant dates
- Added to NRHP: October 21, 1982
- Designated VLR: October 20, 1981

Carter–Gilmer House is a historic home located at Charlottesville, Virginia. It was built about 1820, and is a three-story, three-bay, Federal style brick townhouse dwelling. The house has been divided into apartments.

It was listed on the National Register of Historic Places in 1982.
