= Carter House (Elkader, Iowa) =

Historic house in Iowa, United States

- U.S. National Register of Historic Places
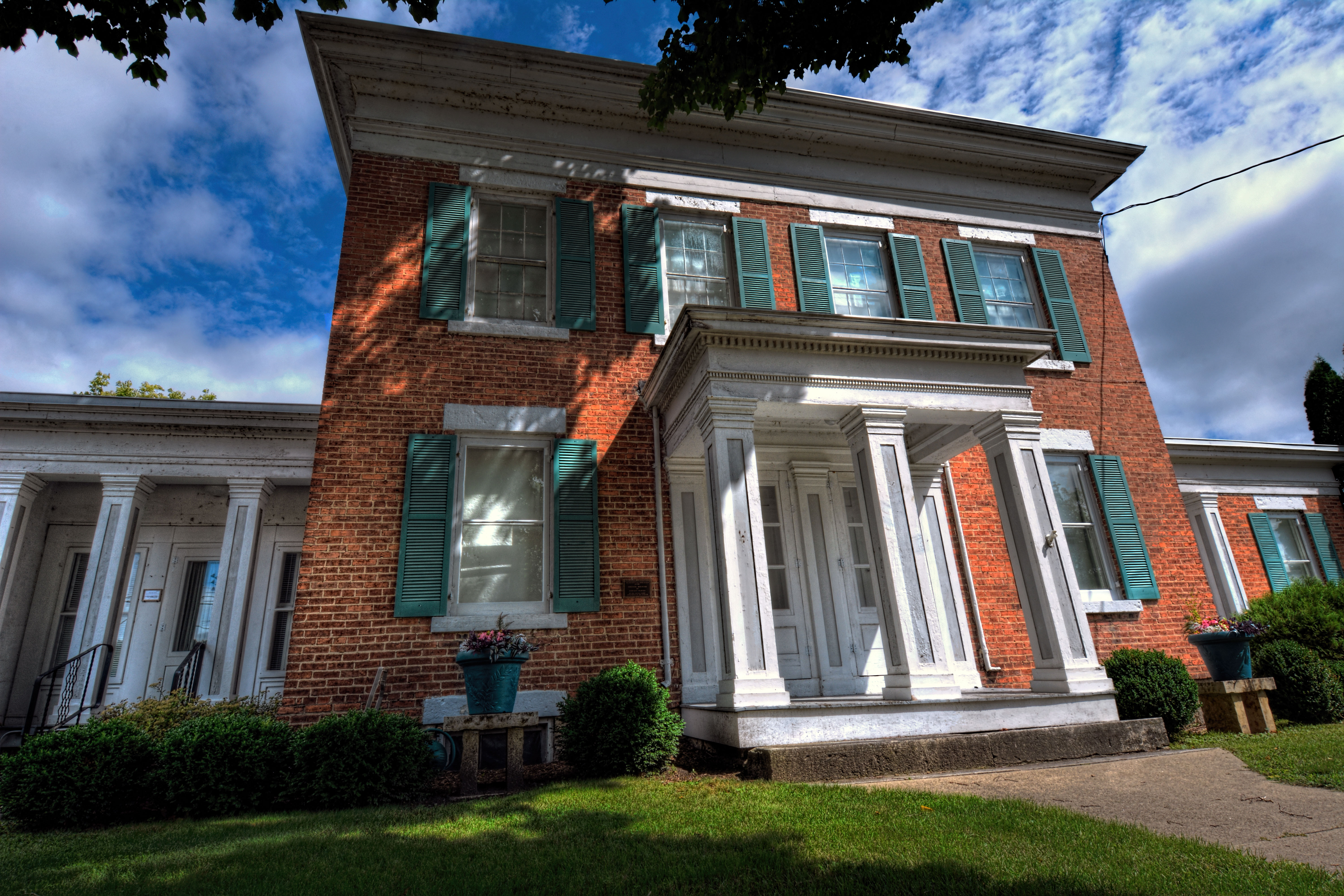

- Location within Iowa Location within the United States
- Interactive map showing the location of Carter House
- Location: 101 High St., SE, Elkader, Iowa
- Coordinates: 42°51′19″N 91°24′9″W
- Built: 1850
- Architectural style: Greek Revival
- NRHP reference No.: 76000744
- Added to NRHP: November 7, 1976

The Carter House Museum in Elkader, Iowa, is a seasonal museum open on Saturdays and Sundays from June through August. It is also known as the W. C. Reimer House, and is a Greek Revival building built in 1855 as a two family dwelling by brothers Elbert (E.V.) and Henry (H. B.) Carter. In 1885 the house was sold to Elkader merchant Joseph Lamm and his wife Ella who retained ownership until 1938 when William C. Reimer and his wife Lina (Stemmer) Reimer purchased the home and property. In 1983, after the death of Mrs. Reimer, the house was sold to the Elkader Historical Society who then went through the house and grounds over a two year period to restore it to museum quality. In 1985 the house was opened to limited tours and eventually expanded to open tours on a regular schedule. In 1993 the annex was built to house the large number of donated items from Elkader's rich history. It is a spacious facility with many displays of the various historical artifacts of Elkader and its people.

It was listed on the National Register of Historic Places (NRHP) in 1976. Its 1975 NRHP nomination document calls it a "lovely Greek Revival home" which "contributes substantially to the historic ambience of Elkader", having greater effect due to its location across from the historic Clayton County Courthouse. As of 1975, it was relatively unaltered, besides having plumbing and electric service added.

In 2016, it is operated as a 19th-century period historic house museum by the Elkader Historical Society.
