= Carter House (Versailles, Kentucky) =

- U.S. National Register of Historic Places
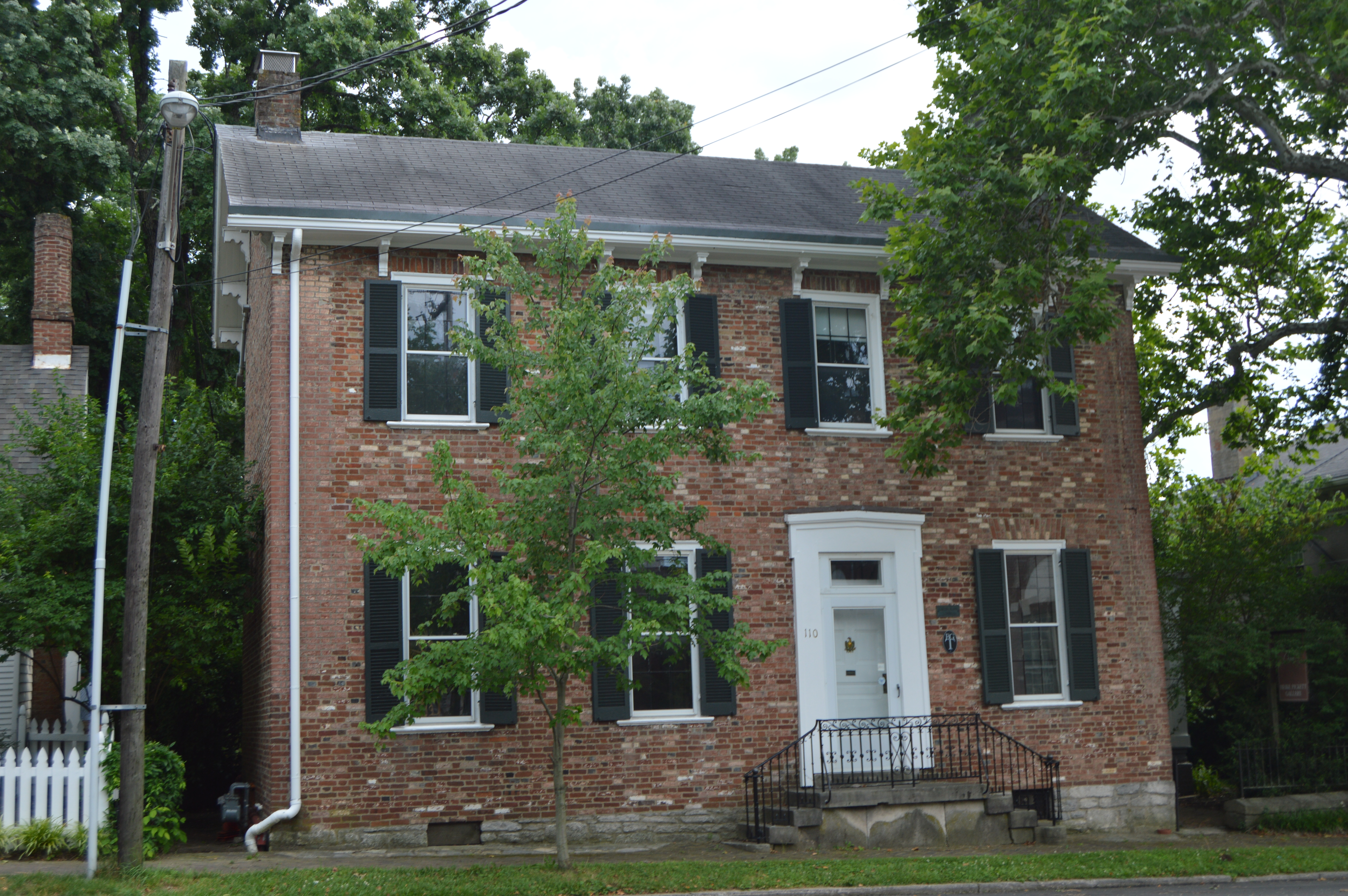

- Location within Kentucky Location within the United States
- Location: 110 Morgan St., Versailles, Kentucky
- Coordinates: 38°03′05″N 84°43′48″W
- Area: 0.3 acres (0.12 ha)
- Built: c.1792, c.1816
- NRHP reference No.: 75000843
- Added to NRHP: May 2, 1975

The Carter House, at 110 Morgan St. in Versailles, Kentucky, was built in 1792. It was listed on the National Register of Historic Places in 1975.

It is a two-story brick L-shaped house built in the first year or so from when the town was platted. Its front section was built before 1816.

The listing included one contributing buildings and one contributing structures.
