= Ponchatoula Commercial Historic District =

- U.S. National Register of Historic Places
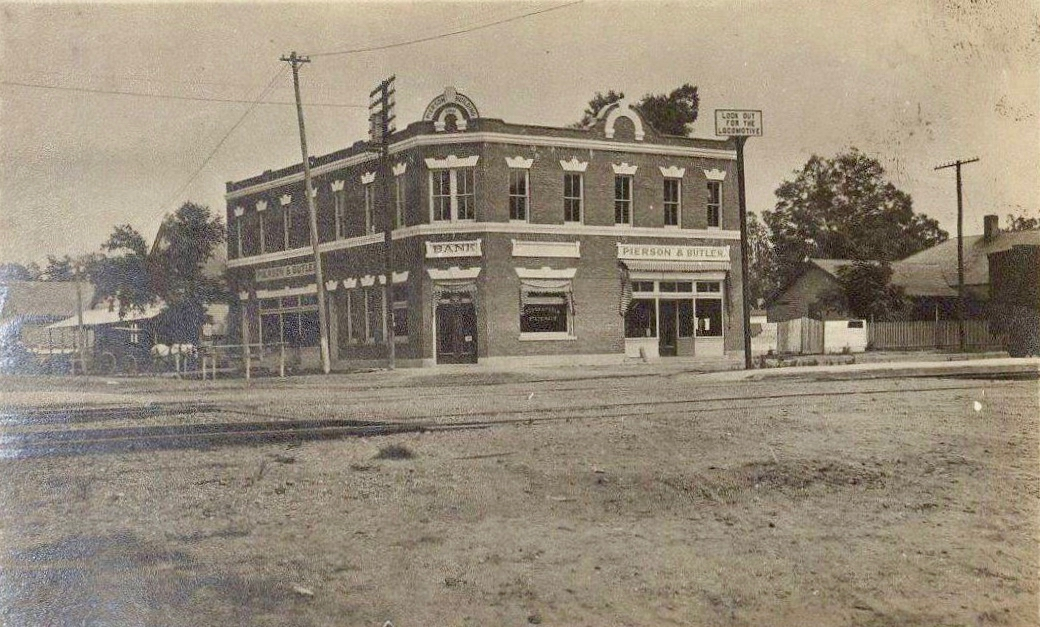
- The Ponchatoula bank in the year 1912

- Location within Louisiana
- Nearest city: Ponchatoula
- Coordinates: 30°26′19″N 90°26′32″W
- Built: 1890-1931
- NRHP reference No.: 82000466
- Added to NRHP: October 5, 1982

The Ponchatoula Commercial Historic District in Ponchatoula, Tangipahoa Parish, Louisiana, was listed on the National Register of Historic Places in 1982. Eleven of the early 20th century buildings have been determined to be historically significant.

The following is an excerpt from the National Register of Historic Places nomination:

The Pine Street corridor between Railroad Avenue and Sixth Street is, within the context of the Florida Parishes, a superior example of a small town, turn-of-the-century commercial zone. In fact, it is one of the two finest examples in the Florida Parishes. The other is the Hammond Historic District. The district is significant within the context of Tangipahoa Parish in the areas of commerce and agriculture because its contributing elements reflect Ponchatoula's role as a center of strawberry production, an industry of crucial importance in the agricultural and commercial history of the parish. The buildings in question contributed to and were a reflection of the prosperity generated by King Strawberry.

— Robert B, DeBlieux, State Historic Preservation Officer, "National Register of Historic Places Inventory – Nomination Form", August 18, 1982
