= Carter–Terry–Call House =

Historic residence in Orem, Utah, United States

- U.S. National Register of Historic Places
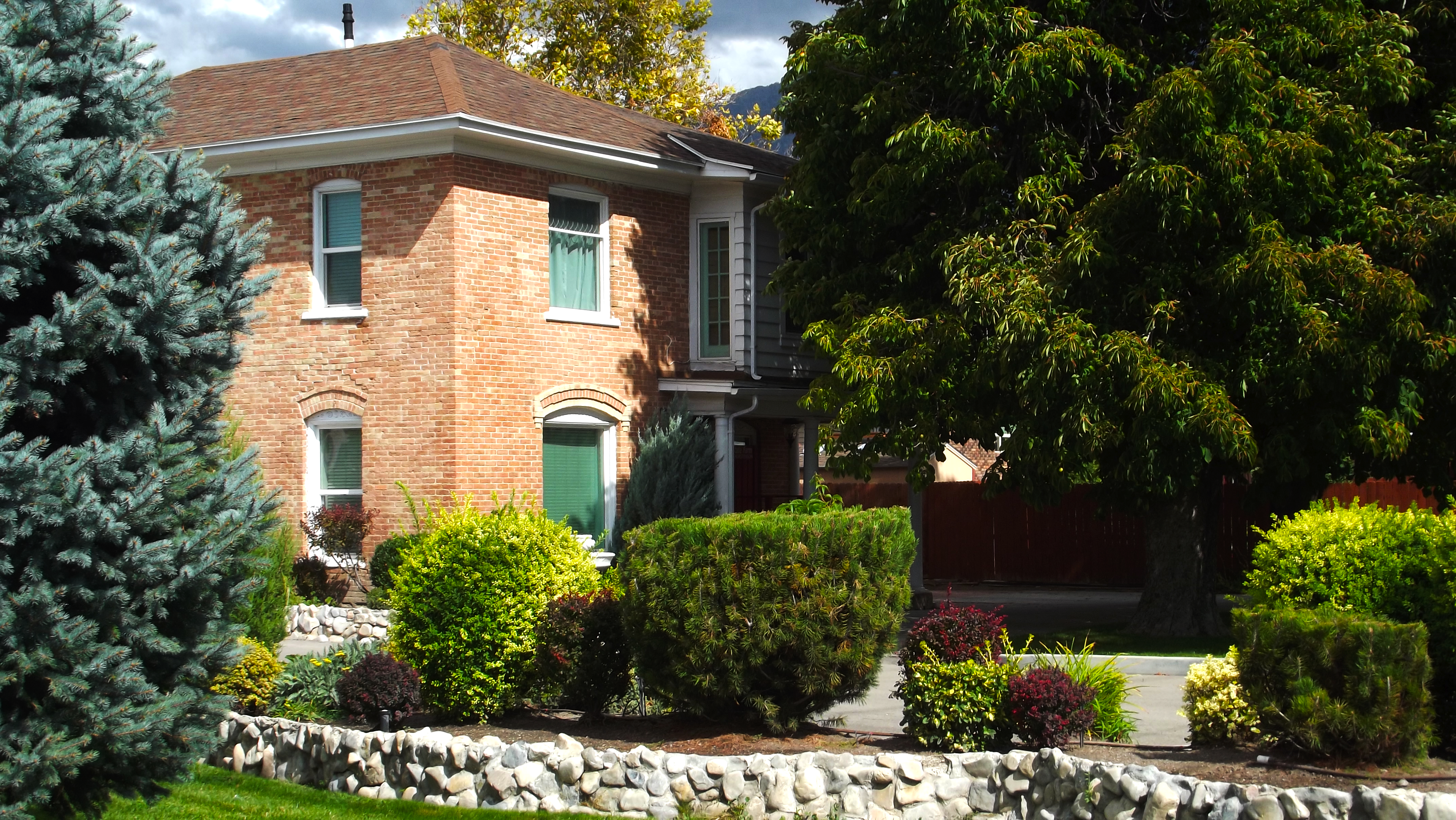
- Carter–Terry–Call House, September 2019

- Location within Utah Location within the United States
- Location: 815 East 800 South; Orem, Utah; United States
- Coordinates: 40°16′57″N 111°40′31″W
- Area: 0.4 acres (0.16 ha)
- Built: 1899
- Architectural style: Late Victorian
- MPS: Orem, Utah MPS
- NRHP reference No.: 98000658
- Added to NRHP: June 11, 1998

The Carter–Terry–Call House is a historic residence in Orem, Utah, United States, that is listed on the National Register of Historic Places (NRHP).

== Description ==
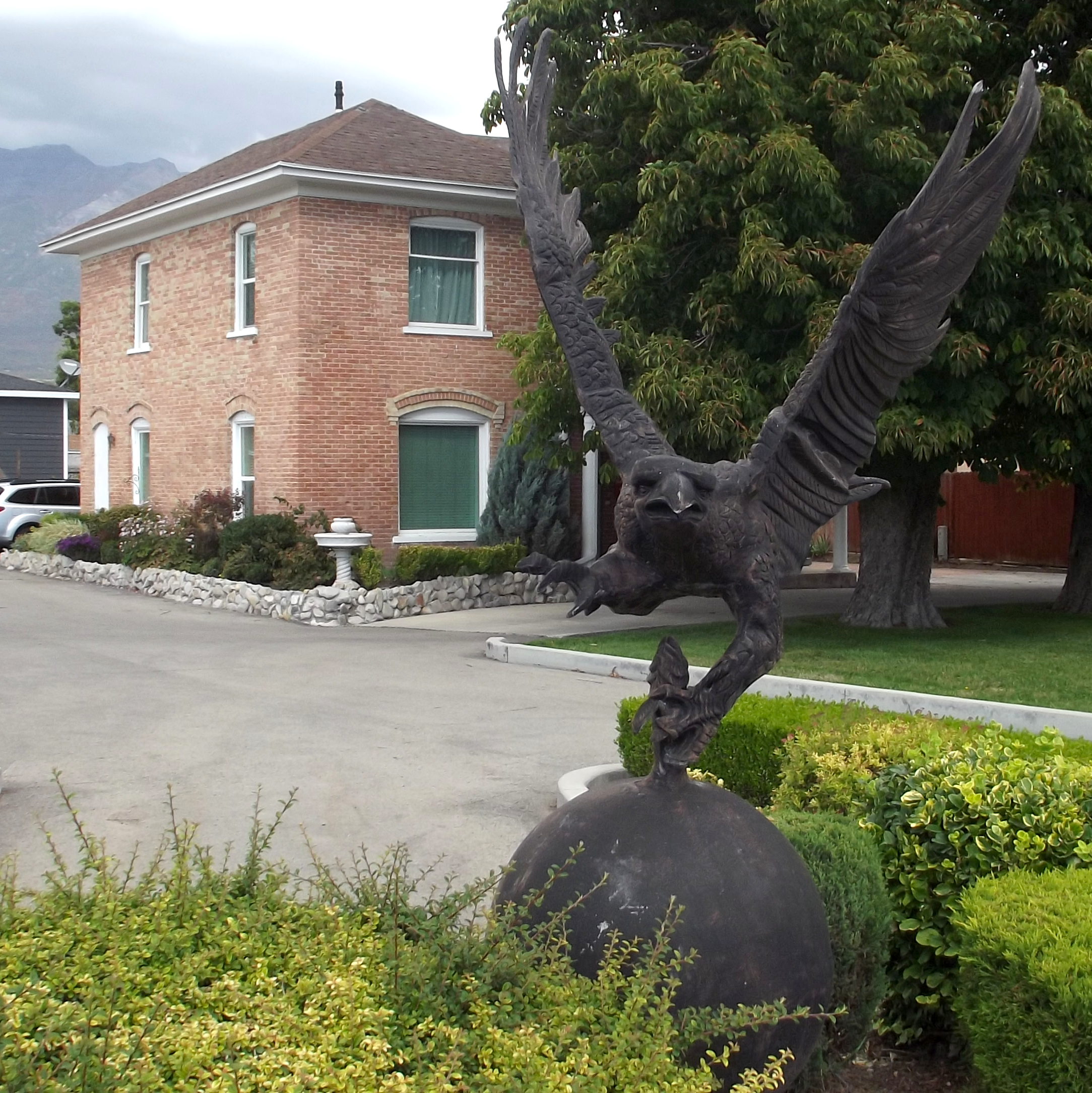
Alternate view of the Carter-Terry-Call House, September 2019

The house is located at 815 East 800 South and is believed to have been built in 1899.

According to its NRHP nomination, the house reflects the evolution of Orem during 1899 to 1941. The person of greatest significance associated with the house is Otis Terry, Jr., who was a religious leader and a civic leader. He was the "second Bishop of the Timpanogos Ward (parish) which then embodied almost the entire Provo Bench. The size and style of the house exemplify the importance of the bishop....".

The house is believed to have been built by Richard Carter, who owned the property for about 10 years. It was then a home of Otis Terry, Jr., for his third wife. Terry actually had served part of a nine-month prison sentence during 1889-1890 for polygamy, relating to his having been married to two previous wives; but his first wife died in 1899 and it is believed that the second had left him, leaving him with 13 children to raise, before he married the third in 1900, and moved to Orem and purchased this house in 1901. Terry became bishop in 1903. The house was bought by Orvis J. Call in 1917.

It was listed on the NRHP June 11, 1998.

== See also ==
- National Register of Historic Places listings in Utah County, Utah
