= Green Shutters =

- Formerly listed on the U.S. National Register of Historic Places
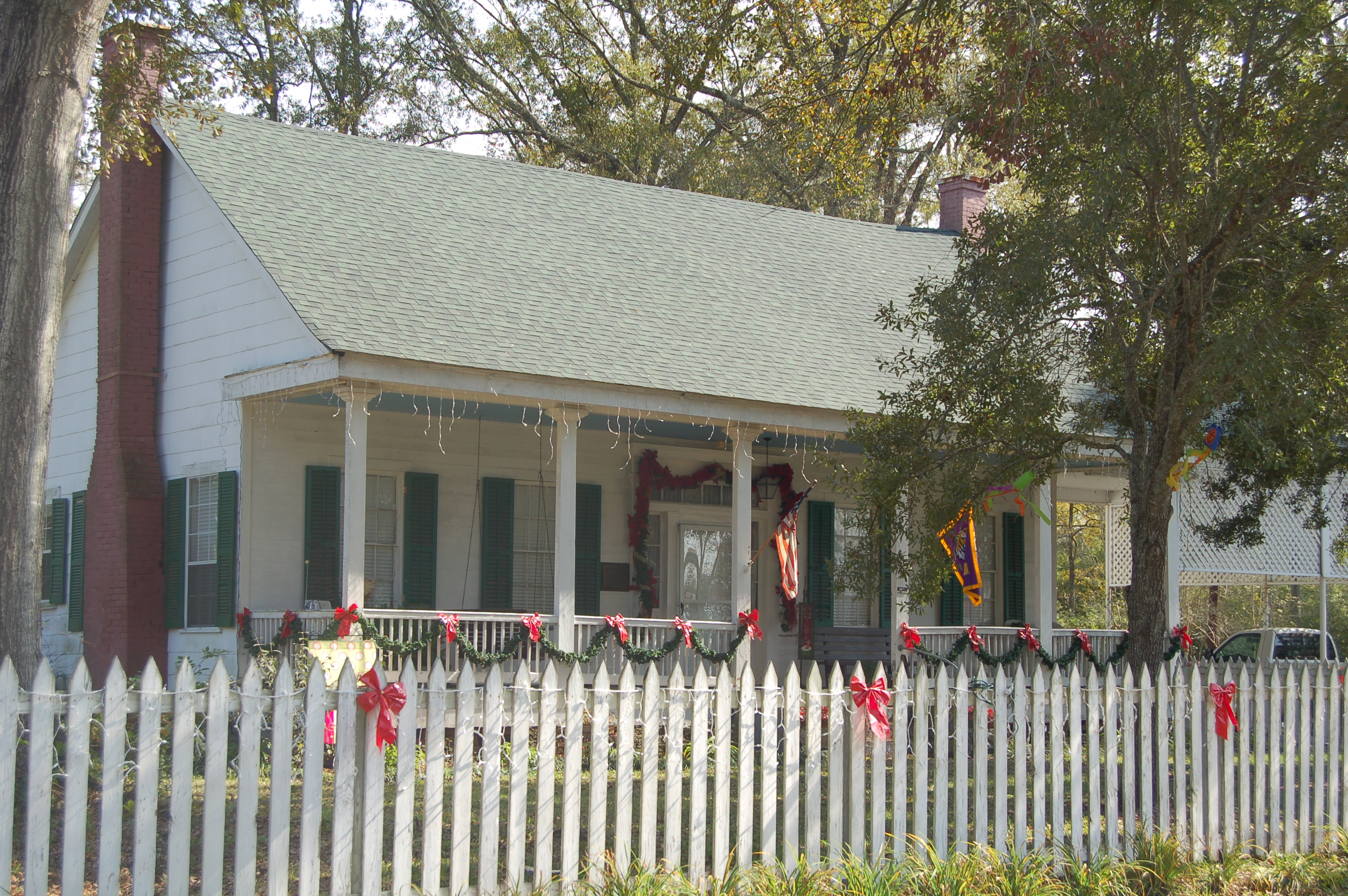

- Location within Louisiana Location within the United States
- Location: Franklin St., Tangipahoa, Louisiana
- Coordinates: 30°52′25″N 90°30′33″W
- Area: 0.3 acres (0.12 ha)
- Built: c. 1850
- Architectural style: Greek Revival
- NRHP reference No.: 82002797

Significant dates
- Added to NRHP: August 11, 1982
- Removed from NRHP: March 19, 2024

Green Shutters, on Franklin St. in Tangipahoa, Louisiana, was built around 1850. It includes Greek Revival style. It was listed on the National Register of Historic Places in 1982, and was delisted in 2024.

It is the only known raised Greek Revival cottage in Tangipahoa Parish.

It is said that Confederate soldiers from Camp Moore recuperated here; it was bought in 1900 by family physician Dr. John W. Lambert, who lived in the house until his death in 1931.
