= Carter Mansion =

Historic house in Massachusetts, United States

- U.S. National Register of Historic Places
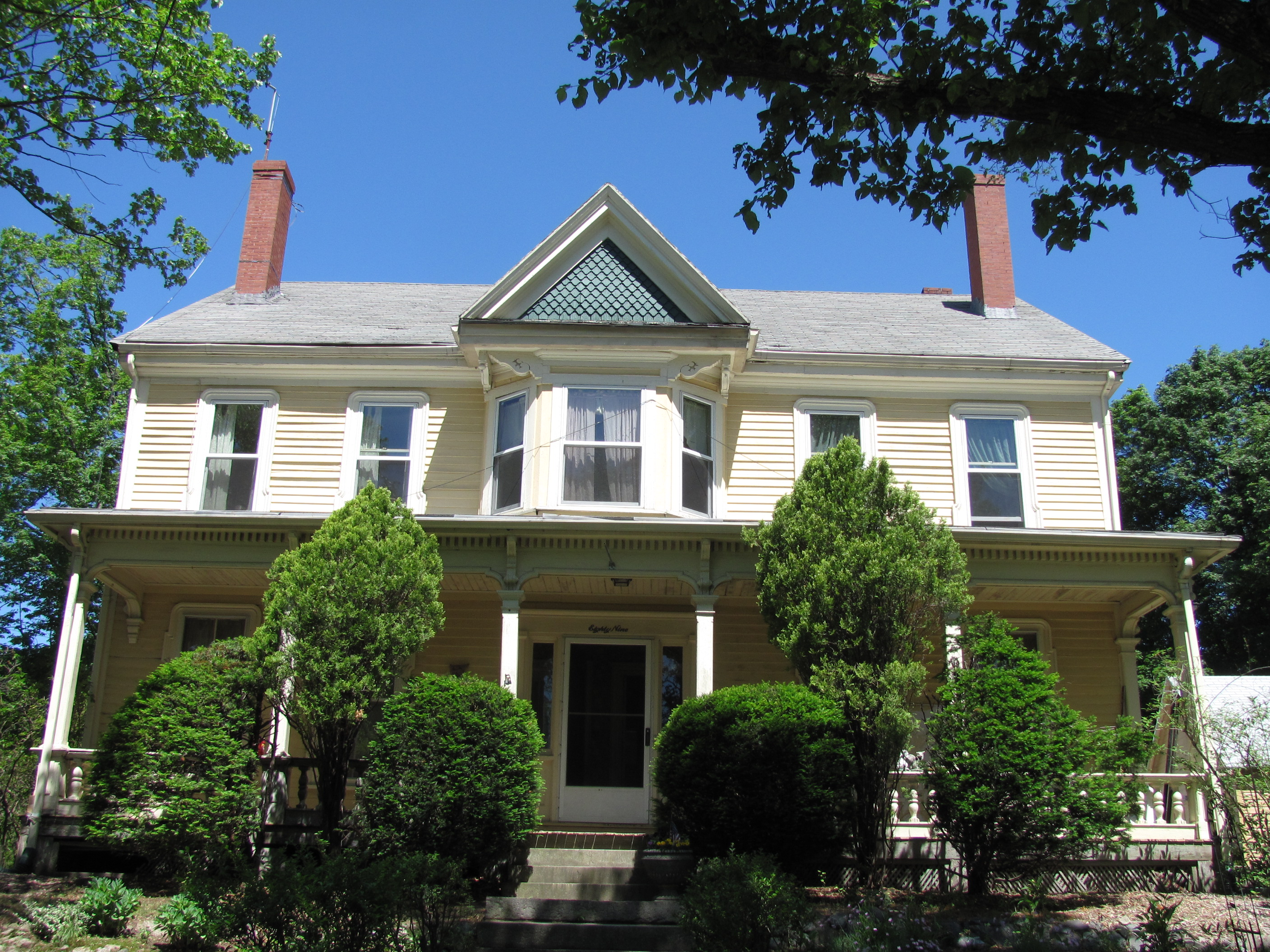
- Carter Mansion

- Location within Massachusetts Location within the United States
- Location: 89 Woburn Street, Reading, Massachusetts
- Coordinates: 42°31′24″N 71°6′31″W
- Built: 1802
- Architectural style: Italianate, Federal
- MPS: Reading MRA
- NRHP reference No.: 84002535
- Added to NRHP: July 19, 1984

The Carter Mansion is a historic house located in Reading, Massachusetts.

== Description and history ==
The 2 1/2-story wood-frame house was built in 1802 by Daniel Chute, owner of one of the first shoemaking businesses in Reading. Originally a Federal style building, it was successively refashioned during the 19th century as architectural tastes changed. In the 1850s it was modified with Italianate styling with the addition of carved window surrounds and the bracketed porch. In the 1870s the central gable was added to the front facade, giving the house a Queen Anne flavor. Around the same time an addition was added to the rear of the house. These later works were done by William Carter, son of Samuel Carter, owner of a local steam-powered mill who had married into the Chute family. The younger Carter had the family name engraved into the granite stairs at the front of the property.

The house was listed on the National Register of Historic Places in 1984.

== See also ==
- National Register of Historic Places listings in Reading, Massachusetts
- National Register of Historic Places listings in Middlesex County, Massachusetts
