= Carter Farm =

Historic house in West Virginia, United States

- U.S. National Register of Historic Places
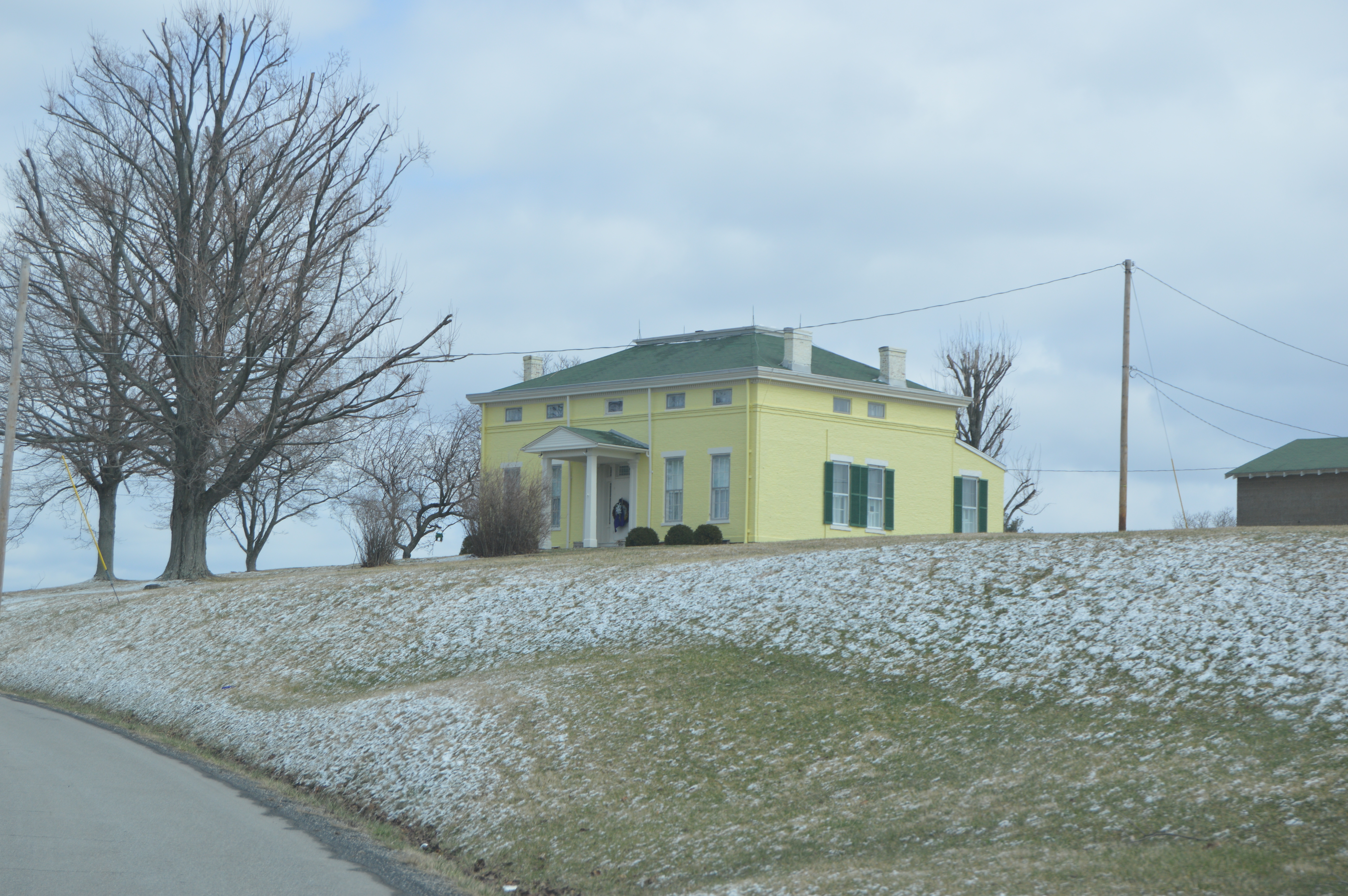
- Roadside view of the farmhouse

- Location within West Virginia Location within the United States
- Location: Boggs Hill Rd., near Wheeling, West Virginia
- Coordinates: 40°5′9″N 80°39′26″W
- Area: 63 acres (25 ha)
- Architect: D.W. Gibson
- Architectural style: Greek Revival
- NRHP reference No.: 83003248
- Added to NRHP: August 18, 1983

Carter Farm, also known as "Everbreeze," is a historic house and farm located near West Liberty, Ohio County, West Virginia. The main house was built between 1848 and 1852, and is a 1 1/2-story brick residence in the Greek Revival style. It features a hipped roof and symmetrical facade. The original portico was replaced in 1946. Also on the property are a one-story, gabled-roof masonry slave quarters; a masonry, outdoor detached kitchen; the "Wool House," built in 1819; and a large, 2 1/2-story barn.

It was listed on the National Register of Historic Places in 1983.
