= Carter–Swain House =

Historic house in North Carolina, United States

- U.S. National Register of Historic Places
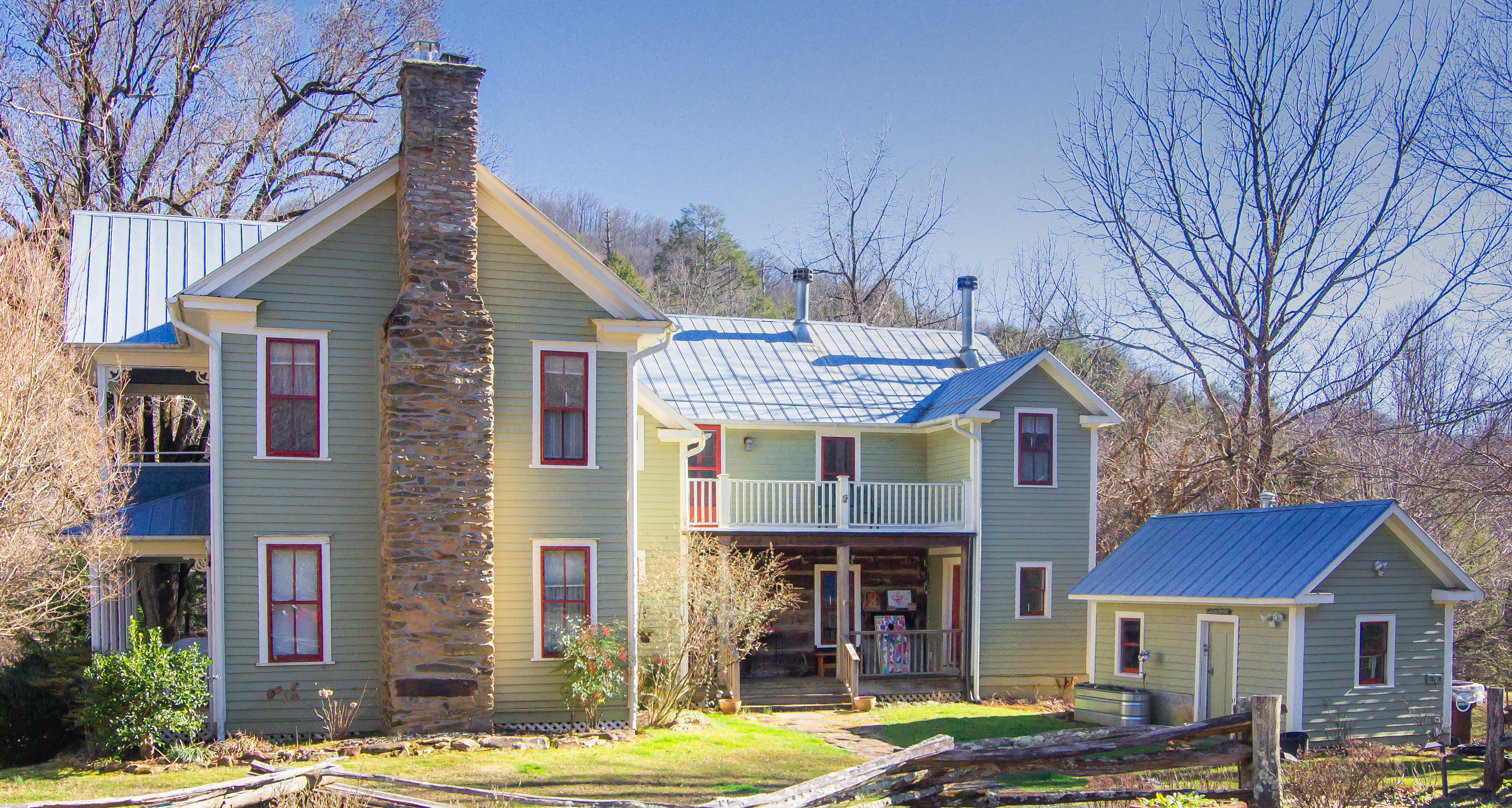

- Location within North Carolina Location within the United States
- Location: E side SR 2162, N of jct. with SR 2163, near Democrat, North Carolina
- Coordinates: 35°47′24″N 82°29′31″W
- Area: 8.7 acres (3.5 ha)
- Built: c. 1849
- NRHP reference No.: 87001114
- Added to NRHP: July 2, 1987

Carter–Swain House is a historic home located near Democrat, Buncombe County, North Carolina. The original section was built about 1849, and is a two-story, log house measuring 15 feet by 17 feet. It was later expanded, and is a two-story weatherboarded structure with two-tiered porches and a rear ell. Also on the property is a contributing four-pen log barn. The house functioned as a roadside inn during the late-19th century.

It was listed on the National Register of Historic Places in 1987.
