= Carter House (Hammond, Louisiana) =

- U.S. National Register of Historic Places
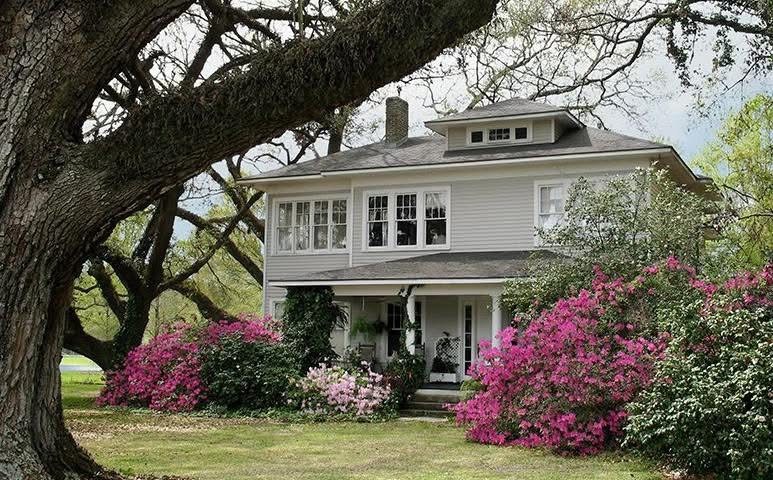

- Location within Louisiana
- Nearest city: Hammond, Louisiana
- Coordinates: 30°28′31″N 90°29′33″W
- Area: 0.3 acres (0.12 ha)
- Built: c.1925
- Architectural style: Bungalow/craftsman
- NRHP reference No.: 82002796
- Added to NRHP: August 11, 1982

The Carter House, in Tangipahoa Parish, Louisiana near Hammond, Louisiana, was built around 1925. It was listed on the National Register of Historic Places in 1982.

Its National Register nomination describes it as a "two-story frame house built 'along bungalow lines.' It is located in a rural setting near Hammond. The house has been altered very little since its construction, and consequently it still conveys the full measure of its historical associations."

It was deemed "significant in the area of education because of its close association with Will Carter, one of the founders of Southeastern College (presently the Southeastern Louisiana University). Will Carter built the house c.1925 and lived there until his death in 1955." It was also deemed "significant in the areas of communications and politics/government because Will Carter's Pulitzer Prize winning son, Hodding Carter, lived there in 1932 when he founded the Hammond Daily Courier, which proved to be a relentless local foe of Huey Long."

It is located about 1.5 miles (2.4 km) south of Hammond on Happywoods Rd.
