= Cate House (Hammond, Louisiana) =

- U.S. National Register of Historic Places
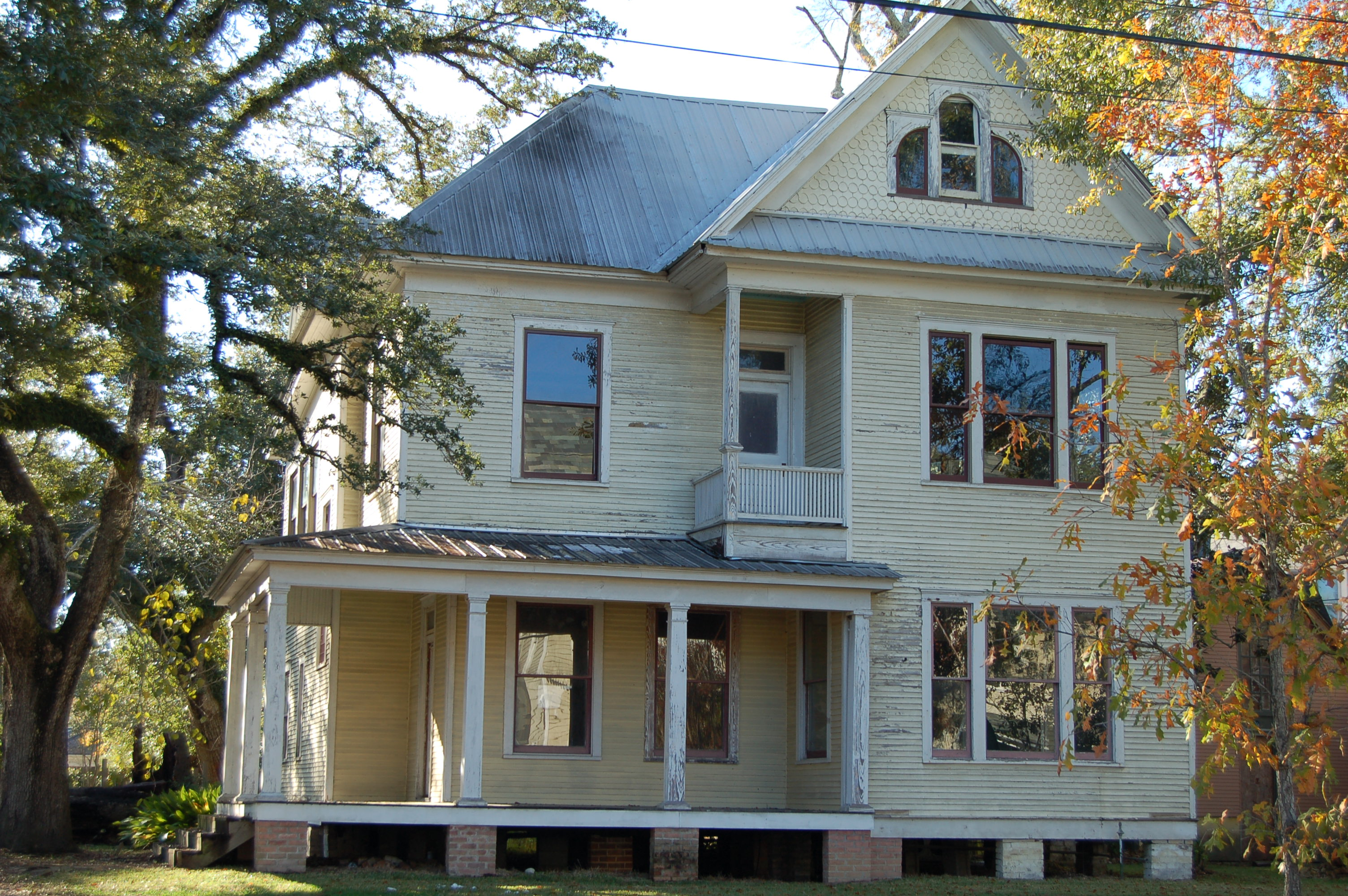

- Location within Louisiana
- Location: 111 N. Magnolia St., Hammond, Louisiana
- Coordinates: 30°30′14″N 90°27′50″W
- Area: less than one acre
- Built: c.1900
- Architectural style: Queen Anne, Colonial Revival
- NRHP reference No.: 98000571
- Added to NRHP: May 20, 1998

The Cate House, at 111 N. Magnolia St. in Hammond, Louisiana, was built around 1900. It was listed on the National Register of Historic Places in 1998.

It is a 2 1/2-story frame house which is mainly Queen Anne in style but also includes elements of Colonial Revival. It was under renovation in 1998.
