= Ponchatoula, Louisiana =

City in Louisiana

- City
- City of Ponchatoula
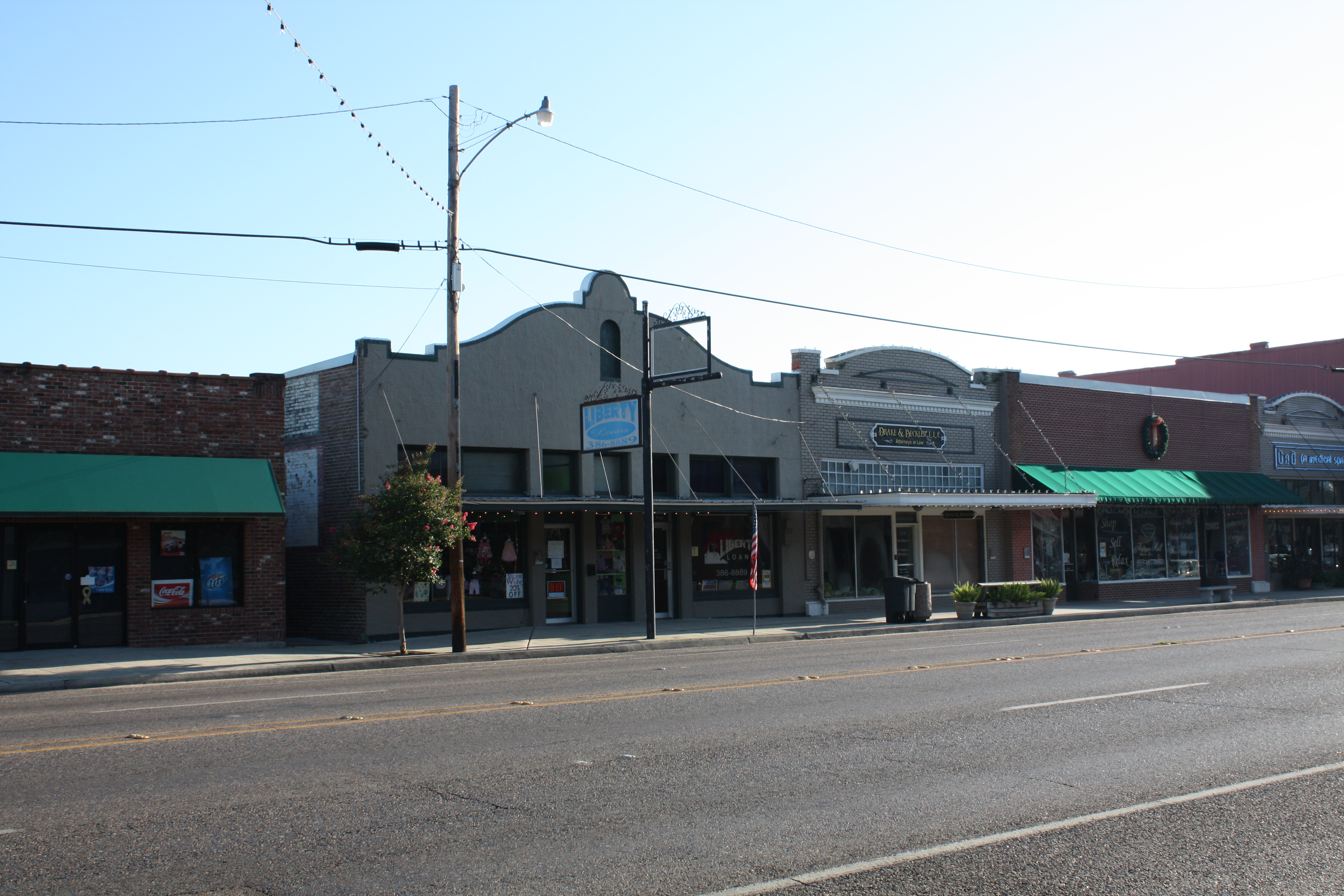
- Downtown Ponchatoula

- Location of Ponchatoula in Tangipahoa Parish, Louisiana.

- Location of Louisiana in the United States
- Coordinates: 30°26′25″N 90°26′33″W
- Country: United States
- State: Louisiana
- Parish: Tangipahoa

Government
  - Mayor: Robert F. Zabbia

Area
  - Total: 4.74 sq mi (12.27 km^{2})
  - Land: 4.73 sq mi (12.26 km^{2})
  - Water: 0.0039 sq mi (0.01 km^{2})
- Elevation: 26 ft (7.9 m)

Population (2020)
  - Total: 7,822
  - Density: 1,653/sq mi (638.2/km^{2})
- Time zone: UTC−6 (CST)
  - Summer (DST): UTC−5 (CDT)
- ZIP code: 70454
- Area code: 985
- FIPS code: 22-61615
- GNIS feature ID: 2404548
- Website: City of Ponchatoula, Louisiana

Ponchatoula is the second-largest city in Tangipahoa Parish, Louisiana. The population was 6,559 at the 2010 census and 7,545 at the time of the 2020 population estimates program.

== Etymology ==
It is speculated that the name is derived from the Choctaw words Pashi meaning "hair" and perhaps itula or itola meaning "to fall" or "to hang" or "flowing" in the Choctaw language.

== History ==
The city of Ponchatoula was founded when the railroad from Jackson, Mississippi to New Orleans was constructed through this area in the 1850s. The New Orleans, Jackson and Great Northern Railroad Company hired an experienced civil engineer, James B. Clarke (ca. 1809–1861) to survey the projected railroad route, establish railroad depot sites, buy timber for bridges and railroad ties, and do the other tasks necessary to construct the railroad.

Finding that there was an unclaimed section of land north of the Manchac swamp, Clarke located a railroad depot near the first dry land after leaving the swamp. Mr. Clarke purchased this one square mile section of land from the state of Louisiana in two installments in December 1852 and January 1853. He surveyed this land and laid out a town in 1853 using the familiar grid system with streets running east–west named for native trees, and north–south streets numbered one through nine. He called his new development "Ponchatoula" after the Ponchatoula River located a couple of miles west of the new settlement. Ponchatoula is a Choctaw word meaning "hanging hair" referring to the beautiful Spanish moss which drapes many of the local trees.

James Clarke began selling town lots, and soon several stores and dozens of homes were built nearby. Ponchatoula grew as new settlers moved here to be near the railroad line, "a new avenue of commerce." The small town was incorporated by the Louisiana legislature in February 1861. A few months after the incorporation of the town, the Civil War began with serious consequences for the community. Because Ponchatoula was located on the vital railroad line, military engagements happened here in September 1862 and March 1863. During the war, stores and some homes were looted, the train depot burned, and livestock killed and stolen.

When the war ended, the railroad line was repaired, a new train depot constructed, and tranquility returned to the little piney woods community. Through the following decades the town's population slowly grew with lumbering and agriculture being the primary local industries. Around 1900, the strawberry industry began to flourish and Ponchatoula became an important shipping point for strawberries and vegetables. Hundreds of refrigerated railroad cars left Ponchatoula each spring loaded with strawberries for the northern markets.

The Ponchatoula community changed completely in 1921 when two large cypress lumbering companies located at the south edge of town. Hundreds of mill workers and their families arrived and the economy prospered with the increased population. The 1920s saw the construction of a new city hall and fire station, a new high school, a modern theater, improved street and municipal services, and dozens of new businesses. The prosperity of the 1920s ebbed as the hard times of the Depression arrived with the closing of the two lumber mills in 1929, and continued through the 1930s mirroring the national economic crisis. Ponchatoula's economy was aided during the Depression by the flourishing strawberry industry and the reopening of a cypress lumber company on one of the former mill sites.

Strawberry workers in nearby Hammond playing poker, 1939.

During World War II, Ponchatoula stepped up and actively supported the war effort. Hundreds of local men and women entered the armed forces, war bond drives and several scrap drives were held, along with other war related activities. A scrap drive led by the local school children yielded a vast amount of iron needed to produce the weapons of war. The community's outstanding contribution to the war effort was recognized when the Navy launched an oil tanker named the USS Ponchatoula, which served in the Pacific. This vessel was scrapped after the war, but a new and much larger oil tanker was built in the 1950s and also named the USS Ponchatoula. The new vessel served with distinction for many years.

Ponchatoula continued to grow in the post war years and the economy became more diversified and less connected to the strawberry and lumbering industries.

In recent years Ponchatoula has become a tourist destination with an unusual historic district, and was designated as "America's Antique City." The community hosts the well-known Strawberry Festival, which attracts many thousands of visitors every April.

=== Early 20th century ===
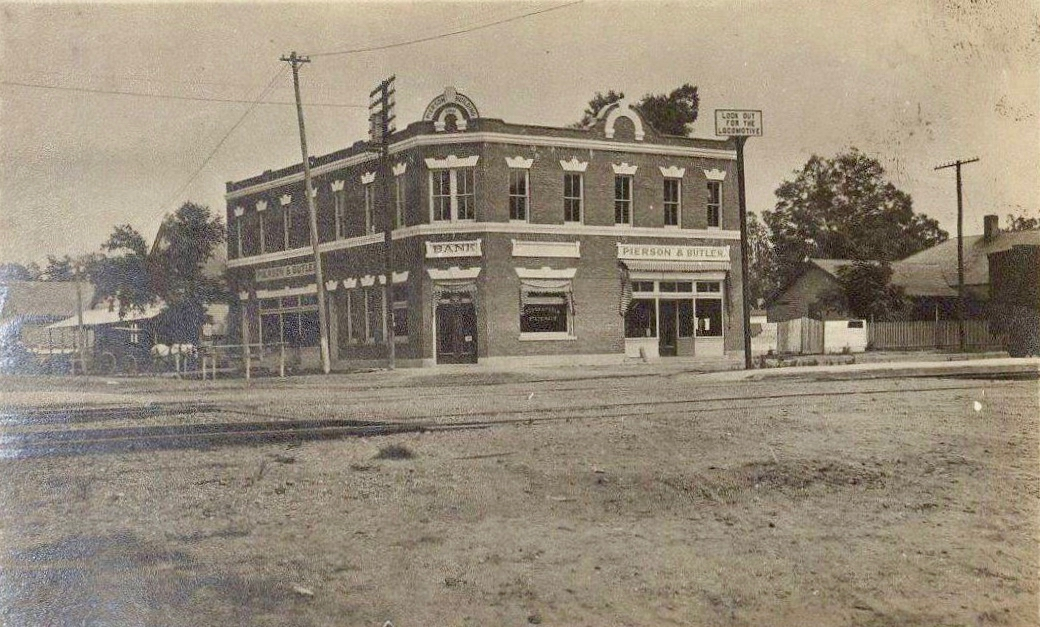
The Ponchatoula bank in the year 1912

The train depot which was destroyed during the Civil War was rebuilt in 1895 as the area began to recover from the Civil War. At the turn of the 20th century Ponchatoula began to transform from the lumber industry into a commercial farming community. The main street began filling up with beautiful brick buildings as shops, banks and restaurants were built to accommodate the growing population. The main crop grown by the local farmers was the strawberry. Many of the families who were major farmers during this era, which lasted about eighty years, have their last names engraved on a large plaque in front of city hall.

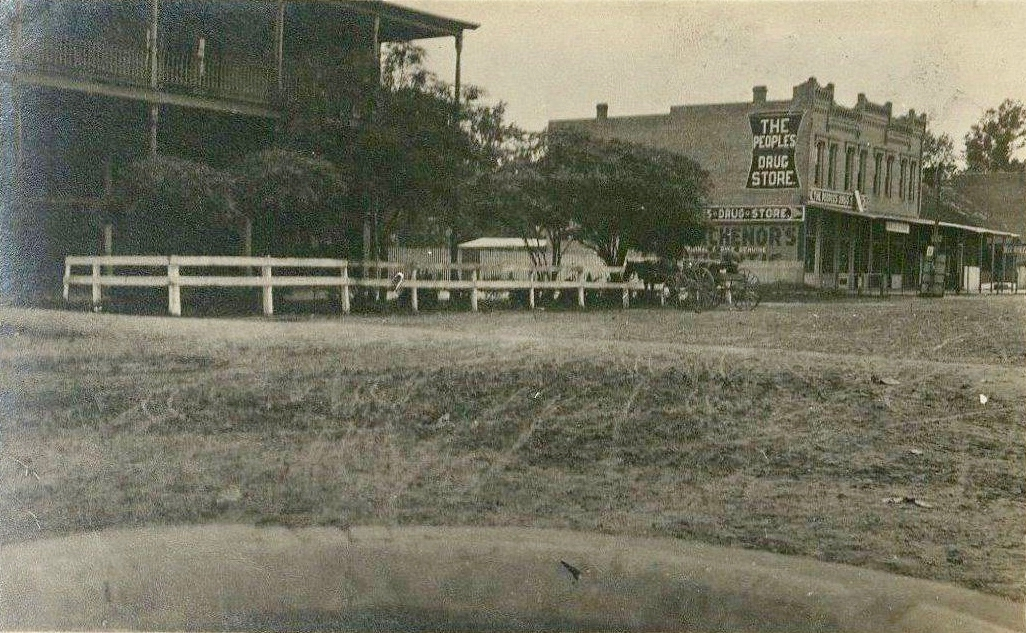
The Peoples Drug Store in the year 1912

== Geography ==
Ponchatoula is located at an elevation of 26 feet (7.9 m). According to the United States Census Bureau, the city has a total area of 4.2 square miles (11 km^{2}), all land.

Ponchatoula is located along Interstate 55 and Louisiana Highway 22, equidistant from New Orleans and Baton Rouge. In the early 1900s, Ponchatoula was one of only two ways to reach New Orleans by land, thus earning the moniker "Gateway to New Orleans."

== Demographics ==
Historical population
| Census | Pop. | Note | %± |
|---|---|---|---|
| 1870 | 320 | | — |
| 1880 | 293 | | −8.4% |
| 1890 | 459 | | 56.7% |
| 1900 | 711 | | 54.9% |
| 1910 | 1,055 | | 48.4% |
| 1920 | 955 | | −9.5% |
| 1930 | 2,898 | | 203.5% |
| 1940 | 4,001 | | 38.1% |
| 1950 | 4,090 | | 2.2% |
| 1960 | 4,727 | | 15.6% |
| 1970 | 4,545 | | −3.9% |
| 1980 | 5,469 | | 20.3% |
| 1990 | 5,425 | | −0.8% |
| 2000 | 5,180 | | −4.5% |
| 2010 | 6,559 | | 26.6% |
| 2020 | 7,822 | | 19.3% |
| 2025 (est.) | 7,755 | ▼ | −0.9% |
U.S. Decennial Census

Ponchatoula racial composition as of 2020
| Race | Number | Percentage |
|---|---|---|
| White (non-Hispanic) | 4,799 | 61.35% |
| Black or African American (non-Hispanic) | 2,267 | 28.98% |
| Native American | 32 | 0.41% |
| Asian | 52 | 0.66% |
| Pacific Islander | 3 | 0.04% |
| Other/Mixed | 308 | 3.94% |
| Hispanic or Latino | 361 | 4.62% |

As of the 2020 United States census, there were 7,822 people, 2,863 households, and 1,726 families residing in the city.

== Education ==
Tangipahoa Parish School System operates public schools:

- Ponchatoula High School (near Ponchatoula)
- Ponchatoula Junior High School
- Martha Vineyard Elementary School (near Ponchatoula)
- D. C. Reeves Elementary School
- Tucker Elementary School
- Perrin Early Learning Center

== Visitor attractions ==
Ponchatoula hosts Louisiana's Strawberry Festival each April and an Oktoberfest each autumn.

The town is noted for its many antique shops along Pine Street (LA 22), open year-round. Eleven of the Ponchatoula Commercial Historic District buildings are determined to be historically significant and listed on the National Register of Historic Places. Ponchatoula is small, but it has a number of attractions including a sign on the outskirts of town with how many miles it lies from South Dakota's Wall Drug store.

Located in downtown Ponchatoula is the Collinswood School Museum, a former one-room schoolhouse which exhibits local artifacts and quilts. A memorial for the USNS Ponchatoula is also located at the museum. Between the school museum and the tracks stands the Strawberry Train (Louisiana Cypress #3), which is a steam engine and single passenger car roped off in such a way that children can safely climb into the engine and the car.

The Chamber of Commerce office is located on Highway 22 at the railroad tracks and has information about these and other sights in Ponchatoula and the surrounding area.

=== Strawberry Festival ===
The first Strawberry Festival was held in April 1972 on the first block of North 6th Street and was co-sponsored by the Ponchatoula Jaycees and the Ponchatoula Chamber of Commerce. The first festival was small and only had 11 booths. It was a two-day event beginning with a baseball game between Southeastern Louisiana University and Wisconsin State. Today it is the second largest event in the state, after Mardi Gras. During the 1980s the local economy changed to tourism, when farming no longer earned enough to sustain the town. The mayor at the time devised a plan to open antique shops where former businesses had been located. There are still about six of these shops in operation. This gave the town a second nickname, "America's Antique City."

== Government ==
The town has a mayor-council form of government with a Mayor's Court A Magistrate is over the court and not the mayor.

== Notable people ==
- Irwin Davis, football player, coach, and administrator
- Michael I. Jordan, researcher in Machine Learning and Artificial Intelligence
- Steve Pugh, member of the Louisiana House of Representatives (2008–2020)
- Trevante Rhodes, actor, sprinter
- Bernie Smith, baseball player
- Tyjae Spears, football player
- Irma Thomas, singer
- Reggie Walker, football player
- Earl Wilson, baseball player

== See also ==
- Hammond, Louisiana
- Manchac, Louisiana
- Ponchatoula High School
- Ponchatoula Creek
- USS Ponchatoula (AOG-38)
- USNS Ponchatoula (T-AO-148)
