= 122nd Fighter Squadron =

122nd Fighter Squadron

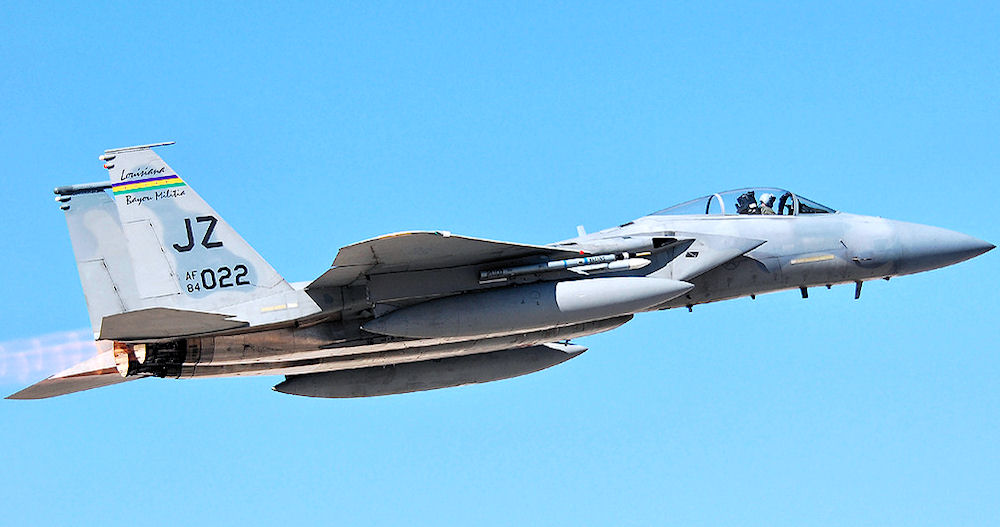
- 122d Fighter Squadron F-15C Eagle (Note: Aircraft is McDonnell Douglas F-15C-38-MC Eagle 84-0022.)
- Active: 1941–1945; 1946–1952; 1953–present
- Country: United States
- Allegiance: Louisiana
- Branch: Air National Guard
- Type: Squadron
- Role: Air Defense
- Part of: Louisiana Air National Guard
- Garrison/HQ: Naval Air Station Joint Reserve Base New Orleans, Louisiana
- Nickname: Bayou Militia
- Decorations: Distinguished Unit Citation; Air Force Outstanding Unit Award

Insignia
- 122d Fighter Squadron emblem

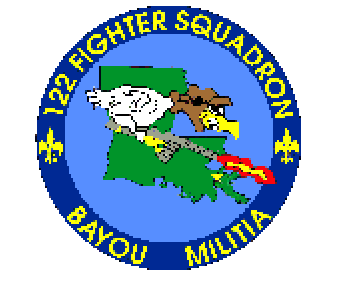
- 122d Fighter-Interceptor Squadron emblem
- Tail code: JZ
- Tail stripe

The 122d Fighter Squadron is a unit of the Louisiana Air National Guard 159th Fighter Wing located at Naval Air Station Joint Reserve Base New Orleans, Louisiana. The 122d is equipped with the McDonnell Douglas F-15 Eagle.

The squadron was first established on 30 July 1940 as the 122d Observation Squadron. It is one of the 29 National Guard observation squadrons of the United States Army National Guard formed before World War II.

== History ==
The 122nd Observation Squadron, was formed in December 1940 at the New Orleans Municipal Airport, (currently known as Lakefront Airport). Two months later, with an assortment of 0-38s, Douglas O-46s, North American O-47s, Stinson O-49 Vigilants and North American BC-1As to fly, the unit was called to active service at Esler Field in Alexandria, LA, in response to a general military call-up following the bombing of Pearl Harbor.

=== World War II ===
With the United States' entry into World War II, the 122nd returned to New Orleans in December 1941 to conduct anti-submarine patrol over the Gulf of Mexico. Four missions were flown each day, the aircraft flying in pairs, as far as 100 miles out into the Gulf.

In February 1942, the Squadron was re-equipped with Douglas A-20 Havoc Attack Bombers and was deployed first to England as part of Eighth Air Force, then to North Africa as part of Operation Torch invasion forces in November 1943, assigned to Twelfth Air Force. The 122nd first landed at Fedala, French Morocco and participated in the capture of Casablanca. There, the squadron became part of the 68th Reconnaissance Group.

Several months later the A-20s were replaced by Lockheed P-38 Lightnings, Bell P-39 Airacobras and Curtiss P-40 Warhawks, and the unit was reorganized as a branch of the North African Fighter Training Command. In the summer of 1943, the unit was moved to Bertaux, Algeria, where members trained French and American pilots in navigation and general fighting tactics.

The 122nd was reassigned to HQ Fifteenth Air Force in May 1944 and was re-designated as the 885th Bombardment Squadron (heavy). Equipped with highly modified Boeing B-17 Flying Fortresses and Consolidated B-24 Liberators, the unit transported supplies to partisans and engaged in nighttime special operations missions, flying into Occupied France, Fascist Italy, Yugoslavia and other parts of Occupied Europe supporting partisans and parachuting Allied Agents into enemy territory. Was inactivated in Italy in October 1945.

=== Louisiana Air National Guard ===
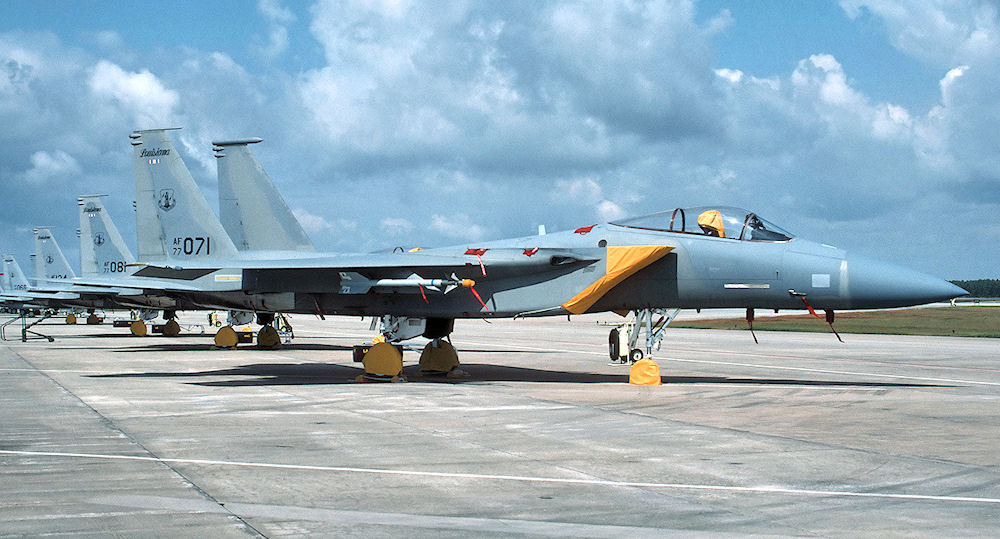
Squadron F-15A Eagle (Note: Aircraft is McDonnell Douglas F-15A-18-MC Eagle, serial 77-0071. This plane was retired to the Aerospace Maintenance and Regeneration Center on 29 January 2007. Baugher, Joe (18 February 2023). "1977 USAF Serial Numbers". Joe Baugher.)

The 885th Bombardment Squadron was redesignated the 122nd Bombardment Squadron and was allotted to the Louisiana National Guard on 24 May 1946. It was organized at New Orleans Municipal Airport, Louisiana and was extended federal recognition on 5 December 1946.

The squadron was equipped with Douglas B-26 Invader light bombers and was allocated to the Tenth Air Force, Continental Air Command. The squadron was equipped with 25 aircraft, mostly Douglas B-26C Invaders, but a few "B" models as well, most of the aircraft assigned were newly manufactured at the Douglas plant in Tulsa, Oklahoma at the end of World War II and were never assigned to any wartime units.

During the postwar years, the Air National Guard was almost like a flying country club and a pilot could often show up at the field, check out an aircraft and go flying. However, these units also had regular military exercises that kept up proficiency and in gunnery and bombing contests they would often score better than full-time USAF units. The pilots practiced formation bombing with the B-26s as well as low-level intrusion and strafing. Parts were no problem and many of the maintenance personnel were World War II veterans so readiness was quite high and the planes were often much better maintained than their USAF counterparts.

==== Korean War federalization ====
With the surprise invasion of South Korea on 25 June 1950, and the regular military's complete lack of readiness, the ANG was mobilized into federal active duty. The 122nd Bombardment Squadron was federalized and ordered to active duty on 1 April 1951. By then most of the squadron's aircraft and many of its pilots had already been transferred to active-duty units and sent to Japan as replacement and reinforcing aircraft for B-26 units engaged in combat.

The squadron was transferred to Langley Air Force Base, Virginia as part of Ninth Air Force, Tactical Air Command (TAC). The 122d became part of the 4400th Combat Crew Training Group, a temporary organization formed by TAC with the mission of training pilots in the B-26 for subsequent deployment to the war zone. The 122d was joined by the Pennsylvania Air National Guard's 117th Bombardment Squadron. On 1 November 1952 the training unit at Langley was inactivated and returned to Louisiana State Control on 1 January 1953.

==== Tactical Bomber mission ====
Following the end of the Korean War, the B-26s began to be withdrawn from active service and replaced by jet-powered equipment such as the Martin B-57 Canberra and the Douglas B-66 Destroyer. The 122nd was re-equipped with former active-duty B-26s and continued training with the versatile light bomber under the Texas Air National Guard's 136th Fighter-Bomber Wing, being operationally gained by TAC.

==== Air Defense mission ====
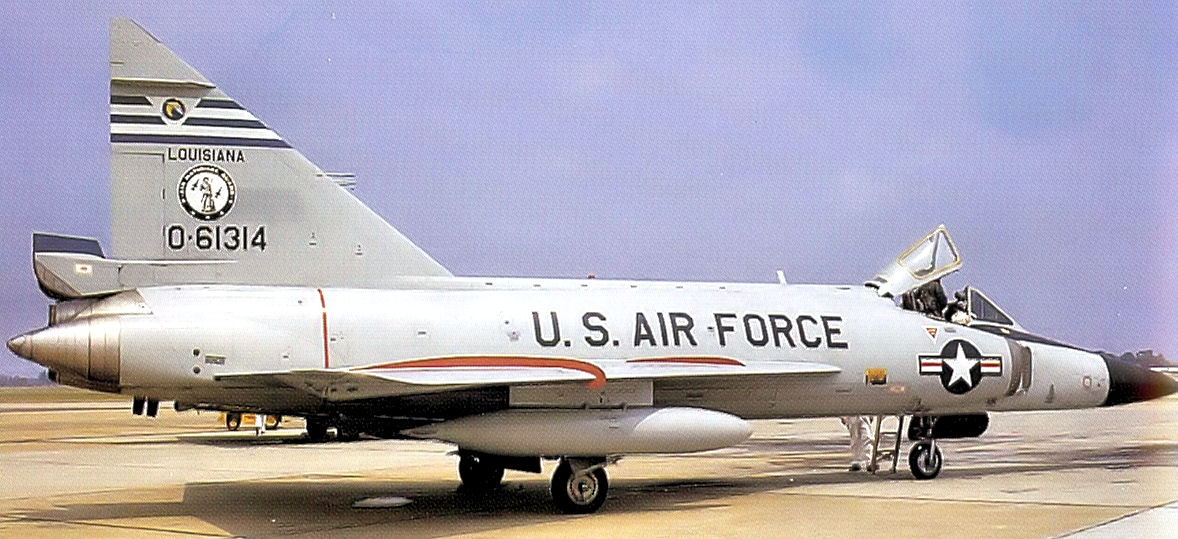
122nd Fighter-Interceptor Squadron F-102A Delta Dagger (Note: Aircraft is Convair F-102A-75-CO Delta Dagger, serial 56-1314. Sent to the Military Aircraft Storage and Disposition Center (MASDC) on 14 August 1974 and converted to PQM-102B target drone. Baugher, Joe (11 May 2023). "1956 USAF Serial Numbers". Joe Baugher. Archived from the original on 23 May 2010.)

In 1957, the 136th Fighter-Bomber Wing was transferred from TAC to Air Defense Command (ADC), being re-designated as an Air Defense Wing. The B-26s were sent to storage at Davis-Monthan Air Force Base, Arizona (many would be later used in the Vietnam War as counter-insurgency aircraft), and the 122nd was redesignated as a Fighter-Interceptor Squadron on 1 June 1957. With the transfer to ADC, the 122nd was initially equipped with some obsolete Lockheed F-80 Shooting Stars|(F-80As modified to F-80C standards) Shooting Stars as an interim aircraft, receiving North American F-86D Sabres in late 1957 and lastly the upgraded F-86L Sabre at the end of the year with uprated afterburning engines and new electronics.

With the F-86L, the squadron was selected by ADC to man a runway alert program on full 24-hour basis – with armed jet fighters ready to "scramble" at a moment's notice. This event brought the squadron into the daily combat operational program of the USAF, placing it on "the end of the runway" alongside regular USAF-Air Defense Fighter Squadrons.

In 1958, the 122nd was authorized to expand to a group level, and the 159th Fighter Interceptor Group was established on 1 April 1958. The 122nd becoming the group's flying squadron. Other support squadrons assigned into the group were the 159th Materiel Squadron, 159th Air Base Squadron, and the 159th USAF Dispensary.

In July 1960, the 159th converted to the Convair F-102 Delta Daggers. In 1962, the 122nd Fighter-Interceptor Squadron was assigned to the Gulfport Combat Readiness Training Center, Mississippi, for six weeks of intensive flying training. Involved were 150 officers and airmen, including support elements from the 159th Consolidated Aircraft Maintenance Squadron, 159th Supply Squadron and 159th Air Base Squadron.

==== Tactical Air Command ====
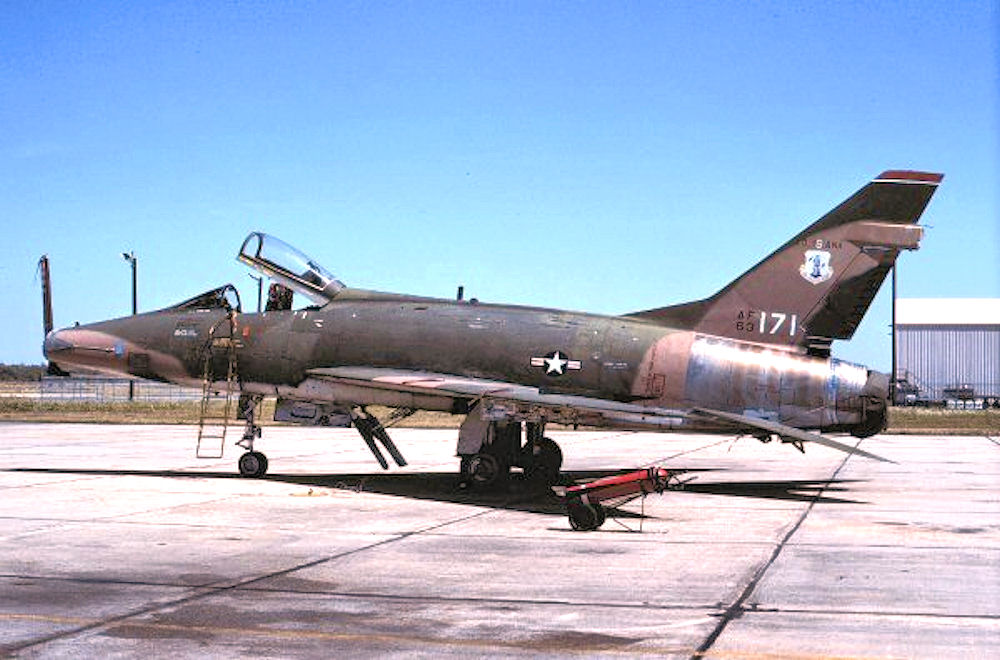
Squadron F-100D Super Sabre (Note: Aircraft is North American F-100D-75-NA Super Sabre, serial 56-3171. Sent to MASDC on 9 March 1979, it was converted to a QF-100D drone and was shot down on 15 November 1988. Baugher, 1956 USAF Serial Numbers. Photo taken about 1975.)

In December 1970 the 159th was transferred from ADC to TAC. ADC was phasing down its manned interceptor force as the chances of a Soviet Bomber attack on the United States seemed remote. The unit was redesignated the 122nd Tactical Fighter Squadron and re-equipped with North American F-100 Super Sabres. In 1970, the F-100 was still considered a first-line aircraft, and most of the F-100s in the inventory were serving in South Vietnam flying combat missions. The Super Sabres received by the 122d came from the 20th Tactical Fighter Wing, which was transitioning to the General Dynamics F-111F. With the conversion to the F-100s, the ADC 24-hour alert status ended and retraining in tactical fighter missions began.

The 122nd flew the F-100s for almost a decade, retiring the aircraft beginning in April 1979 when the 122nd began receiving McDonnell F-4C Phantom II aircraft from active-duty units. In 1979 ADC was inactivated, with TAC taking over the Continental US Air Defense Mission. The 159th Group was assigned to Air Defense, Tactical Air Command (ADTAC), a named unit at the Numbered Air Force level under TAC. Under ADTAC, the 122nd began to fly air defense missions again with the Phantom II, although the squadron continued to fly tactical fighter training missions with the Phantom.

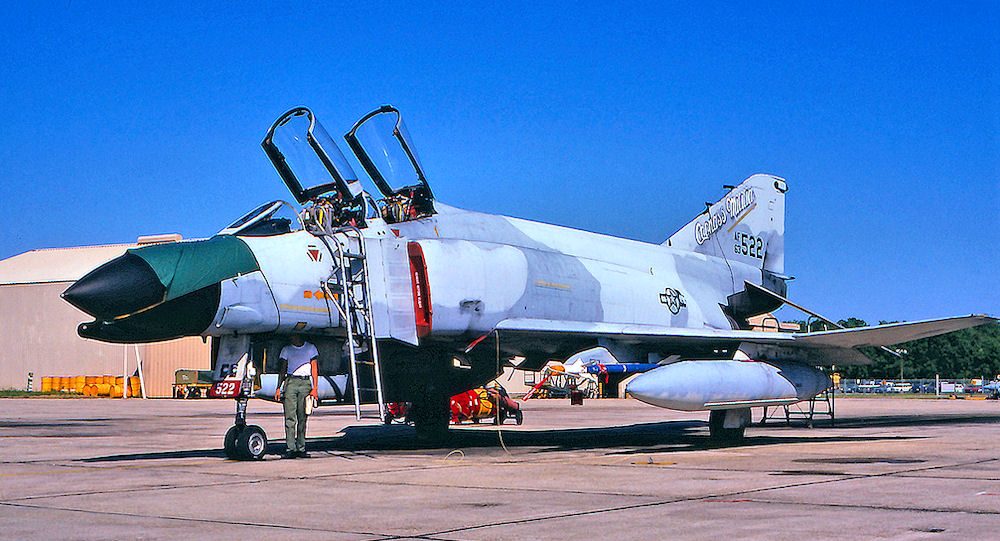
122nd F-4C Phantom II (Note: Aircraft is McDonnell F-4C-19-MC Phantom II, serial 63-7552. Airframe later used as a battle damage repair trainer at Bergstrom AFB. Baugher, Joe (26 July 2023). "1963 USAF Serial Numbers". Joe Baugher.)

The Phantoms were ending their service life in the mid-1980s, and in 1986, the F-4Cs were replaced by McDonnell F-15A Eagles. As the F-15s had no tactical bombing capability at the time, the 122d continued the air defense mission under TAC.

==== Modern era ====
In March 1992 the 159th Tactical Fighter Group became the 159th Fighter Group when the unit adopted the USAF Objective Organization, and the 122nd Fighter Squadron was assigned to the new 159th Operations Group. Later in June, TAC stood down and most of its units transferred to by Air Combat Command. No change in mission was made and the 159th continued in the air defense role.

In the early 1990s, squadron aircraft and personnel were deployed to Aviano Air Base, Italy, flying combat missions over the former Yugoslavia during the Kosovo War as part of Operation Allied Force. On 11 October 1995, in accordance with the "one base-one wing" policy, the 159th Fighter Group was redesignated as the 159th Fighter Wing.

In mid-1996, the Air Force, in response to budget cuts, and changing world situations, began experimenting with Air Expeditionary organizations. The Air Expeditionary Force (AEF) concept was developed that would mix Active-Duty, Reserve and Air National Guard elements into a combined force. Instead of entire permanent units deploying as "Provisional" as in the 1991 Gulf War, Expeditionary units are composed of "aviation packages" from several wings, including active-duty Air Force, the Air Force Reserve Command and the Air National Guard, would be married together to carry out the assigned deployment rotation.

In the late 1990s, the 122nd Expeditionary Fighter Squadron was activated on several occasions, sending packages of personnel and aircraft to Incirlik Air Base, Turkey, to fly Combat Air Patrol missions over Iraq as part of Operation Northern Watch. Also the 122nd EFS was activated with a deployment to Prince Sultan Air Base, Saudi Arabia, flying CAP missions over Southern Iraq as part of Operation Southern Watch.

In response to the 9/11 attacks in 2001, the 122nd Fighter Squadron engaged in Combat Air Patrols over major United States Cities as part of Operation Noble Eagle (ONE). ONE patrols continued into 2002 before being scaled down.

In 2006, the F-15A models were retired and the 122nd was upgraded to the more capable F-15C Eagle. As part of the global war on terrorism, the 122nd EFS has been deployed to support Operation Iraqi Freedom (OIF); Operation Enduring Freedom (OEF) in Afghanistan, Operation New Horizons in Central and South America and Operation New Dawn in Afghanistan.

The most recent deployment of the 122nd Expeditionary Fighter Squadron was completed in October 2012 when the squadron deployed to at Al Dhafra Air Base, United Arab Emirates, and as part of the 380th Expeditionary Operations Group, the 122nd EFS flew missions in support of the joint air defense of the Persian Gulf and Operation Enduring Freedom. The mission included providing air superiority in support of national military objectives and flying fighter integration sorties with F-22 Raptors and McDonnell Douglas F-15E Strike Eagles.

== Lineage ==
- Designated as the 122d Observation Squadron, and allotted to the National Guard on 30 July 1940

Activated on 2 March 1941
Ordered to active service on 1 October 1941
Redesignated 122d Observation Squadron (Light) on 13 January 1942
Redesignated 122d Observation Squadron (Medium) on 12 March 1942
Redesignated 122d Observation Squadron on 4 July 1942
Redesignated 122d Liaison Squadron on 31 May 1943
Redesignated 885th Bombardment Squadron, Heavy on 12 May 1944
Inactivated on 4 October 1945

- Redesignated 122d Bombardment Squadron, Light and allotted to the National Guard on 24 May 1946

Organized on 2 November 1946
Extended federal recognition on 5 December 1946
Federalized and ordered to active service on 1 April 1951
Inactivated and returned to Louisiana state control on 1 January 1953
Activated on 1 January 1953
Redesignated 122d Bombardment Squadron, Tactical in 1955
Redesignated 122d Fighter-Interceptor Squadron on 1 June 1957
Redesignated 122d Tactical Fighter Squadron on 5 December 1970
Redesignated 122d Fighter Squadron on 15 March 1992

=== Assignments ===
- Louisiana National Guard, 2 March 1941
- 68th Observation Group (later 68th Reconnaissance Group, 68th Tactical Reconnaissance Group), 1 October 1941
- Fifteenth Air Force, 15 June 1944 (attached to Mediterranean Allied Air Forces)
- 15th Special Group (later 2641st Special Group), 20 January–20 May 1945
- Army Air Forces Service Command, Mediterranean Theater of Operations, 1945–4 Oct 1945
- Louisiana National Guard, 2 November 1946
- 136th Fighter Group, 5 December 1946
- 111th Bombardment Group, 1 December 1948
- Louisiana Air National Guard, 1 November 1950
- 111th Bombardment Group, 1 February 1951
- 4400th Combat Crew Training Group, 13 April 1951 – 1 January 1953
- 131st Bombardment Group, 1 January 1953
- 159th Fighter Group (later 159th Tactical Fighter Group, 159th Fighter Group, 159th Fighter wing), 15 June 1957
- 159th Operations Group, 11 October 1995 – present

=== Stations ===
- New Orleans Municipal Airport, Louisiana, 2 March 1941
- Esler Field, Louisiana, 6 October 1941
- New Orleans Army Air Base, Louisiana, 13 December 1941
- Daniel Field, Georgia, 8 February 1942
- Lawson Field, Georgia, 16 April 1942
- Daniel Field, Georgia, 14 June 1942
- Winston-Salem Airport, North Carolina, 7 July 1942
- Morris Field, North Carolina, 16 August 1942

Detachment at Fort Dix Army Air Field, New Jersey, 26 September 1942

- Langley Field, Virginia, 3–23 Oct 1942

Detachment at RAF Wattisham (AAF-377), England, 5–21 Oct 1942

- Fedala Airfield, French Morocco, 9 November 1942
- Casablanca-Anfa Airport, French Morocco, 12 November 1942
- Oujda Airfield, French Morocco, 10 December 1942
- Berguent Airfield, French Morocco, 24 March 1943
- Berteaux Airfield, Algeria, 5 September 1943
- Manduria Airfield, Italy, 25 December 1943
- Blida Airport, Algeria, 12 April 1944
- Maison Blanche Airport, Algeria, 25 Aug-2 Oct 1944
- Brindisi Airport, Italy, 31 October 1944
- Rosignano Airfield, Italy, 20 March 1945
- Pomigliano Airfield, Italy, 20 May-4 Oct 1945
- New Orleans Municipal Airport, Louisiana, 5 December 1946
- Langley Air Force Base, Virginia, 13 April 1951 – 1 January 1953
- New Orleans Lakefront Airport, Louisiana, 1 January 1953
- Naval Air Station Joint Reserve Base New Orleans, Louisiana, Dec 1957–present

=== Aircraft ===
- Douglas O-38, 1941–1942
- Douglas O-46, 1941–1942
- North American O-47, 1941–1942
- Stinson O-49 Vigilant, 1941–1942
- Douglas A-20 Havoc, 1942
- Lockheed P-38 Lightning, 1943
- Bell P-39 Airacobra, 1943
- Curtiss P-40 Warhawk, 1943
- Boeing B-17 Flying Fortress, 1943–1945
- Consolidated B-24 Liberator, 1944–1945
- Douglas B-26 Invader, 1946–1957
- Lockheed F-80C Shooting Star, 1957
- North American F-86D Sabre, 1957
- North American F86L Sabre, 1957–1960
- Convair F-102A Delta Dagger, 1960–1970
- Convair TF-102A Delta Dagger, 1960–1970
- North American F-100D Super Sabre, 1970–1979
- North American F-100F Super Sabre, 1970–1979
- McDonnell F-4C Phantom II, 1979–1985
- McDonnell F-15A Eagle, 1985–2006
- McDonnell F-15B Eagle, 1985–2006
- Lockheed WC-130H, 1989-2007
- McDonnell F-15C Eagle, 2006–present
- McDonnell F-15D Eagle, 2006–present

== See also ==
- List of observation squadrons of the United States Army National Guard
