= Hammond Northshore Regional Airport =

- IATA: none; ICAO: KHDC; FAA LID: HDC

Summary
- Airport type: Public
- Owner: City of Hammond
- Serves: Hammond, Louisiana
- Elevation AMSL: 46 ft (14 m)
- Coordinates: 30°31′18″N 090°25′06″W
- Website: www.hammond.org/...
- Interactive map of Hammond Northshore Regional Airport

Runways
Direction	Length		Surface
Direction	ft	m	Surface
13/31	6,502	1,982	Asphalt/concrete
18/36	5,001	1,524	Concrete

Statistics (2021)
- Aircraft operations: 86,500
- Based aircraft: 91
- Source: Federal Aviation Administration

Hammond Northshore Regional Airport (ICAO: KHDC, FAA LID: HDC) is a city-owned, public-use, joint civil-military, general aviation airport located three nautical miles (6 km) northeast of the central business district of Hammond, a city in Tangipahoa Parish, Louisiana, United States. The airport was previously an uncontrolled facility utilizing VHF-band UNICOM as a Common Traffic Advisory Frequency (CTAF). As a result of the relocation of Army National Guard flight operations from Lakefront Airport to Hammond, a new control tower was constructed at the airport. This tower, staffed by military air traffic controllers from the Air Operations Department of the Louisiana Army National Guard's Army Aviation Support Facility #1 at the airport, became operational on 15 December 2014.

Although most U.S. airports use the same three-letter location identifier for the FAA and IATA, this airport is assigned HDC by the FAA but has no designation from the IATA.

== Facilities and aircraft ==
Hammond Northshore Regional Airport covers an area of 920 acres (370 ha) at an elevation of 46 feet (14 m) above mean sea level. It has two runways: 13/31 is 6,502 by 100 feet (1,982 x 30 m) with an asphalt/concrete surface; 18/36 is 5,001 by 150 feet (1,524 x 46 m) with a concrete surface.

For the 12-month period ending December 31, 2021, the airport had 86,500 aircraft operations, an average of 237 per day: 75% general aviation, 23% military and 2% air taxi. At that time there were 91 aircraft based at this airport: 57 single-engine, 20 military, 2 multi-engine, 10 jet and 2 helicopter.

The Louisiana Army National Guard maintains a 56-acre (230,000 m^{2}) campus (constructed in 2008-2009) at the Hammond airport, which is home to the 1/244th Air Assault Helicopter Battalion, which operates UH-60 Blackhawk helicopters, and the 204th Theater Air Operation Command. The Louisiana Air National Guard also maintains a non-flying unit, the 236th Combat Communications Squadron (236 CCS), at the airport.

In March 2024, the NEXRAD weather radar from Slidell was moved to the airport and now provides coverage in between Lake Charles and Mobile with the call ID of KHDC.

== History ==
During World War II, part of the airport served as a detention camp for prisoners of war from Germany.

== See also ==
- List of airports in Louisiana
