= 159th Fighter Wing =

Louisiana Air National Guard unit

159th Fighter Wing

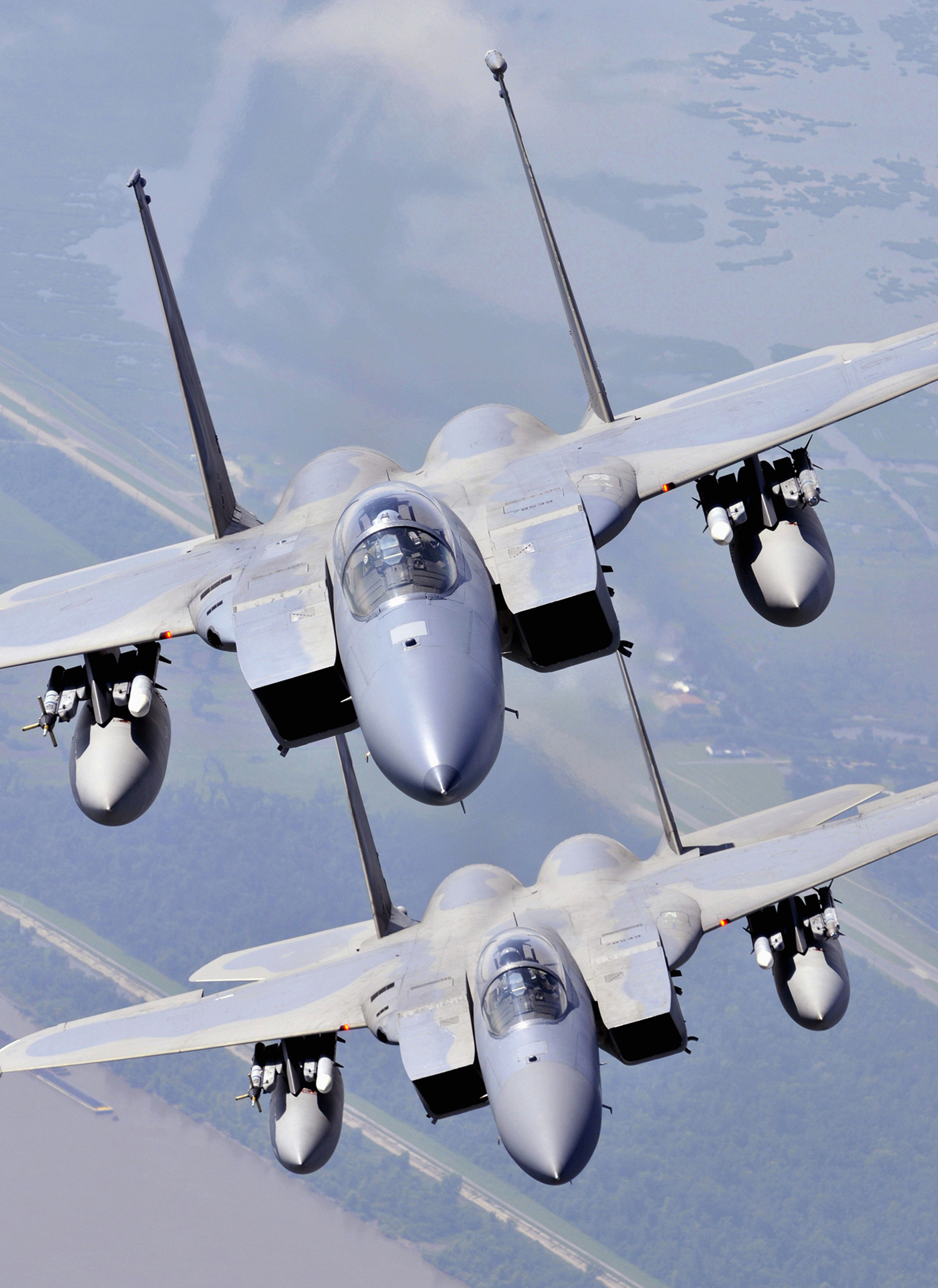
- 159th Fighter Wing F-15C Eagles fly over southern Louisiana wetlands
- Active: 1958–1970; 1970–present
- Country: United States
- Allegiance: Louisiana
- Branch: Air National Guard
- Type: Wing
- Role: Air defense
- Part of: Louisiana Air National Guard
- Garrison/HQ: Naval Air Station Joint Reserve Base New Orleans, Louisiana
- Nickname: Bayou Militia
- Decorations: Air Force Outstanding Unit Award

Insignia
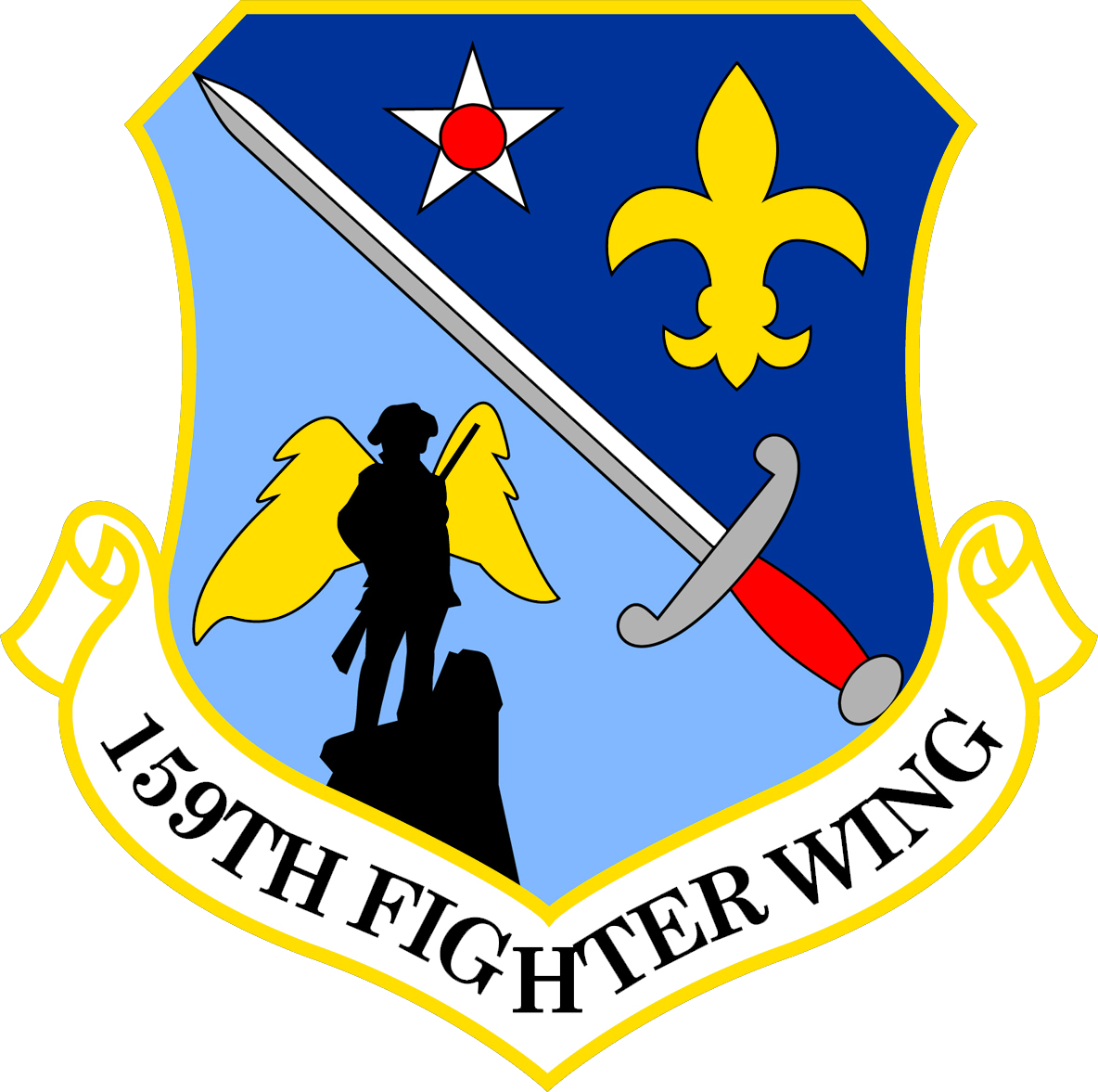
- 159th Fighter Wing emblem
- Tail stripe: Purple/Yellow/Green tail stripe "Louisiana"
- Tail code: LA Bayou Militia

The 159th Fighter Wing is a unit of the Louisiana Air National Guard, stationed at Naval Air Station Joint Reserve Base New Orleans, Louisiana. If activated to federal service, it is gained by the United States Air Force Air Combat Command.

== Mission ==
The 159th Fighter Wing, nicknamed "The Bayou Militia," (Note: The title "Coonass Militia" was changed to "Cajun Militia" in 1992, and subsequently changed to "Bayou Militia" in the late 1990s. "Cajun Militia" was dropped after a right wing "militia" began using the name.) is an Air National Guard F-15C Eagle fighter unit located at Naval Air Station Joint Reserve Base New Orleans, Louisiana. The 159th Fighter Wing is tasked with providing air superiority over Louisiana and the Gulf Coast while supporting USNORTHCOM and NORAD.

The wing uses warning area airspace over the Gulf of Mexico for most of their training. Supersonic flight, necessary for realistic training, is conducted away from the shoreline in a manner that does not disturb the public. Some forms of chaff, however, do interfere electronically with the Houston FAA ARTCC.

== Units ==
The 159th Fighter Wing consists of the following units:

- 159th Operations Group

122nd Fighter Squadron

- 159th Maintenance Group
- 159th Mission Support Group
- 159th Medical Group
- 214th Engineering & Installation Squadron
- 236th Combat Communications Squadron (Hammond, Louisiana)
- 259th Air Traffic Control Squadron (Alexandria, Louisiana)
- 122d Air Support Operations Squadron (Pineville, Louisiana)

== History ==
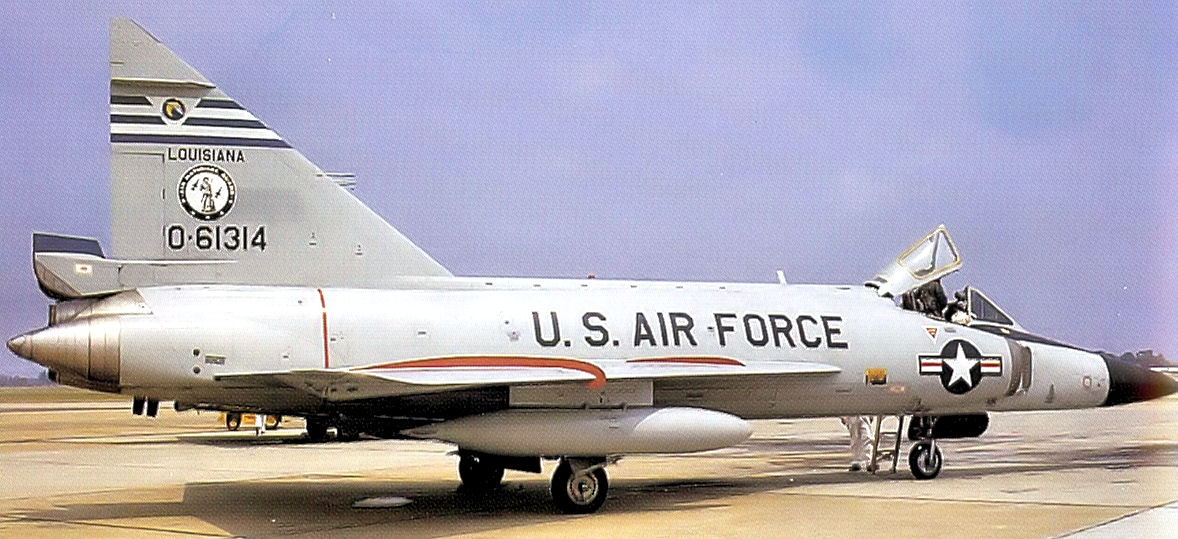
122d Fighter-Interceptor Squadron – Convair F-102A Delta Dagger 56-1314

The 122nd Fighter Squadron, assigned to the Wing's 159th Operations Group, is a descendant organization of the 122nd Observation Squadron, established on 30 July 1940. It is one of the 29 original National Guard Observation Squadrons of the United States Army National Guard formed before World War II.

In 1958, the 122nd Fighter-Interceptor Squadron was authorized to expand to a group level, and the 159th Fighter Interceptor Group was established by the National Guard Bureau on 1 April 1958, 122nd becoming the group's flying squadron. Other support squadrons assigned to the group were the 159th Headquarters, 159th Material Squadron (Maintenance and Supply), 159th Air Base Squadron, and the 159th USAF Dispensary. The 122nd was equipped with the North American F-86L Sabre.

=== Air defense mission ===
With the F-86L, the squadron stood a runway alert program on full 24-hour basis – with armed jet fighters ready to "scramble" at a moment's notice. This event brought the 159th into the daily combat operational program of the USAF, placing it on "the end of the runway" alongside regular USAF-Air Defense Fighter Squadrons.

In July 1960, the 159th converted to the Convair F-102 Delta Dagger. In 1962, the 122nd Fighter-Interceptor Squadron was assigned to the Gulfport Combat Readiness Training Center, Mississippi, for six weeks of intensive flying training. Involved were 150 officers and airmen, including support elements from the 159th Consolidated Aircraft Maintenance Squadron, 159th Material Squadron and 159th Air Base Squadron.

==== Tactical Air Command ====
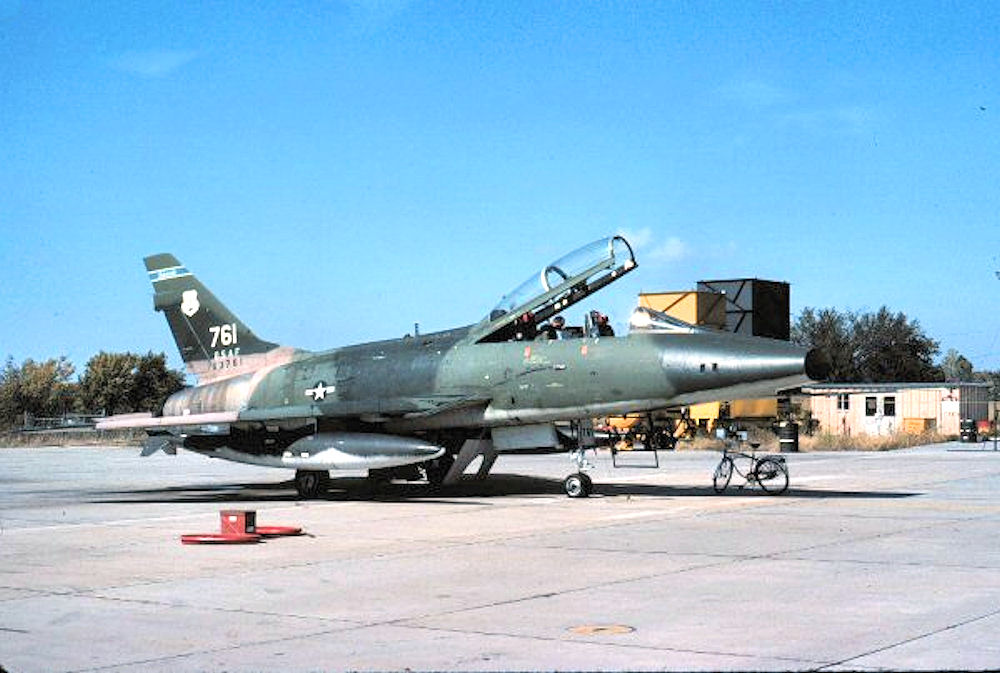
122d Tactical Fighter Squadron – North American F-100F-5-NA Super Sabre 56-3761

In December 1970 the 159th was transferred from Aerospace Defense Command to Tactical Air Command. ADC was phasing out its crewed interceptor force, as the chances of a Soviet bomber attack seemed remote. The unit was re-designated the 159th Tactical Fighter Group, and the 122nd Tactical Fighter Squadron was re-equipped with North American F-100 Super Sabres. In 1970, the F-100 was still considered a first-line aircraft, and most of the F-100s in the inventory were serving in South Vietnam flying combat missions. The Super Sabres received by the 122nd came from the USAFE 20th Tactical Fighter Wing which was transitioning to the General Dynamics F-111F. With the conversion to the F-100, the ADC 24-hour alert status ended and retraining in tactical fighter missions began.

The 159th flew the F-100s for almost a decade, retiring the aircraft beginning in April 1979 when the 122nd began receiving F-4C Phantom II aircraft from active-duty units. In 1979 Aerospace Defense Command was inactivated, with Tactical Air Command taking over the Continental US Air Defense Mission. The 159th was assigned to Air Defense, Tactical Air Command (ADTAC), a named unit at the Numbered Air Force level under TAC. Under ADTAC, the 122nd began to fly Air Defense missions again with the F-4C, although the squadron was dual-hatted and continued to fly Tactical Fighter training missions with the Phantom.

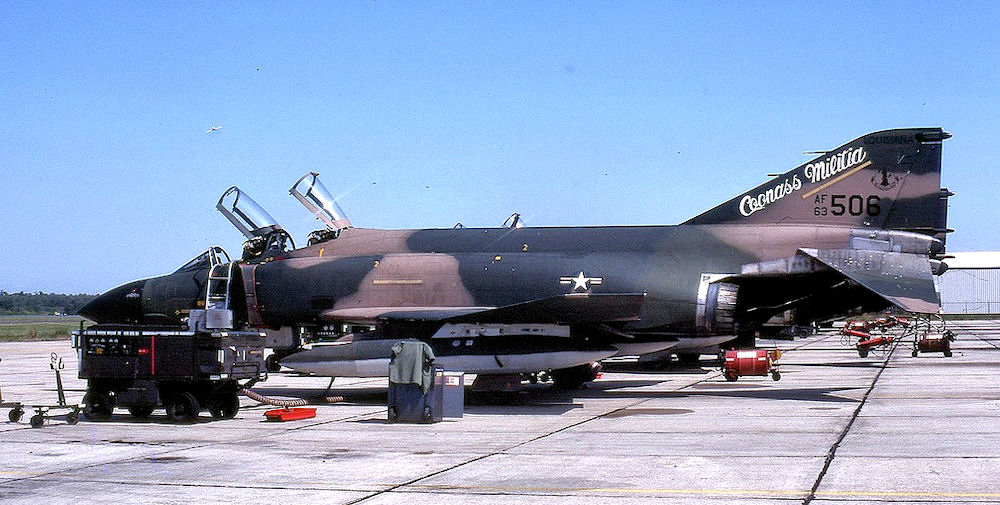
122d Tactical Fighter Squadron – McDonnell F-4C-18-MC Phantom 63-7506 still in Vietnam War camouflage livery

The Phantoms were ending their service life in the mid-1980s, and in 1986, the F-4Cs were replaced by F-15A/B Eagles. As the F-15s had no tactical bombing capability at the time, the 122nd continued the Air Defense mission under TAC.

==== Current operations ====
In March 1992 the group became the 159th Fighter Group when the unit adopted the USAF Objective Organization, and the 122nd Fighter Squadron was assigned to the new 159th Operations Group. Later in June, Tactical Air Command stood down and was replaced by Air Combat Command (ACC). No change in mission was made and the 159th continued in the air defense role.

In the early 1990s, squadron aircraft and personnel were deployed to Aviano Air Base, Italy, flying combat missions over the former Yugoslavia during the Kosovo War as part of Operation Allied Force. On 11 October 1995, in accordance with the "one base-one wing" policy, the 159th Fighter Group was changed in status and was re-designated as the 159th Fighter Wing.

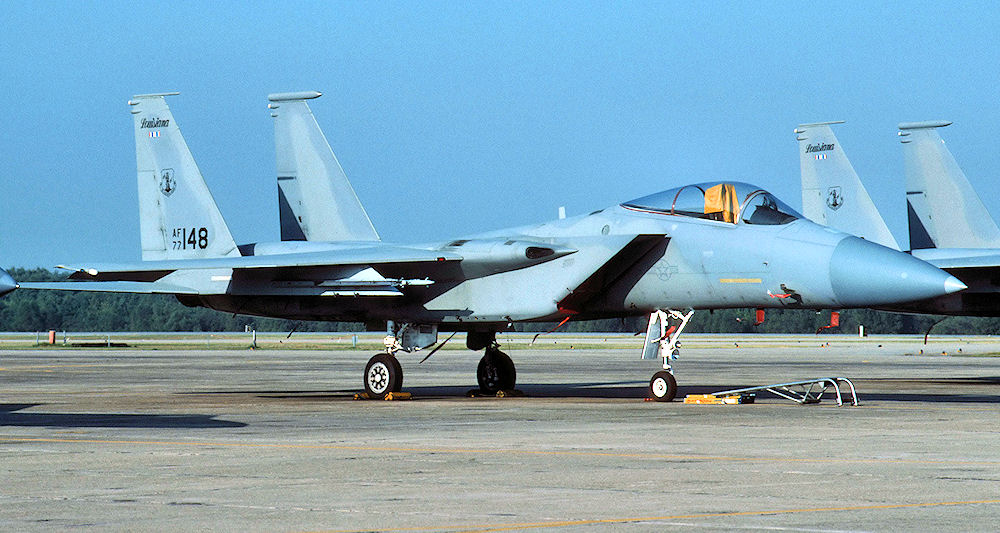
122d Tactical Fighter Squadron – McDonnell Douglas F-15A-20-MC Eagle 77-0148 about 1990

In mid-1996, the Air Force, in response to budget cuts, and changing world situations, began experimenting with Air Expeditionary organizations. The Air Expeditionary Force (AEF) concept was developed that would mix Active-Duty, Reserve and Air National Guard elements into a combined force. Instead of entire permanent units deploying as "Provisional" as in the 1991 Gulf War, Expeditionary units are composed of "aviation packages" from several wings, including active-duty Air Force, the Air Force Reserve Command and the Air National Guard, would be married together to carry out the assigned deployment rotation.

In the late 1990s, the 122nd Expeditionary Fighter Squadron was activated on several occasions, sending packages of personnel and aircraft Incirlik Air Base, Turkey, to fly Combat Air Patrol missions over Iraq as part of Operation Northern Watch. Also the 122nd EFS was activated with a deployment to Prince Sultan Air Base, Saudi Arabia, flying CAP missions over Southern Iraq as part of Operation Southern Watch. On 25 June 1999, members of the 159th Fighter Wing, New Orleans ANG, while on deployment to NAS Keflavik, Iceland, flying F-15A aircraft, intercepted two Russian TU-95 "Bear-H" aircraft.

In response to the 9/11 attacks in 2001, the 122nd Fighter Squadron engaged in Combat Air Patrols over major United States Cities as part of Operation Noble Eagle. Patrols continued into 2002 before being scaled down.

159th Fighter Wing was awarded the "Outstanding Air National Guard Unit" in 2003. This award is given annually to the Air National Guard unit which meets or exceeds the criteria from the National Guard Bureau.

In 2006, the F-15A models were retired and the 122nd was upgraded to the more capable F-15C Eagle. As part of the global war on terrorism, the 122nd EFS has been deployed to support Operation Iraqi Freedom; Operation Enduring Freedom in Afghanistan, Operation New Horizons in Central and South America and Operation New Dawn in Afghanistan.

The most recent deployment of the 122nd Expeditionary Fighter Squadron was completed in October 2012 when the squadron deployed to at Al Dhafra Air Base, United Arab Emirates, and as part of the 380th Expeditionary Operations Group, the 122nd EFS flew missions in support of the Joint Air Defense of the Persian Gulf and Operation Enduring Freedom. The mission included providing air superiority in support of national military objectives and flying Fighter Integration Sorties with F-22 Raptors and F-15E Strike Eagles.

==== BRAC 2005 Recommendations ====
In its 2005 BRAC Recommendations, the Department of Defense recommended to realign the 142nd Fighter Wing (ANG) at Portland IAP AGS, Oregon, by distributing the wing's F-15 aircraft to the 159th Fighter Wing (ANG), New Orleans ARS, Louisiana (nine aircraft) and another installation. New Orleans had above average military value for reserve component bases, and realigning aircraft from Portland would create another optimum-sized fighter squadron at New Orleans. By relocating the geographically separated Air National Guard squadron onto New Orleans, the Air Force would best utilize available facilities on the installation while reducing the cost to the government to lease facilities in the community. However, the Pentagon's recommendation was rejected by the BRAC Commission and the 142nd Fighter Wing ended up gaining three more aircraft in the process.

=== Lineage ===
159th Fighter Group

- Established as the 159th Fighter Group (Air Defense) and allotted to the Air National Guard in 1958

Extended federal recognition on 1 March 1958
Inactivated on 5 December 1970
Consolidated with the 159th Tactical Fighter Group

159th Fighter Wing
Established as the 159th Tactical Fighter Group on 1 December 1970
Activated on 5 December 1970
Redesignated 159th Fighter Group on 15 March 1992
Redesignated 159th Fighter Wing on 11 October 1995

=== Assignments ===
- 136th Air Defense Wing, 1 March 1958
- Louisiana Air National Guard, 30 August 1961

Gained by: Montgomery Air Defense Sector, Air Defense Command
Gained by: 32d Air Division, Air Defense Command, 1 April 1966
Gained by: 32d Air Division, Aerospace Defense Command, 15 January 1968
Gained by: Tactical Air Command, 5 December 1970
Gained by: Air Combat Command, 1 June 1992

=== Components ===
- 159th Operations Group, 15 March 1992 – Present
- 122nd Fighter-Interceptor (later 122nd Tactical Fighter Squadron, 122nd Fighter Squadron), 1 March 1958 – 15 March 1992

=== Stations ===
- NAS New Orleans (later NAS-JRB New Orleans), Louisiana, 1 March 1958 – present

=== Aircraft ===
- F-86L Sabre Interceptor, 1958–1960
- TF/F-102A Delta Dagger, 1960–1970
- F-100D/F Super Sabre, 1970–1979
- F-4C Phantom II, 1979–1985
- F-15A/B Eagle, 1985–2006
- Lockheed WC-130H, 1989 – 2007
- F-15C/D Eagle, 2006–present

=== Decorations ===
- Outstanding Unit Award
