= Tangipahoa African American Heritage Museum =

Museum in Hammond, Louisiana, United States

- TAAHM

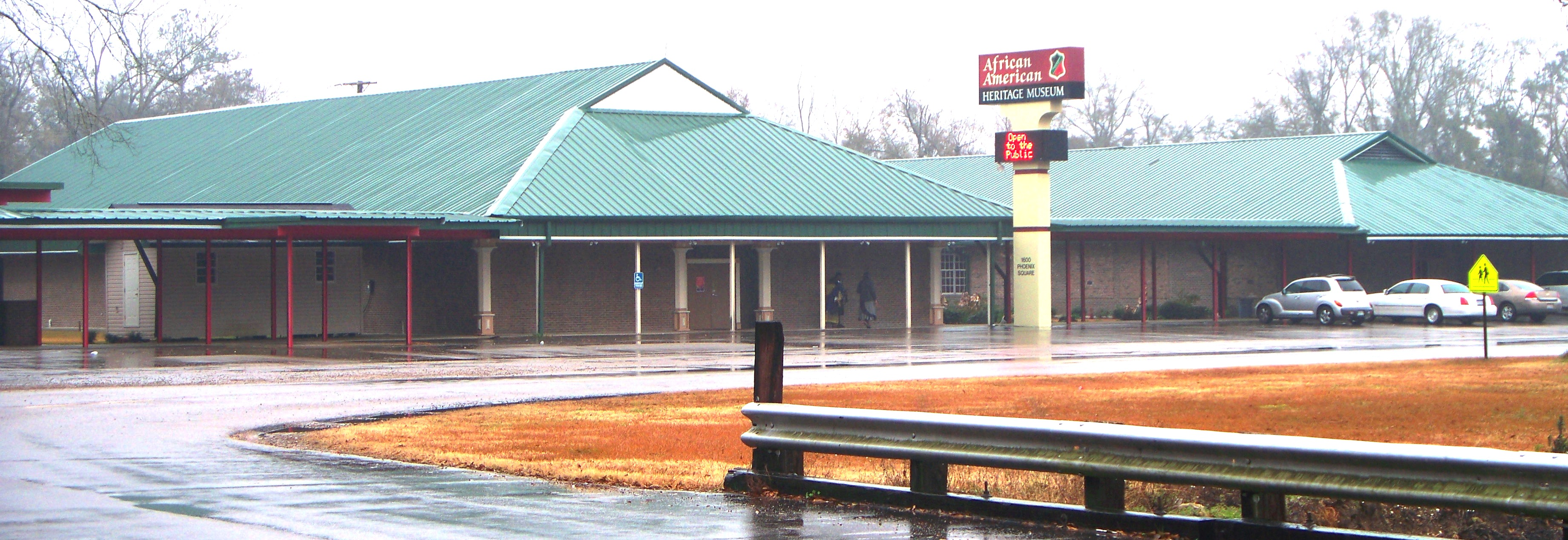
- Museum from the Ponchatoula Creek tributary
- Established: 1984 (Organization); 2007 (Current location)
- Location: 1600 Phoenix Square; Hammond, Louisiana 70401
- Coordinates: 30.4937115°N 90.4755016°W
- Type: African-American history
- Treasurer: Samuel Paul
- Directors: Sylvia Hurst, MBA
- Presidents: Delmas A. Dunn, Sr.
- Website: www.taahm.org

The Tangipahoa African American Heritage Museum & Veterans Archives is a museum on Phoenix Square in Hammond, Louisiana.

There are three main buildings. The north building has a dinner theater and storage. The middle building contains the main displays of African American heritage. The south building offers a spacious banquet hall together with multi-purpose conference facilities. The Museum is one of 26 sites on the Louisiana African American Heritage Trail, as cited by USA Today.

The Museum originated in the 1980s and has incrementally expanded in both displays and community services. A special arena of concentration in the Museum is its collection of data and exhibits on African American veterans of military service. The Museum has a Cooperative Endeavor Agreement with Southeastern Louisiana University.

== Gallery ==
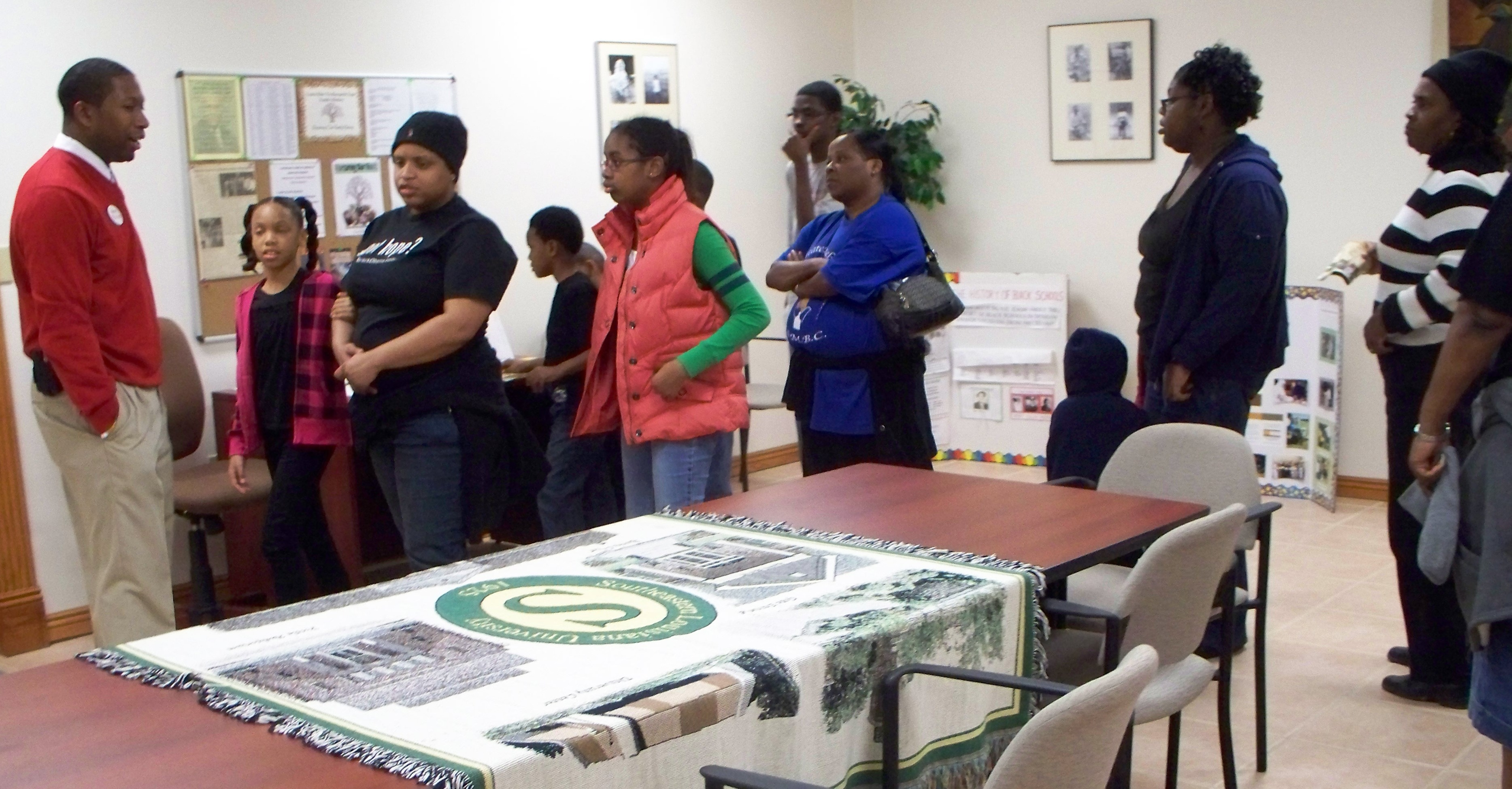
Tour guide (left) explains Southeastern Louisiana University's Genealogical Research archives

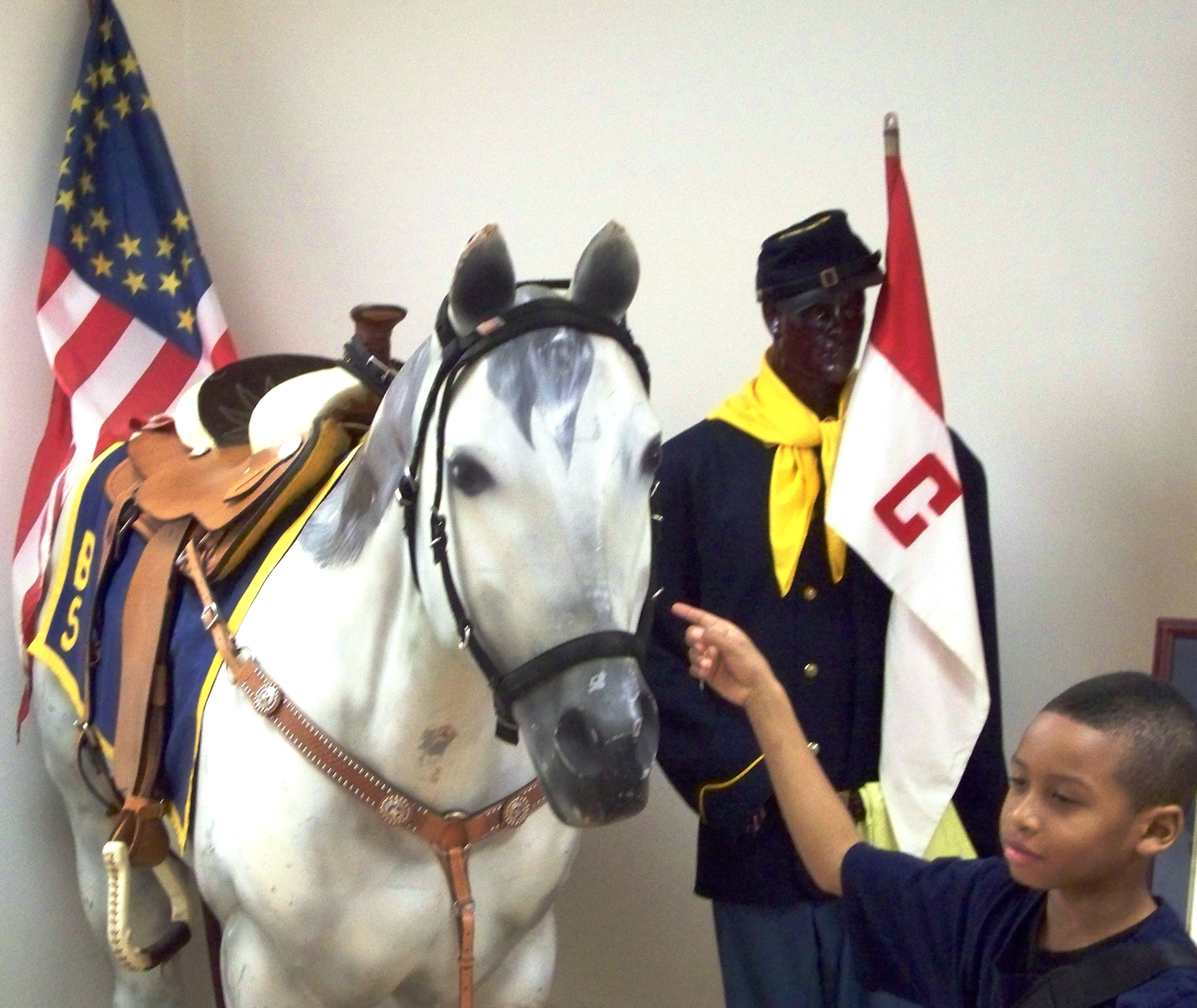
A child examines the Buffalo Soldiers display in the Black Veterans section

== See also ==
- List of museums in Louisiana
- List of museums focused on African Americans
