= 236th Combat Communications Squadron =

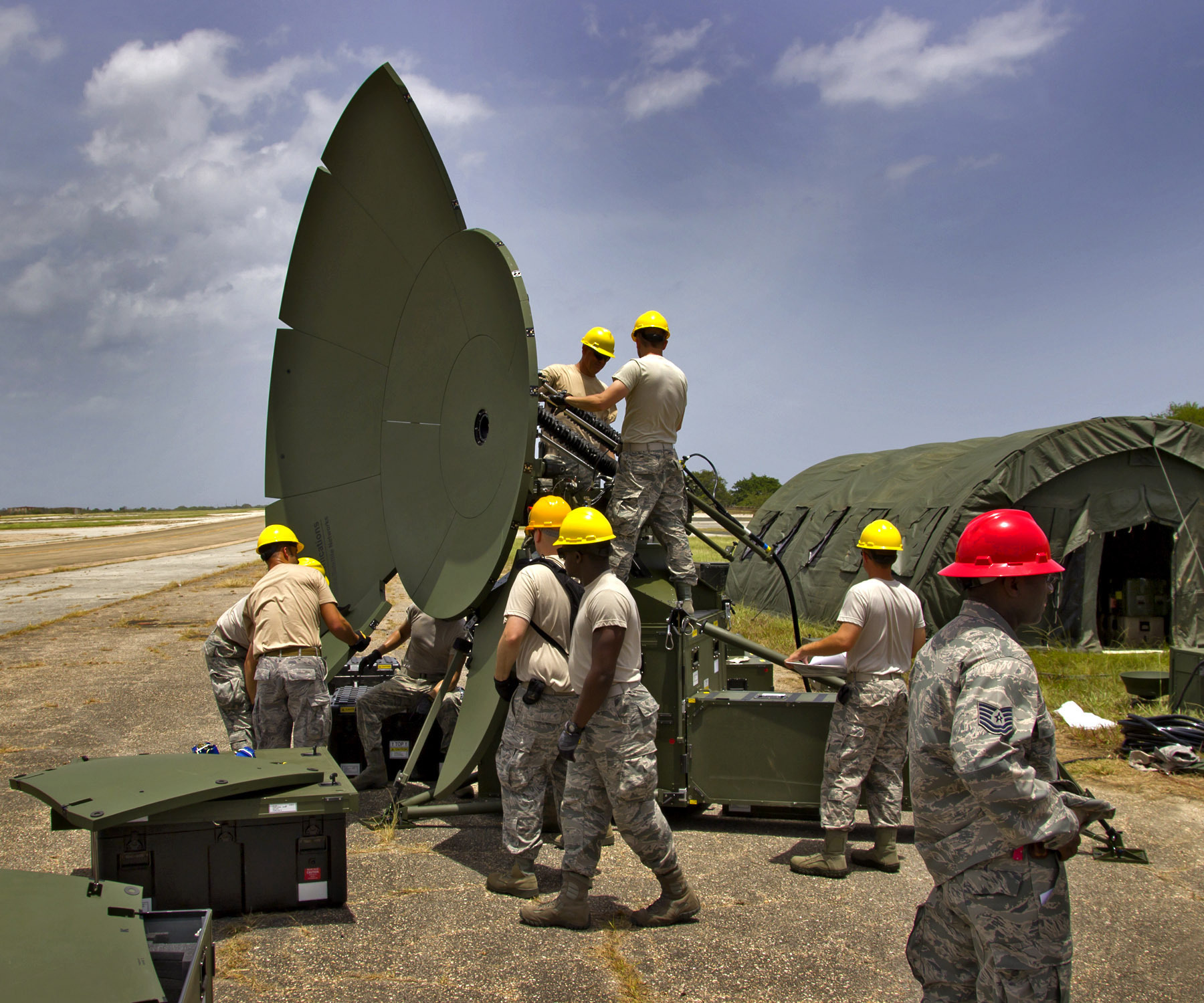
- 236th Combat Communications Squadron members assemble a Ground Multi-Band Terminal in Aguadilla, Puerto Rico during a training exercise
- Active: 1953 – present
- Country: United States
- Branch: United States Air Force
- Type: Combat Communications
- Part of: Louisiana Air National Guard
- Garrison/HQ: Hammond, Louisiana
- Decorations: Air Force Outstanding Unit Award

Insignia
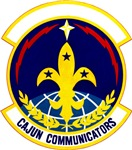
- 236th Combat Communications Squadron emblem

The United States Air Force's 236th Combat Communications Squadron (236 CBCS) is an Air National Guard combat communications unit located at Hammond, Louisiana. It is part of the Louisiana Air National Guard. In late 2011, approximately 30 members of the squadron deployed to Afghanistan.

== Assignments ==
=== Major Command/Gaining Command ===
- 14th Air Force (1953–1979)
- Air Force Communications Command (1979–1993?)
- Air National Guard/Air Force Communications Service/254th Combat Communications Group (1978–present)
- Air Force Space Command (?–present)

== Previous designations ==
- 236th Airways Air Communication Service Flight (1953–1976)
- 236th Combat Communications Flight (1976–1982)
- 236th Combat Communications Squadron (1982–1985)
- 236th Combat Information Systems Squadron (1985–1986)
- 236th Combat Communications Squadron (1986–present)

== Bases stationed ==
- New Orleans Airport (1953–1954)
- Hammond Airport (1954–present)

== Equipment Operated ==
- MPN-14 Mobile Air Traffic Control Radar System throughout the 1980s.
- Mobile Air Traffic Control Tower (1980s).
- Mobile Crypto Communications System (1980s).
- Satellite Communications Arrays (1980s).

== Awards/Decorations ==
- Air Force Outstanding Unit Award: 1 May 1976 – 30 April 1978; 1 January 1989 – 31 December 1990; 1 May 1992 – 30 April 1993; 1 May 1993 – 30 April 1994; 1 May 1995 – 30 April 1996; 1 July 1998 – 30 June 2000; 1 October 2006 – 30 September 2008.

== Emblem ==
Blue and yellow are the Air Force colors. Blue alludes to the sky, the primary theater of Air Force operations. Yellow refers to the sun and the excellence required of Air Force personnel. The fleur-de-lis represents the Squadron and alludes to the French heritage of the unit's home location. The three stars on the fleur-de-lis stand for the professionalism, dedication, and military preparedness exhibited by the personnel of the unit. The globe suggests the unit's worldwide deployment capability. The polestar symbolizes the North Star and represents the unit's wartime air traffic control and navigational aids mission.

== See also ==
- List of United States Air Force communications squadrons
