= Coonass =

Epithet used in reference to a person of Cajun ethnicity

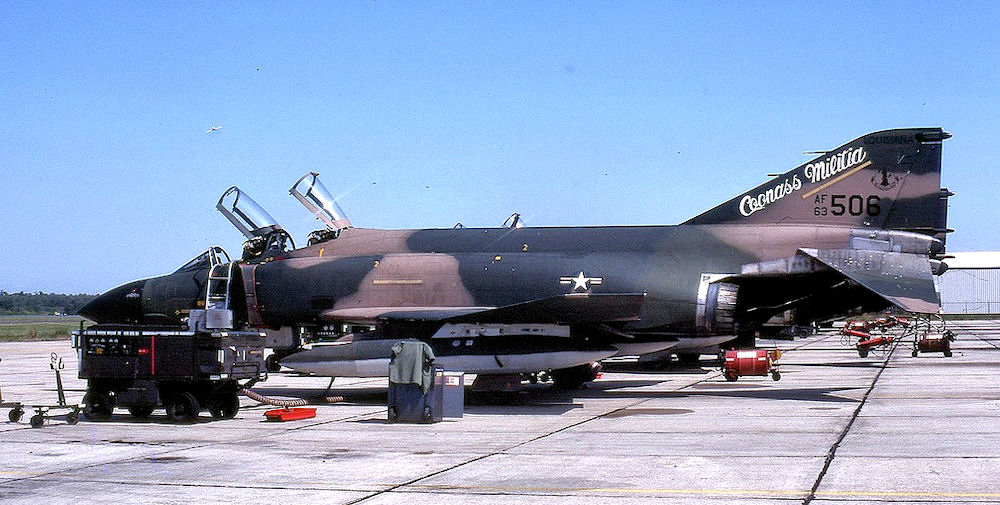
McDonnell F-4C Phantom in Vietnam War camouflage, with "Coonass Militia" painted on the tail (1981)

Coonass, or Coon-ass, is a term for a person of Cajun ethnicity. Some view it as derogatory; however, many Cajuns embrace the name.

== Usage ==
Socioeconomic factors appear to influence how Cajuns are likely to view the term, with the acceptance and use of term being an example of covert prestige: some working-class Cajuns may regard the word "coonass" as a badge of ethnic pride, whereas it may be frowned upon by some middle- and upper-class Cajuns who may be more likely to regard the term as insulting or degrading, even when used by fellow Cajuns in reference to themselves. Despite an effort by Cajun activists to stamp out the term, it can be found on T-shirts, hats, and bumper stickers throughout Acadiana, the 22-parish Cajun homeland in south Louisiana. The term is also used by some of Cajun descent in nearby East Texas, Mississippi, and Lower Arkansas.

== Etymology ==
The origins of "coonass" are obscure, and Cajuns have put forth several folk etymologies in an effort to explain the word's origin. Some of these hold that the word refers to the Cajuns' occasional habit of eating raccoons, or from the use of coonskin caps by the Cajuns' ancestors while fighting in the Battle of New Orleans or in the Revolutionary War under Spanish colonial Governor Bernardo de Gálvez. Another folk etymology attributes the term to the racial slur "coon," used in reference to African Americans. Another holds that the term derives from the shape of a woman after having children (like a raccoon viewed from above). Yet another etymology maintains that "coonass" is a corruption of the French connasseand Latin word cunnus, a vulgar term for "vulva".

The most popular folk etymology, however, stems from late Louisiana congressman and cultural activist James "Jimmy" Domengeaux, who maintained that "coonass" derived from the continental French word connasse. According to the French Wiktionary, the French Larousse dictionary, and the French Wikipedia, connasse entered the French language at the beginning of the 19th century and the term translates loosely to "dirty prostitute". Domengeaux asserted that Frenchmen used the term in reference to Cajun soldiers serving in France during World War I, and that Anglo-American soldiers overheard the term, transformed it into "coonass" and brought it back to the US as a disparaging term for Cajuns. Citing Domengeaux's etymology, Louisiana legislators passed a concurrent resolution in the 1980s condemning the word. Contrary to popular belief, the lawmakers did not ban the term. Research has since conflicted Domengeaux's proposed etymology. Indeed, photographic evidence shows that Cajuns themselves used the term prior to the time in which connasse allegedly morphed into "coonass".

== Examples ==
- In the early 1980s, a Cajun worker sued his former employer over repeated use of the word "coonass" in the workplace. The lawsuit led directly to the federal government's recognition of the Cajuns as a national ethnic group as protected by the Civil Rights Act of 1964.
- Although the Louisiana State Legislature condemned the word's use in 1981, the Louisiana Air National Guard's acclaimed 159th Tactical Fighter Group referred to itself as the "Coonass Militia" until 1992.
- University of Alabama head football coach Nick Saban came under fire in early 2007 for using the term while speaking "off the record" to a reporter.
- New Orleans pianist-singer Dr. John described himself as one in the opening lines of "Black Gold", singing "take it from this coonass". The song was one of five tracks on Dr. John's 2008 album City That Care Forgot, co-composed by Cajun songwriter Bobby Charles.
- In July 2014, Texas House of Representatives member Dennis Bonnen made a remark on the House floor referring to the language spoken by children displaced from Hurricane Katrina as "coonass". Media reports characterized his use of the term as "derogatory", "offensive", and a "vulgar slang term".
- On May 9, 2025, the conservative journalist Rod Dreher, in a post on X, used the term in reference to the newly-elected pope, Pope Leo XIV, who has some Creole ancestry. Dreher was severely criticized for using a term that many think of as a racial slur.
