= Louisiana Air National Guard =

- Shield of the Louisiana Air National Guard
- Active: 2 March 1941 - present
- Country: United States
- Allegiance: Louisiana
- Branch: Air National Guard
- Type: State militia, military reserve force
- Role: "To meet state and federal mission responsibilities."
- Part of: Louisiana National Guard; United States National Guard Bureau
- Garrison/HQ: Louisiana Air National Guard Headquarters, Naval Air Station-Joint Reserve Base (NAS-JRB), 2700 Bellechasse Street, New Orleans, Louisiana, 70119
- Nickname: Bayou Militia

Commanders
- Civilian leadership: President Donald Trump (Commander-in-Chief); Troy Meink (Secretary of the Air Force); Governor Jeff Landry (Governor of the State of Louisiana)
- State military leadership: Colonel Pat Griffin, Director of Staff, LA ANG

Insignia
- Headquarters Louisiana Air Guard emblem

Aircraft flown
- Fighter: F-15C/D Eagle

The Louisiana Air National Guard (LA ANG) (French: Garde Nationale Aérienne de Louisiane; Spanish: Guardia Nacional Aérea de Luisiana) is the aerial militia of the U.S. state of Louisiana. It is a reserve of the United States Air Force and along with the Louisiana Army National Guard, an element of the Louisiana National Guard of the larger United States National Guard Bureau.

As state militia units, the units in the Louisiana Air National Guard are not in the normal United States Air Force chain of command. They are under the jurisdiction of the governor of Louisiana through the office of the Louisiana Adjutant General unless they are federalized by order of the president of the United States. The Louisiana Air National Guard is headquartered at the Naval Air Station Joint Reserve Base New Orleans, and its commander is Colonel Pat Griffin.

Under the "Total Force" concept, Louisiana Air National Guard units are considered to be Air Reserve Components (ARC) of the United States Air Force (USAF). Louisiana ANG units are trained and equipped by the U.S. Air Force and are operationally gained by a major command of the USAF if federalized. In addition, the Louisiana Air National Guard forces are assigned to Air Expeditionary Forces and are subject to deployment tasking orders along with their active duty and Air Force Reserve counterparts in their assigned cycle deployment window.

Along with their federal reserve obligations, as state militia units the elements of the Louisiana ANG are subject to being activated by order of the governor to provide protection of life and property, and preserve peace, order and public safety. State missions include disaster relief in times of earthquakes, hurricanes, floods and forest fires, search and rescue, protection of vital public services, and support to civil defense.

== History ==
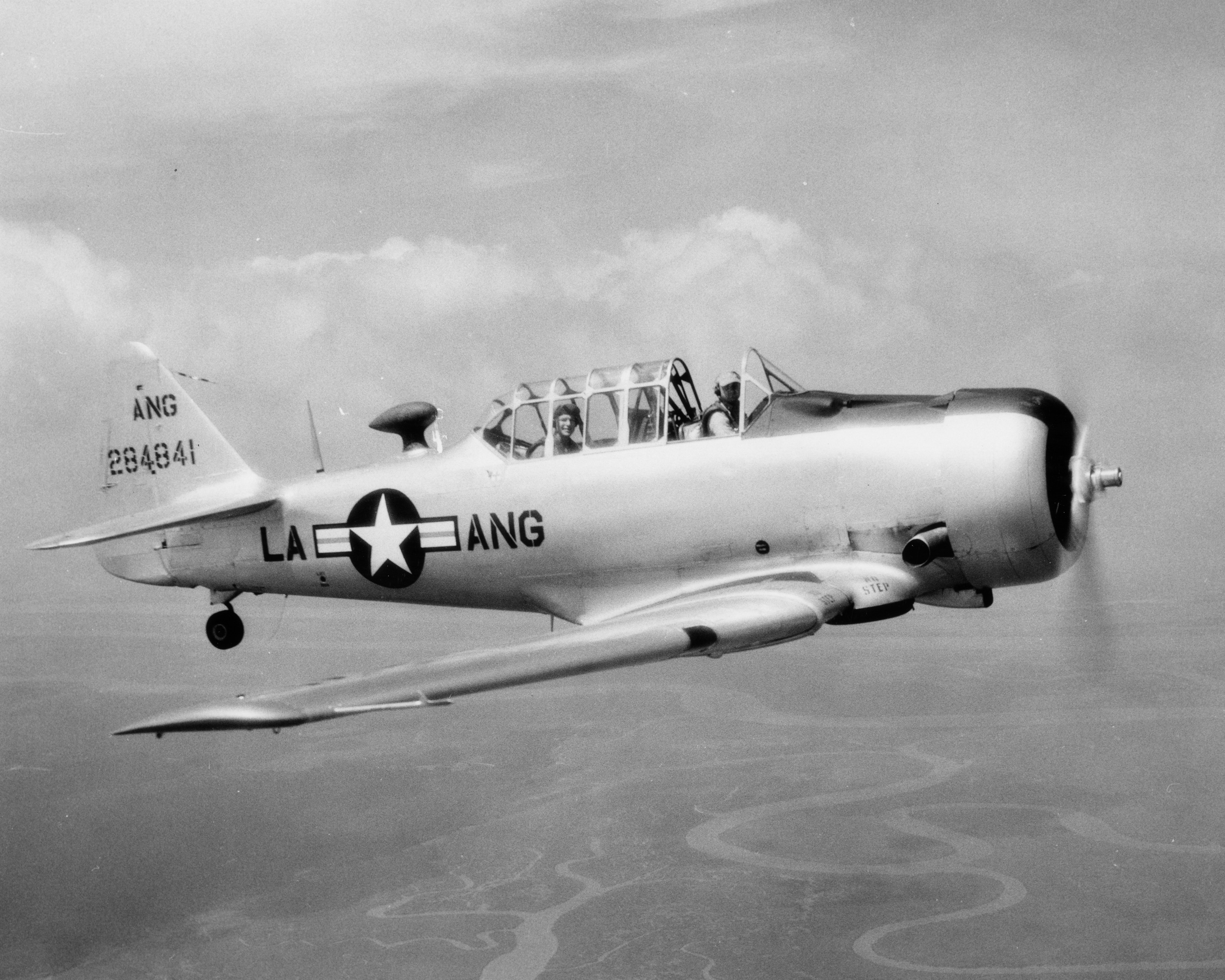
T-6 Texan from the 122nd Bomb Squadron, Louisiana Air Guard.

The Militia Act of 1903 established the present National Guard system, units raised by the states but paid for by the Federal Government, liable for immediate state service. If federalized by Presidential order, they fall under the regular military chain of command. On 1 June 1920, the Militia Bureau issued Circular No.1 on organization of National Guard air units.

The Louisiana Air National Guard origins date to 2 Mar 1941 with the establishment of the 122d Observation Squadron and is the oldest unit of the Louisiana Air National Guard. It is one of the 29 original National Guard Observation Squadrons of the United States Army National Guard formed before World War II. On 1 October 1941, the 122d Observation Squadron was activated into federal service as part of the build-up of the Army Air Forces prior to the Attack on Pearl Harbor.

On 24 May 1946, the United States Army Air Forces, in response to dramatic postwar military budget cuts imposed by President Harry S. Truman, allocated inactive unit designations to the National Guard Bureau for the formation of an Air Force National Guard. These unit designations were allotted and transferred to various State National Guard bureaus to provide them unit designations to re-establish them as Air National Guard units.

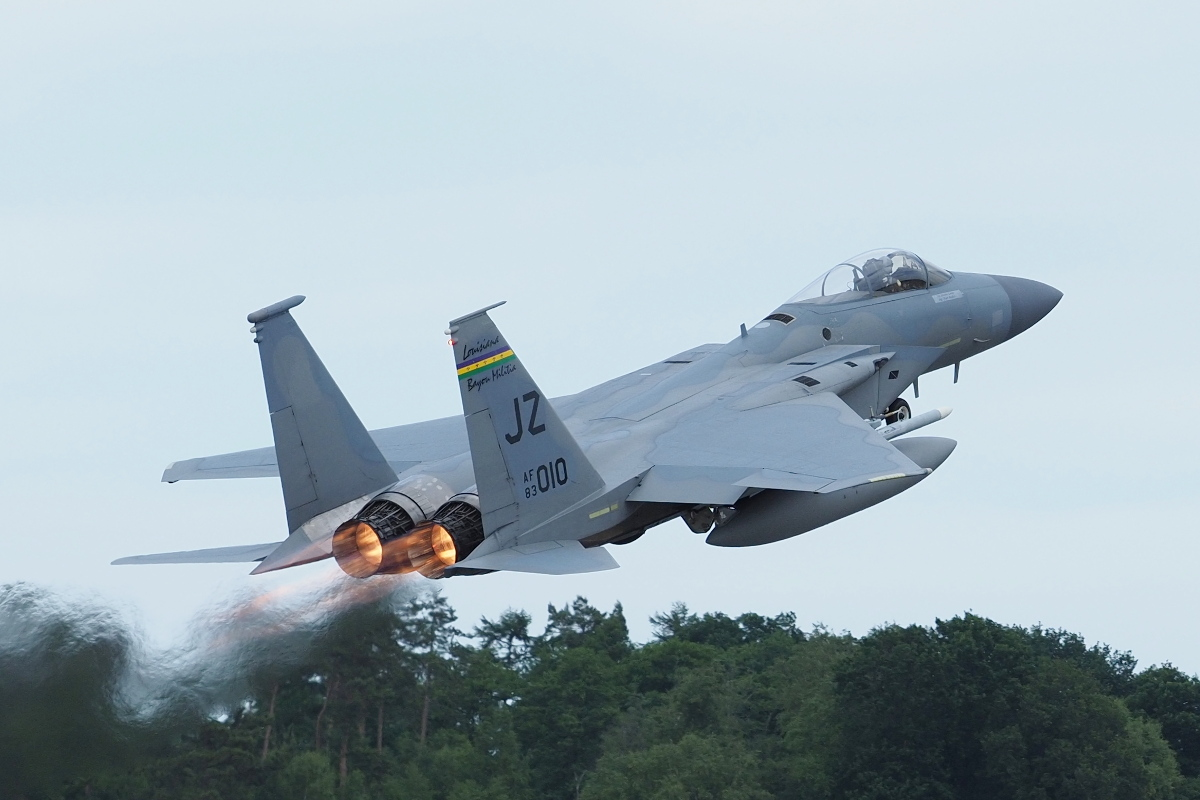
F-15C Eagle of the 122nd Fighter Squadron takes off from Hohn Air Base in 2023.

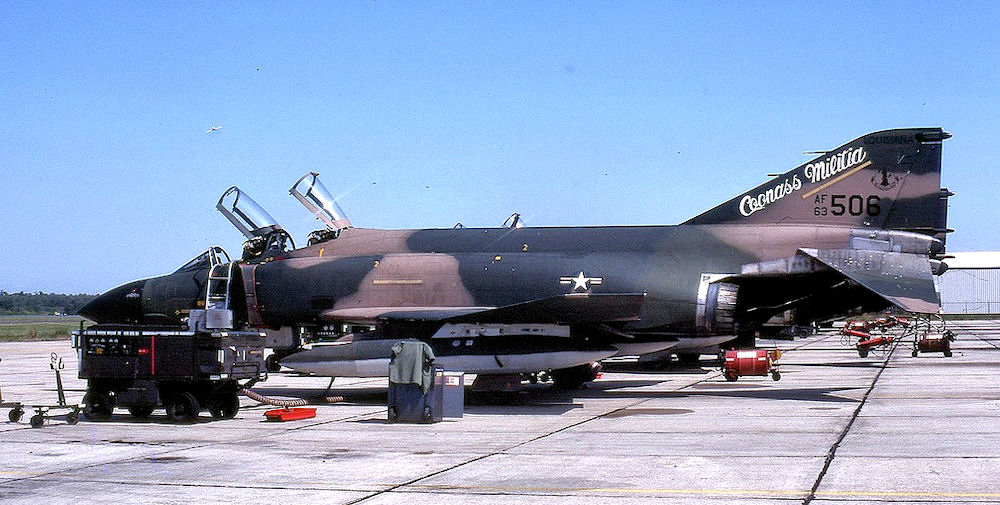
F-4C Phantom of the 122d Tactical Fighter Squadron in 1981.

The modern Louisiana ANG received federal recognition on 5 December 1946 as the 122d Bombardment Squadron (Light) at New Orleans Lakefront Airport. It was equipped with B-26 Invaders and was assigned to Tactical Air Command. 18 September 1947, however, is considered the Louisiana Air National Guard's official birth concurrent with the establishment of the United States Air Force as a separate branch of the United States military under the National Security Act.

In 1957, the B-26s were replaced with F-86L Sabre Interceptors and the mission was changed to the air defense of the state. In 1958, the 122d Fighter-Interceptor Squadron was authorized to expand to a group level, and the 159th Fighter Interceptor Group was established by the National Guard Bureau on 1 April 1958.

Since its inception, the Louisiana ANG has participated in World War II, the Korean War, the Cold War, Operation Enduring Freedom, Operation Northern Watch, Operation Southern Watch, Kosovo, Operation Noble Eagle, Air Expeditionary Force Deployments, Operation Iraqi Freedom, and the Global War on Terrorism.

== Components ==
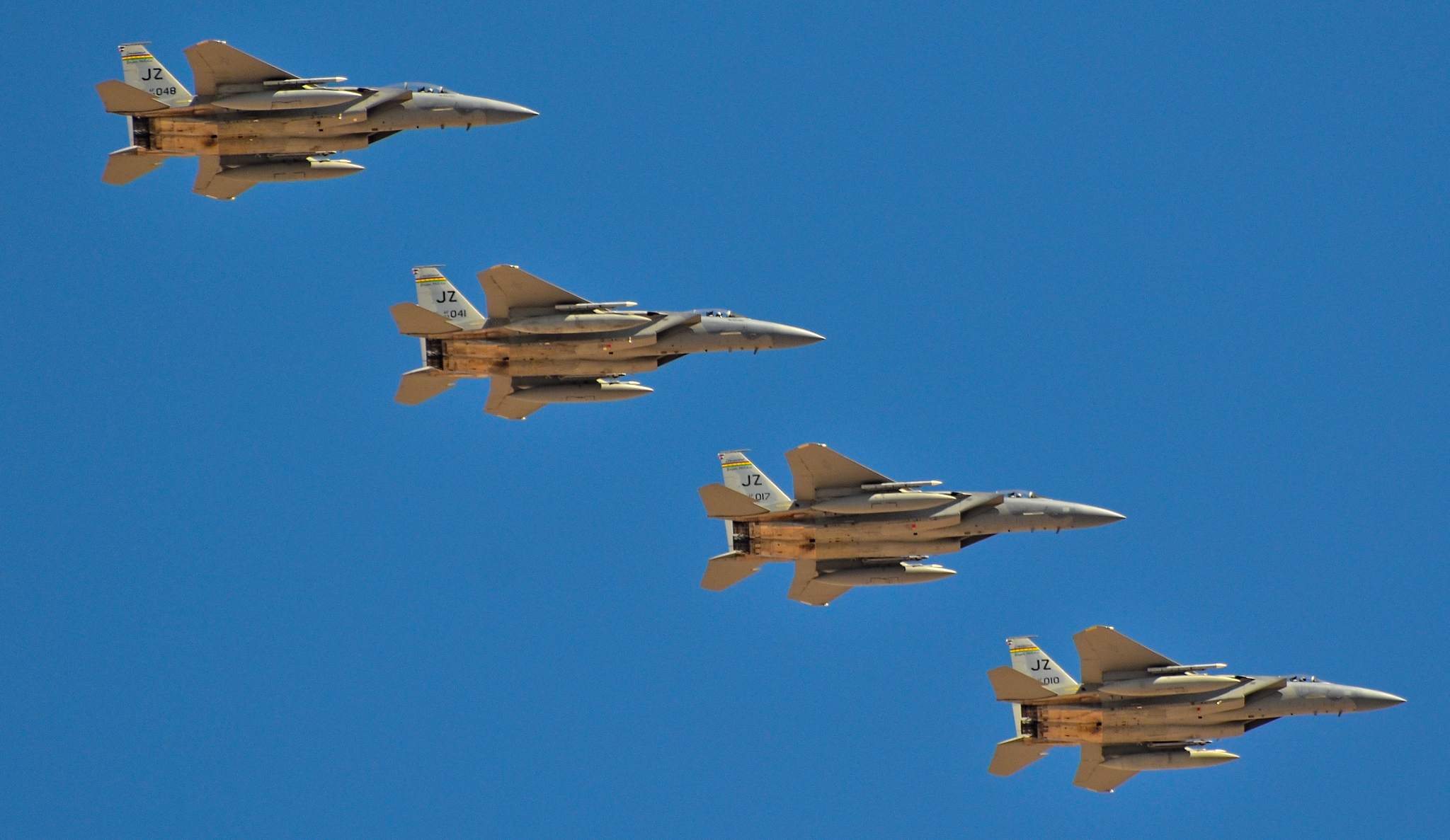
F-15C Eagles from the 159th Fighter Wing in 2015.

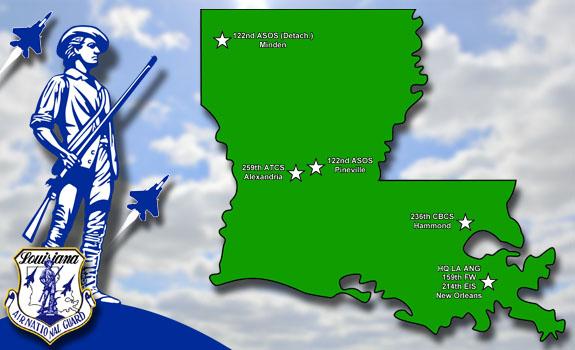
Location of Louisiana Air National Guard units

The Louisiana Air National Guard consists of the following major unit:

- 159th Fighter Wing

Established 2 March 1941 (as: 122d Observation Squadron); operates: F-15C/D Eagle
Stationed at: Naval Air Station Joint Reserve Base New Orleans
Gained by: Air Combat Command
The Louisiana ANG's flying unit, the 122nd Fighter Squadron, is nicknamed the "Bayou Militia" and operationally-gained by the Air Combat Command (ACC). Previously nicknamed the "Cajun Militia", and before that the "Coonass Militia." The title "Coonass Militia" was changed to "Cajun Militia" in 1992 because of concerns about its political incorrectness. In the late 1990s the Cajun Militia title was changed to the current "Bayou Militia."

Support Unit Functions and Capabilities:

- 214th Engineering & Installation Squadron, Naval Air Station Joint Reserve Base New Orleans
- 236th Combat Communications Squadron, Hammond Northshore Regional Airport
- 259th Air Traffic Control Squadron, Alexandria, Louisiana
- 122nd Air Support Operations Squadron, Pineville, Louisiana

== State Partnership Program ==
Louisiana has two countries in the State Partnership Program (SPP). Belize joined the SPP with Louisiana National Guard in 1996 and Haiti in 2011. Both of these nations fall under the area of operations of SOUTHCOM.

== See also ==
- Louisiana State Guard
- Louisiana Wing Civil Air Patrol
