= Hammond, Louisiana =

City in Louisiana, US

- City
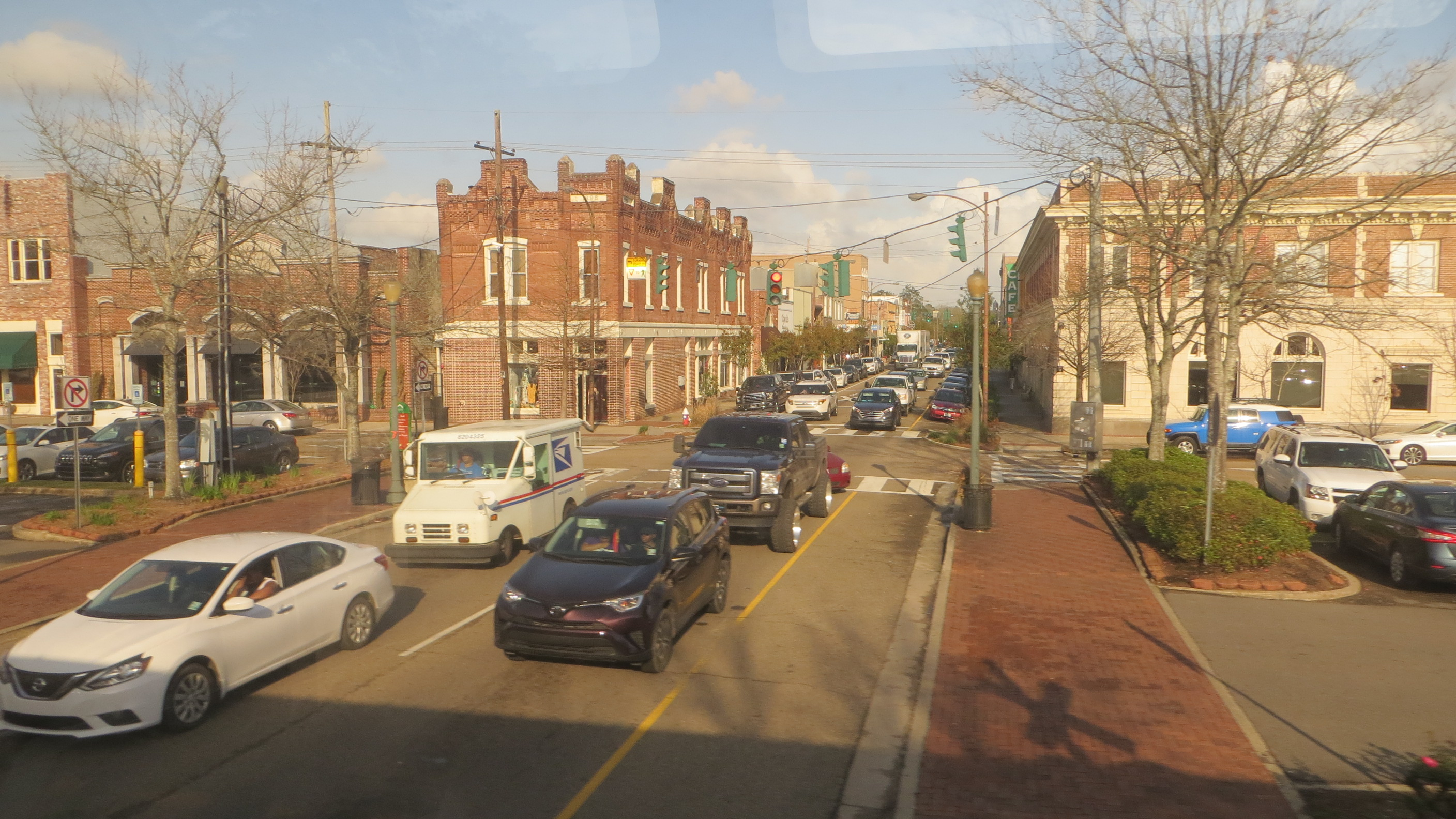
- Downtown

- Location of Hammond in Tangipahoa Parish, Louisiana

- Location in Louisiana Location in the United States
- Coordinates: 30°30′09″N 90°28′30″W
- Country: United States
- State: Louisiana
- Parish: Tangipahoa
- Settled: 1818
- Chartered: 1889

Government
  - Mayor: Pete Panepinto

Area
  - Total: 14.25 sq mi (36.92 km^{2})
  - Land: 14.25 sq mi (36.91 km^{2})
  - Water: 0.0039 sq mi (0.01 km^{2})
- Elevation: 39 ft (12 m)

Population (2020)
  - Total: 19,584
  - Density: 1,374.2/sq mi (530.59/km^{2})
- Time zone: UTC−6 (CST)
  - Summer (DST): UTC−5 (CDT)
- ZIP code: 70401, 70403
- Area code: 985
- FIPS code: 22-32755
- GNIS feature ID: 2403788
- Website: www.hammond.org

Hammond is the largest city in Tangipahoa Parish, Louisiana, United States, located 45 miles (72 km) east of Baton Rouge and 45 miles (72 km) northwest of New Orleans. Its population was 20,019 in the 2010 U.S. census, and 21,359 at the 2020 population estimates program.

Hammond is home to Southeastern Louisiana University. It is the principal city of the Hammond metropolitan statistical area, which includes all of Tangipahoa Parish and is a part of the Baton Rouge–Hammond combined statistical area.

== History ==
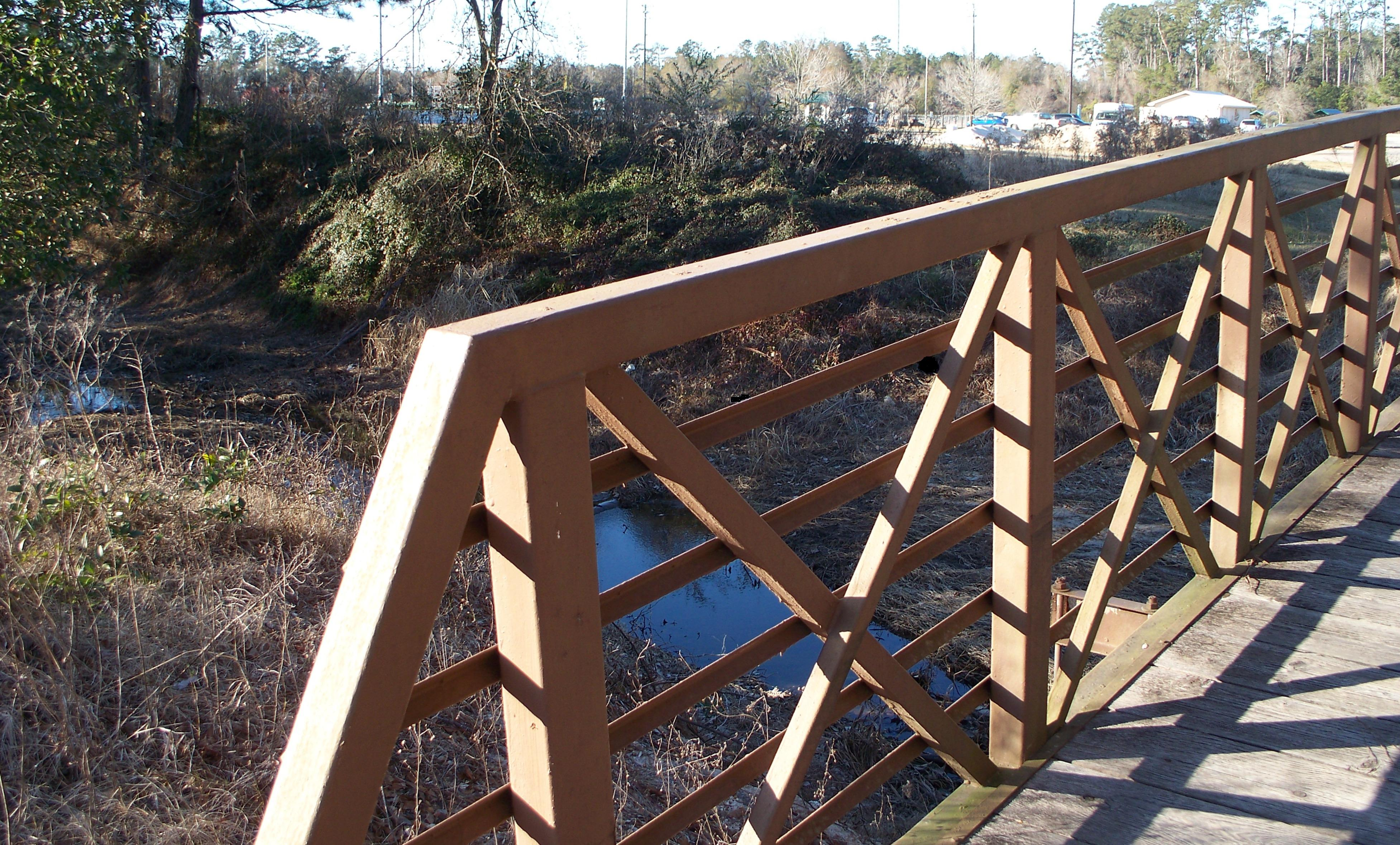
Footbridge between a student residential complex and North Oak Park

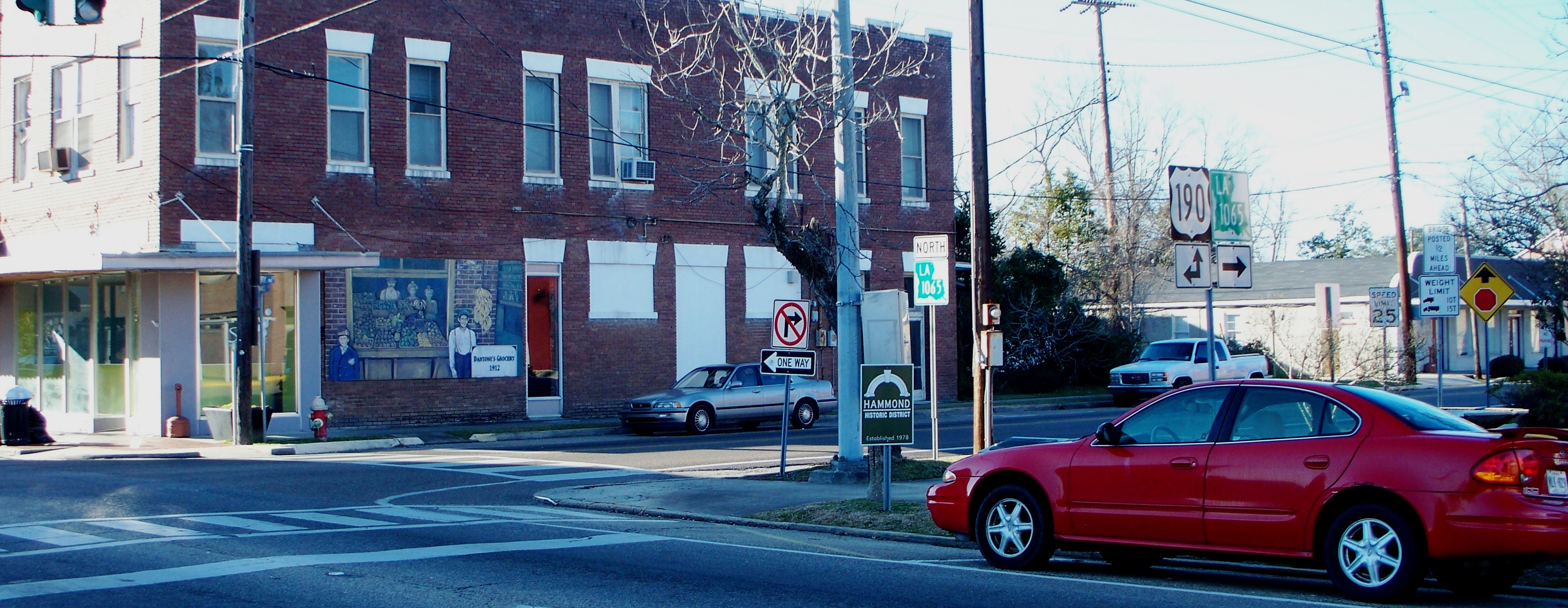
Intersection of LA 1065 (North Cherry Street) and US 190 (East Thomas Street) in Hammond's Historic District: The building in the background is Dantone's Grocery, founded in 1912 by Italian immigrants.

=== 19th century ===
The city is named for Peter Hammond (1798–1870), the surname anglicized from Peter av Hammerdal (Peter of Hammerdal) — a Swedish immigrant known as the first European settler, arriving around 1818. Peter, a sailor, had been briefly imprisoned by the British at Dartmoor Prison during the Napoleonic Wars. He escaped during a prison riot, made his way back to sea, and later reached New Orleans.

Hammond used his savings to buy then-inexpensive land northwest of Lake Pontchartrain. He developed a plantation to cultivate trees, which he made into masts, charcoal, and other products for the maritime industry in New Orleans. He transported the goods by oxcart to the head of navigation on the Natalbany River at Springfield. He held at least 30 enslaved African Americans before the Civil War. Hammond lost his wealth during the war, as Union soldiers raided his property.

In 1854, the New Orleans, Jackson and Great Northern Railroad (later the Illinois Central Railroad, now Canadian National Railway) came through the area, launching the town's emergence as a commercial and transport center. The point where the railroad met the trail to Springfield was at first known as Hammond's Crossing.

During the Civil War, the city was a shoe-making center for the Confederate States Army. Charles Emery Cate developed the shoe industry after buying land in the city in 1860 for his home, a shoe factory, a tannery, and a sawmill. Toward the end of the war, Cate laid out the town's grid, using the rail line as a guide and naming several of the streets after his sons. Also, Cate Street is named for him.

After the Civil War, light industry and commercial activities were attracted to the town. By the end of the 19th century, Hammond had become a stopping point for northern rail passengers traveling south and for New Orleanians heading north to escape seasonal summer yellow fever outbreaks. The city later became a shipping point for strawberries. A state historical plaque downtown marks it as "Strawberry Capital of America".

=== 20th and 21st centuries ===
In the 1920s, David William Thomas edited a weekly newspaper in Hammond prior to moving to Minden, the seat of Webster Parish. There, he was elected mayor in 1936.

In 1932, Hodding Carter founded the Hammond Daily Courier, which he left in 1939 to move to Greenville, Mississippi. The paper closed. Carter later received a Pulitzer Prize for his reporting on the Civil Rights Movement.

In 1944, the Tangipahoa Parish Library – Hammond branch was established.

Since 1959, The Daily Star has been Hammond's locally published daily newspaper.

During World War II, the Hammond Airport (now Hammond Northshore Regional Airport) served as a detention camp for prisoners of war from Nazi Germany.

Additionally, the U.S. Army established and used the 15,216-acre (61.58 km^{2}) Hammond Bombing and Gunnery Range east of the city. In the early 21st century, Army Corps of Engineers searched for remaining explosives in this area.

Today, Hammond is intersected by Interstates 12 and 55. Its airport has a long runway which serves as a backup landing site for Louis Armstrong New Orleans International Airport. It is also a major training site for the Louisiana Army National Guard, and the home base for the Louisiana Air National Guard's 236th Combat Communications Squadron.

About 15 mi (24 km) south of the city, on both the railroad and I–55, lies Port Manchac, which provides egress via Lake Pontchartrain to the Gulf of Mexico. The combination of highway-rail-air-sea transportation has transformed modern Hammond from a strawberry capital to a transportation capital. The city hosts numerous warehouses and is a distribution point for Walmart and other major businesses. Southeastern Louisiana University in Hammond offers the state's only academic degree in supply chain management.

In 1953, John Desmond opened the first architectural firm in Hammond. He was chief architect of the Tangipahoa Parish School Board for some two decades before he relocated to Baton Rouge.

Among the city's cultural resources is the Tangipahoa African American Heritage Museum. This is one of the destinations on the Louisiana African American Heritage Trail. Southeastern took over the Columbia Theatre in the designated Hammond Historic District to use as a downtown cultural venue. The former movie theater was constructed in 1928 and renovated by the university in the 1990s for $5.6 million.

On August 29, 2021, Hammond suffered a direct strike by the eastern eyewall of Hurricane Ida. It dropped more than 12 inches (300 mm) of rain, and caused severe flash flooding, and significant wind damage.

== Geography ==
According to the United States Census Bureau, the city has a total area of 12.8 square miles (33 km^{2}), of which 12.8 square miles (33 km^{2}) is land and 0.08% is water.

=== Climate ===
The climate in this area is characterized by hot, humid summers and generally mild to cool winters. According to the Köppen climate classification system, Hammond has a humid subtropical climate, Cfa on climate maps.

== Demographics ==
Historical population
Census	Pop.	Note	%±
1880	277		—
1890	692		149.8%
1900	1,511		118.4%
1910	2,942		94.7%
1920	3,855		31.0%
1930	6,072		57.5%
1940	6,033		−0.6%
1950	8,010		32.8%
1960	10,563		31.9%
1970	12,487		18.2%
1980	15,226		21.9%
1990	15,871		4.2%
2000	17,639		11.1%
2010	20,019		13.5%
2020	19,584		−2.2%
2025 (est.)	24,032	▲	22.7%
U.S. Decennial Census

Hammond racial composition as of 2020
Race	Number	Percentage
White (non-Hispanic)	8,584	43.83%
Black or African American (non-Hispanic)	8,865	45.27%
Native American	62	0.32%
Asian	327	1.67%
Pacific Islander	6	0.03%
Other/Mixed	693	3.54%
Hispanic or Latino	1,047	5.35%

As of the 2020 United States census, there were 19,584 people, 6,871 households, and 3,972 families residing in the city.

=== Crime ===
Hammond has suffered from exceptionally high crime rates for many years. Louisiana has been ranked the #1 most violent state in the United States.

== Arts and culture ==
The Greater St. James African Methodist Episcopal Church is listed on The National Register of Historic Places. The church was formed in 1867 by pastor Charles Daggs. Daggs was a former slave who served with the Union navy during the American Civil War. The present church building at 311 East Michigan Street was designed by architect Alexander Cornelius Evans, and completed in 1925 by builder John Noble on land purchased by Israel Carter and Albert Gibson.

Tangipahoa African American Heritage Museum is located here.

== Parks and recreation ==
The Southeastern Louisiana Lions sports teams use multiple venues in Hammond.

Chappapeela Sports Park hosts American football, baseball, basketball, lacrosse, soccer, softball and volleyball.

There are a few public parks in Hammond including Cate Square park, Zemurray Park, North Oaks Park, Mooney Avenue Park, Clarke Park, Martin Luther King Park, Jackson Park, and Hammond Dreamland Park. There is a public pool located at Zemurray Park. In addition to youth recreational sports and camps, there are adult flag football, basketball, kickball, and volleyball leagues. Other programs are available for adults including Line Dancing, Zumba, and Crafting.

== Education ==
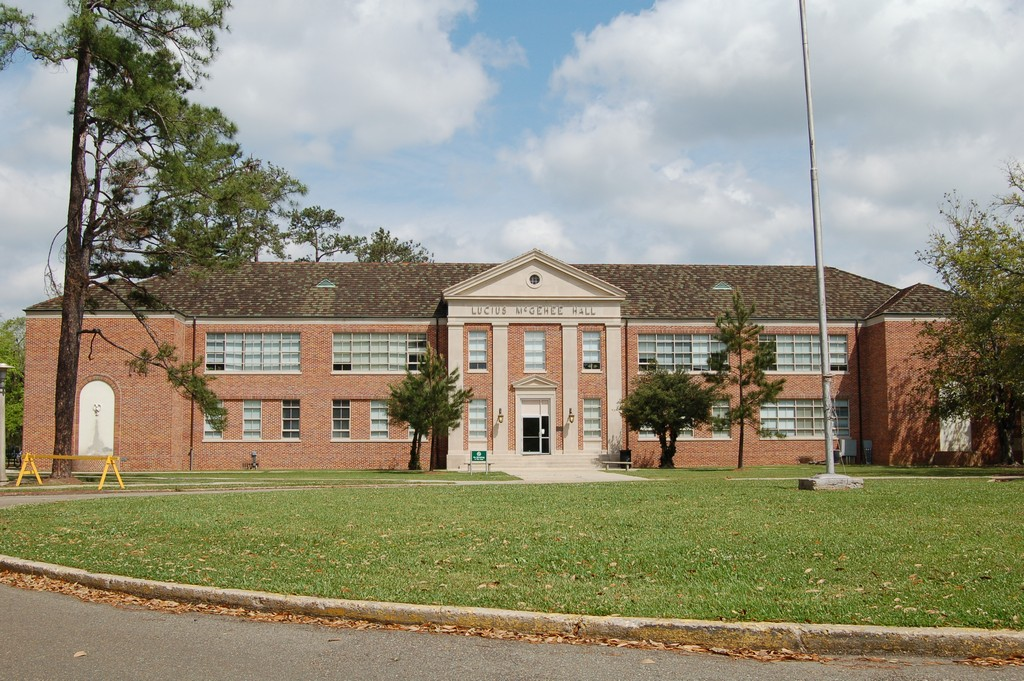
Lucius McGehee Hall on the campus of Southeastern Louisiana University listed on the National Register of Historic Places

Southeastern Louisiana University (SLU), based in Hammond, is one of the state's regional universities and one of the city's largest employers. It was established in 1925 through the efforts of the educator Linus A. Sims, then principal of Hammond High School. The city is also home to Northshore Technical Community College. There are also two vocational colleges in the city, Petra College and Compass Career College, both of which offer allied health and medical certifications.

The city's public schools are part of the Tangipahoa Parish School System and include Hammond High Magnet School, Hammond Junior High, Eastside Elementary, Westside Elementary, SLU Laboratory School, and Crystal Academy (an alternative school).

The Catholic Church operates two schools in Hammond: Holy Ghost Catholic School (pre-kindergarten through 8th grades) and Saint Thomas Aquinas High School. Trafton Academy (pre-K through 8th) and Oaks Montessori School (pre-K through 8th) are private schools.

== Media ==
- Action News 17
- Daily Star newspaper
- KSLU FM 90.9 (Southeastern Louisiana University)
- WFPR AM 1400
- WHMD FM 107.1 radio (also known as "Kajun Radio")
- WTGG FM 96.5

== Infrastructure ==
=== Law enforcement ===
Hammond is served by five police agencies:

- Hammond Police Department – the main municipal police department of the city
- Tangipahoa Parish Sheriff's Office – the parish level police agency
- Southeastern Louisiana University Police Department
- 7th Ward City Court Marshal's Office
- Louisiana State Police

=== Health care ===
North Oaks Medical Center is one of the largest hospitals in Louisiana and serve the teaching needs of Southeastern Louisiana University's College of Nursing and Health Sciences.

=== Transportation ===
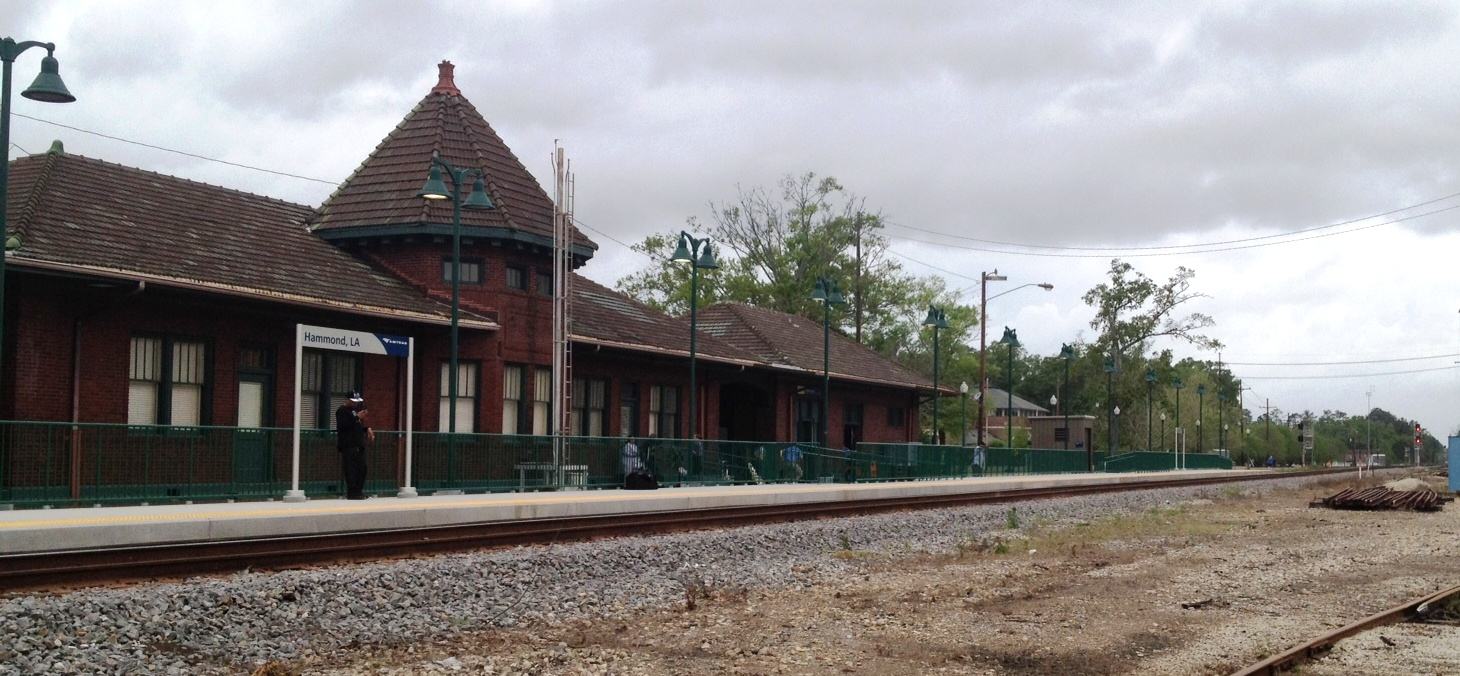
Hammond station

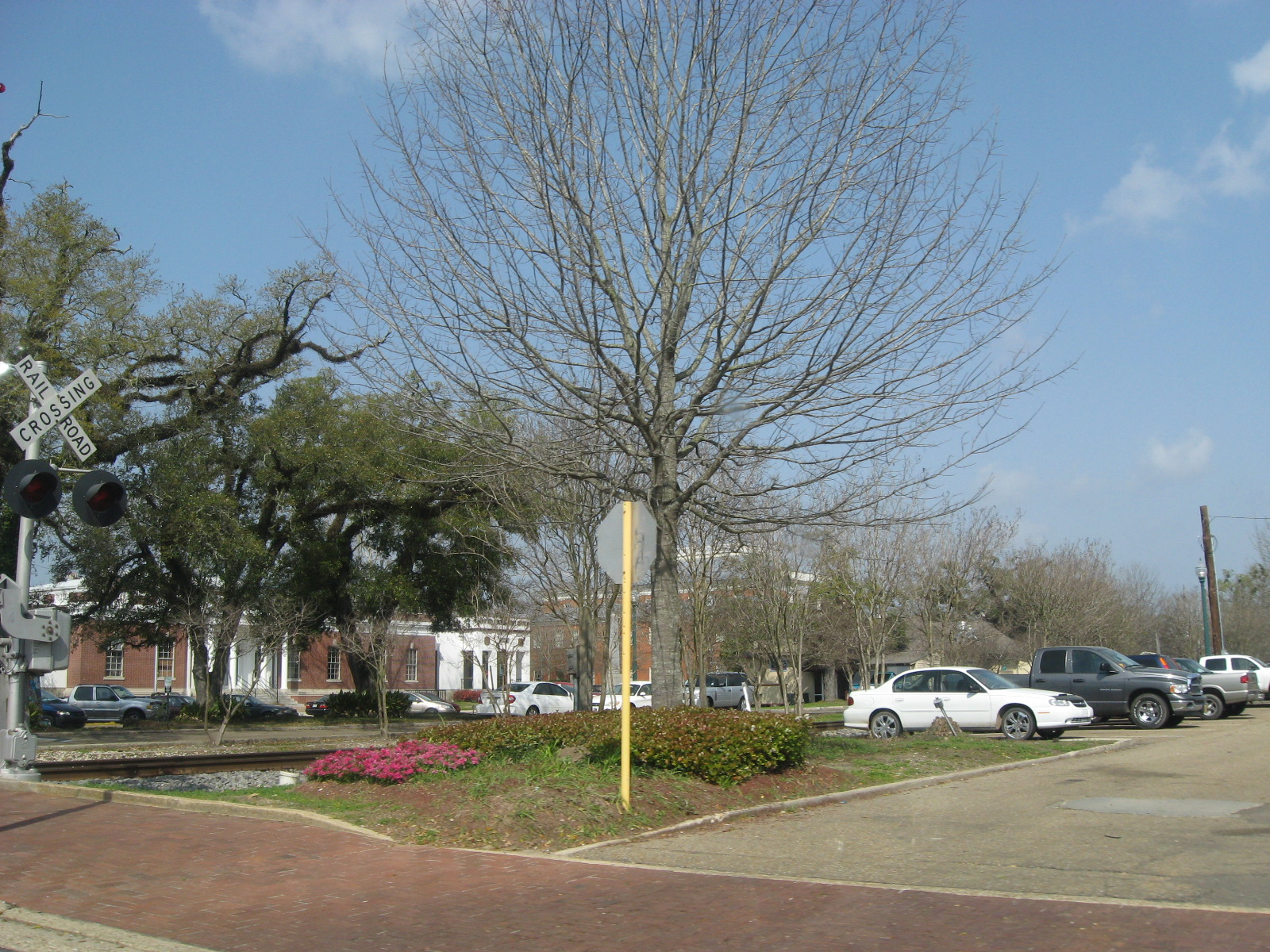
Part of the original (1854) route of the New Orleans, Jackson and Great Northern railway, still operational in the Canadian National Railway line at this railroad crossing in Hammond

==== Passenger rail ====
The southbound and northbound City of New Orleans stop daily at Hammond station.

==== Highways ====
Interstates:

- Interstate 12
- Interstate 55

U.S. highways:

- U.S. Route 51
- U.S. Route 190 (Thomas Street / Morris Avenue)

State highways:

- LA 443 (Morris Road)
- LA 1040 (Chauvin Drive and Old Baton Rouge Highway)
- LA 1064 (Natalbany Road, River Road)
- LA 1065 (North Cherry Street)
- LA 1067 (Old Covington Highway; decommissioned in 2000)
- LA 1249 (Pumpkin Center Road)
- LA 3158 (Airport Road)
- LA 3234 (University Avenue)
- LA 3260 (West Church Street Extension; decommissioned in 2018)

==== Airport ====
Hammond Northshore Regional Airport is a general aviation airport. The Louisiana Army National Guard, and 236th Combat Communications Squadron of the Louisiana Air National Guard, are stationed here. In March 2024, the NEXRAD radar from Slidell was moved to the airport and now provides coverage in between Lake Charles and Mobile with the call ID of KHDC.

== Notable people ==
- Robert Alford, cornerback for Arizona Cardinals
- Kayla Ard, Head Coach for Utah State University Women's Basketball
- George W. Bond, former president of Louisiana Tech University (1928–1936)
- George S. Bowman Jr., Major general, U.S. Marine Corps and veteran of World War II, Korea and Vietnam
- Josh Brooks, athletic director for the University of Georgia
- Alyssa Carson, space enthusiast and astronaut hopeful
- Sally Clausen, president of Southeastern Louisiana University, 1995–2001
- Michael L. Kurtz, historian.
- Wade Miley, baseball pitcher for Milwaukee Brewers
- James H. Morrison, U.S. Representative for Louisiana, 1943–1967
- Kim Mulkey, head coach for LSU Tigers women's basketball
- Jimmy Noone, musician and bandleader
- Todd O'Neill, singer
- Cindy Robbins, actress
- Robin Roberts, host of Good Morning America
- Merriell Shelton, U.S. Marine Corps Corporal featured in The Pacific
- Dr. Charles Smith, artist
- Jamie Lynn Spears, actress and country music singer
- Tyjae Spears, running back for the Tennessee Titans

== In popular culture ==
- The city was the base for production of the first season of the NBC television series In the Heat of the Night, starring Carroll O'Connor and airing in 1988. This series was adapted from the 1967 film of the same name.
- "Hammond Song", written by Maggie Roche of The Roches, documents moving to Hammond after becoming disillusioned with the music industry.
