= Naval Air Station Joint Reserve Base New Orleans =

- Alvin Callender Field
- Belle Chasse, Louisiana in the United States
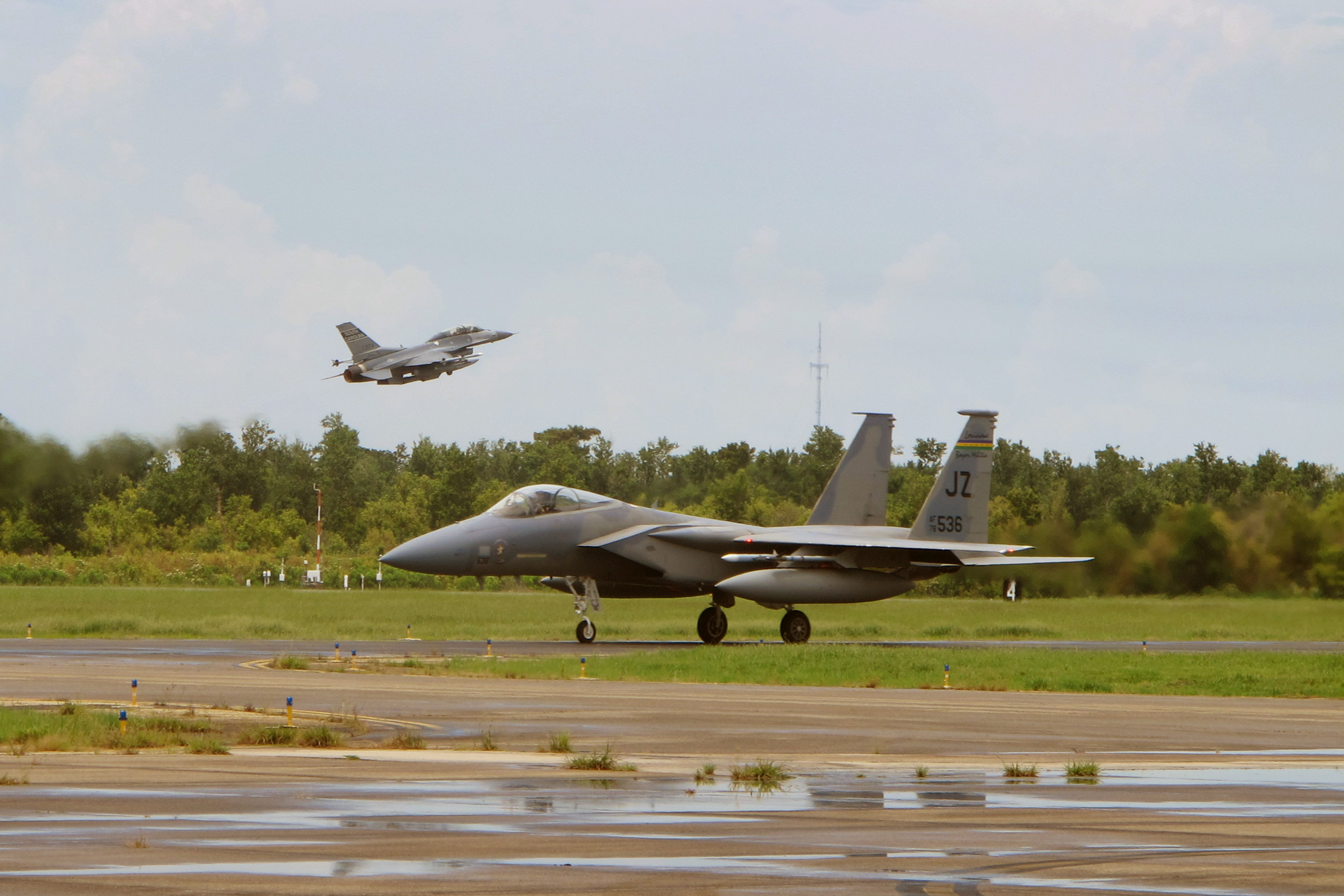
- An F-15C Eagle of the US Air Force's 159th Fighter Wing taxing at NASJRB New Orleans during 2013

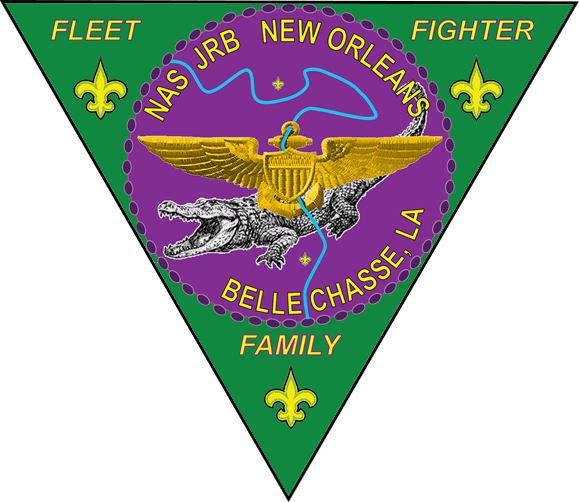

Site information
- Type: Naval Air Station Joint Reserve Base
- Owner: Department of Defense
- Operator: US Navy
- Controlled by: Navy Region Southeast
- Condition: Operational
- Website: Official website

Location
- Location within Louisiana Location within the United States Location within Gulf of Mexico
- Coordinates: 29°49′31″N 090°02′06″W

Site history
- Built: August 1954 – December 1957 (as NAS New Orleans)
- In use: 13 December 1957 – present

Garrison information
- Current commander: Captain Lena Kaman

Airfield information
- Identifiers: IATA: NBG, ICAO: KNBG, FAA LID: NBG, WMO: 722316
- Elevation: 0.64 m (2 ft 1 in) AMSL
Runways
Direction	Length and surface
04/22	3,048 m (10,000 ft) Porus European Mix
14/32	1,828.8 m (6,000 ft) Porus European Mix

Naval Air Station Joint Reserve Base New Orleans is a base of the United States military located in Belle Chasse, unincorporated Plaquemines Parish, Louisiana, United States. NAS JRB New Orleans is home to a Navy Reserve aggressor squadron and a fleet logistics support squadron, the 159th Fighter Wing (159 FW) of the Louisiana Air National Guard, Coast Guard Air Station New Orleans, a detachment of a Marine Corps Reserve light helicopter attack squadron, as well as other US Navy and US Army activities. The base has a 24/7 operating schedule to support both the 159 FW's NORAD air sovereignty/homeland defense requirements and for Coast Guard Air Station New Orleans search and rescue/maritime law enforcement/port security missions. It contains a military airport known as Alvin Callender Field (IATA: NBG, ICAO: KNBG, FAA LID: NBG) which is located about six nautical miles (12 km) south of the central business district of New Orleans. The base's predecessor, NAS New Orleans, occupied the current location of the University of New Orleans's principal campus until 1957.

== Occupants ==
=== Current occupants ===
- Fighter Squadron Composite 204 (VFC-204), U.S. Navy Reserve, operating F-5N/F Tiger II fighter-attack aircraft
- VMR Belle Chase
- 159th Fighter Wing (159 FW), Louisiana Air National Guard, operating F-15C/D Eagle fighter aircraft
- Fleet Logistics Support Squadron 54 (VR-54), U.S. Navy Reserve, operating C-130T Hercules transport aircraft
- Detachment A, Marine Light Attack Helicopter Squadron 773 (HMLA-773), U.S. Marine Corps Reserve, operating UH-1Y "Super Huey" utility helicopters & AH-1 Super Cobra attack helicopters
- Coast Guard Air Station New Orleans, operating MH-60T Jayhawk helicopters
- NCTAMS LANT Det New Orleans
- 3rd Battalion, 23rd Marines
- Navy Reserve Center New Orleans
- 377th Theater Sustainment Command
- FRC Mid-Atlantic Site New Orleans
- Region Legal Service Office Southeast Det New Orleans
- Navy Air Logistics Office
- Military Entrance Processing Station (a.k.a. MEPS), New Orleans

=== Previous occupants ===
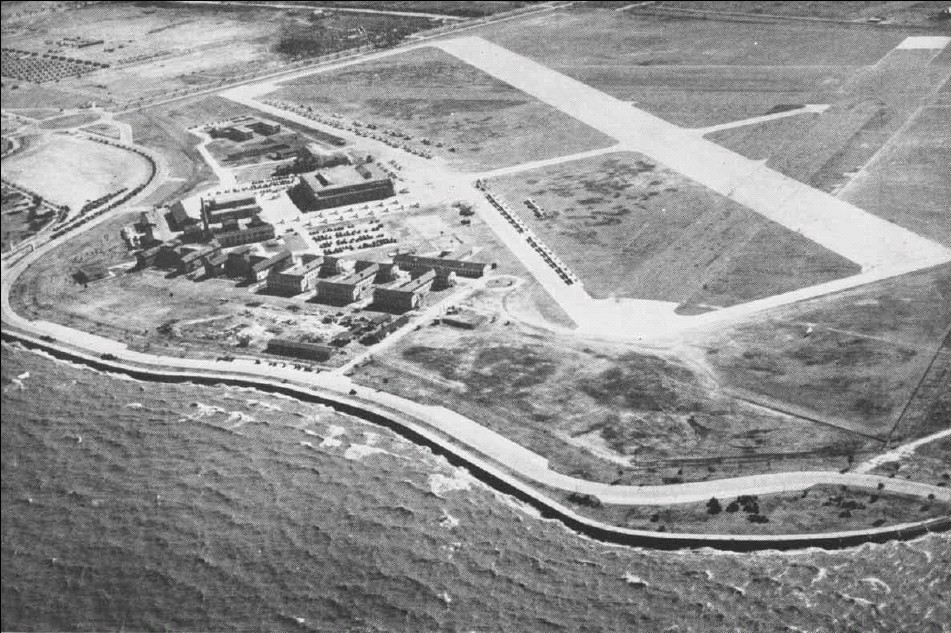
NAS New Orleans in the 1940s, located on the present-day main campus of the University of New Orleans

- VAW-77 "Nightwolves", U.S. Navy Reserve, which was the Navy's only aerial counter-narcotics unit, and flew the E-2 Hawkeye
- VP-94 "Crawfishers", U.S. Navy Reserve, an anti-submarine warfare/maritime patrol unit that flew the P-3 Orion
- VC-13, U.S. Navy Reserve, a fleet adversary unit flying the A-4 Skyhawk; relocated to NAS Miramar, CA (redesignated VFC-13 and relocated to NAS Fallon, NV) flying the F-5 Tiger II)
- Marine Aircraft Group 46 Detachment B
- Marine Aircraft Group 42
- 926th Fighter Wing (Air Force Reserve Command), which flew the A-10 Thunderbolt II; relocated to Nellis AFB, NV and re-designated as the 926th Wing, an Associate unit to the USAF Warfare Center
- U.S. Customs Service air operations
- Civil Air Patrol, SWR-LA-086

== Facilities ==
NAS JRB New Orleans (Alvin Callender Field) has two runways with PEM surfaces: 4/22 is 10,000 by 200 feet (3,048 × 61 m) and 14/32 is 6,000 by 200 feet (1,829 × 61 m).

== Demographics ==
New Orleans Station CDP
- Census-designated place
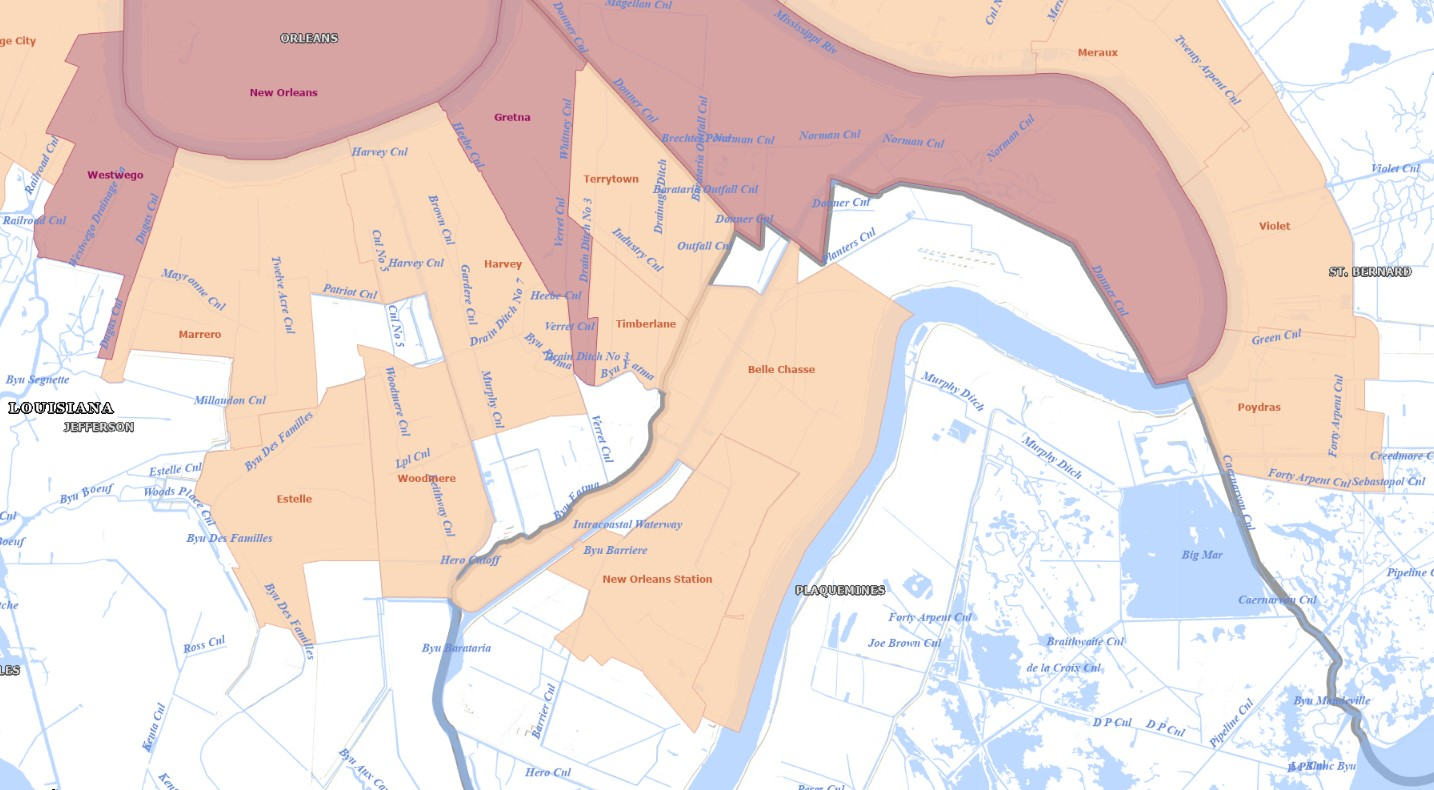
- Interactive map of New Orleans Station CDP
- Coordinates: 29°49′53″N 90°01′16″W
- Country: United States
- State: Louisiana
- Parish: Plaquemines
- Elevation: 0 ft (0 m)

Population (2020)
  - Total: 2,508
- Time zone: UTC-6 (Central (CST))
  - Summer (DST): UTC-5 (CDT)
- GNIS feature ID: 2804360

New Orleans Station is a census-designated place (CDP) covering the residential population of the Naval Air Station Joint Reserve Base New Orleans in Plaquemines Parish, Louisiana, United States. It was first listed as a census designated place in the 2020 U.S. census.

Historical population
Census	Pop.	Note	%±
2020	2,508		—
U.S. Decennial Census; 2020

New Orleans Station CDP, Louisiana – Racial and ethnic composition Note: the US Census treats Hispanic/Latino as an ethnic category. This table excludes Latinos from the racial categories and assigns them to a separate category. Hispanics/Latinos may be of any race.
Race / Ethnicity (NH = Non-Hispanic)	Pop 2020	% 2020
White alone (NH)	1,161	46.29%
Black or African American alone (NH)	587	23.41%
Native American or Alaska Native alone (NH)	19	0.76%
Asian alone (NH)	90	3.59%
Native Hawaiian or Pacific Islander alone (NH)	17	0.68%
Other Race alone (NH)	22	0.88%
Mixed race or Multiracial (NH)	159	6.34%
Hispanic or Latino (any race)	453	18.06%
Total	2,508	100.00%

It first appeared as a CDP in the 2020 census with a population of 2,508.

== Education ==
The base has a charter K-8 school, Belle Chasse Academy. The school opened on September 5, 2002.

The entire parish is in the Plaquemines Parish School Board school district. The school district schools in Belle Chasse are where the base is assigned to. Belle Chasse High School is the Belle Chasse area high school.

== See also ==
- List of United States Navy airfields
